= Yemen =

Country in West Asia

Coordinates: 15°20′54″N 44°12′23″E

Republic of Yemen ٱلْجُمْهُورِيَّةُ ٱلْيَمَنِيَّةُ (Arabic) al-Jumhūriyyah al-Yamaniyyah
- Flag Emblem
- Motto: ٱللَّهُ، ٱلْوَطَنُ، ٱلثَوْرَةُ، ٱلْوَحْدَةُ Allāh, al-Waṭan, ath-Thawrah, al-Waḥdah "God, the Homeland, Revolution, Unity"
- Anthem: الجمهورية المتحدة al-Jumhūriyyah al-Muttaḥidah "United Republic"
- Capital and largest city: Sanaa (Note: Constitutional capital. Under de facto Houthi control since 2014.)
- Government seat: Aden (Note: Claimed by the Presidential Leadership Council as its provisional capital.)
- Official language and national language: Arabic
- Ethnic groups (2000): 92.8% Arab; 3.7% Somali; 1.1% Afro-Arab; 1.0% Indo-Pakistani; 1.4% other
- Religion (2020): ~99.1% Islam (official); 65% Sunni Islam; 35% Shia Islam; ~0.9% other
- Demonyms: Yemeni; Yemenite
- Government: Unitary semi-presidential republic under a provisional government
  - President of the Presidential Leadership Council: Rashad al-Alimi (Note: Disputed by Mahdi al-Mashat of the Houthi-led Supreme Political Council. Despite not holding an official position in the government, Houthi movement leader Abdul-Malik al-Houthi controls the SPC.)
  - Prime Minister: Shaea al-Zindani (Note: Disputed by Muhammad Ahmed Miftah of the Supreme Political Council)
  - President of the House of Representatives: Sultan al-Barakani
  - Speaker of the Shura Council: Ahmed Obaid Bin Dagher
- Legislature: Parliament
  - Upper house: Shura Council
  - Lower house: House of Representatives

Establishment
  - Unification: 22 May 1990
  - Current constitution: 16 May 1991

Area
  - Total: 455,503 km^{2} (175,871 sq mi) (54th)
  - Water (%): Negligible

Population
  - 2023 estimate: ▲32,684,503 (48th)
  - Density: 71.8/km^{2} (186.0/sq mi) (143rd)
- GDP (PPP): 2025 estimate
  - Total: ▲$69.960 billion (117th)
  - Per capita: ▲$1,670 (183rd)
- GDP (nominal): 2025 estimate
  - Total: ▼$17.400 billion (135th)
  - Per capita: ▼$416 (190th)
- Gini (2014): 36.7 medium inequality
- HDI (2023): ▲0.470 low (184th)
- Currency: Yemeni rial (YER)
- Time zone: UTC+3 (AST)
- Calling code: +967
- ISO 3166 code: YE
- Internet TLD: .ye اليمن.

Yemen, (Note: /ˈjɛmən/; Arabic: ٱلْيَمَنْ, romanised: al-Yaman.) officially the Republic of Yemen, (Note: Arabic: ٱلْجُمْهُورِيَّةُ ٱلْيَمَنِيَّةُ, romanised: al-Jumhūriyya l-Yamaniyya (ALA-LC: al-Jumhūrīyah al-Yamanīyah), lit. 'the Yemeni Republic'.) is a country in West Asia. Located in southern Arabia, the country includes the Socotra Archipelago and borders Saudi Arabia to the north, Oman to the northeast, the Arabian Sea to the east, the Gulf of Aden to the south, and the Red Sea to the west. It also shares maritime borders with Djibouti, Eritrea, and Somalia across the Horn of Africa. Covering 455,503 square kilometres (175,871 sq mi), with a coastline of approximately 2,000 kilometres (1,200 mi), Yemen is the second-largest country on the Arabian Peninsula by both area and population. Sanaa is its constitutional capital and largest city. Yemen's population is estimated at 34.7 million, predominantly Muslim Arabs.

Owing to its geographic location, Yemen has been at the crossroads of many civilisations for over 7,000 years. The Sabaeans formed a thriving commercial kingdom that influenced parts of modern Ethiopia and Eritrea. In AD 275, it was succeeded by the Himyarite Kingdom, which spanned much of Yemen's present-day territory and was heavily influenced by Judaism. Christianity arrived in the fourth century, followed by the rapid spread of Islam in the seventh century. From its conversion to Islam, Yemen became a centre of Islamic learning, and Yemenite troops played a crucial role in early Islamic conquests. For centuries, Yemen was a primary producer of coffee, exported through the port of Mokha. Various dynasties emerged between the ninth and sixteenth centuries. During the 19th century, the country was divided between the Ottoman and British empires. After World War I, the Kingdom of Yemen was established, which in 1962 became the Yemen Arab Republic (North Yemen) following the North Yemen civil war. In 1967, the People's Democratic Republic of Yemen (South Yemen) gained independence from the British Aden Protectorate, becoming the first and only communist state in the Middle East. In 1990, the two Yemeni states united to form the modern Republic of Yemen, with Ali Abdullah Saleh serving as the first president until his resignation in 2012 in the wake of the Arab Spring.

Since 2011, Yemen has been enduring a political crisis, marked by street protests against poverty, unemployment, corruption, and President Saleh's plan to amend Yemen's constitution. By 2015, the country became engulfed in an ongoing civil war with multiple entities vying for governance, including the Presidential Leadership Council of the internationally recognised government and the Houthi movement's Supreme Political Council. This conflict has led to a severe humanitarian crisis.

Yemen is one of the least developed countries in the world, facing significant obstacles to sustainable development, and is one of the poorest countries in the Middle East and North Africa. In 2019, the United Nations reported that Yemen had the highest number of people in need of humanitarian aid, amounting to about 24 million individuals, or nearly 75% of its population. It is a member of the Arab League, the United Nations, the Non-Aligned Movement, and the Organisation of Islamic Cooperation.

== Etymology ==
The precise origin of the name is uncertain. The term Yamnat was first mentioned in the Old South Arabian inscriptions on the title of Shammar Yahri'sh, a king of Himyar. The term probably referred to the southwestern coastline of the Arabian Peninsula and the southern coastline between Aden and Hadhramaut.

One etymology derives Yemen from ymnt, meaning literally "the South", as Arabic derives cardinal directions based on orientation towards the east, hence the underlying linguistic root is ymn (𐩺𐩣𐩬 in the South Arabian alphabet) meaning "right". Other sources claim that Yemen is related to yamn or yumn, meaning "blessed", as the country is fertile, in contrast to the rest of Arabia.

== History ==
=== Ancient history ===
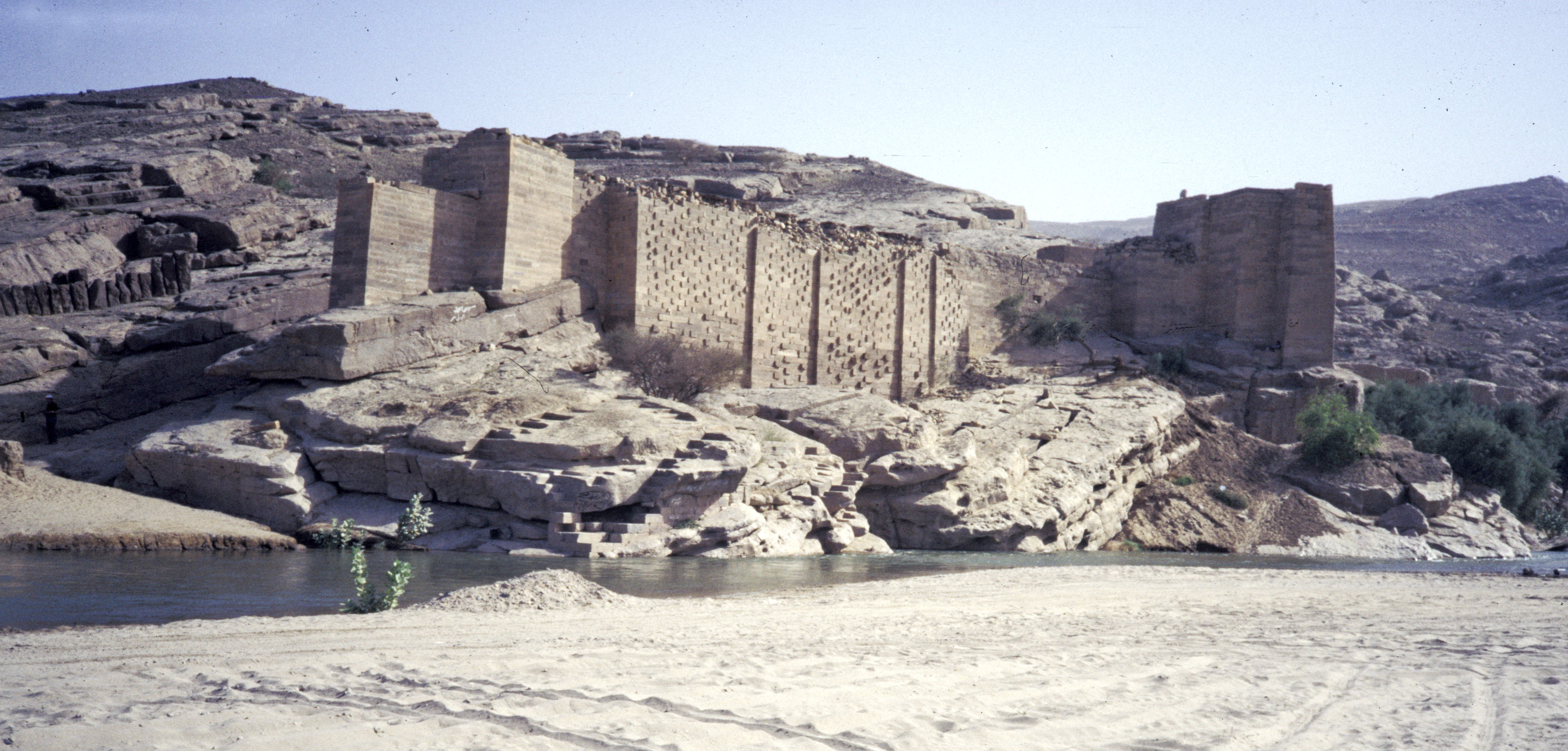
Ruins of the Great Dam of Marib

With its long sea border between eastern and western civilisations, Yemen has long existed at a crossroads of cultures with a strategic location in terms of trade on the west of the Arabian Peninsula. Large settlements existed in the mountains of northern Yemen since 5000 BC. The four major kingdoms in South Arabia were Saba, Hadhramaut, Qataban, and Ma'in.

Sabaʾ (Arabic: سَـبَـأ) is thought to be biblical Sheba and was the most prominent federation. Sabaean rulers adopted a title generally thought to mean unifier, as the role of the Mukarrib was to bring the various tribes under their kingdom. Saba built the Great Dam of Marib around 940 BC.

By the third century BC, Qataban, Hadhramaut, and Ma'in became independent from Saba. Ma'in stretched to Dedan, with their capital at Baraqish. The Sabaeans regained their hegemony in South Arabia, by establishing control over Ma'in, after the collapse of Qataban in 50 BC.

Aelius Gallus led a military campaign against the Sabaeans. A Roman army of 10,000 men was defeated before reaching Marib. The Romans took six months to reach Marib and 60 days to return to Egypt.

The country fell into chaos, with Hamdan and Himyar claiming kingship, assuming the title King of Sheba and Dhu Raydan. Dhu Raydan allied themselves with Aksum against the Sabaeans. The chief of Bakil and king of Saba and Dhu Raydan, El Sharih Yahdhib, launched successful campaigns against the Himyarites and Aksum. Sanaa came into prominence during his reign, as he built the Ghumdan Palace as his place of residence.

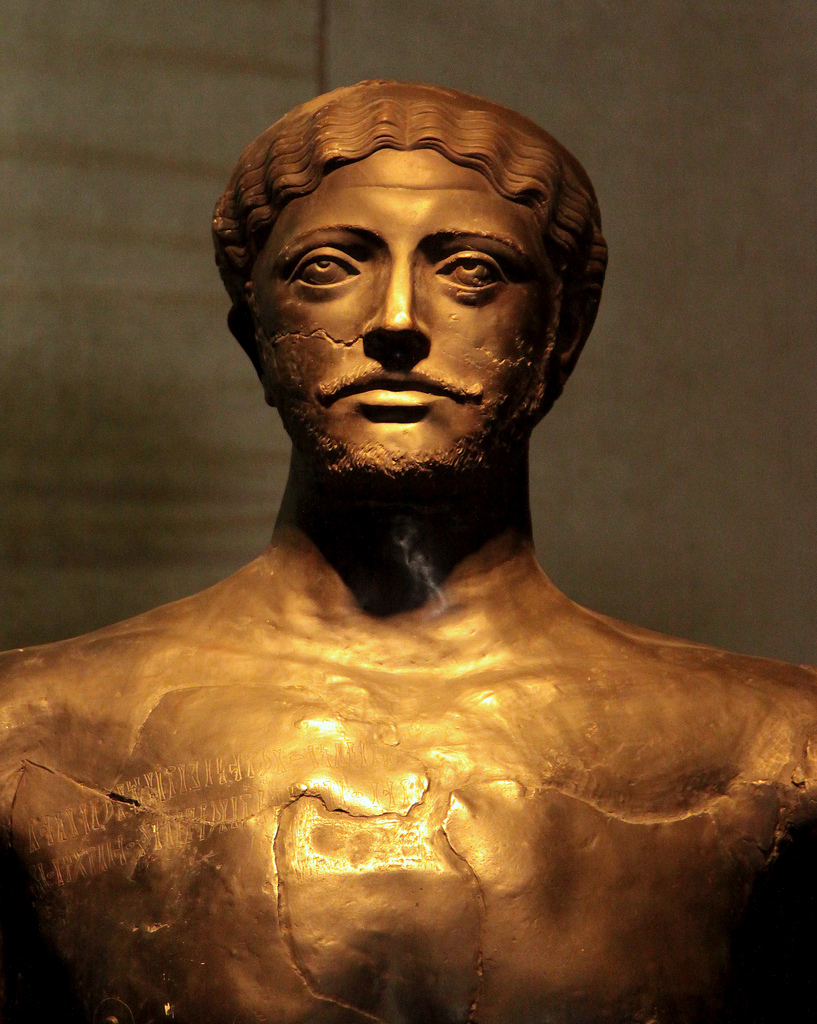
A bronze statue of Dhamar Ali Yahbur I, a Himyarite king who probably reigned in the late 3rd or early 4th century AD, displayed in the National Museum of Yemen

The Himyarites annexed Sanaa from Hamdan around 100 AD. Hashdi tribesmen rebelled and regained Sanaa around 180. Shammar Yahri'sh had conquered Hadhramaut, Najran, and Tihamah by 275, thus unifying Yemen and consolidating Himyarite rule. The Himyarites rejected polytheism and adhered to monotheistic Rahmanism.

By 515, Himyar became increasingly divided along religious lines and civil turmoil led to an Aksumite intervention. The last Himyarite king Ma'adikarib Ya'fur was supported by Aksum against his Jewish rivals. Ma'adikarib was Christian and launched a campaign against the Persia-allied Lakhmids in southern Iraq, with Arabs allied to Byzantium supporting.

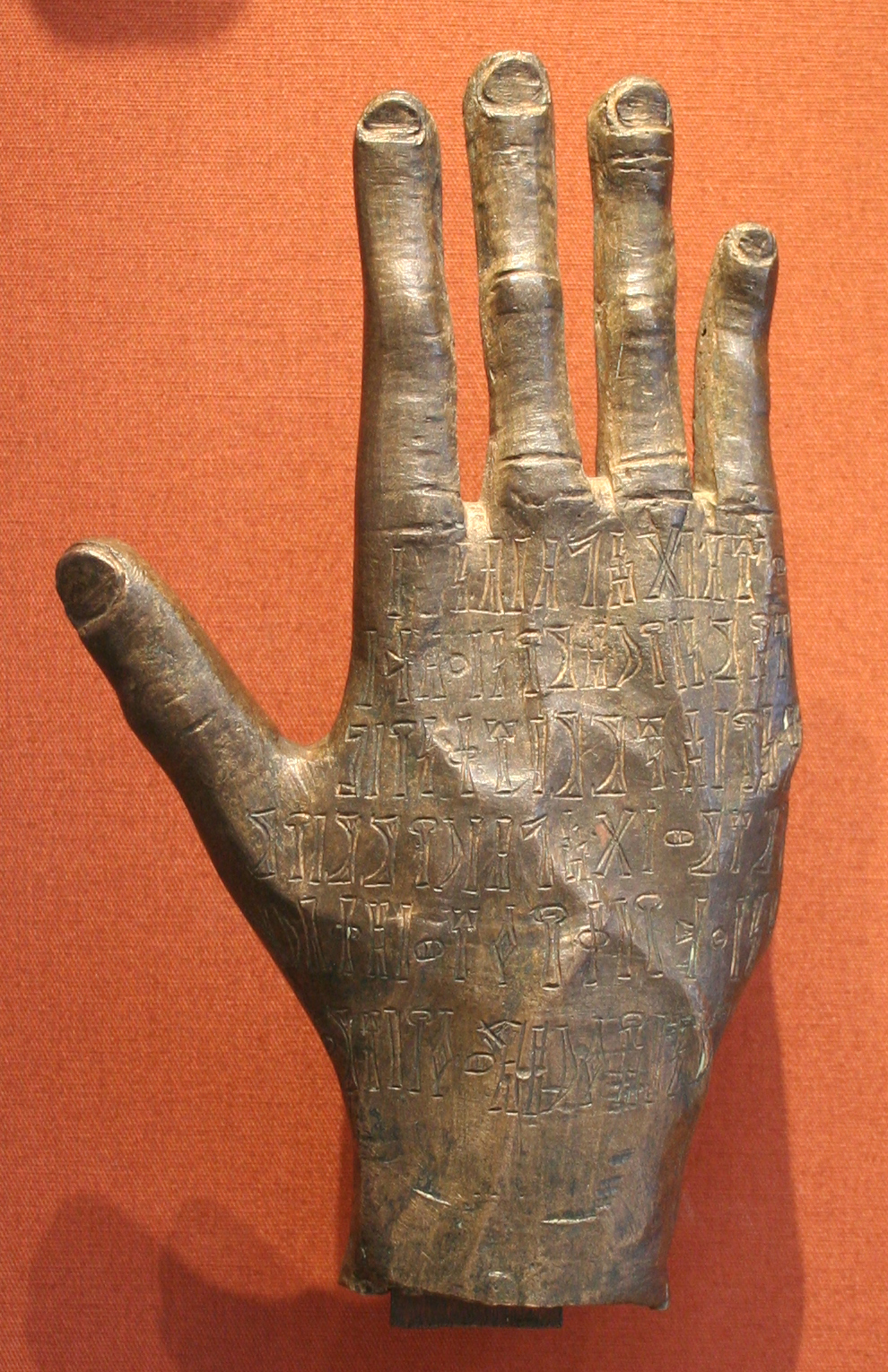
Bronze hand with an inscribed prayer in Himyaritic to god Ta'lab

After the death of Ma'adikarib Ya'fur around 521, a Himyarite Jewish warlord called Dhu Nuwas rose to power. Emperor Justinian I wanted the Himyarites to attack Persia. The Romans were successful in religiously converting and culturally influencing Aksum.

Yazid bin Kabshat, a Kendite prince, rebelled against Abraha and his Arab Christian allies. A truce was reached when the Great Dam of Marib was damaged. After Abraha died around 570, the Sassanids annexed Yemen. Under their rule, Yemen, except for Aden and Sanaa, enjoyed significant autonomy. The annexation ended ancient South Arabian civilisation, with the country being fractured between clans, until the arrival of Islam.

=== Islamic era ===
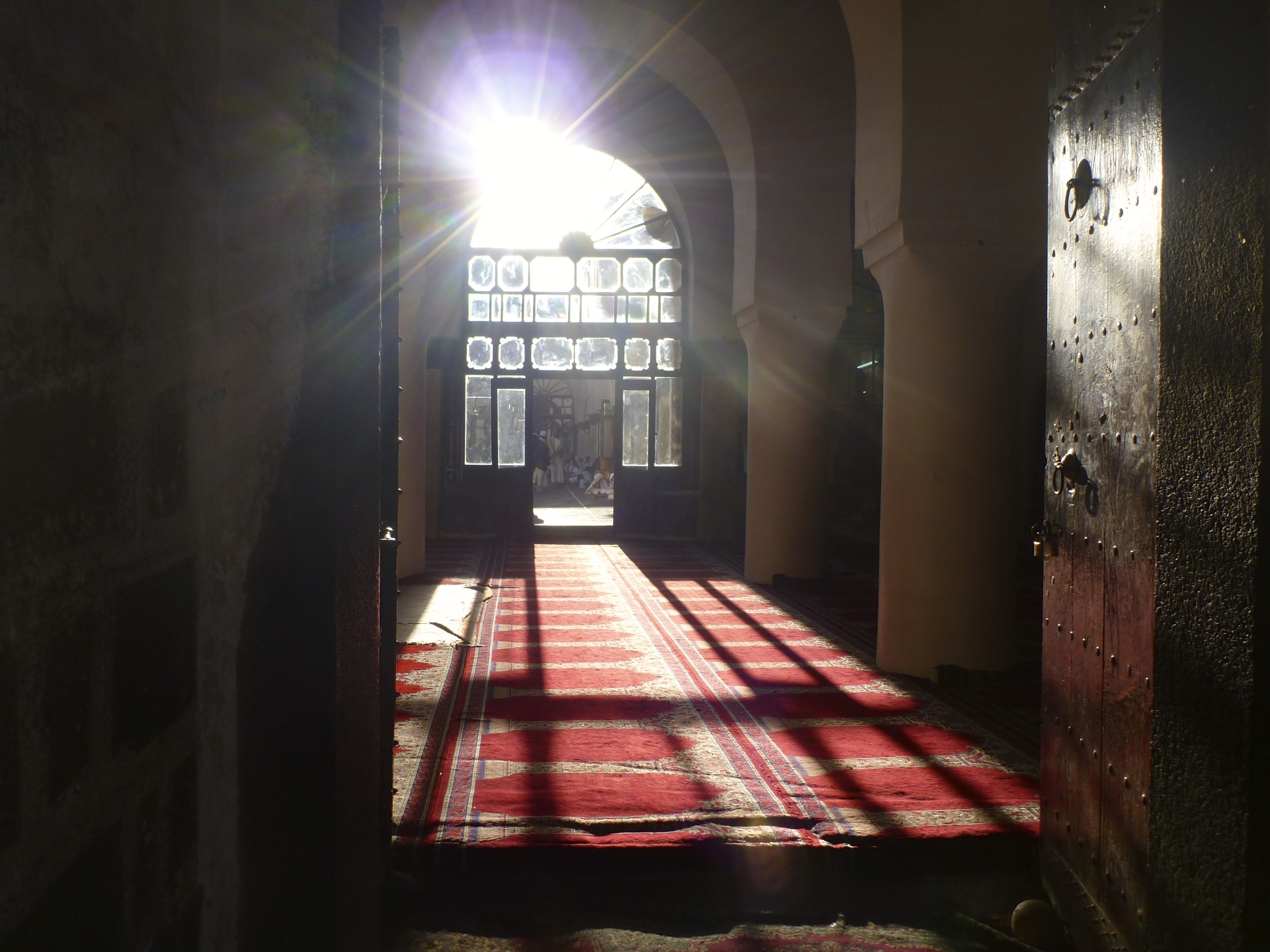
The interior of the Great Mosque of Sanaa, the oldest mosque in Yemen

Muhammad sent his cousin Ali to Sanaa and its surroundings around 630. At the time, Yemen was the most advanced region in Arabia. The Banu Hamdan confederation was among the first to accept Islam. Muhammad sent Muadh ibn Jabal to Al-Janad in present-day Taiz, and dispatched letters to various tribal leaders. Major tribes, including Himyar, sent delegations to Medina during the "year of delegations" around 630–631. Several Yemenis accepted Islam before 630, such as Ammar ibn Yasir, Al-Ala'a Al-Hadrami, Miqdad ibn Aswad, Abu Musa Ashaari, and Sharhabeel ibn Hasana. A self-proclaimed prophet of Rahman, 'Abhala ibn Ka'ab Al-Ansi, expelled the remaining Persians. He was assassinated by a Yemeni of Persian origin called Fayruz al-Daylami. Christians, who were mainly staying in Najran along with Jews, agreed to pay jizyah (Arabic: جِـزْيَـة), although some Jews converted to Islam, such as Wahb ibn Munabbih and Ka'ab al-Ahbar.

Yemen was stable during the Rashidun Caliphate. Yemeni tribes played a pivotal role in the Islamic expansion into Egypt, Iraq, Persia, the Levant, Anatolia, North Africa, Sicily, and Andalusia. Yemeni tribes who settled in Syria contributed significantly to the solidification of Umayyad rule, especially during the reign of Marwan I. Powerful Yemenite tribes such as the Kinda were on his side during the Battle of Marj Rahit.

Muhammad ibn Abdullah ibn Ziyad founded the Ziyadid dynasty in Tihamah around 818. The state stretched from Haly (in present-day Saudi Arabia) to Aden. They nominally recognised the Abbasid Caliphate but ruled independently from Zabid. By virtue of its location, they developed a special relationship with Abyssinia. The chief of the Dahlak islands exported slaves, as well as amber and leopard hides, to the ruler of Yemen. They controlled only a small portion of the coastal strip in Tihamah along the Red Sea, and never exercised control over the highlands and Hadhramaut. A Himyarite clan called the Yufirids established their rule over the highlands from Saada to Taiz, while Hadhramaut was an Ibadi stronghold and rejected all allegiance to the Abbasids in Baghdad.

The first Zaidi imam, Yahya ibn al-Husayn, arrived in Yemen in 893. He was a religious cleric and judge who was invited to come to Saada from Medina to arbitrate tribal disputes. Yahya persuaded local tribesmen to follow his teachings. The sect slowly spread across the highlands, as the tribes of Hashid and Bakil, later known as "the twin wings of the imamate", accepted his authority. He founded the Zaidi imamate in 897. Yahya established his influence in Saada and Najran. He also tried to capture Sanaa from the Yufirids in 901 but failed miserably.

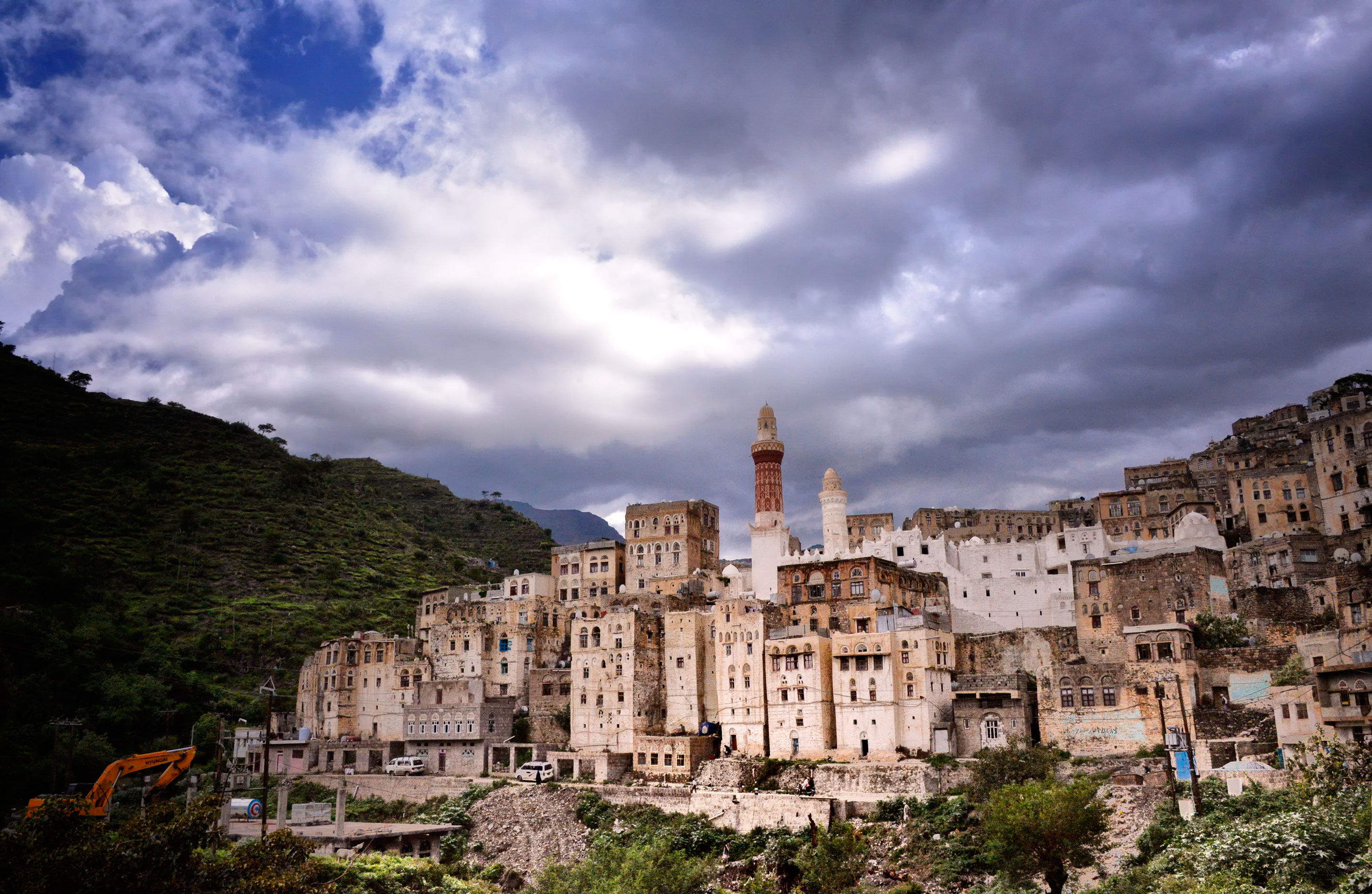
Jibla became the capital of the dynasty. Featured is the Queen Arwa Mosque.

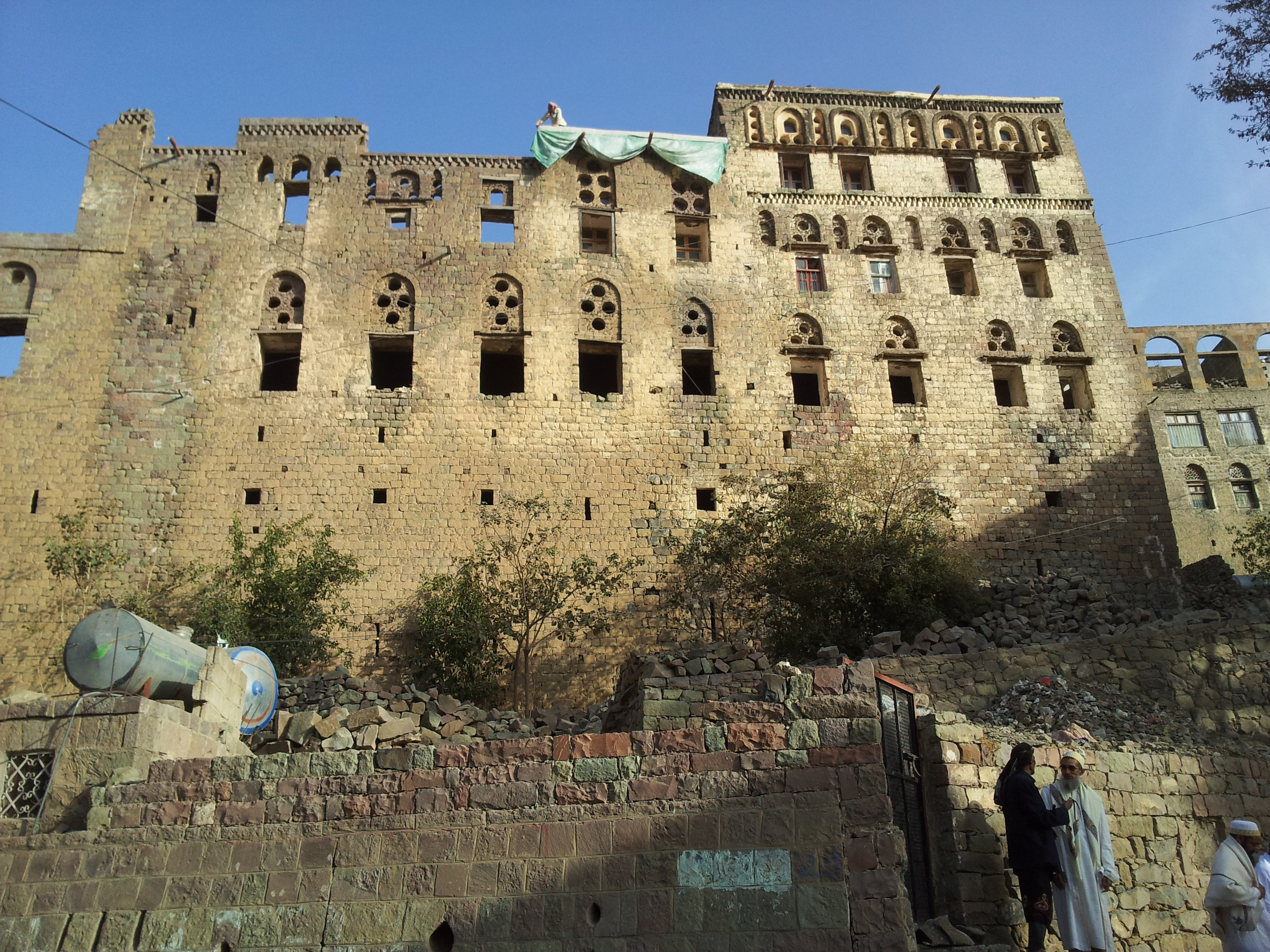
Queen Arwa al-Sulaihi Palace

The Sulayhid dynasty was founded in the northern highlands around 1040; at the time, Yemen was ruled by different local dynasties. In 1060, Ali ibn Muhammad Al-Sulayhi conquered Zabid and killed its ruler Al-Najah, founder of the Najahid dynasty. Hadhramaut fell into Sulayhid hands after their capture of Aden in 1162.

By 1063, Ali had subjugated Greater Yemen. He then marched toward the Hejaz and occupied Makkah. Ali was married to Asma bint Shihab, who governed Yemen with her husband.

Ali al-Sulayhi was killed by Najah's sons on his way to Mecca in 1084. His son Ahmed Al-Mukarram led an army to Zabid and killed 8,000 of its inhabitants. He later installed the Zurayids to govern Aden. Al-Mukarram, who had been injured, retired in 1087 and handed over power to his wife Arwa al-Sulayhi. Queen Arwa moved the seat of the Sulayhid dynasty from Sanaa to Jibla, a small town in central Yemen near Ibb. She sent Ismaili missionaries to India, where a significant Ismaili community was formed that exists to this day.

Queen Arwa continued to rule until her death in 1138. She is remembered as a great and much-loved sovereign, as attested in Yemeni historiography, literature, and popular lore, where she is referred to as Balqis al-sughra (lit. 'the junior queen of Sheba'). Shortly after Arwa's death, the country was split between five competing petty dynasties along religious lines. The Ayyubid dynasty overthrew the Fatimid Caliphate in Egypt. A few years after their rise to power, Saladin dispatched his brother Turan Shah to conquer Yemen in 1174.

Turan Shah conquered Zabid from the Mahdids in 1174, then marched toward Aden in June and captured it from the Zurayids. The Hamdanid sultans of Sanaa resisted the Ayyubid in 1175, and the Ayyubids did not manage to secure Sanaa until 1189. The Ayyubid rule was stable in southern and central Yemen, where they succeeded in eliminating the ministates of that region, while Ismaili and Zaidi tribesmen continued to hold out in several fortresses.

The Ayyubids failed to capture the Zaydi stronghold in northern Yemen. In 1191, Zaydis of Shibam Kawkaban rebelled and killed 700 Ayyubid soldiers. Imam Abdullah bin Hamza proclaimed the imamate in 1197 and fought al-Mu'izz Ismail, the Ayyubid Sultan of Yemen. Imam Abdullah was defeated at first but was able to conquer Sanaa and Dhamar in 1198, and al-Mu'izz Ismail was assassinated in 1202.

Abdullah bin Hamza carried on the struggle against the Ayyubid until his death in 1217. After his demise, the Zaidi community was split between two rival imams. The Zaydis were dispersed, and a truce was signed with the Ayyubid in 1219. The Ayyubid army was defeated in Dhamar in 1226. Ayyubid Sultan Mas'ud Yusuf left for Mecca in 1228, never to return. Other sources suggest that he was forced to leave for Egypt instead in 1223.

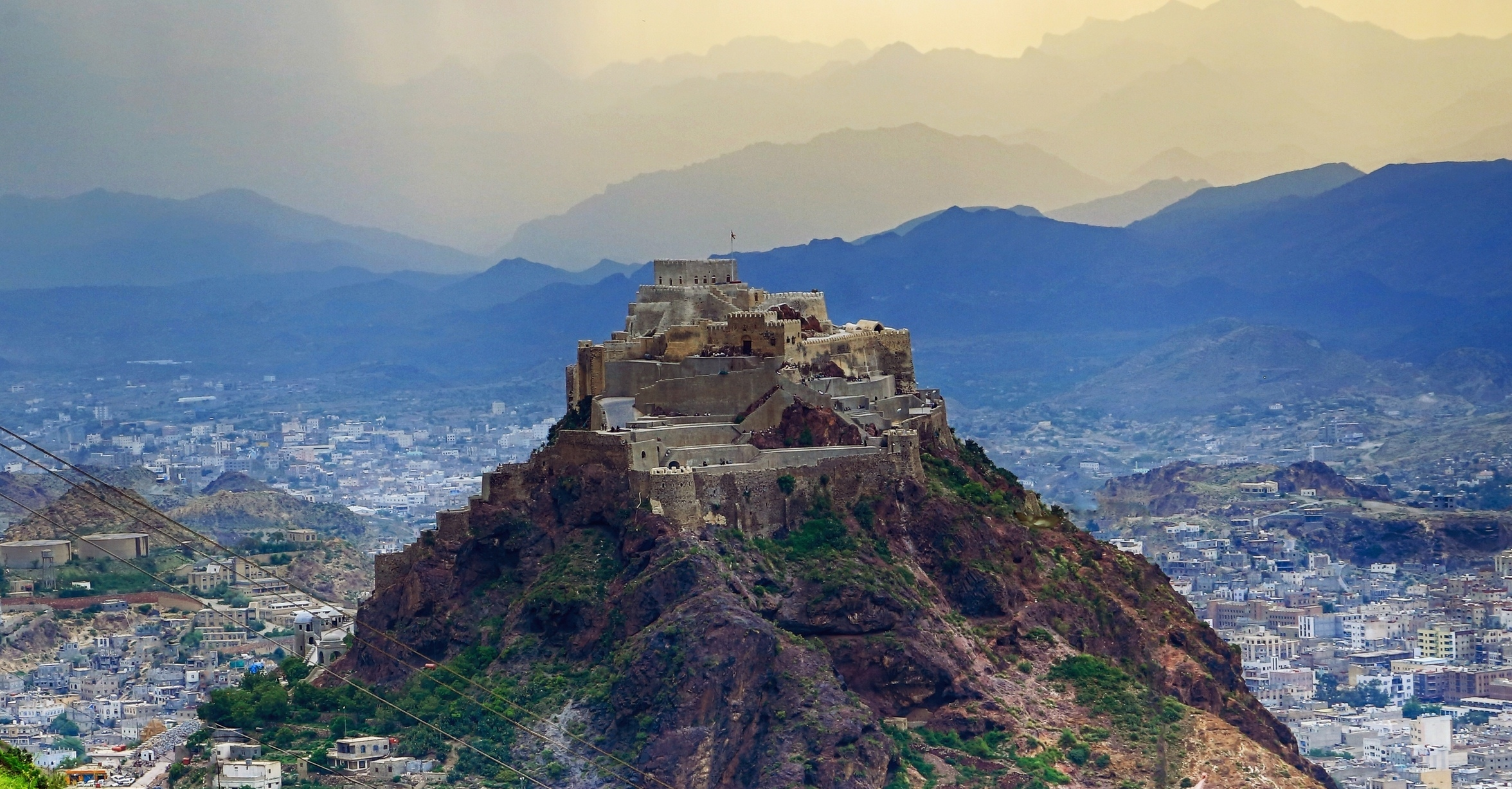
Al-Qahira Castle in Taiz built by the Sulayhids, Taiz became the capital of Yemen under the Rasulid dynasty

The Rasulid dynasty was established in 1229 by Umar ibn Ali, who was appointed deputy governor by the Ayyubids in 1223. When the last Ayyubid ruler left Yemen in 1229, Umar stayed in the country as caretaker. He subsequently declared himself an independent king by assuming the title "al-Malik Al-Mansur" (the king assisted by Allah).

Umar first established himself at Zabid, then moved into the mountainous interior, taking the important highland centre Sanaa. However, the Rasulid capitals were Zabid and Taiz. He was assassinated by his nephew in 1249. Omar's son Yusuf defeated the faction led by his father's assassins and crushed several counterattacks by the Zaydi imams who still held on in the northern highland. Mainly because of the victories he scored over his rivals, he assumed the honorific title "al-Muzaffar" (the victorious).

After the fall of Baghdad to the Mongols in 1258, al-Muzaffar Yusuf I appropriated the title of caliph. He chose the city of Taiz to become the political capital of the kingdom because of its strategic location and proximity to Aden. The Rasulid sultans built numerous Madrasas to solidify the Shafi'i school of thought, which was successful. Under their rule, Taiz and Zabid became major international centres of Islamic learning. The kings were educated men in their own right, who not only had important libraries but also wrote treatises on a wide array of subjects, ranging from astrology and medicine to agriculture and genealogy.

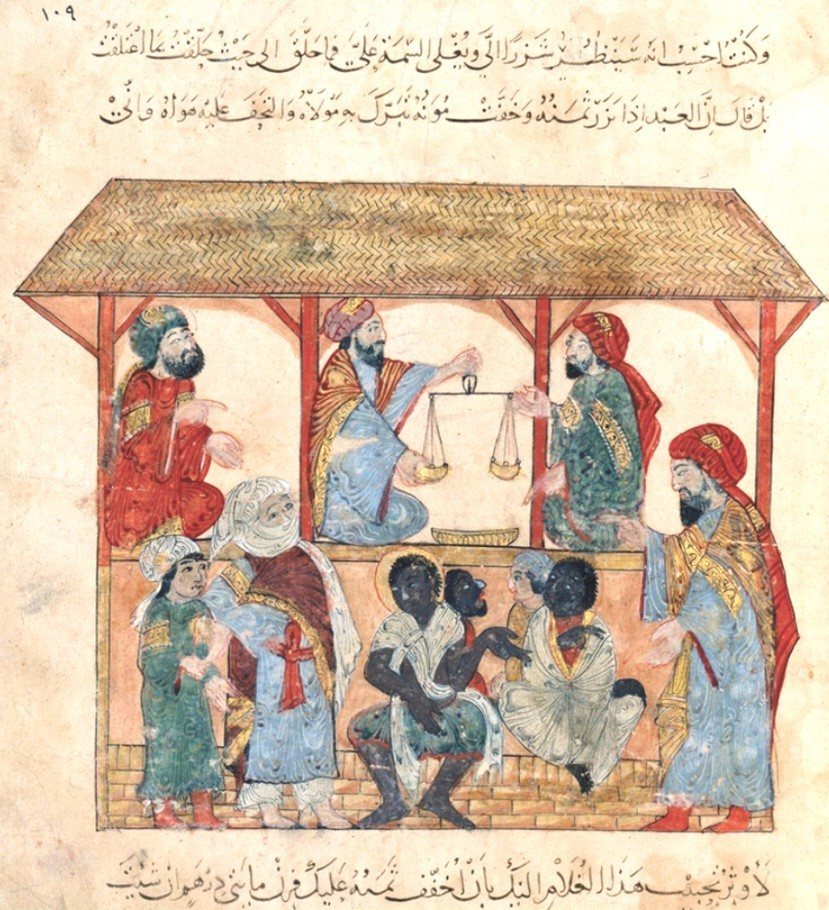
13th-century book illustration produced in Baghdad by al-Wasiti showing a slave-market in the town of Zabid, Yemen

They had a difficult relationship with the Mamluks of Egypt because the latter considered them a vassal state. Their competition centred over the Hejaz and the right to provide kiswa of the Ka'aba in Mecca. The dynasty became increasingly threatened by disgruntled family members over the problem of succession, combined with periodic tribal revolts, as they were locked in a war of attrition with the Zaydi imams in the northern highlands. During the last 12 years of Rasulid rule, the country was torn between several contenders for the kingdom. The weakening of the Rasulid provided an opportunity for the Banu Taher clan to take over and establish themselves as the new rulers of Yemen in 1454 AD.

The Tahirids were a local clan based in Rada'a. They built schools, mosques, and irrigation channels, as well as water cisterns and bridges in Zabid, Aden, Rada'a, and Juban. Their best-known monument is the Amiriya Madrasa in Rada' District, which was built in 1504. The Tahirids were too weak either to contain the Zaydi imams or to defend themselves against foreign attacks.

Realising how rich the Tahirid realm was, the Mamluks decided to conquer it. The Mamluk army, with the support of forces loyal to Zaydi Imam Al-Mutawakkil Yahya Sharaf ad-Din, conquered the entire Tahirid realm but failed to capture Aden in 1517. The Mamluk victory was short-lived. The Ottoman Empire conquered Egypt, hanging the last Mamluk Sultan in Cairo. The Ottomans had not decided to conquer Yemen until 1538. The Zaydi highland tribes emerged as national heroes by offering stiff, vigorous resistance to the Turkish occupation. The Mamluks tried to attach Yemen to Egypt and the Portuguese led by Afonso de Albuquerque, occupied the island of Socotra and made an unsuccessful attack on Aden in 1513.

=== Portuguese ===
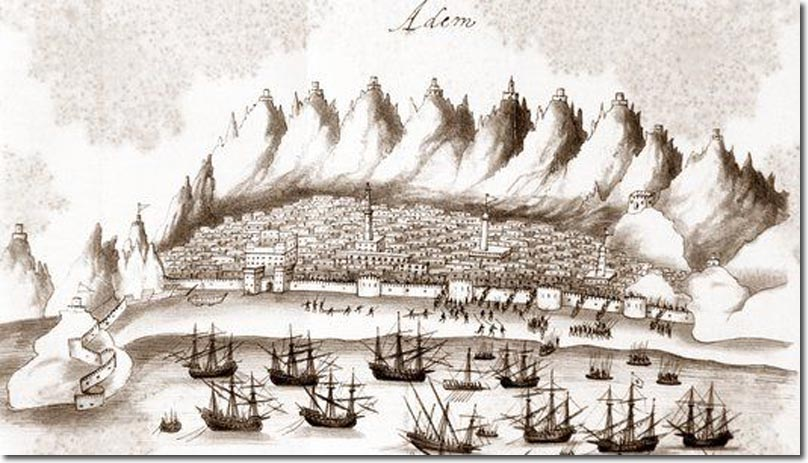
Portuguese Viceroy Afonso de Albuquerque failed twice to conquer Aden, though the Portuguese Empire managed to rule Socotra until 1511

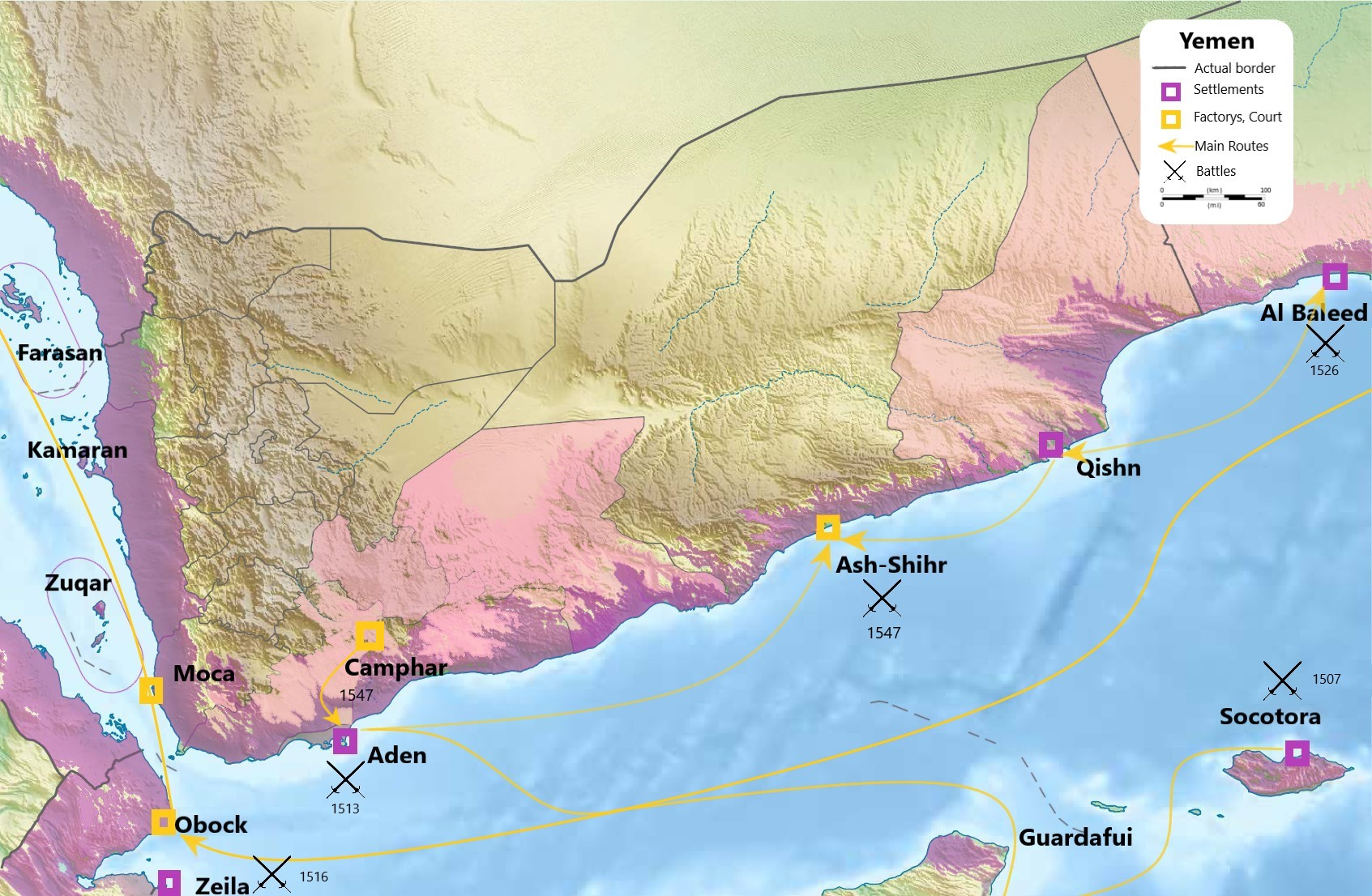
In purple, the Portuguese domains and presence in Yemen, 16th and 18th centuries. In pink, the territories of the allied and vassal sultanates (Aden, Mahra, Dhofar, and Qishn).

Starting in the 15th century, Portugal intervened, dominating the port of Aden for about 20 years and maintaining a fortified enclave on the island of Socotra during this period. From the 16th century, the Portuguese posed an immediate threat to Indian Ocean trade. The Mamluks therefore sent an army under Hussein al-Kurdi to fight the intruders The Mamluk sultan went to Zabid in 1515 and entered into diplomatic talks with the Tahiri sultan 'Amir bin Abdulwahab for money that would be needed for the jihad against the Portuguese. Instead of confronting them, the Mamluks, who were running out of food and water, landed on the coast of Yemen and began harassing the villagers of Tihamah to obtain the supplies they needed.

The interest of Portugal on the Red Sea consisted on the one hand of guaranteeing contacts with a Christian ally in Ethiopia and on the other of being able to attack Mecca and the Arab territories from the rear, while still having absolute dominance over trade of spices. The main intention was to dominate the commerce of the cities on the coast of Africa and Arabia. To this end, Portugal sought to influence and dominate by force or persuasion all the ports and kingdoms that fought among themselves. It was common for Portugal to keep under its influence the Arab allies that were interested in maintaining independence from other Arab states in the region.

=== Modern era ===
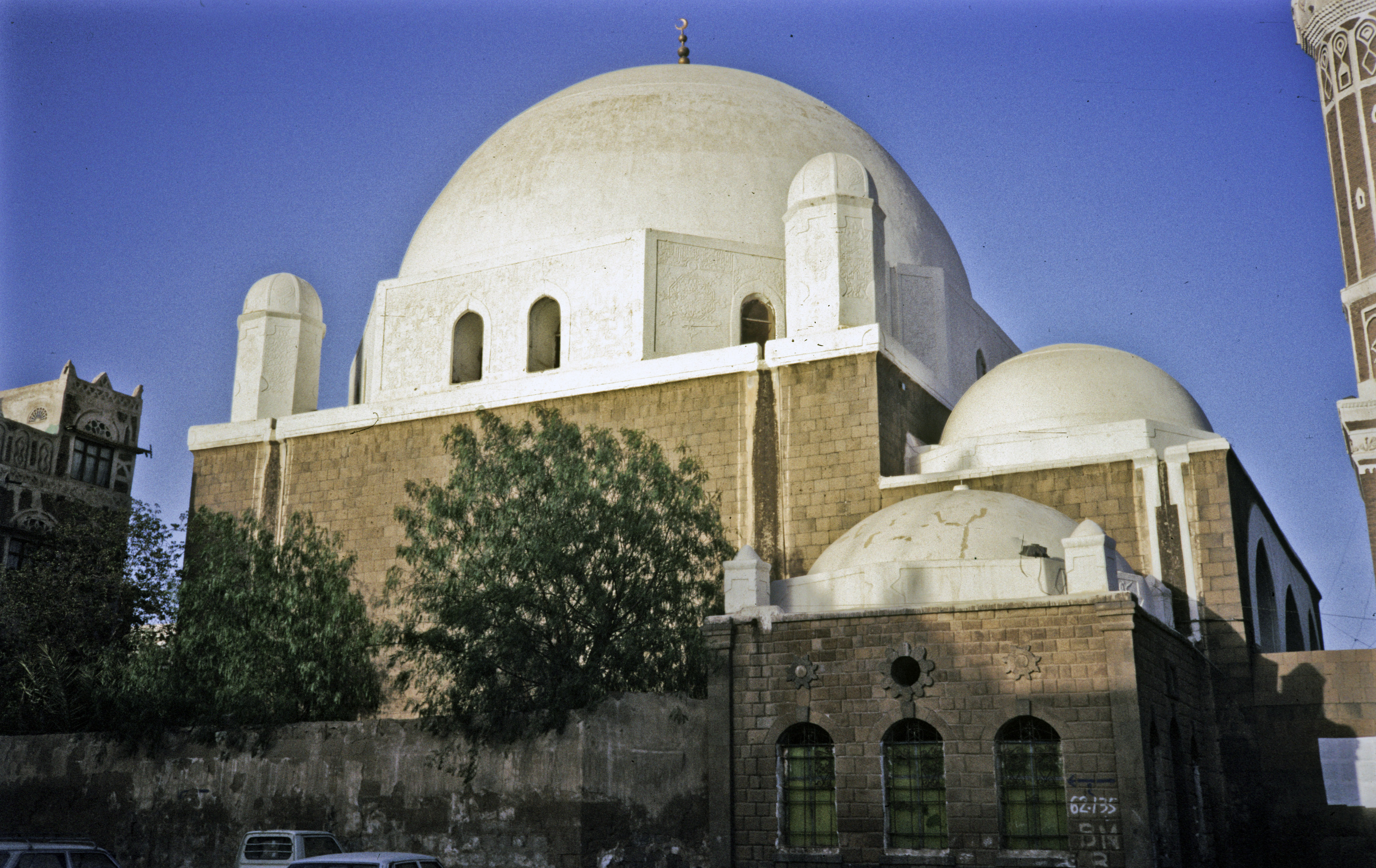
Al Bakiriyya Ottoman Mosque in Sanaa was built in 1597.

The Ottomans had two fundamental interests to safeguard in Yemen—the Islamic holy cities of Mecca and Medina, and the trade route with India for spices and textiles, both threatened, and the latter virtually eclipsed, by the arrival of the Portuguese in the Indian Ocean and the Red Sea in the early 16th century. Hadım Suleiman Pasha, the Ottoman governor of Egypt, stormed Aden in 1538, and extended Ottoman authority to include Zabid in 1539, making it the administrative headquarters of Yemen Eyalet, and eventually taking Tihamah in its entirety. The Ottoman governors did not exercise much control over the highlands. They held sway mainly in the southern coastal region, particularly around Zabid, Mokha, and Aden.

In 1632, Al-Mu'ayyad Muhammad sent an expeditionary force of 1,000 men to conquer Mecca. The army entered the city in triumph and killed its governor. The Ottomans sent an army from Egypt to fight the Yemenites. Seeing that the Turkish army was too numerous to overcome, the Yemeni army retreated to a valley outside Mecca. Ottoman troops attacked the Yemenis by hiding at the wells that supplied them with water. This plan proceeded successfully, causing the Yemenis over 200 casualties, most from thirst. The tribesmen eventually surrendered and returned to Yemen. Al-Mu'ayyad Muhammad died in 1644. He was succeeded by Al-Mutawakkil Isma'il, another son of al-Mansur al-Qasim, who conquered Yemen in its entirety.

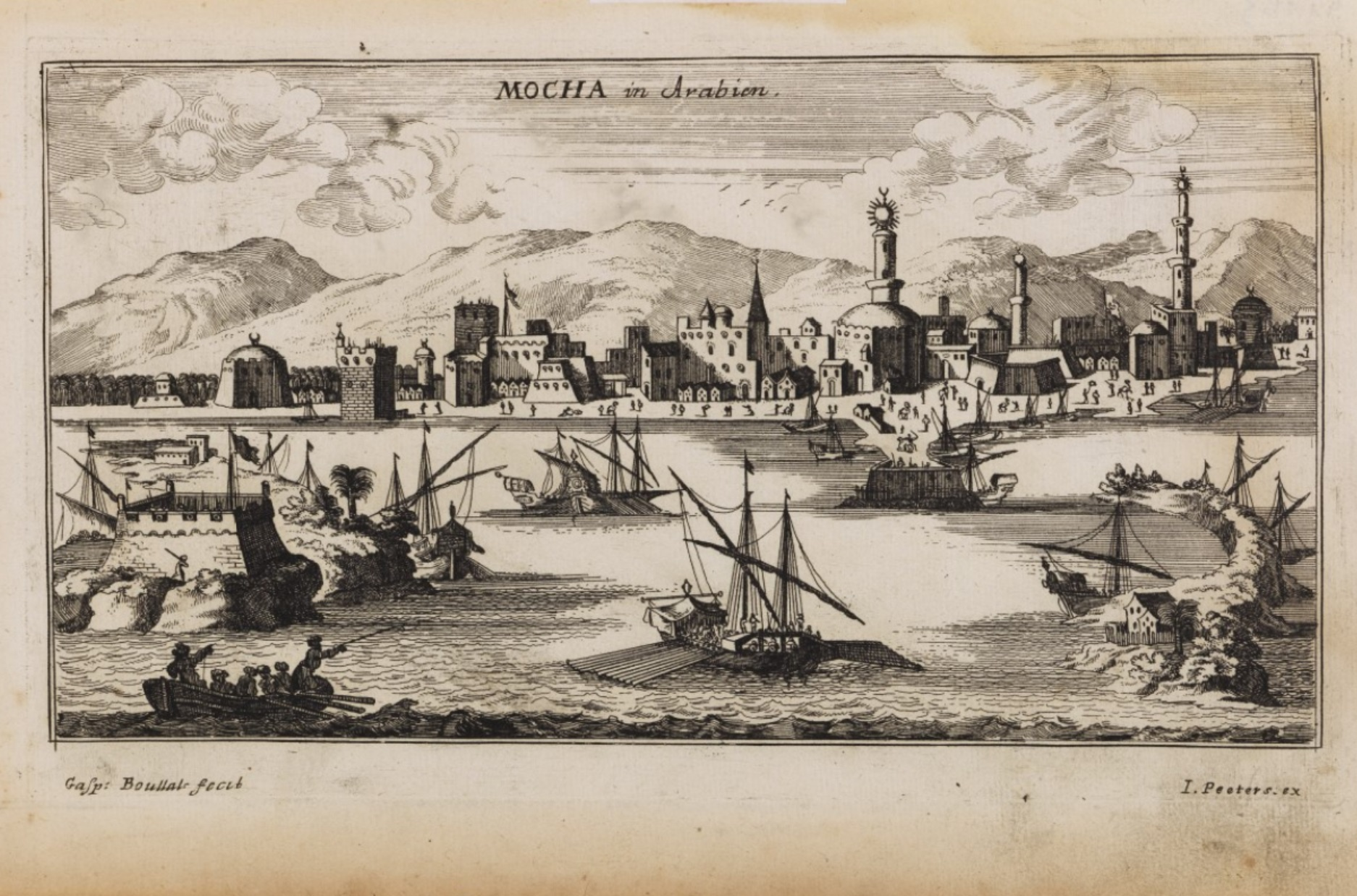
Mokha was Yemen's busiest port in the 17th and 18th centuries.

Yemen became the sole coffee producer in the world. The country established diplomatic relations with the Safavid dynasty of Persia, Ottomans of Hejaz, Mughal Empire in India, and Ethiopia, as well. In the first half of the 18th century, the Europeans broke Yemen's monopoly on coffee by smuggling coffee trees and cultivating them in their own colonies in the East Indies, East Africa, the West Indies, and Latin America. The imamate did not follow a cohesive mechanism for succession, and family quarrels and tribal insubordination led to the political decline of the Qasimi dynasty in the 18th century.

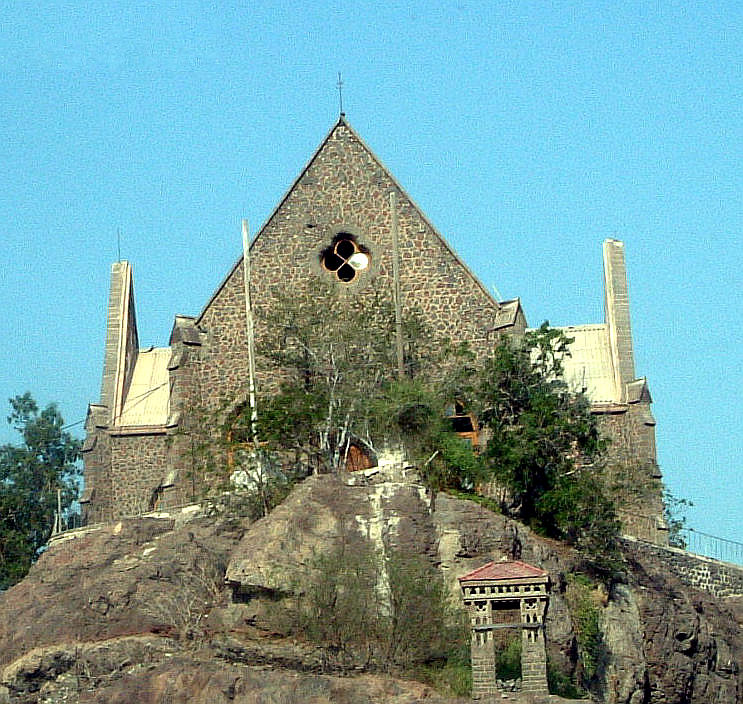
The building of the Legislative Council of Aden, built by the British in the 19th century as St. Mary's Church, was converted into the building of the Legislative Council in the 1960s, and is now a museum.

The British were looking for a coal depot to service their steamers en route to India. It took 700 tons of coal for a round-trip from Suez to Bombay. East India Company officials decided on Aden. The British Empire tried to reach an agreement with the Zaydi imam of Sanaa, permitting them a foothold in Mokha, and when unable to secure their position, they extracted a similar agreement from the Sultan of Lahej, enabling them to consolidate a position in Aden. The British managed to occupy Aden and evicted the Sultan of Lahej from Aden and forced him to accept their "protection". In November 1839, 5,000 tribesmen tried to retake the town but were repulsed and 200 were killed.

With emigrants from India, East Africa, and Southeast Asia, Aden grew into a world city. In 1850, only 980 Arabs were registered as original inhabitants of the city. The British presence in Aden put them at odds with the Ottomans. The Turks asserted to the British that they held sovereignty over the whole of Arabia, including Yemen, as the successor of Mohammed and the Chief of the Universal Caliphate.

The Ottomans were concerned about the British expansion from the British-ruled Indian subcontinent to the Red Sea and Arabia. They returned to the Tihamah in 1849 after an absence of two centuries. Rivalries and disturbances continued among the Zaydi imams, between them and their deputies, with the ulema, with the heads of tribes, as well as with those who belonged to other sects. Some citizens of Sanaa were desperate to return law and order to Yemen and asked the Ottoman Pasha in Tihamah to pacify the country. The opening of the Suez Canal in 1869 strengthened the Ottoman decision to remain in Yemen. By 1873, the Ottomans succeeded in conquering the northern highlands. Sanaa became the administrative capital of Yemen Vilayet.

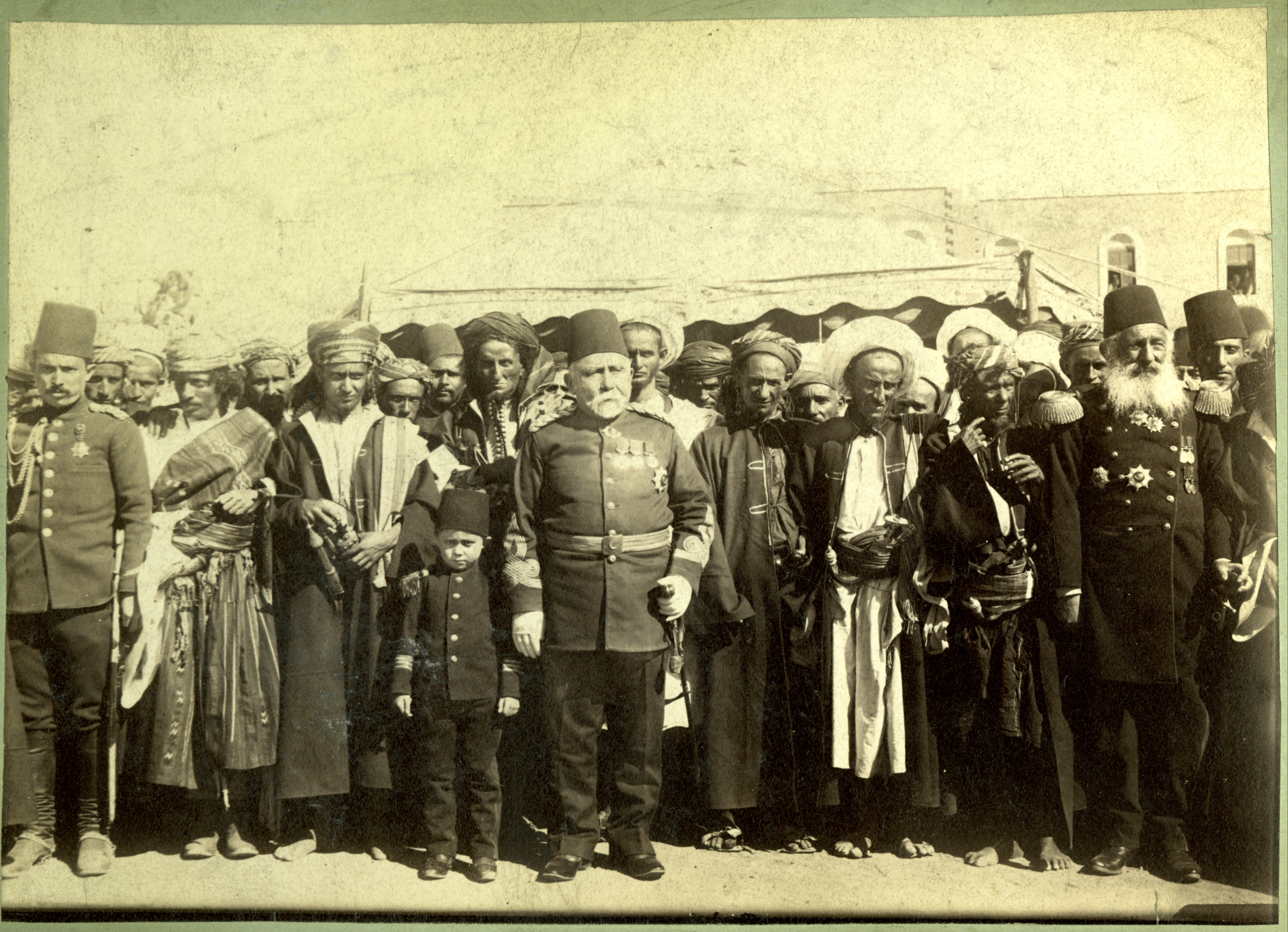
Ottoman soldiers with Yemeni locals, late 1800s

The Ottomans learned from their previous experience and worked on the disempowerment of local lords in the highland regions. They even attempted to secularise Yemeni society, while Yemenite Jews came to perceive themselves in Yemeni nationalist terms. The Ottomans appeased the tribes by forgiving their rebellious chiefs and appointing them to administrative posts. They introduced a series of reforms to enhance the country's economic welfare. However, corruption was widespread in the Ottoman administration in Yemen. This was because only the worst of the officials were appointed because those who could avoid serving in Yemen did so. The Ottomans had reasserted control over the highlands for a temporary duration. The so-called Tanzimat reforms were considered heretical by the Zaydi tribes. In 1876, the Hashid and Bakil tribes rebelled against the Ottomans; the Turks had to appease them with gifts to end the uprising.

The tribal chiefs were difficult to appease and an endless cycle of violence curbed Ottoman efforts to pacify the land. Ahmed Izzet Pasha proposed that the Ottoman army evacuate the highlands and confine itself to Tihamah, and not unnecessarily burden itself with continuing military operation against the Zaydi tribes. Imam Yahya Hamidaddin led a rebellion against the Turks in 1904; the rebels disrupted the Ottoman ability to govern. The revolts between 1904 and 1911 were especially damaging to the Ottomans, costing them as many as 10,000 soldiers and as much as 500,000 pounds per year. The Ottomans signed a treaty with imam Yahya Hamidaddin in 1911. Under the treaty, Imam Yahya was recognised as an autonomous leader of the Zaydi northern highlands. The Ottomans continued to rule Shafi'i areas in the mid-south until their departure in 1918.

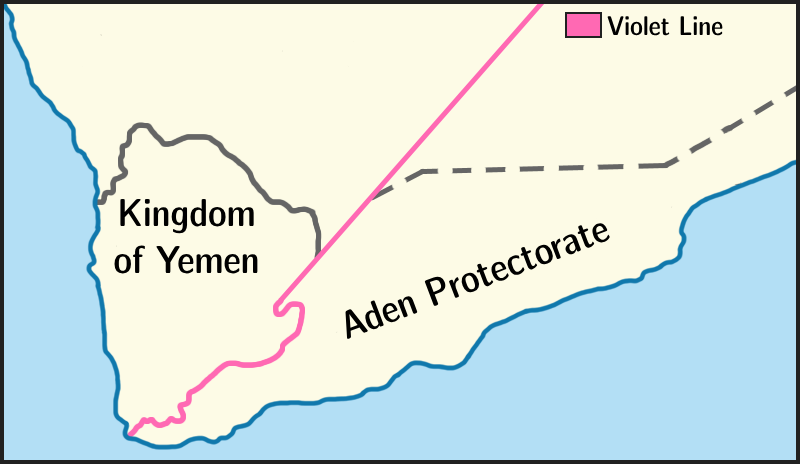
Map showing the Violet Line

In 1914, following the Anglo-Ottoman Convention of 1913, the British and the Ottomans divided Arabia into two parts: the northwest under Ottoman control and influence, and the southeast under British control and influence. A further agreement, which came to be later known as the Violet Line, was negotiated.

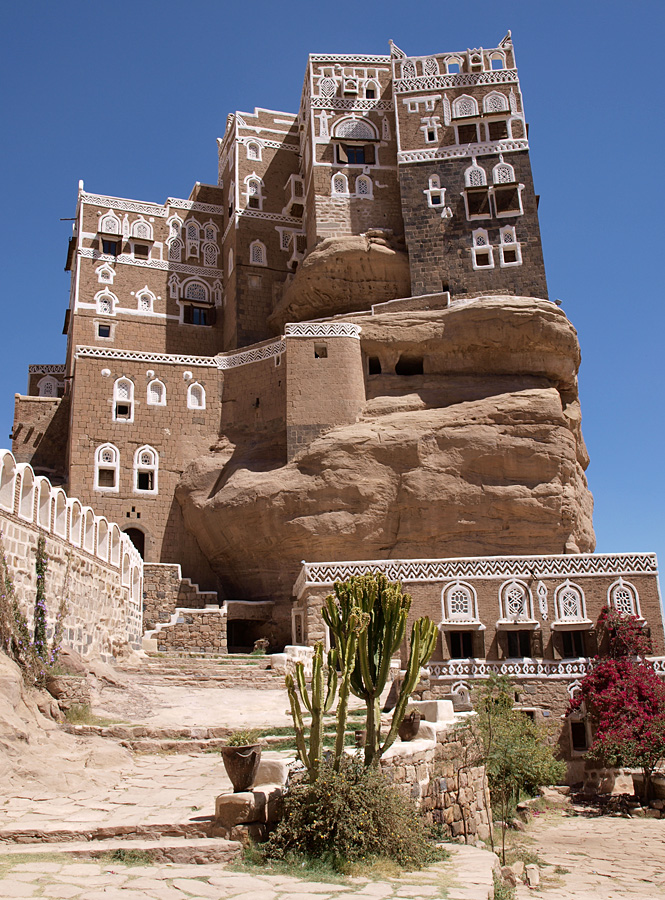
Dar al-Hajar, Imam Yahya Hamid Ed-Din's house near Sanaa

Imam Yahya hamid ed-Din al-Mutawakkil was ruling the northern highlands independently from 1911, from which he began a conquest of the Yemen lands. In 1925 Yahya captured al-Hudaydah from the Idrisids. In 1928, during the Anglo-Yemeni War, Yahya's forces were about 50 km (30 mi) away from Aden, Taiz, and Ibb, and were bombed by the British for five days; the imam had to pull back. Small Bedouin forces, mainly from the Madh'hij confederation of Marib, attacked Shabwah but were bombed by the British and had to retreat.

The Italian Empire was the first to recognise Yahya as the king of Yemen in 1926. This created a great deal of anxiety for the British, who interpreted it as recognition of Imam Yahya's claim to sovereignty over Greater Yemen, which included the Aden protectorate and Asir. The Idrisis turned to Ibn Saud seeking his protection from Yahya. However, in 1932, the Idrisis broke their accord with Ibn Saud and went back to Yahya seeking help against Ibn Saud, who had begun liquidating their authority and expressed his desire to annex those territories into his own Saudi domain. Yahya demanded the return of all Idrisi dominion.

Negotiations between Yahya and Ibn Saud proved fruitless. After the 1934 Saudi-Yemeni war, Ibn Saud announced a ceasefire in May 1934. Imam Yahya agreed to release Saudi hostages and the surrender of the Idrisis to Saudi custody. Imam Yahya ceded the three provinces of Najran, Asir, and Jazan for 20 years. and signed another treaty with the British government in 1934. The imam recognised the British sovereignty over Aden protectorate for 40 years. Out of fear for Hudaydah, Yahya did submit to these demands.

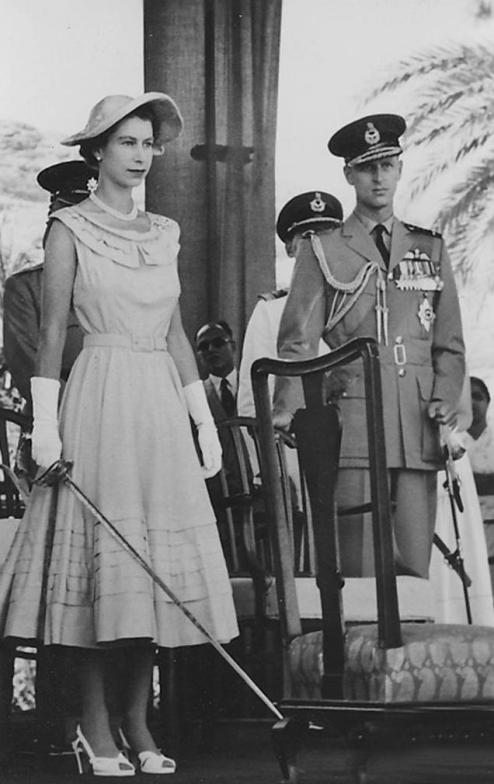
Queen Elizabeth II holding a sword, prepared to knight subjects in Aden as part of a 1954 visit. Prince Philip, Duke of Edinburgh is at right.

Starting in 1890, hundreds of Yemeni people from Hajz, Al-Baetha, and Taiz migrated to Aden to work at ports, and as labourers. This helped the population of Aden once again become predominantly Arab after, having been declared a free zone, it had become mostly foreigners. During World War II, Aden had increasing economic growth and became the second-busiest port in the world after New York City. After the rise of labour unions, a rift was apparent between the sectors of workers and the first signs of resistance to the occupation started in 1943. Muhammad Ali Luqman founded the first Arabic club and school in Aden, and was the first to start working towards a union.

The Colony of Aden was divided into an eastern colony and a western colony. Those were further divided into 23 sultanates and emirates, and several independent tribes that had no relationships with the sultanates. The deal between the sultanates and Britain detailed protection and complete control of foreign relations by the British. The Sultanate of Lahej was the only one in which the sultan was referred to as His Highness. The Federation of South Arabia was created by the British to counter Arab nationalism by giving more freedom to the rulers of the nations.

The North Yemen Civil War inspired many in the south to rise against the British rule. The National Liberation Front (NLF) of Yemen was formed with the leadership of Qahtan Muhammad Al-Shaabi. The NLF hoped to destroy all the sultanates and eventually unite with the Yemen Arab Republic. Most of the support for the NLF came from Radfan and Yafa, so the British launched Operation Nutcracker, which completely burned Radfan in January 1964.

=== Post-independence ===
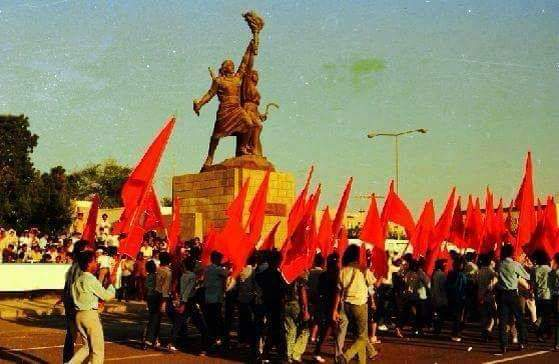
People celebrating the victory of the 14th October Revolution in South Yemen by waving red flags next to the Freedom Statue

Arab nationalism influenced some circles who opposed the lack of modernisation by the Mutawakkilite monarchy. This became apparent when Imam Ahmad bin Yahya died in 1962. He was succeeded by his son, but army officers attempted to seize power, sparking the North Yemen Civil War. The Hamidaddin royalists were supported by Saudi Arabia, Britain, and Jordan, whilst the military rebels were backed by Egypt. The supporters of the Hamidaddin royalists mostly gave them weapons and financial aid, but some small military forces were also deployed. Egypt provided the rebels with weapons and financial assistance, but also sent a large military force to participate in the fighting. Israel covertly supplied weapons to the royalists to keep the Egyptian military busy in Yemen. After six years of civil war, the military rebels formed the Yemen Arab Republic.

The revolution in the north coincided with the Aden Emergency, which ended British rule in the south. On 30 November 1967, the state of South Yemen was formed, comprising Aden and the former Protectorate of South Arabia. This socialist state was later officially known as the People's Democratic Republic of Yemen and a programme of nationalisation was begun.

Relations between the two Yemeni states fluctuated between peaceful and hostile. The South was supported by the Eastern Bloc. The North was unable to get similar connections. In 1972, the two states fought a war. The war was resolved with a ceasefire and negotiations were brokered by the Arab League, where it was declared that unification would eventually occur. In 1978, Ali Abdullah Saleh was named as president of the Yemen Arab Republic. After the war, the North complained about the South's help from foreign countries including Saudi Arabia.

In 1979, fighting between the two states resumed and unification efforts renewed. Thousands were killed in the South Yemen Civil War, in 1986. President Ali Nasser Muhammad fled to the north and was sentenced to death for treason. A new government formed.

Yemen Arab Republic (in orange) and the People's Democratic Republic of Yemen (in blue) before 1990. Land gained after unification is in grey.

In 1990, the two governments reached a full agreement on the joint governing of Yemen, and the countries were merged on 22 May 1990, with Saleh as president. The president of South Yemen, Ali Salem al-Beidh, became vice president. A unified parliament was formed and a unity constitution was agreed upon. In the 1993 parliamentary election, the first held after unification, the General People's Congress won 122 of 301 seats.

After the invasion of Kuwait crisis in 1990, Yemen's president opposed military intervention from non-Arab states. As a member of the United Nations Security Council for 1990 and 1991, Yemen abstained on a number of UNSC resolutions concerning Iraq and Kuwait and voted against the "...use of force resolution." The vote outraged the U.S., and Saudi Arabia expelled 800,000 Yemenis in 1990 and 1991 to punish Yemen for its opposition to the intervention.

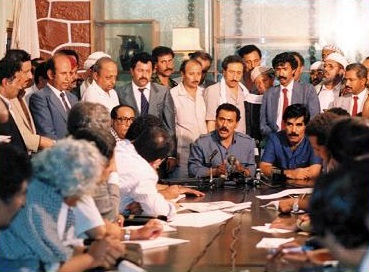
North Yemeni president, Ali Abdullah Saleh, with the Secretary-General of the Yemeni Socialist Party, Ali Salem al-Beidh, signing the unity agreement on 30 November 1989.

In the absence of strong state institutions, elite politics in Yemen constituted a de facto form of collaborative governance, where competing tribal, regional, religious, and political interests agreed to hold themselves in check through tacit acceptance of the balance it produced. The informal political settlement was held together by a power-sharing deal among three men: President Saleh, who controlled the state; major general Ali Mohsen al-Ahmar, who controlled the largest share of the Yemeni Armed Forces; and Abdullah ibn Husayn al-Ahmar, figurehead of the Islamist al-Islah party and Saudi Arabia's chosen broker of transnational patronage payments to various political players, including tribal sheikhs. The Saudi payments have been intended to facilitate the tribes' autonomy from the Yemeni government and to give the Saudi government a mechanism with which to weigh in on Yemen's political decision-making.

Following food riots in major towns in 1992, a new coalition government made up of the ruling parties from both the former Yemeni states was formed in 1993. However, Vice President al-Beidh withdrew to Aden in August 1993 and said he would not return to the government until his grievances were addressed. These included northern violence against his Yemeni Socialist Party, as well as the economic marginalisation of the south. Negotiations to end the political deadlock dragged on into 1994. The government of Prime Minister Haydar Abu Bakr Al-Attas became ineffective due to political infighting.

An accord between northern and southern leaders was signed in Amman, Jordan on 20 February 1994, but this could not stop the civil war. During these tensions, both the northern and southern armies (which had never integrated) gathered on their respective frontiers.

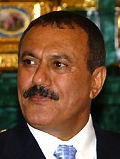
Ali Abdullah Saleh

Ali Abdullah Saleh became Yemen's first directly elected president in the 1999 presidential election, winning 96% of the vote. The only other candidate, Najeeb Qahtan Al-Sha'abi, was the son of Qahtan Muhammad al-Sha'abi, a former president of South Yemen. Though a member of Saleh's General People's Congress (GPC) party, Najeeb ran as an independent.

After the September 11 attacks on the United States, President Saleh assured U.S. President George W. Bush that Yemen was a partner in his war on terror. In 2001, violence surrounded a referendum, which apparently supported extending Saleh's rule and powers.

The Houthi insurgency in Yemen began in June 2004, when cleric Hussein Badreddin al-Houthi, head of the Zaydi sect, launched an uprising against the government. The Yemeni government said that the Houthis were seeking to overthrow it and to implement Shia law. The rebels countered that they were defending against anti-Shia persecution and government aggression. In 2005, at least 36 people were killed in clashes across the country between police and protesters over rising fuel prices. In the 2006 presidential election, Saleh won with 77% of the vote. His main rival, Faisal bin Shamlan, received 22%. Saleh was sworn in for another term on 27 September.

A series of bombing attacks occurred on police, official, diplomatic, foreign business, and tourism targets in 2008. In 2008, an opposition rally in Sanaa demanding electoral reform was met with police gunfire.

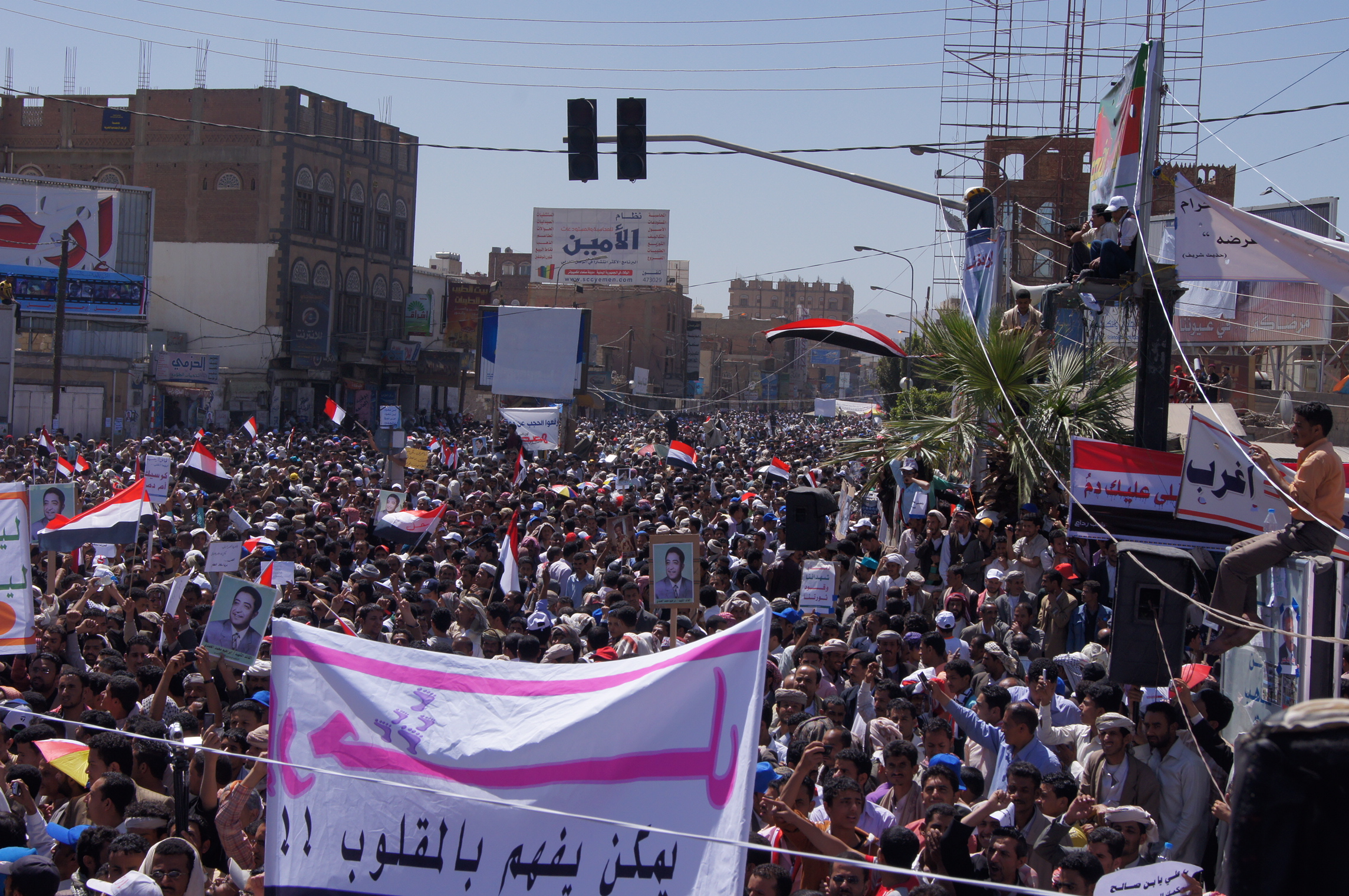
Tens of thousands of protesters marching to Sanaa University, joined for the first time by opposition parties, during the 2011–2012 Yemeni revolution

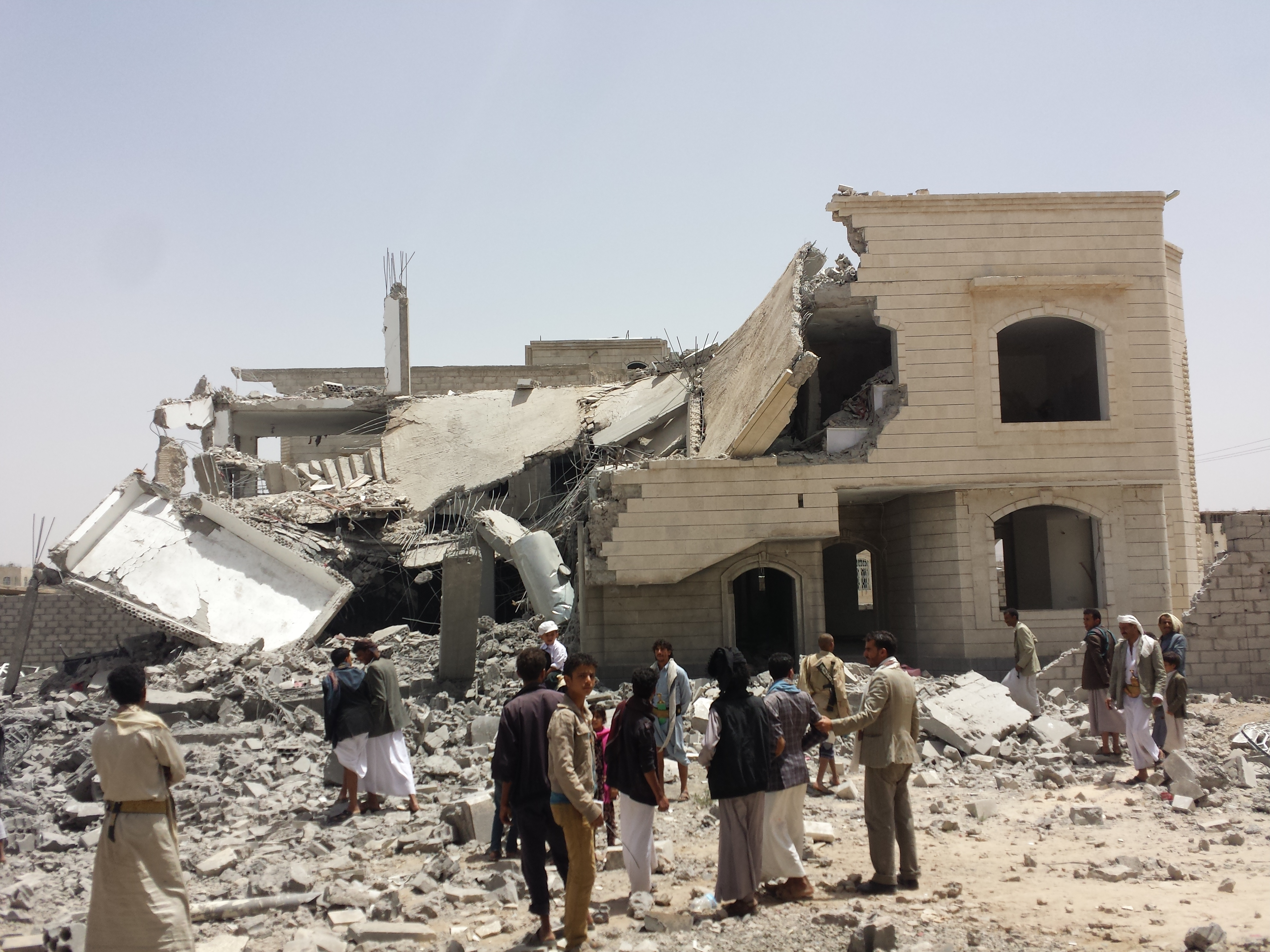
Saudi-led air strike on Sanaa, 12 June 2015

The 2011 Yemeni revolution followed other Arab Spring mass protests in early 2011. The uprising was initially against unemployment, economic conditions, and corruption, as well as against the government's proposals to modify the constitution of Yemen so that Saleh's son could inherit the presidency.

In March 2011, police snipers opened fire on a pro-democracy camp in Sanaa, killing more than 50 people. In May, dozens were killed in clashes between troops and tribal fighters in Sanaa. By this point, Saleh began to lose international support. In October 2011, Yemeni human rights activist Tawakul Karman won the Nobel Peace Prize, and the UN Security Council condemned the violence and called for a transfer of power. On 23 November 2011, Saleh flew to Riyadh, in neighbouring Saudi Arabia, to sign the Gulf Co-operation Council plan for political transition, which he had previously spurned. Upon signing the document, he agreed to legally transfer the office and powers of the presidency to his deputy, Vice President Abdrabbuh Mansur Hadi.

Hadi took office for a two-year term upon winning the uncontested presidential elections in February 2012. A unity government—including a prime minister from the opposition—was formed. Al-Hadi would oversee the drafting of a new constitution, followed by parliamentary and presidential elections in 2014. Saleh returned in February 2012. In the face of objections from thousands of street protesters, parliament granted him full immunity from prosecution. Saleh's son, General Ahmed Ali Abdullah Saleh, continues to exercise a strong hold on sections of the military and security forces.

By 2012, there was a "small contingent of U.S. special-operations troops"—in addition to CIA and "unofficially acknowledged" U.S. military presence—in response to increasing terror attacks by AQAP on Yemeni citizens. Many analysts have pointed out the former Yemeni government role in cultivating terrorist activity in the country. Following the election of President Abdrabbuh Mansur Hadi, the Yemeni military was able to push Ansar al-Sharia back and recapture the Shabwah Governorate.

Current (September 2026) political and military control in ongoing Yemeni Civil War: Controlled by the Government of Yemen (under the Presidential Leadership Council since April 2022) and allies Controlled by Houthis-led Supreme Political Council Controlled by Al-Qaeda (AQAP) and Islamic State of Iraq and the Levant-affiliated Ansar al-Sharia

The central government in Sanaa remained weak, staving off challenges from southern separatists and Houthis as well as AQAP. The Houthi insurgency intensified after Hadi took power, escalating in September 2014 as anti-government forces led by Abdul-Malik al-Houthi swept into the capital and forced Hadi to agree to a "unity" government. The Houthis then refused to participate in the government, although they continued to apply pressure on Hadi and his ministers, even shelling the president's private residence and placing him under house arrest, until the government's mass resignation in January 2015. The following month, the Houthis dissolved parliament and declared that a Revolutionary Committee under Mohammed Ali al-Houthi was the interim authority in Yemen. Abdul-Malik al-Houthi, a cousin of the acting president, called the takeover a "glorious revolution". However, the "constitutional declaration" of 6 February 2015 was widely rejected by opposition politicians and foreign governments, including the United Nations.

Hadi managed to flee from Sanaa to Aden, his hometown and stronghold in the south, on 21 February 2015. He promptly gave a televised speech rescinding his resignation, condemning the coup, and calling for recognition as the constitutional president of Yemen. The following month, Hadi declared Aden Yemen's "temporary" capital. The Houthis, however, rebuffed an initiative by the Gulf Cooperation Council and continued to move south toward Aden. All U.S. personnel were evacuated, and President Hadi was forced to flee the country to Saudi Arabia. On 26 March 2015, Saudi Arabia announced Operation Decisive Storm and began airstrikes and announced its intentions to lead a military coalition against the Houthis, who they claimed were being aided by Iran and began a force buildup along the Yemeni border. The coalition included the United Arab Emirates, Kuwait, Qatar, Bahrain, Jordan, Morocco, Sudan, Egypt, and Pakistan. The United States announced that it was assisting with intelligence, targeting, and logistics. After Hadi troops took control of Aden from Houthis, jihadist groups became active in the city, and some terrorist incidents were linked to them such as Missionaries of Charity attack in Aden on 4 March 2016. In February 2018, Aden was seized by the UAE-backed separatist Southern Transitional Council.

Yemen has been suffering from a famine since 2016 as a result of the civil war and the Saudi led blockade. More than 50,000 children in Yemen died from starvation in 2017. Numerous commentators have condemned the Saudi-led coalition's military campaign, including its blockade of Yemen, as genocide. The famine is being compounded by an outbreak of cholera that has affected more than one million people. The Saudi Arabian-led intervention in Yemen and blockade of Yemen have contributed to the famine and cholera epidemic. The UN estimated that by the end of 2021, the war in Yemen would have caused over 377,000 deaths, and roughly 70% of deaths were children under age 5.

On 4 December 2017, deposed strongman and former president Ali Abdullah Saleh, accused of treason, was assassinated by Houthis whilst attempting to flee clashes near rebel-held Sanaa between Houthi and pro-Saleh forces. After losing the support of the Saudi-led coalition, Yemen's President Abd Rabbuh Mansur Hadi resigned, and the Presidential Leadership Council took power in April 2022.

Following the outbreak of the Gaza war, the Houthis began to fire missiles at Israel and attack ships off Yemen's coast in the Red Sea. This was in solidarity with the Palestinians and aimed to facilitate entry of humanitarian aid into the Gaza Strip.

In June 2024, the UAE-backed STC received pressure to lease the Aden International Port to Abu Dhabi Ports. The move was opposed by Parliament and the public. A joint statement by 24 members of the Shura Council expressed categorical rejection of the lease agreement. Economists said the Emirates were attempting to control the Port of Aden and limit its activities in order to keep its own ports active. Governor of Aden, Tariq Salam also said the lease attempt aimed to devalue the port and reduce its international maritime status. Gulf of Aden Ports Corp had previously ended its agreement to manage two container terminals with Dubai Ports World in 2012, due to economic decline and failure of the latter to fulfill commitments.

Despite the STC embarking on an initially successful military campaign in late 2025, it was decisively defeated in early 2026 by a Yemeni government counter-offensive.

In early September 2026, the Houthis began a campaign in south-west Yemen, capturing the strategic port city of Mokha, the town of Dhubab and Perim Island, taking control of the strategic Bab el-Mandeb strait.

== Geography ==
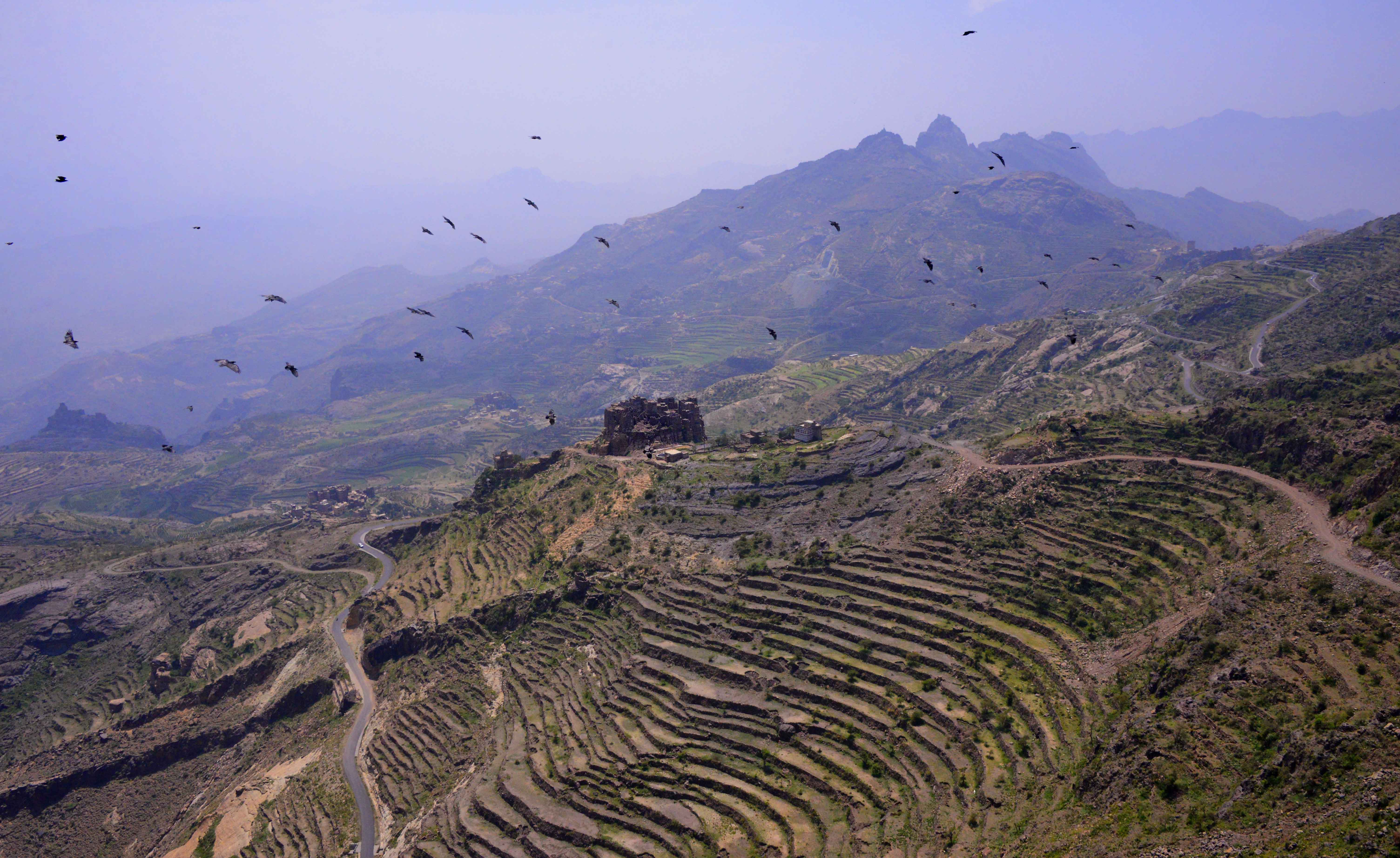
Agricultural terraces in the Haraz-Sarat Mountains

Yemen covers 455,000 km^{2} (175,676 sq mi) and is located at the southern part of the Arabian Peninsula. It is bordered by Saudi Arabia to the north, the Red Sea to the west, the Gulf of Aden and Guardafui Channel to the south, and Oman to the east.

Several Red Sea islands, including the Hanish Islands, Kamaran, and Perim, as well as Socotra in the Arabian Sea, belong to Yemen; the largest of these is Socotra. Many of the islands are volcanic; Jabal al-Tair Island had volcanic eruptions in 1883 and 2007. Although mainland Yemen is in the southern Arabian Peninsula and thus part of Asia, and its Hanish Islands and Perim in the Red Sea are associated with Asia, the archipelago of Socotra, which lies east of the Horn of Africa and is much closer to Africa than to Asia, is geographically and bio-geographically associated with Africa.

=== Regions and climate ===
Yemen's Köppen climate classification map is based on temperature, precipitation and their seasonality.: BWh Hot desert BWk Cold desert BSh Hot semi-arid BSk Cold semi-arid CWb Subtropical highland

Yemen can be divided geographically into four main regions: the coastal plains in the west, the western highlands, the eastern highlands, and the Rub' al Khali in the east. The Tihamah ("hot lands" or "hot earth") form a very arid and flat coastal plain along Yemen's entire Red Sea coastline. Despite the aridity, numerous lagoons make this region very marshy and a suitable breeding ground for malaria-bearing mosquitos. Extensive crescent-shaped sand dunes are present. The evaporation in the Tihamah is so great that streams from the highlands never reach the sea, but they do contribute to extensive groundwater reserves. Today, these are heavily exploited for agricultural use.

Near the village of Madar about 50 km (30 mi) north of Sanaa, dinosaur footprints were found, indicating that the area was once a muddy flat. The Tihamah ends abruptly at the escarpment of the western highlands. This area, now heavily terraced to meet the demand for food, receives the highest rainfall in Arabia, rapidly increasing from 100 mm (3.9 in) per year to about 760 mm (29.9 in) in Taiz and over 1,000 mm (39.4 in) in Ibb. Temperatures are warm in the day but fall dramatically at night.

The central highlands are an extensive high plateau over 2,000 m (6,562 ft) in elevation. This area is drier than the western highlands because of rain-shadow influences, but still receives sufficient rain in wet years for extensive cropping. Water storage allows for irrigation and the growing of wheat and barley. Sanaa is in this region. The highest point in Yemen and Arabia is Jabal An-Nabi Shu'ayb, at about 3,666 m (12,028 ft). Yemen's portion of the Rub al Khali desert in the east is much lower, generally below 1,000 m (3,281 ft), and receives almost no rain. It is populated only by Bedouin herders of camels.

Although Yemen has contributed little to causing climate change, it is one of the world's most vulnerable countries to climate change and among the least prepared to handle its effects. Around half of the population is exposed to at least one major climate threat. Climate change impacts in Yemen include increasing temperatures, drought, desertification, disease outbreaks and sea level rise. Extreme weather events like cyclones, floods and landslides have been intensifying in Yemen as a result of climate change. These impacts have already worsened the country's existing water scarcity issues, decreased agricultural and fishery productivity and affected the food security and health of Yemenites.

Yemen is one of only three countries that has not yet joined the Paris Agreement and has not submitted any Nationally Determined Contributions, although they did submit an intended NDC in 2015. To help the country adapt to climate change, The World Bank recommends investments in disaster risk management strategies, renewable energy, water management, soil conservation and climate smart agriculture. However, Yemen faces challenges in accessing climate finance due to low institutional capacity and poor stakeholder coordination.

=== Biodiversity ===
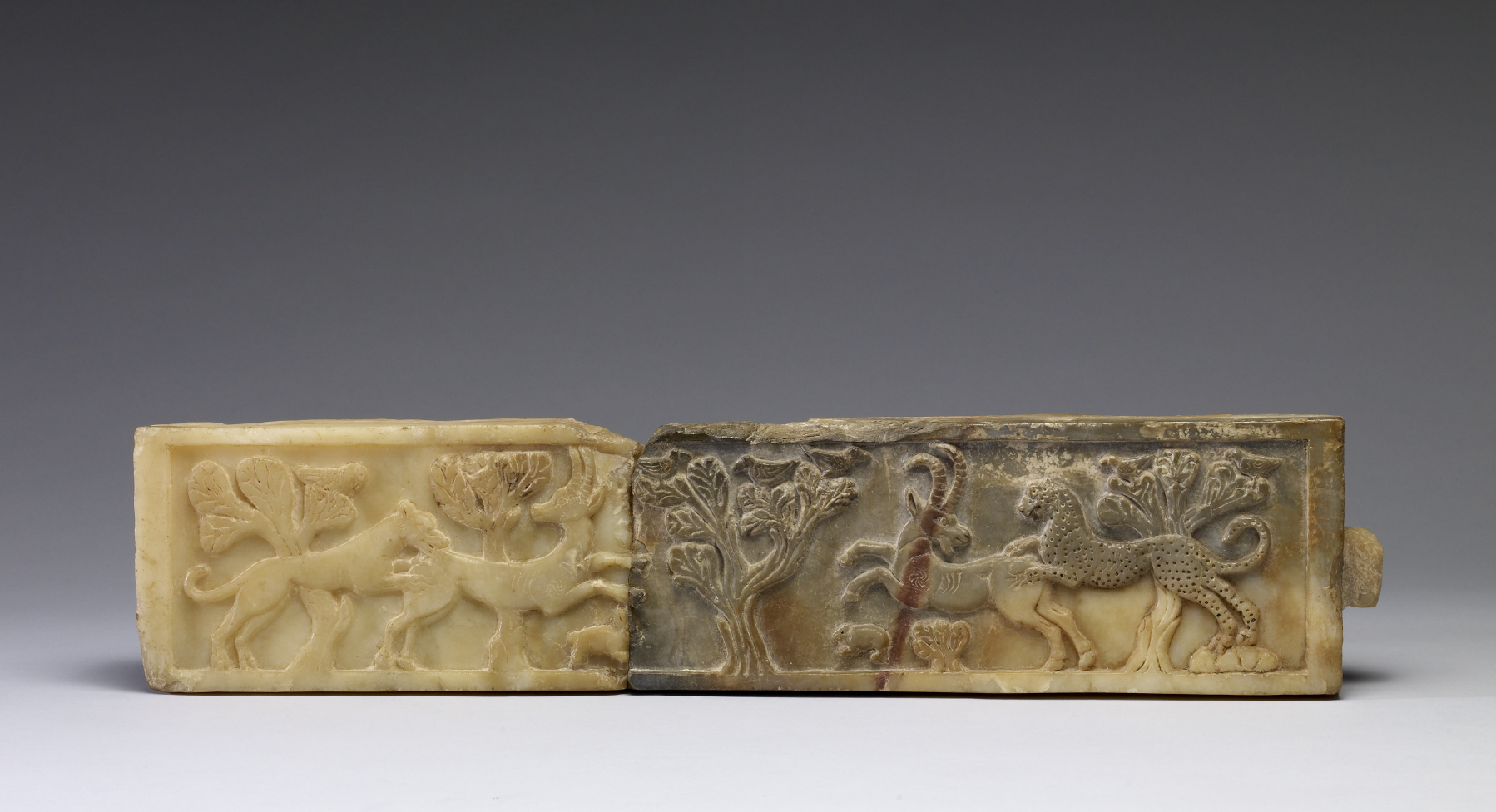
A South Arabian relief from the fifth century BC, in Walters Art Museum. On the left side, a lion attacks a gazelle, while a rabbit tries to jump away from the gazelle's forelegs. On the right, a leopard jumps down from rocks onto the back of an ibex; a small rodent flees the hooves of the ibex. Birds in the branches of acacia trees observe the two scenes.

Yemen contains six terrestrial ecoregions: Arabian Peninsula coastal fog desert, Socotra Island xeric shrublands, Southwestern Arabian foothills savannah, Southwestern Arabian montane woodlands, Arabian Desert, and Red Sea Nubo-Sindian tropical desert and semi-desert. The flora is a mixture of the tropical African, Sudanian plant geographical region and the Saharo-Arabian region. The Sudanian element—characterised by relatively high rainfall—dominates the western mountains and parts of the highland plains. The Saharo-Arabian element dominates in the coastal plains, eastern mountain, and the eastern and northern desert plains.

A high percentage of Yemen plants belong to tropical African plants of Sudanian regions. Among the Sudanian element species, the following may be mentioned: Ficus spp., Acacia mellifera, Grewia villosa, Commiphora spp., Rosa abyssinica, Cadaba farinosa and others. Among the Saharo-Arabian species, these may be mentioned: Panicum turgidum, Aerva javanica, Zygophyllum simplex, Fagonia indica, Salsola spp., Acacia tortilis, A. hamulos, A. ehrenbergiana, Phoenix dactylifera, Hyphaene thebaica, Capparis decidua, Salvadora persica, Balanites aegyptiaca, and many others. Many of the Saharo-Arabian species are endemic to the extensive sandy coastal plain (the Tihamah).

The Arabian leopard, which would inhabit the mountains, is considered rare here.

== Government and politics ==
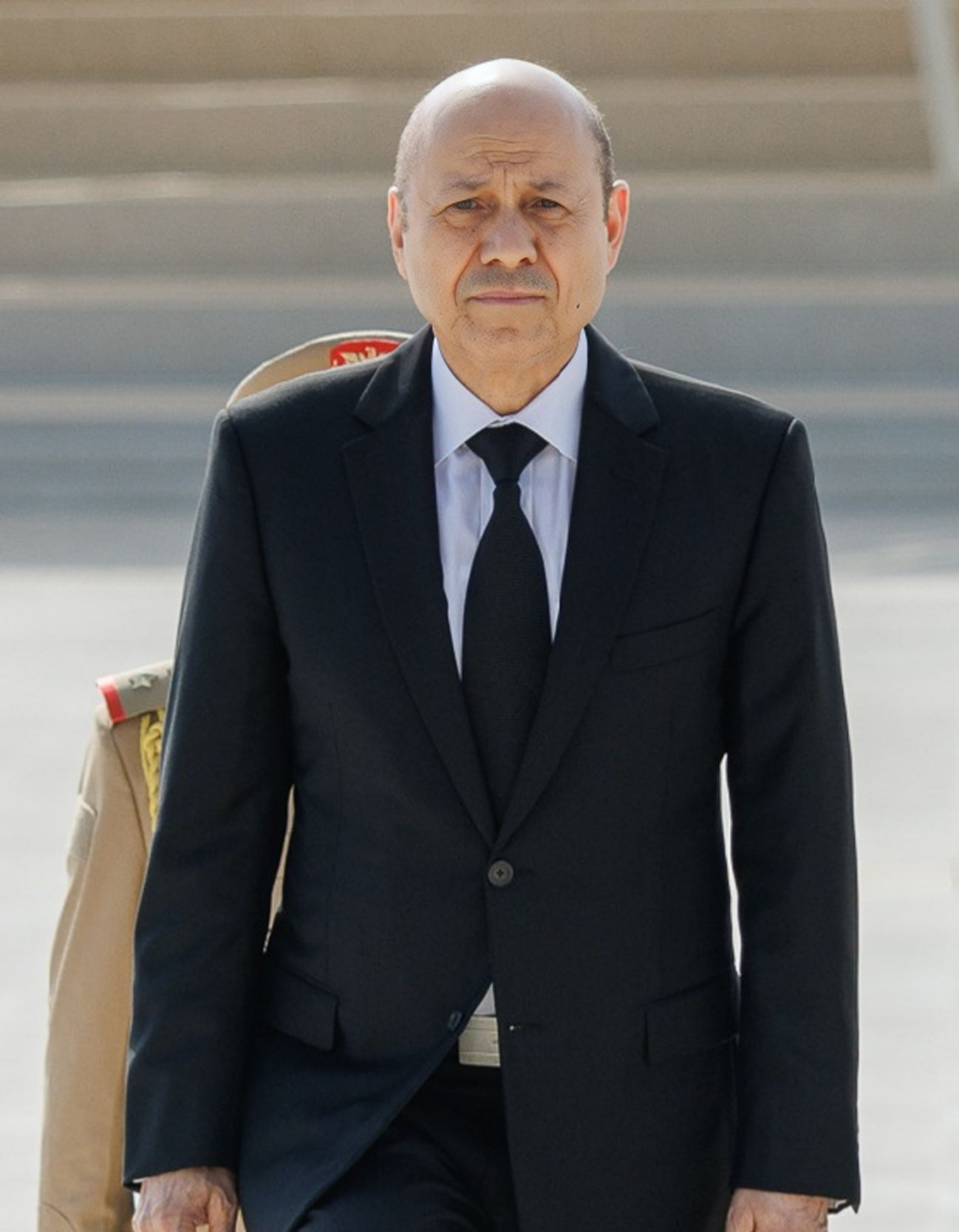
Rashad al-Alimi
President of the Presidential Leadership Council

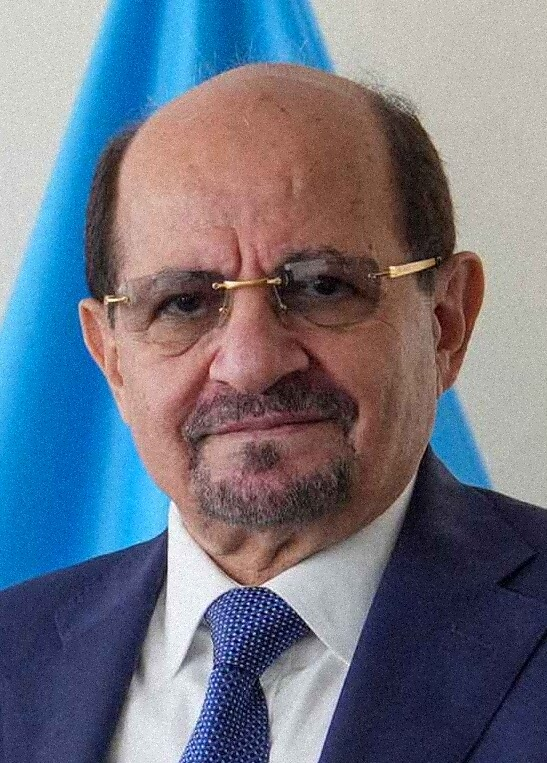
Shaea al-Zindani
Prime Minister

Yemen is a unitary semi-presidential republic with a bicameral legislature. Under the 1991 constitution, an elected president, an elected 301-seat Assembly of Representatives, and an appointed 111-member Shura Council share power. The president is the head of state, and the prime minister is the head of government. In Sanaa, a Supreme Political Council (not recognised internationally) forms a government for Houthi-controlled territory of Yemen.

The 1991 constitution provides that the president be elected by popular vote from at least two candidates endorsed by at least 15 members of the Parliament. The prime minister, in turn, is appointed by the president and must be approved by two-thirds of the Parliament. The presidential term of office is seven years, and the parliamentary term of elected office is six years. Suffrage is universal for people aged 18 and older, but only Muslims may hold elected office.

President Ali Abdullah Saleh became the first elected president in reunified Yemen in 1999 (though he had been president of unified Yemen since 1990 and president of North Yemen since 1978). He was re-elected to office in September 2006. Saleh's victory was marked by an election that international observers judged was "partly free", though the election was accompanied by violence, violations of press freedoms, and allegations of fraud. Parliamentary elections were held in April 2003, and the General People's Congress maintained a supermajority. Saleh remained almost uncontested in his seat of power until 2011, when local frustration at his refusal to hold another round of elections, as combined with the consequences of the 2011 Arab Spring, resulted in mass protests. In 2012, he was forced to resign from power, though he remained an important factor in Yemeni politics, allying with the Houthis during their takeover in the mid-2010s.

The constitution calls for an independent judiciary. The former northern and southern legal codes have been unified. The legal system includes separate commercial courts and a Supreme Court based in Sanaa. Sharia is the main source of laws, with many court cases being debated according to the religious basis of law and many judges being religious scholars as well as legal authorities. The Prison Authority Organization Act, Republican decree no. 48 (1981), and Prison Act regulations, provide the legal framework for management of the country's prison system.

According to International IDEA's Global State of Democracy (GSoD) Indices and Democracy Tracker, Yemen performs in the low range on overall democratic measures, with particular weaknesses in political representation, including elected government and effective parliament.

=== Administrative divisions ===
Governorates of Yemen

Yemen is divided into twenty-one governorates (muhafazat) plus one municipality called "Amanat Al-Asemah" (the latter containing the constitutional capital, Sanaa). An additional governorate (Soqatra Governorate) was created in December 2013 comprising Socotra Island, previously part of Hadramaut Governorate. The governorates are subdivided into 333 districts (muderiah), which are subdivided into 2,210 sub-districts, and then into 38,284 villages (as of 2001).

Map of the proposed Federal Regions of Yemen

In 2014, a constitutional panel decided to divide the country into six regions—four in the north, two in the south, and capital Sanaa outside of any region—creating a federalist model of governance. This federal proposal was a contributing factor toward the Houthis' subsequent coup d'état against the government.

=== Foreign relations ===
Yemen is a member of the United Nations, the Arab League, and the Organisation of Islamic Cooperation, and also participates in the nonaligned movement. Yemen has acceded to the Treaty on the Non-Proliferation of Nuclear Weapons.

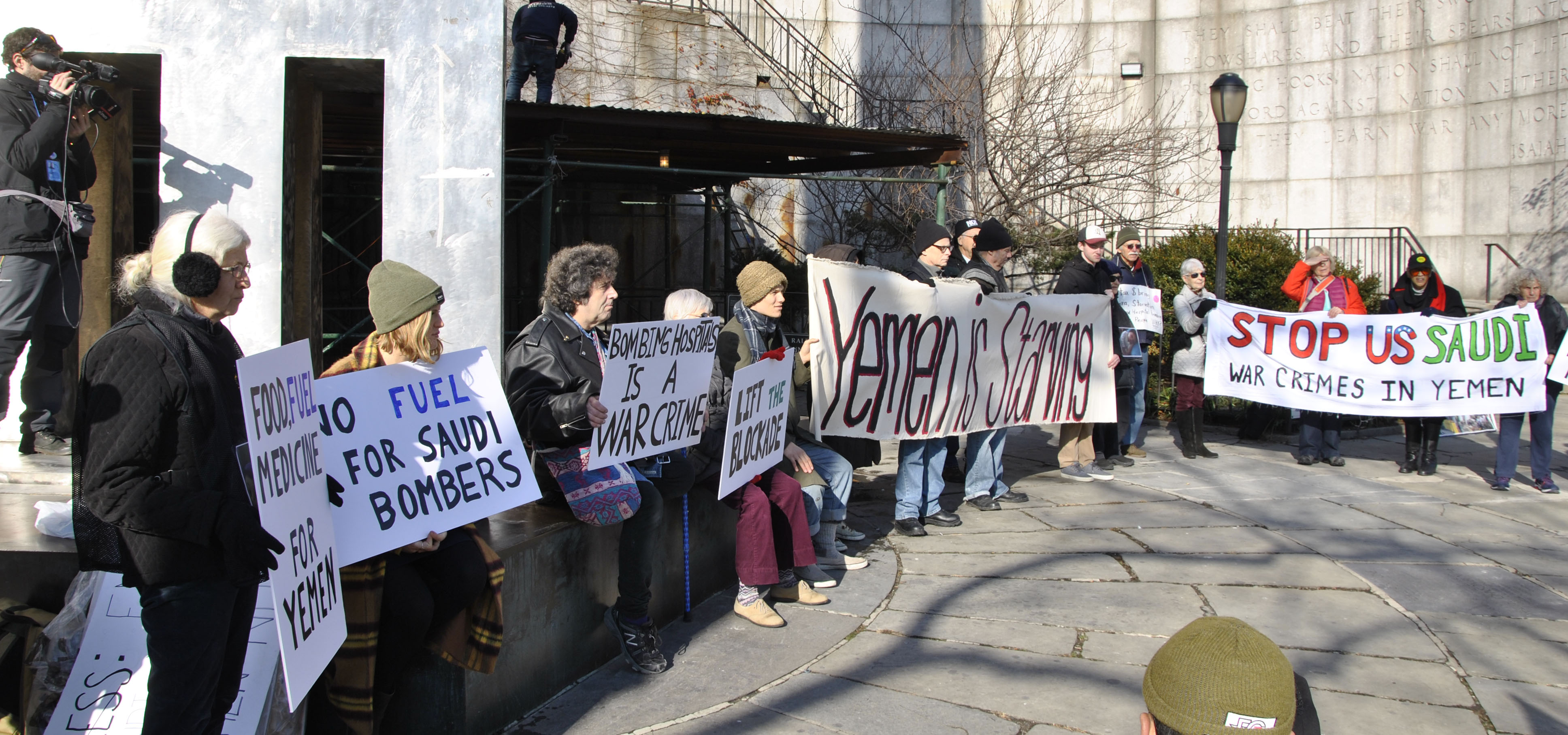
Protest against Saudi blockade of Yemen, New York City, 2017

Since the end of the 1994 civil war, tangible progress has been made on the diplomatic front in restoring normal relations with Yemen's neighbours. In the summer of 2000, Yemen and Saudi Arabia signed an International Border Treaty settling a 50-year-old dispute over the location of the border between the two countries. Yemen's northern border had been undefined; the Arabian Desert prevented any human habitation there. The Saudi–Yemen barrier was constructed by Saudi Arabia in 2004, who claimed that pro-Al Qaeda militants, drugs, and weapons were entering the country from Yemen.

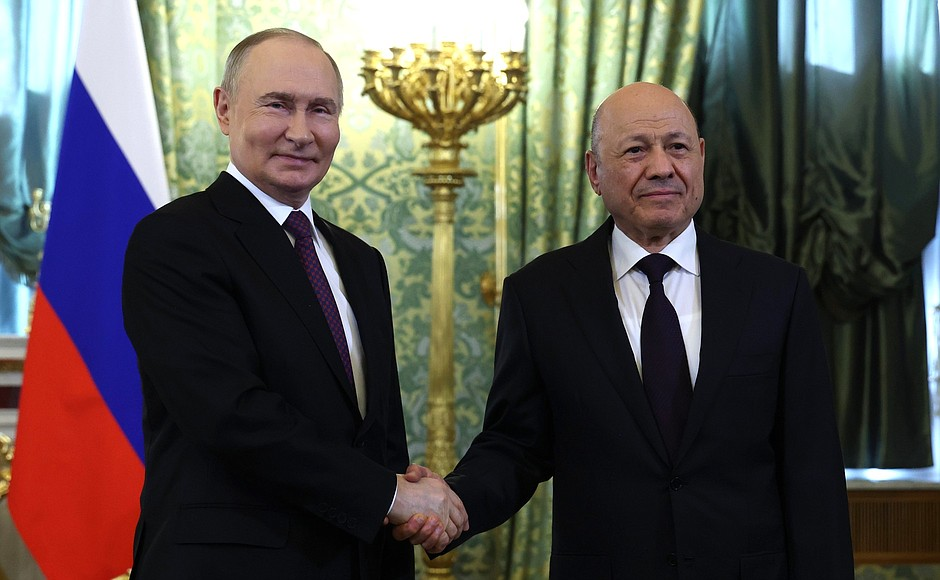
President Rashad al-Alimi with Russian president Vladimir Putin on 28 May 2025

In March 2020, the Trump administration and key U.S. allies, including Saudi Arabia and the United Arab Emirates, cut off tens of millions of dollars for health care programmes and other aid to the United Nations' appeal for Yemen. As a result of funding cuts, the United Nations Office for the Coordination of Humanitarian Affairs stated that the UN agencies were forced to either close or reduce more than 75 per cent of its programmes that year alone, affecting more than 8 million people. Saudi Arabia had been leading a Western-backed military coalition, including the United Arab Emirates as a key member, which intervened in Yemen in 2015, in a bid to restore the government ousted from power by the Houthi movement. The United Nations described the situation in Yemen, where the war killed tens of thousands of people and left millions on the brink of famine, as the world's worst humanitarian crisis.

In January 2024, President Joe Biden announced that the United States, Britain and allies Australia, Bahrain, Canada and the Netherlands had launched a military assault on Houthi militant targets in Yemen.

=== Military ===
The military forces include the Yemeni Army (including the Republican Guard), Yemeni Navy (including the Marines) and the Yemeni Air Force (including the Air Defense Force) and the Strategic Reserve Forces & Unmanned Aviation Forces. Since the start of the current civil war in 2014, the armed forces have been divided; at first between loyalists of the former president Ali Abdullah Saleh and pro-Yemeni government forces of president Abdrabbuh Mansour Hadi; as of 2025, between the internationally recognised Presidential Leadership Council (PLC), and the Houthi-led Supreme Political Council (SPC). Per the constitution, the President of Yemen serves as the commander-in-chief. Currently, the presidency and supreme command of the armed forces is disputed between Rashad al-Alimi, Chairman of the PLC, and Mahdi al-Mashat, chairman of the SPC. Before the civil war, the united military was headquartered in the country's capital, Sanaa.

Already before 2014, the number of military personnel in Yemen was relatively high; in sum, Yemen had the second largest military force on the Arabian Peninsula after Saudi Arabia. In 2012, total active troops were estimated as follows: army, 66,700; navy, 7,000; and air force, 5,000. In September 2007, the government announced the reinstatement of compulsory military service. Yemen's defence budget, which in 2006 represented approximately 40 percent of the total government budget, is expected to remain high for the near term, as the military draft takes effect and internal security threats continue to escalate.

=== Human rights ===
Corruption in Yemen is such that it ranked 176 out of 180 countries in the 2022 Corruption Perceptions Index. The government and its security forces have been responsible for torture, inhumane treatment, and extrajudicial executions. There are arbitrary arrests of citizens, especially in the south, as well as arbitrary searches of homes. Prolonged pretrial detention is a serious problem, and judicial corruption, inefficiency, and executive interference undermine due process. Freedom of speech, the press, and religion are all restricted. Journalists critical of the government are often harassed and threatened by the police. Homosexuality is illegal and punishable by death.

Yemen is ranked last of 135 countries in the 2012 Global Gender Gap Report. Human Rights Watch reported on discrimination and violence against women as well as on the abolition of the minimum marriage age of 15 for women. The onset of puberty (interpreted by some to be as low as the age of nine) was set as a requirement for marriage instead. Publicity about the case of ten-year-old Yemeni divorcee Nujood Ali brought the child marriage issue to the forefront worldwide.

In 2017, the UN Human Rights Council voted to create a team of experts to investigate suspected breaches of humanitarian law and human rights in Yemen. In December 2021, The Guardian revealed, Saudi Arabia used "incentives and threats" as part of a pressure campaign to end a UN inquiry into human rights infringements in Yemen. In June 2020, a human rights group revealed the scale of torture and deaths in Yemen's unofficial detention centres. UAE and Saudi forces were responsible for some of the most widely condemned treatment of prisoners, including being hung upside down for hours and sexual torture such as the burning of genitals.

According to 2020 United Nations Population Fund (UNFPA) estimates, 6.1 million girls and women were in need of gender-based violence services. The UNFPA also reported a rise in gender-based violence cases amid COVID-19 pandemic, increase in rate of child marriages, most acutely among internally displaced persons (IDPs). One in five girls aged 10 to 19 were married in IDP camps, compared to 1 in 8 in host communities.

The United States Department of State 2013 Trafficking in Persons report classified Yemen as a Tier 3 country, meaning that its government does not fully comply with the minimum standards against human trafficking and is not making significant efforts to do so. Yemen officially abolished slavery in Yemen in 1962, but it is still being practiced. On 22 June 2020, Human Rights Watch wrote an open letter to the UN Secretary-General to improve the protection of children in Yemen. Amnesty said, United Nations Security Council must urgently fix its monitoring and reporting mechanism for children affected by armed conflict. On 14 September 2020, Human Rights Watch demanded an end to interference with Yemeni aid operations, as millions of lives were put at risk.

== Economy ==
Historical GDP per capita development

Since its unification in 1990, Yemen has been one of the poorest countries in the Middle East. As of 2013 Yemen had a GDP (PPP) of US$61.63 billion, with an income per capita of $2,500. Services are the largest economic sector (61.4% of GDP), followed by the industrial sector (30.9%), and agriculture (7.7%). Of these, petroleum production represents around 25% of GDP and 63% of the government's revenue. After the start of the civil war in 2014, its GDP dropped rapidly by over 50%, thanks to the blockade led by Saudi Arabia and an effective embargo on oil exports imposed by the Houthis.

=== Agriculture ===
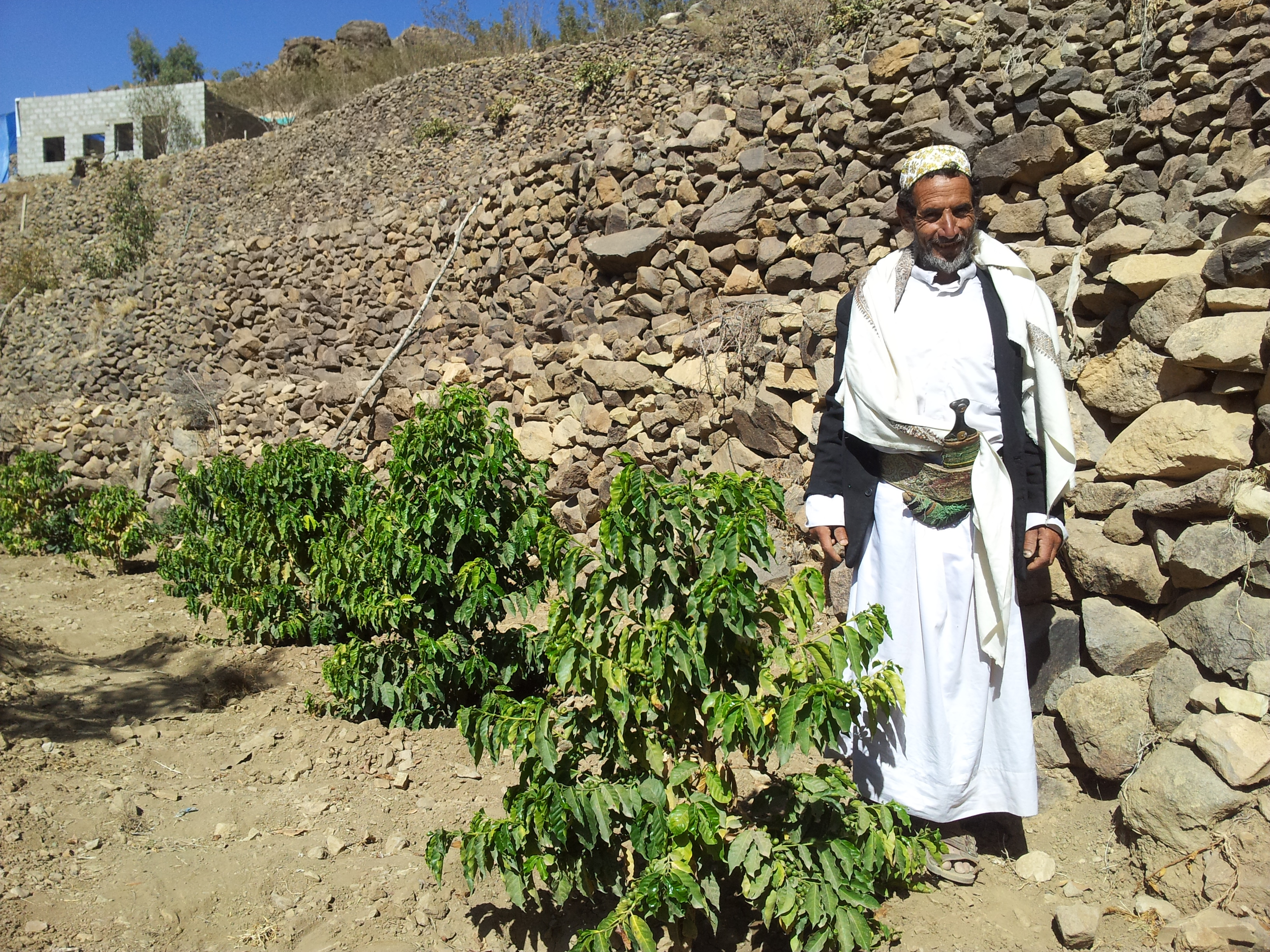
A coffee plantation in Yemen

Principal agricultural commodities produced include grain, vegetables, fruits, pulses, qat, coffee, cotton, dairy products, fish, livestock (sheep, goats, cattle, camels), and poultry. Most Yemenis are employed in agriculture. However, the role of agricultural sector is limited by the relatively low share of the sector in GDP and the large share of net food-buying households (97%). Sorghum is the most common crop. Cotton and many fruit trees are also grown, with mangoes being the most valuable.

A big problem in Yemen is the cultivation of Khat (or qat), a psychoactive plant that releases a stimulant when chewed, and accounts for up to 40 percent of the water drawn from the Sanaa Basin each year, and that figure is rising. Some agricultural practices are drying the Sanaa Basin and displaced vital crops, which has resulted in increasing food prices. Rising food prices, in turn, pushed an additional six percent of the country into poverty in 2008 alone, and led to food riots starting in 2008 in poorer cities. Efforts are being made by the government and Dawoodi Bohra community at northern governorates to replace qat with coffee plantations.

=== Export and import ===
In 2013, exports totalled $6.694 billion. The main export commodities are crude oil, coffee, dried and salted fish, liquefied natural gas. These products were mainly sent to China (41%), Thailand (19.2%), India (11.4%), and South Korea (4.4%). Imports totalled $10.97 billion. The main imported commodities are machinery and equipment, foodstuffs, livestock, and chemicals. These products were mainly imported from the EU (48.8%), UAE (9.8%), Switzerland (8.8%), China (7.4%), and India (5.8%).

=== State budget ===
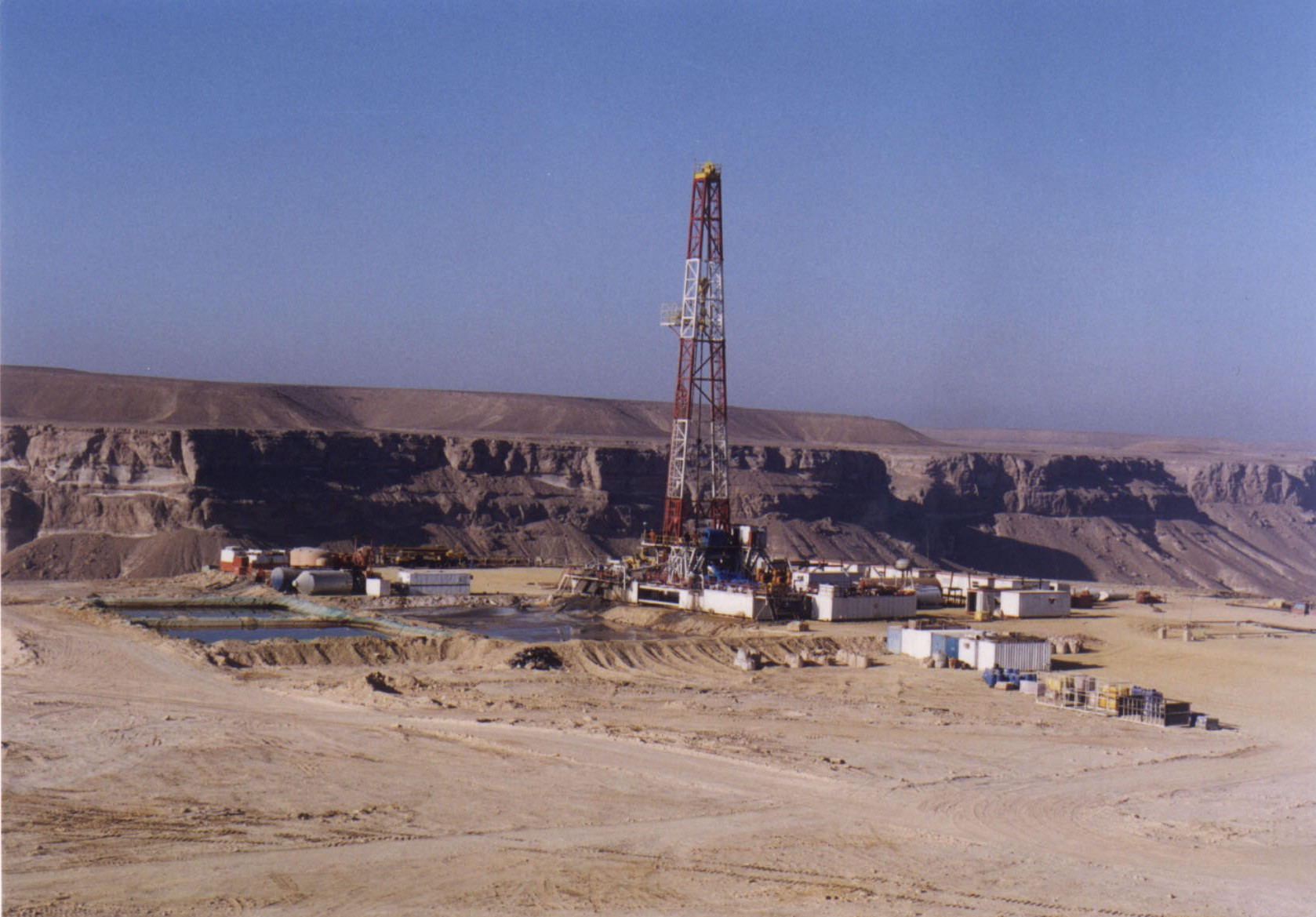
Drilling for oil using a land rig

As of 2013, the government's budget consisted of $7.769 billion in revenues and $12.31 billion in expenditures. Taxes and other revenues constituted roughly 17.7% of the GDP, with a budget deficit of 10.3%. The public debt was 47.1% of GDP. Yemen had reserves of foreign exchange and gold of around $5.538 billion in 2013. Its inflation rate over the same period based on consumer prices was 11.8%. The external debt totalled $7.806 billion. Yemen is missing some international support because, as of 2024, it is one of three countries which have not ratified the Paris Agreement to limit climate change.

=== Water supply and sanitation ===
A key challenge is severe water scarcity, especially in the Highlands, prompting The Times, in 2009, to write "Yemen could become first nation to run out of water." A second key challenge is a high level of poverty, making it difficult to recover the costs of service provision. Access to water supply sanitation is low. Yemen is both the poorest country and the most water-scarce country in the Arab world. Third, the capacity of sector institutions to plan, build, operate and maintain infrastructure remains limited. Last but not least the security situation makes it even more difficult to improve or even maintain existing levels of service.

The average Yemeni has access to only 140 cubic metres of water per year (101 gallons per day) for all uses, while the Middle Eastern average is 1,000 m^{3}/yr, and the internationally defined threshold for water stress is 1,700 cubic metres per year. Groundwater is the main source of water in the country, but the water tables have dropped severely leaving Yemen without a viable source of water. For example, in Sanaa, the water table was 30 metres (98 feet) below surface in the 1970s but had dropped to 1,200 metres (3,900 feet) below the surface by 2012. The groundwater has not been regulated by Yemen's governments.

Even before the revolution, Yemen's water situation had been described as increasingly dire by experts who worried that Yemen would be the first country to run out of water. In part due to the 2015 Yemeni civil war, the infrastructure required to build better access to water has been delayed in construction. It is estimated that as many as 80% of the population struggles to access water to drink and bathe. Bombing has forced many Yemenis to leave their homes for other areas, leaving wells in the new areas under increasing demands.

Together with partners, UNICEF has advanced its efforts and provided access to safe and sustained drinking water to 8.8 million people (5.3 million children). It scaled up its emergency WASH assistance in Yemen to ensure sustainable WASH services through capacity building of local WASH authorities, solarisation of water systems and rainwater harvesting.

== Demographics ==
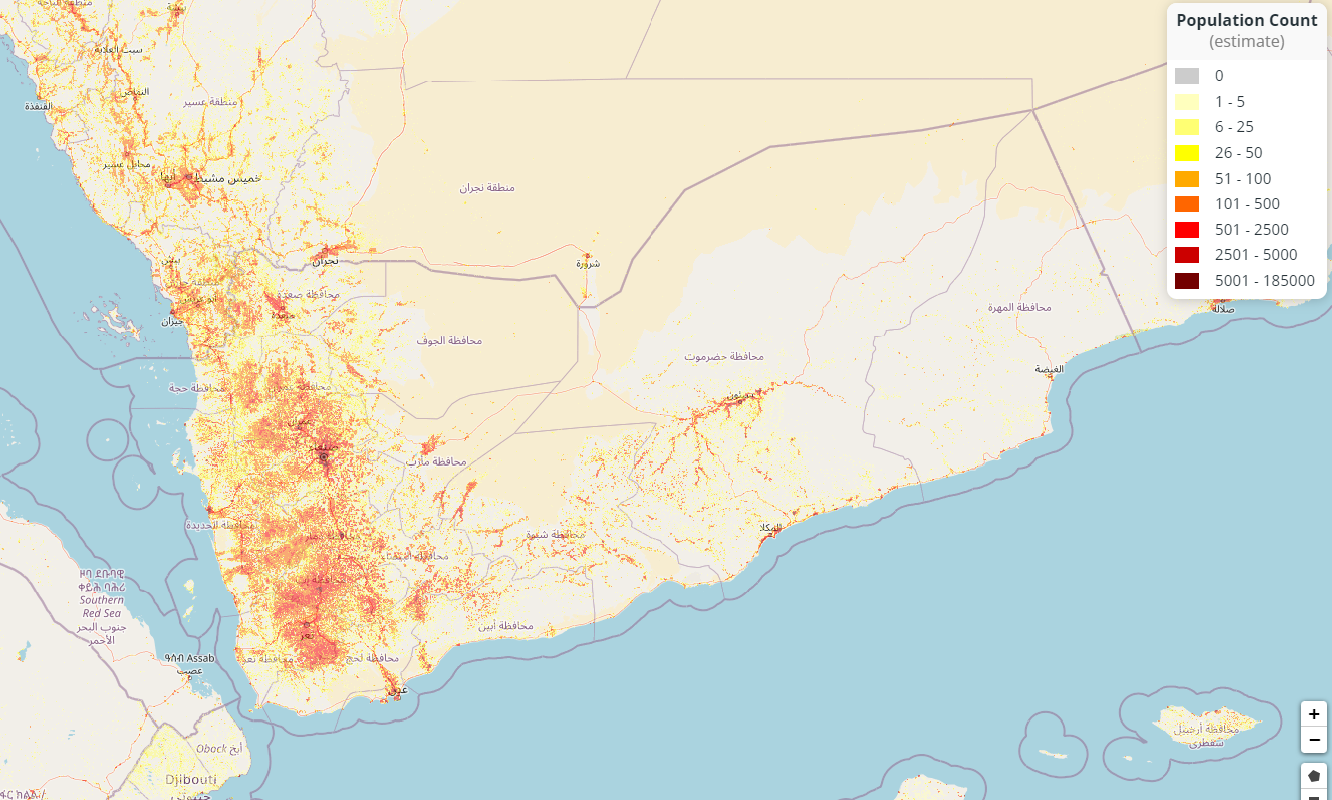
Population density of Yemen in 2022

Yemen's population is 33 million by 2021 estimates, with 46% of the population being under 15 years old and 2.7% above 65 years. In 1950, it was 4.3 million. By 2050, the population is estimated to increase to about 60 million. Yemen has a high total fertility rate, at 4.45 children per woman. Sanaa's population has increased rapidly, from roughly 55,000 in 1978 to nearly 1 million in the early 21st century.

=== People ===
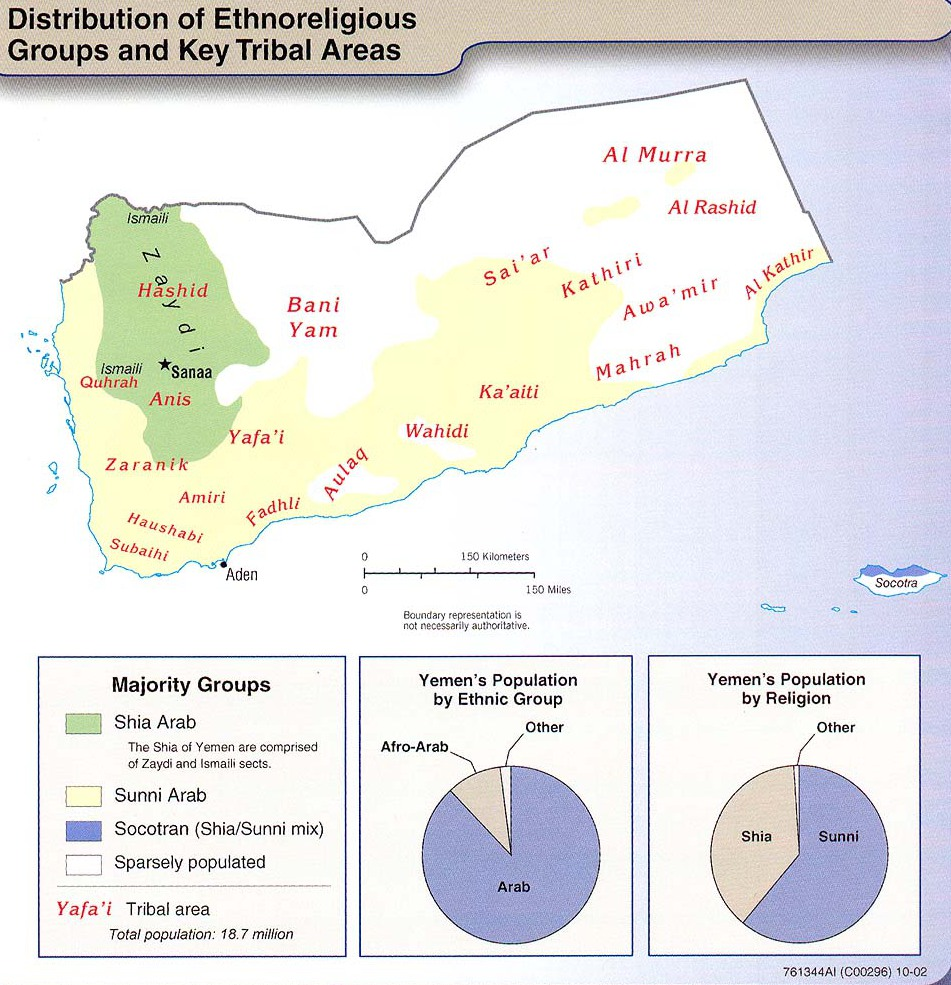
Yemen's tribal areas and Shia/Sunni regions. Shia Muslims are predominant in the green area of Yemen's west, with the rest of Yemen being Sunni Muslims

When the states of North and South Yemen were established, most minority groups departed. Yemen is a largely tribal society. There are also hereditary caste groups in urban areas, such as the Akhdam.

An estimated 100,000 Indo-Yemenis live in southern Yemen. Yemenite Jews once formed a sizeable minority, with a culture distinct from that of Jews in other Muslim countries. Most emigrated to Israel in the mid-20th century, following the Jewish exodus from Arab and Muslim countries and Operation Magic Carpet. There are also Iranian Yemenis.

Yemen is the only Arabian country that signed the international accords governing the protection of refugees. In 2007, Yemen had 124,600 refugees and asylum seekers. They were predominantly from Somalia, Iraq, Ethiopia, and Syria. Additionally, more than 334,000 Yemenis have been internally displaced by conflict. The Yemeni diaspora is largely concentrated in neighbouring Saudi Arabia, with the United Kingdom hosting a smaller population.

=== Languages ===
Modern Standard Arabic is the official language, while Yemeni Arabic is the vernacular, varying somewhat by region. In the far east and the island of Socotra, several Modern South Arabian languages are spoken. Yemeni Sign Language is used by the deaf community.

The South Semitic languages are native to Yemen. The largest South Semitic language spoken in Yemen is Mehri, with roughly 70,000 speakers. Soqotri, another South Semitic language, has 57,000 speakers, concentrated in Socotra. Yemen was home to the Old South Arabian languages, with only the Razihi language surviving.

=== Religion ===
Religion in Yemen
Sunni Islam	56.36%
Zaydi Islam	42.1%
Others	1.54%

Islam is the state religion. Religion in Yemen consists primarily of two Muslim sects. According to a UNHCR report, the Shia Zaydis make up about 45 percent of the population, Sunnis 53 percent and there are significant minorities of Ismailis and Twelvers. Sunnis are primarily Shafi'i but also include significant groups of Malikis and Hanbalis.

The Sunnis are the majority in the south and southeast, which are less populous. The Zaydis are the majority in the north and northwest, where the majority of the Yemeni population lives. The Ismailis are concentrated in urban centres, such as Sanaa and Ma'rib. Larger cities are more religiously diverse. According to Gallup International, Yemen has the highest share of religious people among Arab countries and the world.

About .05 percent of Yemenis adhere to Christianity, Judaism, Hinduism or have no religious affiliation. Yemen is number five on Open Doors' 2022 World Watch List, an annual ranking of the 50 countries where Christians face the most extreme persecution. Estimates of the number of Christians in Yemen range from 25,000 to 41,000. There are approximately 50 or fewer Jews left in Yemen. Some 200 Yemeni Jews were brought to Israel by the Jewish Agency around 2016. According to a 2020 estimate, as few as 26 Jews remain in Yemen. A 2022 United Nations report estimated that one Yemeni Jew remained. Reportedly, there are several crypto-Jews remaining in the country.

=== Education ===
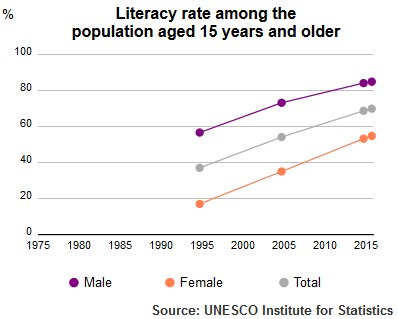
Literacy rate of the population aged 15 or older (1995–2015) by UNESCO Institute of Statistics

The adult literacy rate in 2010 was 64%. Although the government provides for universal, compulsory, free education for children ages six through 15, the U.S. Department of State reports that compulsory attendance is unenforced.

In 2003, the government developed the a plan in aiming to provide education to 95% of children between the ages of six and 14 years and to decrease the gender gap in education. In March 2008, the World Bank approved a seven-year project to improve gender equity and the quality and efficiency of secondary education, focusing on girls in rural areas. Following this, Yemen increased its education spending from 5% of GDP in 1995 to 10% in 2005.

According to the Webometrics Ranking of World Universities, the highest-ranking universities in the country are the Yemeni University of Science & Technology (6532nd worldwide), Al Ahgaff University (8930th) and Sanaa University (11043rd). Yemen was ranked 131st in the Global Innovation Index in 2021, down from 129th in 2019.

== Culture ==
=== Architecture ===
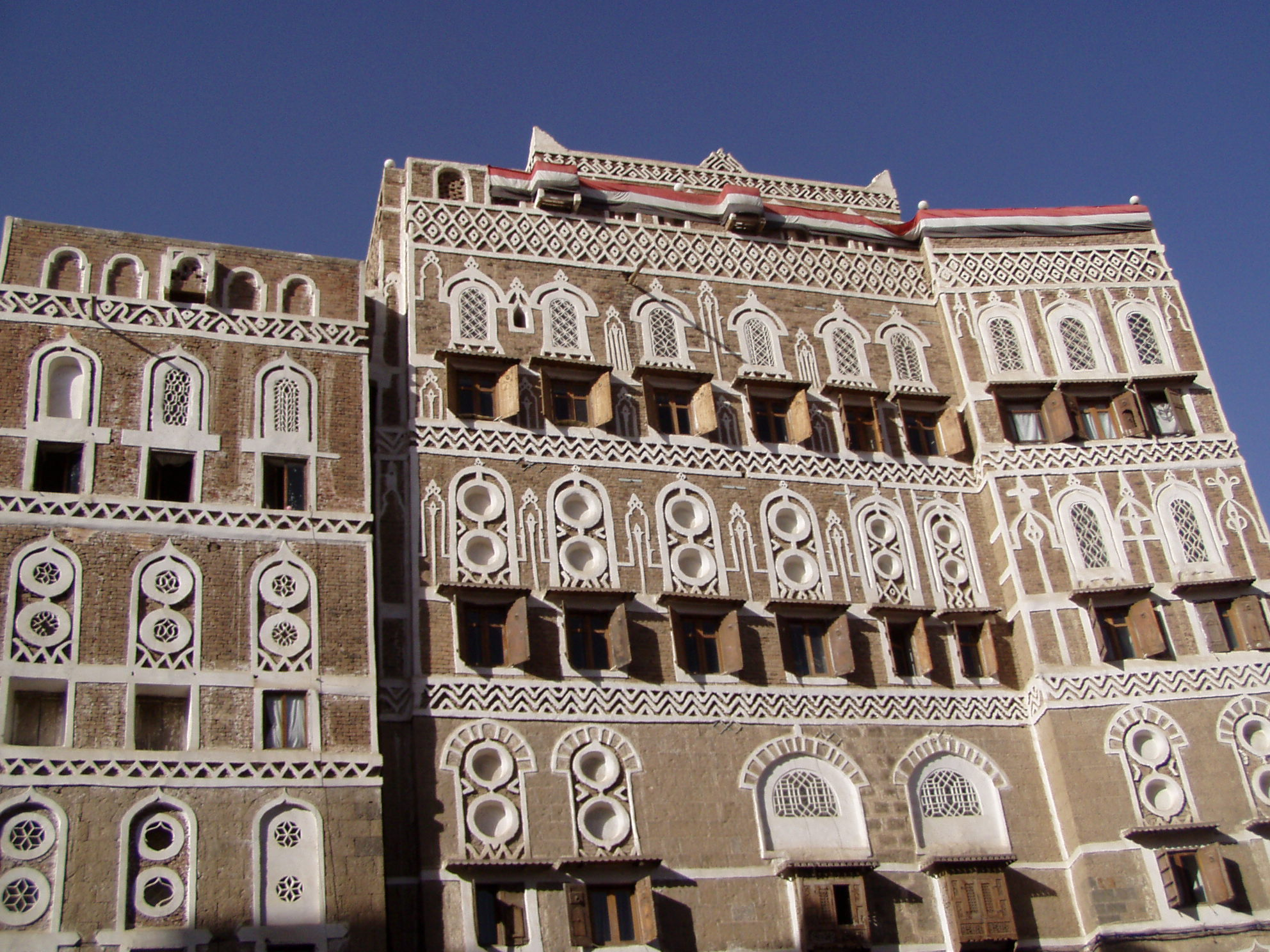
Example of traditional houses in the old city of Sanaa

Yemen is notable for its historic tower-houses, built on two or more floors. These houses vary in form and materials from region to region. They are typically built of mud (either rammed earth or sun-dried mud-brick), stone, or a combination of both, with timber used for roofs and floors. In some cases, as at Sanaa, the lower floors are built in heavier stone and the upper floors are built in lighter brick. Mud is sometimes mixed with straw and the walls are sometimes finished with lime. Coral stone is also used in coastal towns. Traditionally, the ground floor could be used for practical functions such as agriculture, the middle floors consisted of various multi-functional rooms, and the top floor often had a large reception room (mafraj) which enjoyed the best views.

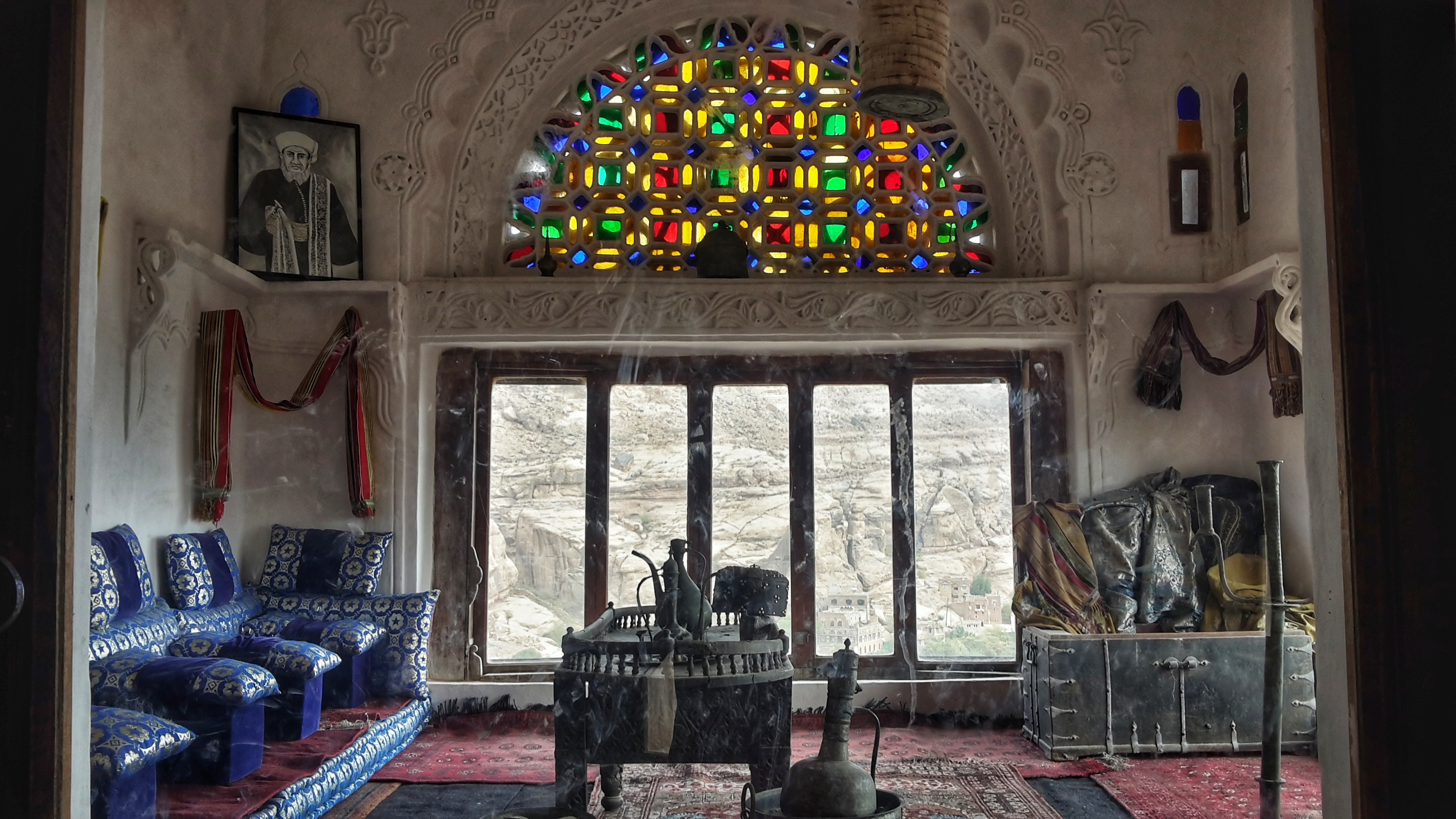
Room inside the Dar al-Hajar near Sanaa, with carved gypsum and coloured glass fanlight

Decoration of houses is often executed with gypsum, lime or some other plaster. At Sanaa, typical designs consist of bands of geometric motifs on the exterior created with protruding bricks that are whitewashed. Plasterwork is also found around the windows, and geometric or floral motifs can be used in coloured glass within the semicircular fanlights. This style can be seen also be seen at Dar al-Hajar, a palace built on a rocky outcrop in Wadi Zahr (15 kilometres north of Sanaa), dating to the 1930s, which features rich gypsum decoration and coloured glass fanlights.

Some villages and towns, such as Radda, were built around a fortified citadel (e.g. the Citadel of Rada'a), others were encircled by a high mud-brick wall (e.g. Shibam), and some were built so that the houses themselves formed an outer wall along an elevated position (e.g. Khawlan).

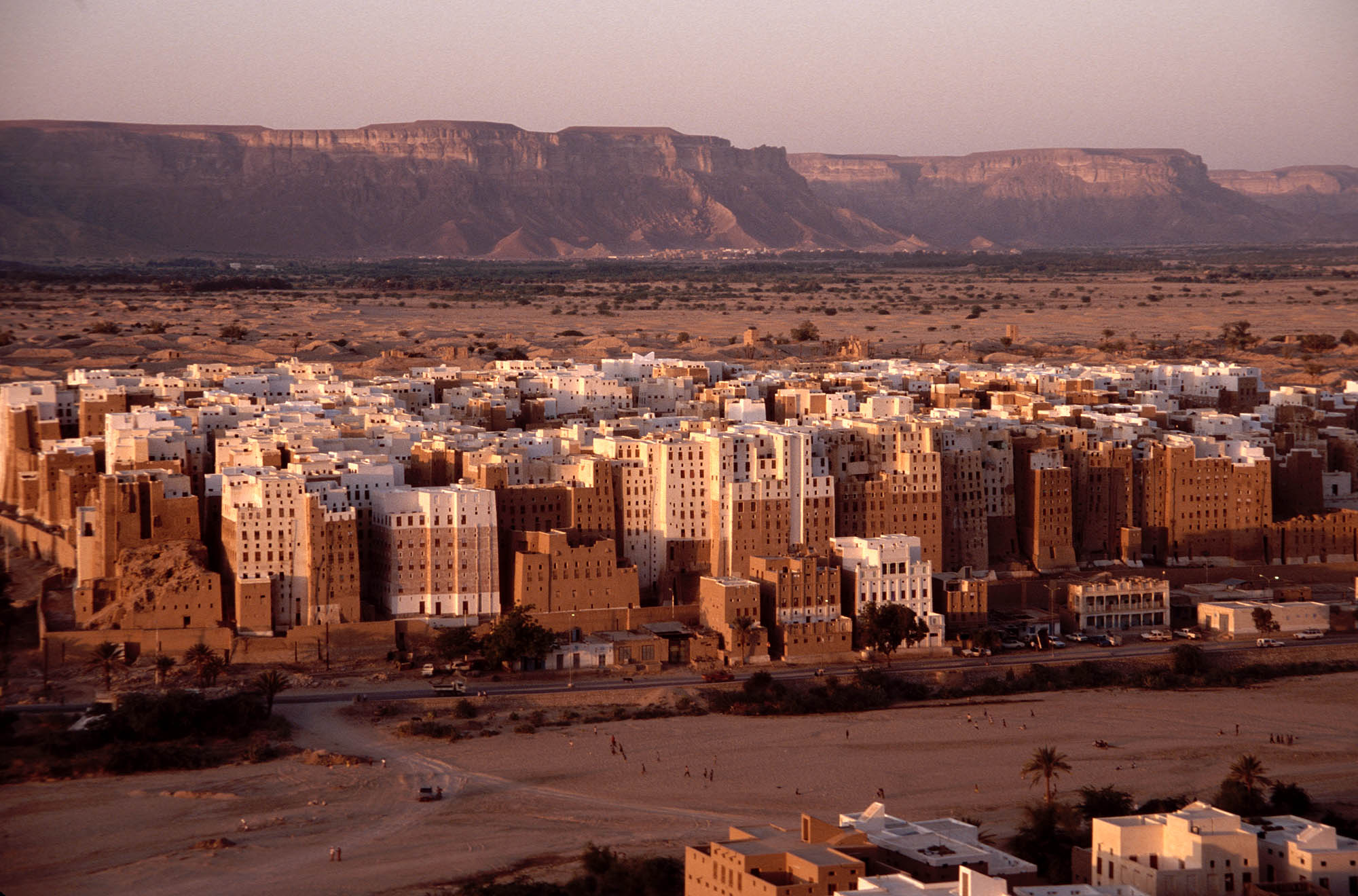
Shibam (in Hadramawt), an example of a historic fortified village with particularly tall tower-houses

While these structures are repaired and restored over time, this architectural style has remained generally unchanged for hundreds of years. The old city of Sanaa is a prominent example which preserves many of these houses. Since 1986 it is a UNESCO World Heritage Site, although its conservation is threatened by the ongoing Yemeni Civil War. The oldest house in the city is believed to one of stone and earth located in the Harat al-'Alami area, as its existence is documented as early as the 14th century.

=== Theatre ===
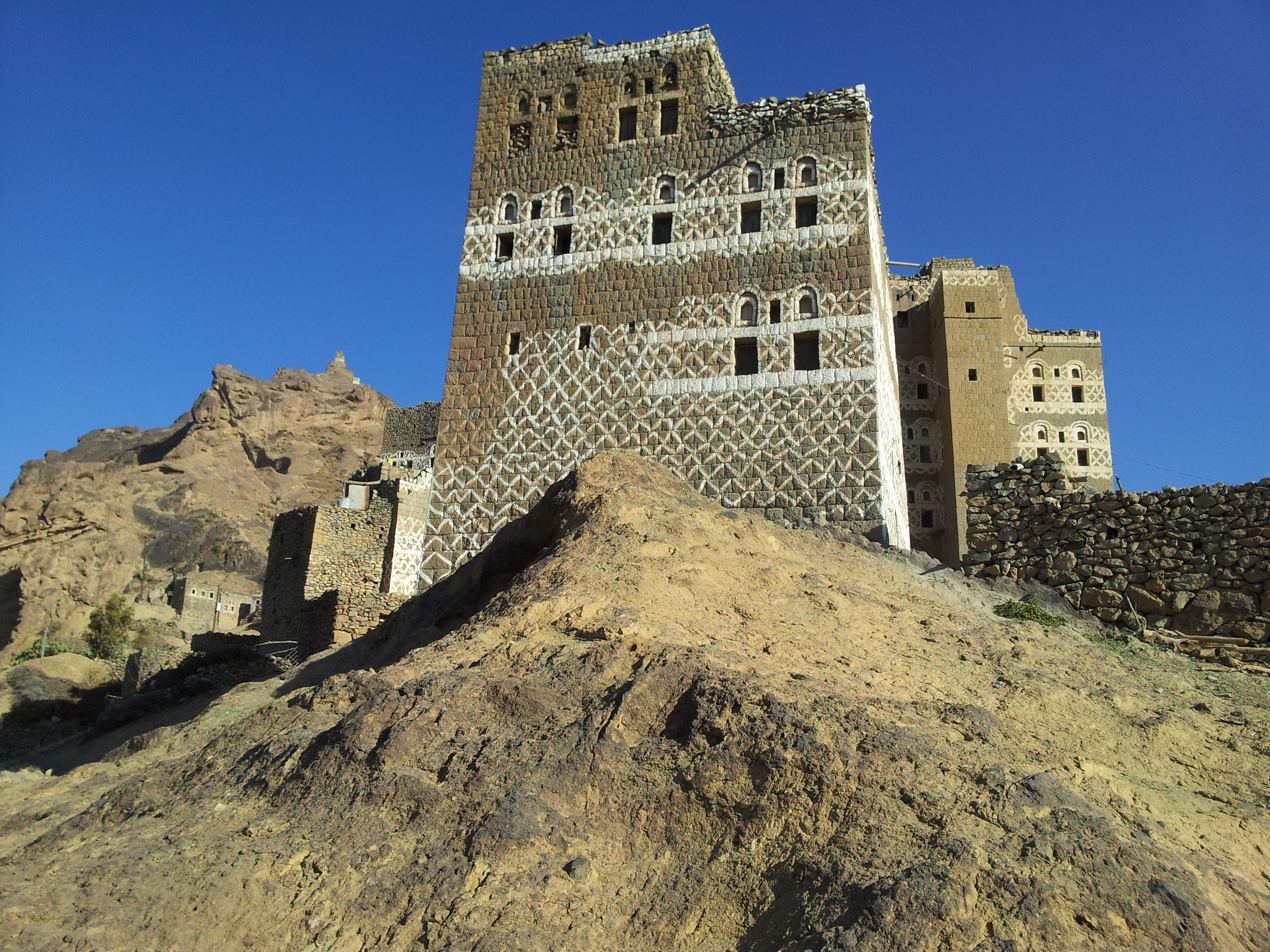
Typical house in Al Hajjarah

Yemeni theatre dates to the early 20th century. Both amateur and professional (government-sponsored) theatre troupes perform in the country's major urban centres. Many significant poets and authors, like Ali Ahmed Ba Kathir, Muhammad al-Sharafi, and Wajdi al-Ahdal, have written dramatic works; poems, novels, and short stories by Yemeni authors like Mohammad Abdul-Wali and Abdulaziz Al-Maqaleh have also been adapted for the stage.

There have been Yemeni productions of plays by Arab authors such as Tawfiq al-Hakim and Saadallah Wannous and by Western authors, including Shakespeare, Pirandello, Brecht, and Tennessee Williams. Historically speaking, Aden is the cradle of Yemeni theatre; in recent decades Sanaa has hosted numerous theatre festivals, often in conjunction with World Theatre Day.

=== Media ===
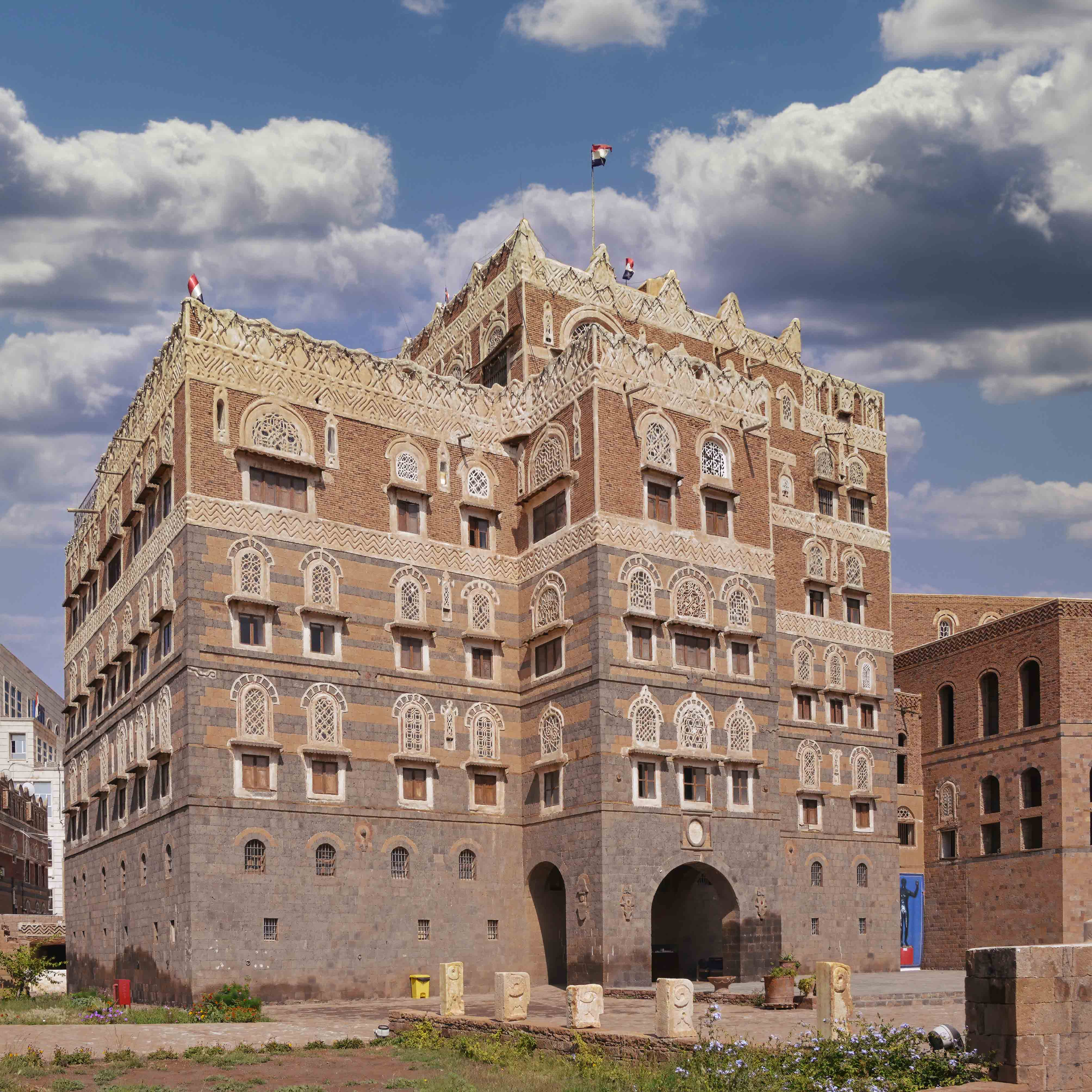
The National Museum of Yemen in Sanaa

Radio broadcasting in Yemen began in the 1940s. After unification in 1990, the government reformed its corporations and founded some additional radio stations that broadcast locally. However, it drew back after 1994, due to destroyed infrastructure resulting from the 1994 civil war.

Television is the most significant media platform. Given the low literacy rate in the country, television is the main source of news. There are six free-to-air channels currently headquartered in Yemen, of which four are state-owned. The Yemeni film industry is in its early stages; only eight Yemeni films have been released as of 2023.

=== Sport ===
Football is the most popular sport. The Yemen Football Association is a member of FIFA and AFC. The Yemeni national football team participates internationally. The country also hosts many football clubs. They compete in the national and international leagues.

Yemen's mountains provide many opportunities for outdoor sports, such as biking, rock climbing, trekking, hiking, and other more challenging sports, including mountain climbing. Mountain climbing and hiking tours to the Sarawat Mountains, including peaks of 3,000 m (9,800 ft) and above, particularly that of An-Nabi Shu'ayb, are seasonally organised by local and international alpine agencies. The coastal areas and Socotra provide many opportunities for water sports, such as surfing, bodyboarding, sailing, swimming, and scuba diving. Socotra is home to some of the best surfing destinations in the world.

Camel jumping is a traditional sport that is becoming increasingly popular among the Zaraniq tribe on the west coast. Camels are placed side to side and victory goes to the competitor who leaps, from a running start, over the most camels. Tribesmen (women may not compete) tuck their robes around their waists for freedom of movement while running and leaping.

Yemen's biggest sports event was hosting the 20th Arabian Gulf Cup in Aden and Abyan in 2010. Yemen was defeated in the first three matches of the tournament.

== See also ==
- List of Yemen-related topics
- Outline of Yemen

== Sources ==
- Arbach, Mounir; Rossi, Irene (2022). The city-states of the Jawf at the dawn of Ancient South Arabian history (8th–6th centuries BCE). L'Erma Di Bretschneider.
- Bloom, Jonathan M.; Blair, Sheila (2009). The Grove Encyclopedia of Islamic Art & Architecture. Oxford University Press. ISBN 978-0-19-530991-1. Archived from the original on 27 April 2025.
