= Corruption in Yemen =

Corruption in Yemen is a highly serious problem. Yemen ranked 177th out of 182 countries in the 2025 Corruption Perceptions Index, where the country ranked first is perceived to have the most honest public sector. It is the most corrupt country in the Arabian Peninsula. It is also the poorest country in the Middle East, "with an exceptionally high birth rate, acute rates of child malnutrition and rapidly dwindling reserves of oil and water." In Yemen, according to Chatham House, "corruption, poverty and inequality are systemic"; in the words of the Carnegie Endowment for International Peace, corrupt activity is "so entrenched and pervasive" that many citizens feel powerless.

Absent any "system of control and accountability," corruption is now present throughout the public and private spheres, so much so that in the words of the World Bank, "[c]orruption and patronage networks are running the country's public affairs." This ubiquitous corruption has resulted in weak government and "corrupt power blocs that control public resources." As a consequence of civil service corruption, there are large numbers of so-called ghost workers. Corruption in the energy, communications, and health and education sectors has resulted in inadequate service or no service at all.

Jane Marriott, Britain's Ambassador to Yemen, stated in December 2013 that corruption in Yemen was so pervasive that it was credibly undermining the security and economy of the nation. She also noted that institutionalized corruption of such a grand scale discourages development and innovation.

== Background ==
In the mid-1990s, corruption allegedly became "rampant" in Yemen. The presidency of Ali Abdullah Saleh, who served from 1990 to 2012, was said to be marked by the admixture of government, military, and corporate interests as well as by extensive nepotism and self-enrichment. Members of Saleh's Sanhan clan established power bases in the military, with Saleh's brother Mohammed Abdullah Saleh running the Central Security Forces (CSF). On Mohammed Abdullah Selah's death in 2001, his son Yahya Mohamed Abdullah Saleh took control of the CSF. Meanwhile, Yahya's brothers Tarik and Ammar ran the Presidential Guard and the National Security Bureau (NSB) respectively. Military aid from the US and other Western countries ended up enhancing the personal wealth of these members of the Saleh family and also enhancing their "ability to act as a source of patronage."

In 2008, business people with close ties to Ahmed Saleh, the son of President Saleh, reportedly used World Bank funds to found Shibam Holding Company, a government-backed property developer. This new firm took control of a great deal of government land and, later, of the General Investment Authority (GIA).

Beginning in 2004, another clan, the Houthis, fought a six-year war against Saleh, whom they accused of corruption and criticized for sundry other reasons, including his U.S. and Saudi ties and his failure to support economic development in their region. This struggle gradually turned into a conflict between Ahmed Saleh's Republican Guard and Ali Mohsin's First Armoured Division, and it escalated in 2009 with a Saudi troop deployment. In 2010, international pressure led to a ceasefire.

Also in 2010, the CEIP stated that Yemen was at greater systemic risk of collapsing from corruption, than by being toppled by Al-Qaeda.

Young Yemenis' anger over "political and economic exclusion" led to a 2011 popular uprising and increased the risk of civil war. In response, the U.S., U.K., and Saudi Arabia pushed for a transfer of power that would remove Saleh but leave the political elites essentially intact. In 2012, then, with the elite's power crippled by its "increasingly obvious corruption," Ali Abdullah Saleh resigned from the presidency in exchange for a guarantee of immunity from prosecution and a promise that he could stay in the country.

This resignation effectively averted civil war. Replacing Saleh as president was his deputy, Abdu Rabbu Mansour Hadi. The negotiated handover of power was widely viewed as "a regional success story" that could set Yemen on a "path towards a secure, prosperous future." As IRIN News put it, these developments were widely considered a step forward for good governance advocates, who had struggled to make reforms for years.

Over two years later, however, anti-corruption activists were still embattled with an entrenched culture of corruption that discourages honesty. A representative of a local human rights foundation said that one patronage system had been dismantled, only to begin all new corruption systems. It was noted that bribery under Saleh was "more standardized" and that the breakdown of central authority has caused groups to demand inconsistent bribe amounts.

In a survey of Yemenis taken in 2013, 42% believed corruption was up since 2011. The World Bank agreed that by 2014 there had not been "any noticeable improvement in anti-corruption efforts" in Yemen, and that in fact, corruption in the country was "still rampant and growing."

When Saleh's successor, Abd Rabbuh Mansour Hadi, was toppled in a coup in 2015, Saleh was accused of playing a role in it.

Yemen is a chronically poor performer on Transparency International's annual Corruption Perceptions Index. Since the current calculation of the Index was introduced in 2012, Yemen has fallen from its highest score that year of 23 (on a scale from 0, "highly corrupt", to 100, "very clean") to its lowest score of 13 in 2024 and 2025. When ranked by score in 2025, Yemen ranked 177th among the 182 countries in the Index, where the country ranked first is perceived to have the most honest public sector. For comparison with regional scores, the highest score among Middle Eastern and North African countries (Note: Algeria, Bahrain, Egypt, Iran, Iraq, Israel, Jordan, Kuwait, Lebanon, Libya, Morocco, Oman, Qatar, Saudi Arabia, Syria, Tunisia, United Arab Emirates, and Yemen) was 69, the average was 39 and the worst was 13. For comparison with worldwide scores, the best score was 89 (ranked 1), the average was 42, and the worst was 9 (ranked 181 in a two-way tie).

== Government ==
=== Nepotism ===
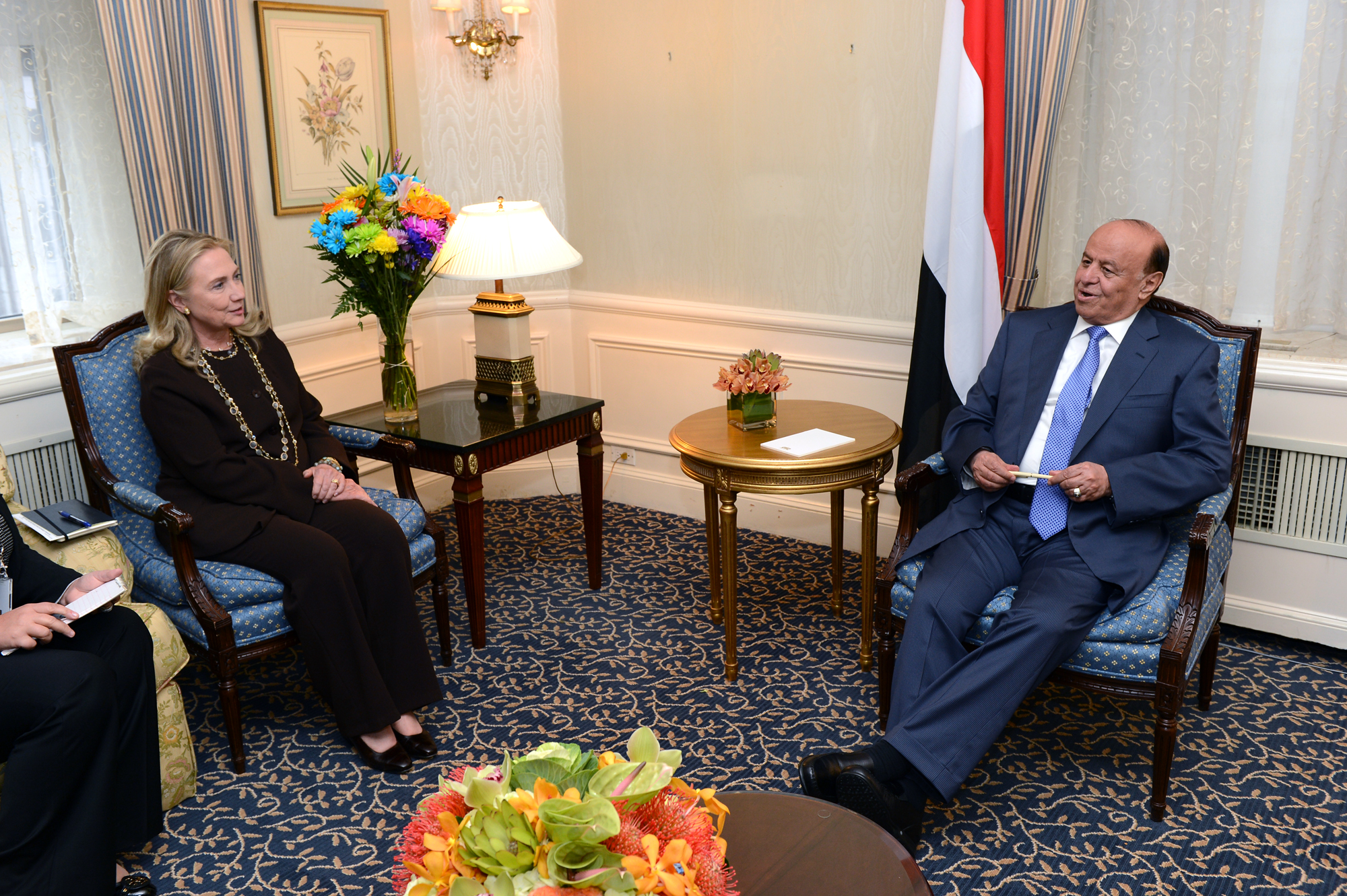
Yemeni President Hadi with Secretary Clinton

Under Saleh, power was alleged to be distributed to the president's relatives and members of his clan, who came to dominate the military, tribes, government, and economy.

A 2013 report argued that Saleh utilized his massive patronage network to garner cooperation between the nation's economic, military, and tribal elites. This system operated to the benefit of the Yemeni elite at the expense of the poor majority. The report noted that the elite rarely keep their looted wealth within the nation, further bearing down on Yemen's populace.

A UN panel told the Security Council in February 2015 that Saleh was thought to have accumulated up to $60 billion through corruption during his tenure. He had carried out these activities in collaboration with friends, family, and associates, including at least five prominent businessmen, and his stolen assets had reportedly been "hidden in at least twenty countries with the help of business associates and front companies." An estate of $60 billion would make Saleh the fifth richest man in the world.

Today, despite the changes that have taken place, Yemen's economy is criticized as still being dominated by a tiny elite consisting of military, tribal, political, and business leaders, with around ten families and groups of business associates controlling over 80% of the country's imports, manufacturing, processing, banking, telecommunications, and goods transport. Yemen's future, stated in a 2013 report by Chatham House, will be determined by "whether its elite remains more concerned by the threats posed by rival factions within the elite, or prioritizes its response to popular anger arising from the failure to allocate resources more widely."

The Carnegie Endowment for International Peace (CEIP) has pointed out that a custom known as wasta', or favoritism, ensures that favors or job appointments are routinely given to persons who have relatives in positions of power or who pay sufficient bribes to public officials.

According to the World Food Programme, "over 10 million Yemenis – 46 per cent of the population – do not have enough to eat," a problem that is worsened by "the self-enriching behaviour of the country's elites, who are depleting Yemen's resources, sending illicitly earned and untaxed profits abroad, and often actively resisting much-needed structural reforms." Nepotism, according to IRIN News, is routinely present in public aid projects, and its presence is more often a hindrance.

=== Election fraud ===
Elections have been characterized by Freedom House as "vote buying, the partisanship of public officials and the military, and exploitation of state control over key media platforms." According to Chatham House, a national debate about corruption was occasioned by the 2006 election campaign, but this debate did not lead to any systemic changes. Also, "parliamentary elections have been repeatedly postponed," with the 2009 elections put off to 2011 and then put off again.

=== Military ===
According to Chatham House, corruption is reportedly widespread in the Yemeni military, a state of affairs partially caused by the virtual absence of civilian oversight. In 2013, the Transparency International Government Defence Anti-Corruption Index ranked Yemen's defense establishments as one of the world's most corrupt. Since at least 2010, the army has consisted of "a series of factional alliances that more resembled a collection of feudal warlords than a modern, centrally managed military," because "Saleh was wary of creating a centralized military capable of mounting a coup."

A "parastatal" entity called YECO, which procures military equipment and is run by active-duty officers, owns a great deal of land and "various parastatal enterprises," mostly in what used to be South Yemen, according to Chatham House. YECO is active in various sectors, including real estate, tourism, construction, oil and gas, pharmaceuticals, transport and agriculture. The military is permitted to seize land for its own use, and can do so either directly or via YECO. It has been suggested that this land is often given to officers or sold to developers for private profit. Both Saleh and Ali Mohsin had "extensive patronage networks inside YECO."

=== Bribery and petty corruption ===
Bribes have been characterized as not only widespread but "necessary" in Yemen, given the poor economic conditions that compel subject police and other civil servants to try to live on salaries that "barely meet subsistence levels." As Philippe Le Billon of the University of British Columbia has put it, petty corruption of this sort is often the only way civil servants can make ends meet.

In Yemen, a person who is not entitled to a passport can easily secure one in exchange for a bribe. This causes trouble for Yemenis who have legitimate passports and who wish to work in other Gulf countries. These Yemenis' resultant inability to get jobs abroad limits remittances and thus weakens the Yemeni economy.

== Business ==
=== Land ===
The process by which land is sold and registered is reportedly murky and lacking in transparency, and these systematic weaknesses provide opportunities for widespread corruption.

=== Oil ===
During the Saleh era, the oil and gas industry was supposedly "the main source of export revenue and government finance." Saleh personally approved "all major deals and production-sharing agreements" with foreign oil firms. The government-owned Yemen Oil and Gas Corporation "dominated the import and distribution of petroleum products, and delegated monopoly privileges to a major operator, Tawfiq Abdulraheem ," who was close to Saleh. Corruption in this sector principally involved the awarding of service contracts and import/export deals. In addition, "Saleh allocated state-subsidized fuel products on a quota basis to his relatives and political allies, who were free to charge a substantial mark-up to wholesale domestic buyers, or trade their allocated quota overseas at international market prices." Saleh also allowed certain businessmen "to claim subsidies on non-existent fuel imports, on the basis of falsified import documents." This practice cost the national treasury dearly, although YECO profited greatly from it. "Oil-related corruption was also endemic in the military, with officers benefiting directly from fuel allocated to their units and using military transport infrastructure to move it both within Yemen and to foreign markets."

The Wall Street Journal reported in 2010 that the US Justice Department was investigating Schlumberger, an oil firm, for corruption connected to its activities in Yemen. In 2002, Schlumberger had bid on a contract with state-run PEPA via a local agent, Zonic Investments, run by Tawfiq Saleh Abdullah Saleh, and paid a "signing bonus" of $500,000 to an offshore subsidiary of Zonic in addition to disbursing an additional $1.38 million to PEPA. Also, two PEPA officials rented cars to Schlumberger at artificially high prices, and Dhakwan Petroleum and Mineral Services, owned by Ali Mohsin, which imported and exported equipment for Schlumberg, received $280,000 for processing paperwork. The Journal stated that when Schlumberger sought to end its arrangement with Dhakwan, "it became impossible for it to import equipment into Yemen."

Fuel subsidies in Yemen, according to the IMF, open substantial opportunities for corruption. These subsidies chiefly benefit rich Yemenis, encourage excess consumption, and provide opportunities for smuggling.

=== Medicine ===
At a typical hospital, according to IRIN News, doctors and other staff are, according to one employee, mostly hired on the basis of connections to the local sheikh, without regard to qualifications. Many of those who are hired are either "ghost workers" – i.e., do not exist – or do not actually show up for work. The latter receive their own paychecks, while the sheikh takes those for the "ghost workers." Medical funding rarely makes it past the employees dividing it between themselves.

Another medical professional described a similar situation in a hospital in Sanaa, where a fellow aid worker paid graft on a daily basis in cooperation with the Yemeni military officer in charge of the facility. The corrupt activity at this hospital involved over-billing an aid agency. IRIN News's interviewee chose not to report the corruption because he feared that doing so could thwart investors, which would cause the hospital to fall apart. Colleagues agreed that whistleblowing in this case would likely be pointless, given the military's impunity. Moreover, these medical professionals risked losing their jobs, or worse, for defying authority.

=== Banking ===
Yemen's central bank has raised much of its capital from private banks "by selling treasury bills and bonds into the domestic market at generous interest rates." This resulted, allegedly, in excellent profits for elite businessmen who held most of the government's debt but deterred other businesspersons from applying for loans.

== Economic growth ==
A December 2014 World Bank report stated that corruption is a continued drain on the economy of Yemen. Corruption by influential individuals who strong-arm investors, forcing them to pay for protection, negatively affects Yemen's business climate, according to the report, causing investor flight that results in fewer job opportunities and hesitation on the part of Yemeni businessmen abroad to invest in their own country.

A September 2010 report on Yemeni corruption by the Carnegie Endowment for International Peace (CEIP) described corruption as the chief source of Yemen's stagnation. Fighting corruption, stated the report, must be central to stabilization and development. According to CEIP, corruption was preventing the expansion of small businessess owing to the arbitrary corruption they faced at the hands of police and government officials. This, in turn, keeps unemployment high, and discourages investment.

A 2010 documentary film by the Center for International Private Enterprise, Destructive Beast, exposed the cost of corruption, in terms of economic and social impact, in Yemen.

=== Foreign aid ===
"Yemen's reputation for corruption," IRIN News has maintained, is a chief factor why Yemen received limited aid. IRIN stated that in 2006, a London group that had granted $4.7 billion in aid to Yemen saw only about 10 percent of that funding pass through corruption obstacles and contribute to aid.

In 2011, the Norwegian Agency for Development Cooperation (NORAD) found that current efforts to reduce corruption the foreign aid to Yemen rely too much on internationally driven "technical-legal" processes that lack sufficient local consent. Also, current anti-corruption approaches tend to be a legal framework, which has little impact on the localized groups that lack the rule of law.

== Anti-corruption activities ==
According to the World Bank, the regulatory bodies monitoring corruption in Yemen are weak. The parliament, instead of acting against corruption, is said to have acted as an enabler of government opacity because it routinely defends the government. However, some of the laws Yemen has proceeded with have been called a "good start."

The Supreme National Authority for Combating Corruption (SNACC), however, has "not...fully realized" its officially designated role. Authorities have slowed down their investigative procedures or impeded the referral of cases to authorities that are supposed to take action on them. Also, the legal system lacks a framework for special cases. Out of 2400 corruption complaints filed from 2007 to 2014, only 71 were heard in court. In 2013, 100 cases of corruption were referred to the SNACC for prosecution, but by the end of that year no verdicts had been forthcoming.

In 2013, President Hadi dismissed several highly placed officials for corruption. Also, the Central Organization for Control and Auditing has prosecuted corrupt officials and recuperated embezzled funds. Freedom House has credited the Yemeni government with trying to fight corruption, but has also pointed out that the country has no conflict of interest enforcement and that bodies responsible for auditing and investigation are not independent of the executive branch.

Transparency International's 2005 Global Corruption Report noted donors in Yemen rarely denounce corruption for fear of politically-motivated reprisals.

A campaign by Transparency International's Yemen chapter (YTTI), addressed corruption in the security sector, particularly bribery and extortion by police officers and soldiers. In 2012, police were alleged to have threatened YTTI members violently and may have even resorted to force. Also, the group's project coordinator was shot by an unidentified shooter after delivering a speech on corruption, seriously injuring him.

The UK's Department for International Development (DFID) has backed Yemenis who demand greater government accountability and transparency. In 2013, the then British Minister of State for International Development, Alan Duncan MP, told journalists that Yemen requires better leadership in combatting corruption at every level.

The US State Department has expressed concern about the lack of laws protecting Yemeni government employees who report corruption. According to the Department's 2013 Human Rights Report on Yemen, NGO's reported several instances of reprisals for employees reporting corruption. The same report describes how Yemen's Ministry of Social and Labor Affairs unfairly put up barriers to human rights-related groups, whereas unrelated groups experienced few difficulties.

=== National Dialogue ===
Hamid al-Ahmar, Sheikh Abdullah's son, sponsored the National Dialogue Conference (NDC), a "grassroots consultation exercise," beginning in 2009. Its goal was "to draw up a national 'salvation plan' for Yemen." At the same time, civil society activists took up "a more aggressive stance, staging regular sit-ins in front of the parliament building." One of those activists, Tawwakul Karman, went on to share the 2011 Nobel Peace Prize. The Conference, which brought together "a wide range of participants," allowed people to "air their grievances publicly" but did not enable them to "significantly challenge the informal networks of power that have proved remarkably resilient to change in the past." NDC participants recognized that the nation's wealth had been looted by a privileged elite. The Good Governance Working Group, whose task was to develop an approach to fighting corruption, called for a law protecting journalists, whistleblowers, and witnesses.

== See also ==
- International Anti-Corruption Academy
- Group of States Against Corruption
- International Anti-Corruption Day
- ISO 37001 Anti-bribery management systems
- United Nations Convention against Corruption
- OECD Anti-Bribery Convention
- Transparency International
