= Al-Hudaydah offensive =

Offensive of the Yemeni Civil War

Al Hudaydah offensive
- Part of the Yemeni Civil War (2014–present) and the Saudi Arabian-led intervention in Yemen
- Coalition's Hudaydah offensive within southwestern-Yemen
Date	Main Phase: 6 December 2017 – 27 November 2018 (11 months and 3 weeks); UN brokered Cease fire Restart of Hostilities: 13 November 2021 – 2 April 2022 (4 months, 2 weeks and 6 days)
Location	Al Hudaydah Governorate, Yemen 14°48′08″N 42°57′04″E
Result	UN Ceasefire and Coalition Withdrawal: Coalition forces capture Al Khawkhah, Hays, and At Tuhayta; UN brokered cease fire in Al Hudaydah in 2018; Hadi government forces and allies leave Eastern Al Hudaydah in 2021, before eventually withdrawing from Al Hudaydah Governorate; Another UN-brokered ceasefire takes effect on 2 April 2022

Belligerents
(Yemen) Cabinet of Yemen: National Resistance; Tihamah Resistance; Giants Brigades; Saudi Arabia; United Arab Emirates; Southern Movement	(Yemen) Supreme Political Council: Houthis; Supported by: Hezbollah (alleged)

Commanders and leaders
(Yemen) Tareq Saleh (Saudi Arabia) Ahmad al-Kokpani (Saudi Arabia) Hassan Taher (Saudi Arabia) Abdulrahman Hajri (Saudi Arabia) Haitham Kassem (Saudi Arabia) Nabil Amr (WIA) (Saudi Arabia) Abu Zaraa Al-Mahramy (United Arab Emirates) Abdulsalam Al Shehi (South Yemen) Raed Al-Habhy Al-Yafeiy (South Yemen) Hamdy Shokry Al-Sobaihy (South Yemen) Abd Al-Rahman Al-Lajy (South Yemen) Nizar Al-Wageeh (South Yemen) Abu Haroun Al-Yafeiy (Yemen) Wissam Saleh (South Yemen) Hassan Dobla (Yemen) Ibrahim Abado; Mohammed Al Himyari (South Yemen) Aseel Al Sakladi; Mohammed Omar Moamen; Rafeeq Domah; Ibrahim Al Theeb; Ahmed Kawkabani; Saddam Al-Qadi; Nabil Al Suheily (Yemen) Naser Al Redhami Casualties: (Saudi Arabia) Gen. Abdul Hamid Al-Yahari †; (Saudi Arabia) Asil Faisal Modara †; (South Yemen) Ali Fadhel al-Hayish †; (Yemen) Abdullah Jalmud †; Osama Muhraki †	Mohammed Ali al-Houthi; Yusuf al-Madani; Mansour Ahmed Hamoud Jahaf al-Makeni; Abu Ali al-Hakim; Mohammed Al-Amati; Latman Sharaf Casualties: Saleh al-Sammad †; Yasser al-Ahmar †; Ali Muhammad Sulaiman Halsi †; Hameed Qasim Heikal †; Abu Malak †; Mohammed al-Dahn †; Maqbool al-Jarb Abuqhatan †; Abu Jibril Ali Mahmoud al-Shahari †; Abu Thabit †; Diaa Abdul-Salam Jahaf †; Khalid Mahdali †; Yahya Sharaf al-Din †; Ibrahim Abado (surrendered); Abed Abdullah Hamza †; Abu Talib †; Thabet Muhiuddin (POW); Omar al-Ansi (executed); Yunus Ibrahim Amer †; Sharaf Abdullah Al-Makeni Abu Mohammed †; Ahmed bin Ahmed al-Washli †

Units involved
Republican Guard Saudi Arabian Armed Forces: Saudi Arabian Army; Royal Saudi Navy; Royal Saudi Air Force Popular resistance; (South Yemen) Southern Movement; Southern Resistance; Southern Giants brigades	Houthis

Strength
25,000 (Saudi Arabia) 20,000; 5,000	30,000–35,000

Casualties and losses
350 killed (per Coalition, by 11 June 2018); 4 Emirati soldiers killed 1,323 killed and wounded (per Houthis, by 24 June)	250 killed, 143 captured (per Coalition, by 11 June 2018)
- Location within Yemen

Al Hudaydah offensive, also called Western Coast Offensive (Arabic: جبهة الساحل الغربي), describes the offensive launched in December 2017 by pro-government forces against the Houthis in Al Hudaydah Governorate as part of Yemen's 2015 civil war. By December 2018, the pro-government forces had captured the towns of Al Khawkhah, Hays, At Tuhayta, and brokered a ceasefire in Al Hudaydah City. In November 2021, a coalition withdrawal led the Houthi forces to break the siege of Al Hudaydah and recapture At Tuhayta.

== Course of events ==
=== Capturing Khawkha ===
Pro-Hadi government troops entered Al Hudaydah Governorate on the night of 6–7 December, and drove Houthi fighters from the town of Al Khawkhah. The attacking force reportedly included Emirati tanks, Southern Movement fighters, Tihamah Resistance fighters and loyalists of the late President Ali Abdullah Saleh, who had been killed by the Houthis earlier in the month. During the battle, at least four fighters from the anti-Houthi coalition were killed, and more than 70 Houthis were killed, and more than 30 were captured. One of the killed in the anti-Houthi coalition, was Southern Movement General Abdul Hamid Al-Yahari.

=== Hays clashes, and Khawkhah infiltrations ===
On 10 December, pro-government sources claimed that the Houthis were collapsing before the advancing forces, and had lost control of the district of Hays, alongside part of At Tuhayat. On December 11–12, Houthi commander Mansour Ahmed Hamoud Jahaf al-Makeni led a force of 15 units to reinforce the Houthis that were still fighting in Hays, but his group was caught in a surprise attack by Apache helicopters and anti-Houthi forces. His entire line was eliminated, and more than 53 of his fighters were killed, including commanders Ali Muhammad Sulaiman Halsi, Abu Malak, Hameed Qasim Heikal, and Mohammed al-Dahn. On the following day, some 8 Houthis were killed, including commander Maqbool al-Jarb Abuqhatan in raids in Houthi controlled frontlines. During these battles, it was estimated that about 100 Tihamah resistance fighters were killed and 200 were wounded. As for the Southern Movement, the group lost hundred of fighters and 70 Vehicles. Houthis on the other hand, brought more than 90 bodies of their fighters in Sana'a from the Hodeidah front, thus, at least 90 Houthis were killed during the battles. On December 14, Houthi forces attempted to infiltrate the Al Khawkhah district, but were repelled by Hadi soldiers. On the same day, 18 Houthis were killed by Saudi bombardment in their positions in Houthi-controlled areas in Hodeidah. On December 15, Houthis again tried to reinforce their positions south of Hays, but they were pushed back after coalition bombardments killed 11 and injured dozens. On the same day, coalition aircraft bombed Houthi positions in Al Mansuriyah district, killing 22 and wounding dozens of other militiamen. Also, coalition bombed Houthi position in Surat al-Jarrah, Zubaid, Hays, Dahrami and al-Tahita, killing 28 and wounding 17. On 17 December, coalition bombardments in Hodeidah, left 25 Houthis killed. Another 7 were killed in a checkpoint in Hodeidah airport. On the same day, a Houthi commander close to Houthi supreme commander Abdul-Malik Badreddin al-Houthi, Abu Jibril Ali Mahmoud al-Shahari, was killed in Kwahwkhah during a firefight with Southern resistance fighters. 26 Houthis were killed and 14 were wounded during airstrikes in At Tuhayat district and Al Hawak district. On December 18, 7 Hadi soldiers were killed and three wounded when their vehicle hit a Houthi land mine in Khawkhah. On the same day, Hadi coalition claimed that 21 Houthis were killed and 17 wounded during clashes across Hodeida. On December 22, Hadi official claimed that Yusuf al-Madani, Hussein al-Houthi's brother in law, and Houthi general of Fifth military region, was killed. Houthi official said that the claim was false, as they broadcast a video of Yusuf al-Madani, in which he claimed that he is alive, and that the one killed was Abu Jibril. On December 26, 14 civilians from the same family were killed by a coalition bombing in a farm in Houthi controlled parts of Hodeidah. On December 27, the Houthi commander, general of 135th brigade, Yasser al-Ahmar, was killed by bombardments in Hodeidah. On the same day, the coalition claimed that more than 45 Houthi fighters were killed, including their commander, Abu Thabit.

=== Besieging Khawkhah ===
On December 29, Houthis reportedly outmaneuvered coalition forces in Khawkhah, besieging them inside the city. Houthi fighters called the pro-Hadi coalition fighters to surrender. 50 coalition fighter were killed and wounded. One of the dead was Tihama commander Osama Muhraki. After the attack, the besieged launched a counteroffensive, breaking the siege, killing 72 Houthis. 10 coalition fighters were also killed, including a commander of Southern Giants, Ali Fadhel al-Hayish. From the Houthi side, their commanders, Diaa Abdul-Salam Jahaf, and Khalid Mahdali were also killed. 7 Houthis were also captured. On December 30, 25 Houthis were killed by coalition airstrikes in Al Garrahi district. Commander Yahya Sharaf al-Din was among the killed. Houthis who managed to infiltrate Khawkhah, were holing themself and were hiding in farms and rural areas, fearing coalition bombardment. On January 1, about 30 people were killed, both Houthis and civilians, when a coalition bombing took place in a fuel store.

=== Coalition offensive in Hays and cutting the supply lines ===
On 2 January, coalition forces clashed with Houthi in Wadi Zami area south of the center of Hays and captured many farms and villages. The Houthis then fled to Hays.

On 3 January, coalition forces cut the supply lines of the Houthis to the front of Taiz during fighting in Hays. 7 Houthis killed and four wounded in the clash.

On 4 January, 36 Houthis were killed and more than 60 wounded during an offensive of coalition forces in Houthi held parts of Hays district.

On 5 January, Houthi commander Ibrahim Abado, and 50 of his fighters, surrendered to the coalition. On the same day, Abu Ali al-Hakim, was sent by the Houthi leader to West coast to reinforce the command structure.

On 6 January, coalition forces under command of former Houthi commander Ibrahim Adado and southerner leader Hassan Dobla attacked Houthi forces in Hays. The fighting resulted to deaths and injuries in both sides. From the coalition side, Pro-Hadi forces commander of the engineering battalion Abdullah Jalmud and Southern Resistance commander Asil Faisal Modara were killed in battle. For the Hoithi side, 26 died. Saudi coalition claimed that Hezbollah was aiding Houthis on the field in Hodeidah.

On 6–9 January, coalition forces aided by UAE boosted their fighters in the road of the cut Houthi supply lines, to ensure they remain cut, and pushed further in the Houthi parts of Hays. During the fighting, and bombardments of the coalition, the coalition claimed that about 30 Houthi soldiers were killed.

By 13 January, coalition forces had managed to encircle Hays, and they were preparing for a full-scale assault. On 16 January, coalition claimed that 10 Houthis were killed in Hays by airstrikes.

On 20 January, clashes occurred on the outskirts of Hays, and as of 28 January, the Houthis were in control of the town, having planted mines and blown up a bridge in order to stall the government's ongoing offensive.

On 22 January, the coalition managed to get control of some points and villages in the outskirts of Hays after fighting with the Houthi. On January 26, coalition bombardment in Houthi reinforcements in Hays, left 20 dead. On the same day, the coalition progressed further in the district, launching an offensive from the south.

On 5 February, Tihama resistance, southern Giants brigades, and Hadi loyals commanded by Tihama leader Abdulrahman Hajri, southern leader Abu Zaraa Al-Mahramy, and Hadi loyalist Brigadier General Ahmad al-Kokpani entered Hays district, with the fall of the town being confirmed the following day. The three commanders and their forces launched a surprise attack, from both west and south, killing and wounding 20 Houthis in the progress, 5 coalition fighters also died or were wounded.

On the following day, the coalition cut the road leading to Al Garrahi district, and started to clear the Houthi pockets inside Hays. During the fighting, Houthi commander Abed Abdullah Hamza was killed in battle. At least thirty Houthis and eight loyalists were reportedly killed in the battle, in which the government was supported by heavy coalition airstrikes.

On 7 February, 4 civilians were killed and 11 were wounded when a Houthi rocked crashed in Hays. On the same day, coalition bombed Houthi reinforcements under command of Abu Talib, killing 35 of them, including the commander. On February 9, Southern Movement captured a Houthi recruiter in Hays, named Thabet Muhiuddin.

=== Attack in Al Garrahi ===
The UNHRC announced on the 9 February that, since the beginning of December, 61,000 people had been displaced from the frontline governorates of Taiz and Al Hudaydah, representing 71 percent of all people displaced within Yemen during that time period. The coalition launched an attack in Al Garrahi district. Southern Giants, Tihama resistance, and Hadi loyals, backed by UAE Apache helicopters, attacked Houthi forces in Al Garrahi. The Apache, attacked Houthis hiding in farms and their reinforcements, while the ground forces engaged the Houthis in the front lines. About 15 Houthis were killed. At the end of the day, the coalition had captured Al-Kassayah camp, a camp used by Houthis to host their reinforcements.

On the 10 February, the Houthi commander in Hays, Omar al-Ansi, retreated in al Garrahi, but was executed for abandoning the battlefield. On the same day, the coalition managed to besiege Al Garrahi, and during clashes, a Houthi commander, Yunus Ibrahim Amer, was killed in the battle.

On the 11 February, the coalition captured some villages in Garrahi.

On the 12 February, coalition forces advanced further in Garrahi, while due to coalition bombardments, Houthi reinforcements sent in to assist at recapturing Hays, were now locked in the fighting for Garrahi, were scattered in the rural areas of the neighboring Zabid district.

On the 13 February, the Houthis counterattacked in the areas of Garrahi that were captured by the coalition, but were pushed back after coalition bombardments killed 41 of them, and wounded dozens others. Meanwhile, the commander of Tihamah, Abdulrahman Hajri, claimed that during the fighting of Garrahi, 400 Houthis were killed and 100 captured.

On the 14 February, the coalition's fighters besieged Houthi remnants in Hays, who were hiding in Jabal Dabbas, resulting in the group, 6 in their numbers, to surrender. Additionally the Houthis from Garrahi, launched a pincer attack aiming at recapturing Hays, but after fighting and airstrikes, they were pushed back in Garrahi. On the same day, an airstrike killed 8 Houthis in the Hodeidah airport.

On the 16 February, the Houthi leader, Abdel-Malik Al-Houthi, sent his cousin, Mohammed Ali al-Houthi in Garrahi frontline, in an effort to boost morale. On the same day, Tareq Saleh, and his army, the National Resistance, arrived at the front.

On the 17 February, coalition forces advanced in Garrahi's small town of Beit Bish, and clashed with Houthi defenders. At the same time, Houthis shelled Hays district.

On the 18 February, one UAE soldier was killed, and two wounded battling the Houthis.

Between the 18 and 20 February, Houthis lost more than 100 fighters in fierce clashes with government forces or in air strikes by Saudi-led coalition on the seacoast battlefield, according to Yemen's Defence Ministry. Houthi commander Sharaf Abdullah Al-Makeni Abu Mohammed was also killed. 21 soldiers of the coalition were also killed.

On the 21 February, Houthi commander Ahmed bin Ahmed al-Washli, was killed alongside 7 of his soldiers when his group attempted to infiltrate coalition controlled territory in Garrahi.

On the 23 February, the coalition launched an attack from the east, fighting the Houthis in Jabal ras. There were killed and wounded on both sides. The coalition forces failed to make any advance.

On the 27 February, the coalition claimed that they had reached the border between Al-Garrahi and Jabal Ra's district.

On the 28 February, 5 girls were killed by a coalition airstrike in Hays.

On the 4 March, Houthi fighters closed all roads and created defensive lines in al-Garrahi, as the coalition's offensive had failed to make any big gains.

=== Tuhayat offensive ===
On 6 March, Pro-Hadi media claimed that Saudi-led coalition fighter jets struck an Houthis gathering, killing about 100 Houthis fighters in Al Bouga’a region of At Tuhayat district .

On 7 March, Southern Giants Brigades, Tihama resistance, Hadi loyals, and the National Resistance, held a meeting, giving the position of supreme commander of the coalition during the campaign to Hodeidah to Tariq Saleh, replacing southern Giants commander Abu Zaraa Al-Mahramy. All five Southern brigades and three Tihama brigades were present during the meeting.

On 8 March, coalition forces attacked Tuhayat, but Houthis repelled the attack. On the same day, Houthis attacked Hays, but were repelled by the coalition. Scores were reportedly killed from both sides.

On 9 March, Saudi planes bombed Houthi positions in Al Mansuriyah district.

On 16 March, after coalition bombardments on Houthi position across the province, Houthis attacked Khawkhah in boats, but coalition naval forces repelled the attack.

On 18 March, the coalition claimed that 60 Houthis were killed and 40 wounded in airstrikes across Hodeidah.

On 21 March, the coalition captured Jabal Ras, they claimed that scores of Houthis fighters were killed and wounded. On the same day, six Southern Movement fighters were killed in Hays in a Houthi ambush.

On 23 March, 5 civilians were killed by an airstrike in Hodeidah. On 26 March, Houthis shelled Hays.

On 31 March, the coalition claimed that 150 Houthis were killed and wounded by airstrikes in their positions in Az Zuhrah district.

On 19 April Saleh Ali al-Sammad, head of the Supreme Political Council, was killed in an air raid in the al-Buraihi area of Hudaydah province.

On 27 May, it was reported that loyalists had been trying to seize Al Houthi-held areas along the western coast. More than 150 people were killed in heavy fighting. The same day UAE-backed loyalists captured the Durahemi district.

=== Battle of Al Hudaydah ===
According to Yemeni officials, on 13 June 2018, approximately 2,000 Emirati troops assaulted Hudaida, departing from a UAE naval base in Eritrea. A worker for CARE reported hearing at least 30 airstrikes on the first day of fighting as the city population was caught in panic.

=== Later clashes ===
On 13 November 2021, Saudi led-coalition forces left their positions around Hudaydah city. UAE backed forces also withdrew from southern Hudaydah, and their positions were later occupied by Houthi forces.

On 14 November 2021, clashes were reported in Al Faza, a town located 15 km from Saudi Coalition held Al-Khokha.

On 20 November 2021, further clashes were reported in the Hays district south of Al Hudaydah. Houthi forces clashes with Hadi Government forces killing a Commander of the Republican Guard, Col. Shehab Mahmoud died by a missile strike.

On 24 November 2021, Ahmed Al-Kawkabani leader of a unit of the Saudi led Coalition, survived an assassination attempt. A IED was planted to kill the leader of Tahama Brigades near Hays. Fouad Jahannam, another military leader of the Hadi government Tahama Brigades was target of an assassination attack on Al-Jarahi northern Hays, that left him injured.

On 18 December 2021, Cmder. Farhan al-Saeedi of the Eighth Brigade of Yemeni National Resistance was killed by a mine explosion in Al-Hudaydah.

On 2 April 2022, another UN-initiated ceasefire took effect, leaving the Houthis in control of Al Hudaydah Governorate.

== See also ==
- Battle of Aleppo (2012–2016)
- Battle of Benghazi (2014–2017)
- Northwestern Syria offensive (2019–2020)
