= Ammar Saleh =

Yemeni intelligence official

- عمار صالح

Chief of Intelligence of the National Resistance Forces
- Incumbent
- Assumed office c. 2017
- President: Abdrabbuh Mansour Hadi; Rashad al-Alimi
- Leader: Tareq Saleh

Military attaché to the Embassy of Yemen, Addis Ababa
- In office 10 April 2013 – 5 June 2015
- President: Abdrabbuh Mansour Hadi

Deputy Director of the National Security Bureau
- In office c. 2002 – 21 May 2012
- President: Ali Abdullah Saleh; Abdrabbuh Mansour Hadi
- Director: Ali Mohammed al-Anisi

Personal details
- Parent: Mohammed Abdullah Saleh (father)
- Relatives: Saleh family

Military service
- Allegiance: Yemen (c. 2002–2015; 2017–present); Houthi-controlled Yemen (2014–2017)

Ammar Mohammed Abdullah Saleh (Note: Arabic: عمار محمد عبد الله صالح) is a Yemeni intelligence official who is chief of intelligence in the National Resistance Forces, a paramilitary group allied to the internationally recognized government of Yemen. A nephew of former president Ali Abdullah Saleh, he was the deputy director of the National Security Bureau from its inception in 2002 until 2012, but was regarded as the de facto director.

== Biography ==
Ammar is the son of Mohammed Abdullah Saleh, former commander of the Central Security Forces and brother of Ali Abdullah Saleh, who ruled over Yemen for years as President. He is the brother of Yahya and Tareq, each of whom held high-ranking positions in the security apparatus of the Saleh regime.

=== National Security Bureau ===
Ammar was appointed deputy director of the National Security Bureau (NSB) upon its formation in 2002. The intelligence agency was established to provide Western counterparts with a "more professional counterterrorism partner" than the Political Security Organization, which was perceived as corrupt and compromised with Islamists. Although he officially worked under director Ali Mohammed al-Anisi, Ammar was effectively the de facto head of the NSB and reported directly to the president. The NSB was notorious for torture and suppressing political opposition to the regime, and was employed with Ammar's tribal and familial relatives to ensure loyalty.

The NSB contributed to the counterterrorism campaign against al-Qaeda in the Arabian Peninsula (AQAP). Ammar personally coordinated an operation in Marib against an AQAP cell in July 2009, but it was bungled by security forces and ended in him negotiating for the release of captured soldiers. Alongside the Central Intelligence Agency and MI6, the NSB coordinated drone strike launched by the United States against AQAP, Ammar being required to personally grant his permission before they took place. According to HOOD, a Yemeni human rights group, the NSB was involved in detaining hundreds of terrorism suspects for years, often without charges. Ammar said the government would welcome the repatriation of Yemeni detainees at Guantanamo Bay, but would not imprison them without access to evidence from the United States.

=== Yemeni revolution and Hadi administration ===
The Yemeni revolution posed a threat to the regime and the "young guard" of the Saleh family, including Ammar. The NSB was involved in dispersing protesters during the revolution. According to the Foreign Policy Association, in the aftermath of the massacre of protestors in Sanaa on 18 March 2011 much of the backlash was directed at Ammar and other Saleh relatives in the security apparatus. Pro-opposition tribal figure Himyar Abdullah al-Ahmar accused him of supervising an alleged NSB plot to assassinate opposition figures including Hamid al-Ahmar. Laura Kasinof, then a correspondent for The New York Times, claimed Ammar admitted to her during a conversation that the NSB was using sound bombs to intimidate protestors. She said Ammar and others within the regime perceived the protests as a side issue relative to the intensified power struggle between them and the powerful al-Ahmar tribe.

Saleh eventually stepped down as president in February 2012, being succeeded by Abdrabbuh Mansour Hadi. However, he maintained loyalty among some high-ranking officials in the government, such as Ammar, who were intent on undermining the Hadi administration. After a major terrorist attack in Sanaa on 21 May, in which an AQAP suicide bomber infiltrated a military parade rehearsal, Ammar was dismissed from the position of NSB deputy director by Hadi. The handover to his successor, Mohammed Jameh al-Khadar, took place the same day without issue. Alongside other former officials, Ammar received a government position overseas as the military attaché to Ethiopia on 10 April 2013.

=== Yemeni civil war ===
In December 2014, Arabi21 reported that Ammar was involved in the capture of Sanaa by the Houthis two months earlier, which instigated the Yemeni civil war. The newspaper claimed that through his lingering connections in the NSB, he was coordinating with Saleh loyalists in the security forces as well as the Houthis from his home in Sanaa, and directed the capture of security and military installations in Sanaa and raids on the homes of Islah figures. In an interview with Al-Araby Al-Jadeed, activist Tawakkol Karman corroborated these claims and accused Ammar of having ordered a raid on her house by the Houthis during the capture. According to Al-Quds Al-Arabi, Ammar fled Yemen to Addis Ababa on 31 May 2015, after the homes of various members of the Saleh family were targeted by airstrikes.

On 5 June 2015, Al Jazeera premiered an interview with Hani Mujahid, who claimed to have been a former al-Qaeda informant for the NSB managed directly by Ammar. He accused the former regime of having collaborated with al-Qaeda, and Ammar specifically of using him as a courier to funnel money to al-Qaeda as well as explosives used in an attack on the United States embassy in 2008. He also claimed that AQAP leader Qasim al-Raymi was working in coordination with Ammar. The day the film was released, Ammar was dismissed from the military and his role as attaché by a presidential decree and was referred to trial. Ammar then fled Ethiopia to the United Arab Emirates to avoid arrest. The Saudi-led coalition launched an airstrike on his home in Sanaa on 6 July, after which he released a statement vowing retaliation.

In 2020, the Houthis accused Ammar of having participated in a secret program to destroy Yemen's air defense systems during his NSB tenure, allegedly bribing military officials to go through with sabotage at the behest of Saleh and the US. He was tried in absentia by a Houthi court and sentenced to death in 2022. In May 2024, they claimed Ammar was in charge of a dismantled espionage cell aiding the US and the UK in their attacks on Houthi-controlled Yemen as well as Israel. Since 2017, Ammar was believed to have resurfaced in Yemen's political scene, serving as the head of the intelligence of division of the National Resistance Forces, a pro-government group led by his brother Tareq and linked to the UAE.
