= List of armed groups in the Yemeni civil war =

Military situation in the Yemeni civil war. Yemeni government led by the Presidential Leadership Council (PLC) (since 2022) Supreme Political Council (SPC) of the Houthi (since 2016) Al-Qaeda in the Arabian Peninsula (AQAP) (since 2009)

A number of armed groups have involved themselves in the ongoing Yemeni civil war.

== Yemeni civil war (2014–present) ==
Yemeni government and allies	Supreme Political Council (formerly Supreme Revolutionary Committee) and allies	Southern Movement	Islamic State of Iraq and the Levant Ansar al-Sharia and allies
Hadi/Alimi government: Pro-Hadi/Alimi Security forces; 3rd Military Region; 112th Infantry Brigade; 4th Military Region; Armored Brigade 35; 111th Infantry Brigade; Homeland Shield Forces; Allied groups: Alliance of Yemeni Tribes; Al-Islah; Popular Resistance; Pro-Hadi/Alimi Popular Committees; Hadhramaut Tribal Alliance; Hadhramaut Protection Forces; Salafist militias (from late 2015); Supported by: Qatar (only Al-Islah); Saudi Arabia; Saleh loyalists (from 2017): Republican Guard (from 2017); National Resistance; Supported by: Saudi Arabia; United Arab Emirates; Saudi-led coalition: Saudi Arabia; Armed Forces of Saudi Arabia; Saudi Arabian Army; Royal Saudi Air Force; Special Forces (alleged); United Arab Emirates (until 2019); United Arab Emirates Armed Forces; United Arab Emirates Army; Bahrain; South Korea; Republic of Korea Armed Forces; Republic of Korea Army; National Intelligence Service; Kuwait; Jordan; Morocco (until 2019); Qatar (until 2017; since 2026); Senegal; Sudan (historically) (currently unclear); Sudanese Armed Forces; Sudanese Army; Rapid Support Forces (2019); Bangladesh; Comoros; Djibouti; Maldives; Pakistan; Somalia; Turkey; Allied groups: Academi; Supported by: Egypt; United Kingdom; France; United States; Canada (arms); Germany (arms, until 2018); Malaysia; Australia; New Zealand; Costa Rica; Ukraine; Belgium; Estonia; Finland; Greece; Italy; Latvia; Netherlands; Sweden; Denmark; Norway; Singapore; Sri Lanka; Logistical support: Eritrea; France; Seychelles; United States (includes drone strikes): United States Armed Forces; United States Navy; Special Operations Command	Supreme Political Council (formerly Supreme Revolutionary Committee): Pro-Houthi Yemeni Armed Forces; Pro-Houthi Yemeni Army; Yemeni Air Force (2015–17); Special Security Forces (2015–17); Pro-Saleh Security Forces (2015–17); Republican Guard (2015–17); Special Operations Forces (2015–17); Allied groups: Houthis; Pro-Houthi Popular Committees; Liwa Fatemiyoun; Liwa Zainebiyoun; Harakat Hezbollah al-Nujaba (alleged, denied); Alleged support: Syria (until 2023); North Korea; Qatar (2017–26); Iran; Hezbollah	Southern Transitional Council (from 2017 until 2026) al-Hizam Brigade (Security Belt) Southern resistance (since September 2026) Hadhrami Elite Forces Southern Resistance Forces (SRF) Shabwani Elite Tihamah Resistance Allied groups: Spear Operations Group (against Al-Islah); Supported by: United Arab Emirates	Islamic State of Iraq and the Levant (from 2014): Military of ISIL; Wilayah al-Yemen; Wilayat Sanaa; Wilayat Aden-Abyan; Wilayah Lahij; Wilayah Green Brigade; Wilayah al-Bayda; Wilayah Shabwah; Wilayah Ataq; Wilayah Hadramawt; Al-Qaeda: AQAP; Ansar al-Sharia; al-Qaeda Emirate in Yemen; Aden-Abyan Islamic Army; Council of Sunni Scholars and al-Jama'a; Hadrami Domestic Council faction; Al-Dhahab tribesmen; Supported by: Al-Shabaab (alleged)

== See also ==
- List of armed groups in the Syrian Civil War spillover in Lebanon
- List of armed groups in the Syrian Civil War
- List of armed groups in the War in Iraq (2013–2017)
- List of armed groups in the Libyan Civil War
- Combatants of the Iraq War
