= Battle of Marib (2009) =

Raid on a village in Yemen

- Part of the al-Qaeda insurgency in Yemen
Date	30 July 2009
Location	Arq al-Shabwan, Marib Governorate, Yemen 15.5°N 45.36°E
Result	AQAP victory: Government forces suffer heavy casualties and withdraw leaving targeted militants alive

Belligerents
Yemen	Al-Qaeda in the Arabian Peninsula; Local tribesmen

Commanders and leaders
Ammar Saleh	Ayad al-Shabwani; Qasim al-Raymi

Units involved
National Security Bureau	Al-Qaeda in the Arabian Peninsula; Abidah tribe; Shabwan clan

Strength
Unknown	18 fighters

Casualties and losses
3 killed, 3–7 wounded, 7 captured; 5 tanks destroyed; 1 weapons truck captured	Per AQAP: None; Per AFP: 4 wounded

On 30 July 2009, Yemeni security forces conducted an operation in Arq al-Shabwan, a village in Marib Governorate, Yemen. Spurred by pressure from the United States, the Yemeni government dispatched the National Security Bureau to coordinate an offensive against a cell of al-Qaeda in the Arabian Peninsula (AQAP). Tanks targeted a compound belonging to militant Ayad al-Shabwani, but accidentally struck an adjacent building belonging to a resident, provoking the local tribes into fighting alongside AQAP. Security forces later withdrew unsuccessful, while a weapons truck with seven soldiers heading to the village was captured. The soldiers were later released.

Government forces suffered heavy losses, including the killing and wounding of several soldiers and the destruction of five tanks. AQAP began to release information on the clashes, referred to as the Battle of Marib, which was denied by the government despite its accuracy. The group later released a video which displays the seven captured soldiers which until then were unacknowledged by the government. Analysts regarded the operation as a failure for the government and a victory for AQAP on the battlefield and in the propaganda realm.

== Background ==
Marib Governorate was a prominent area of activity for al-Qaeda in Yemen for several years. January 2009 saw the formation of al-Qaeda in the Arabian Peninsula (AQAP), a merger of the Yemeni and Saudi Arabian branches of al-Qaeda. Up until the battle, AQAP had been relatively inactive militarily during 2009 with the exception of a string of suicide bombings on South Korean targets in March. The group was mainly concerned with establishing infrastructure and connections in the tribal areas of Yemen, including in Marib.

The United States grew increasingly concerned with the rising threat posed by AQAP, repeatedly sending officials to address the issue with the Yemeni government. On 26 July, US Central Command head General David Petraeus held a meeting with Yemeni president Ali Abdullah Saleh. Petraeus confirmed an increase in financial aid for Yemen, but in return he expected the Yemeni government to intensify action against AQAP. Saleh ordered National Security Bureau (NSB) deputy director Ammar Saleh, who was also his nephew, to Marib in order to address the AQAP presence. He was tasked with neutralizing a local AQAP cell to prove the government's commitment to counterterrorism. Ammar planned out the operation and negotiated an agreement with local tribal sheikhs to conduct it.

== Battle ==
On 30 July 2009, NSB forces launched a raid on Arq al-Shabwan, a remote village in the Abidah tribal region of Marib. The target of the operation was Ayad al-Shabwani, a member of AQAP described by officials as "a sort of local Robin Hood figure." Heavy tanks were supposed to shell an AQAP safehouse where Shabwani was located but accidentally struck a compound next to it belonging to local residents. Clashes proceeded between the military and a band of eight AQAP fighters led by Shabwani, backed by dozens of unaffiliated men from the Shabwan clan who believed their village to be under attack.

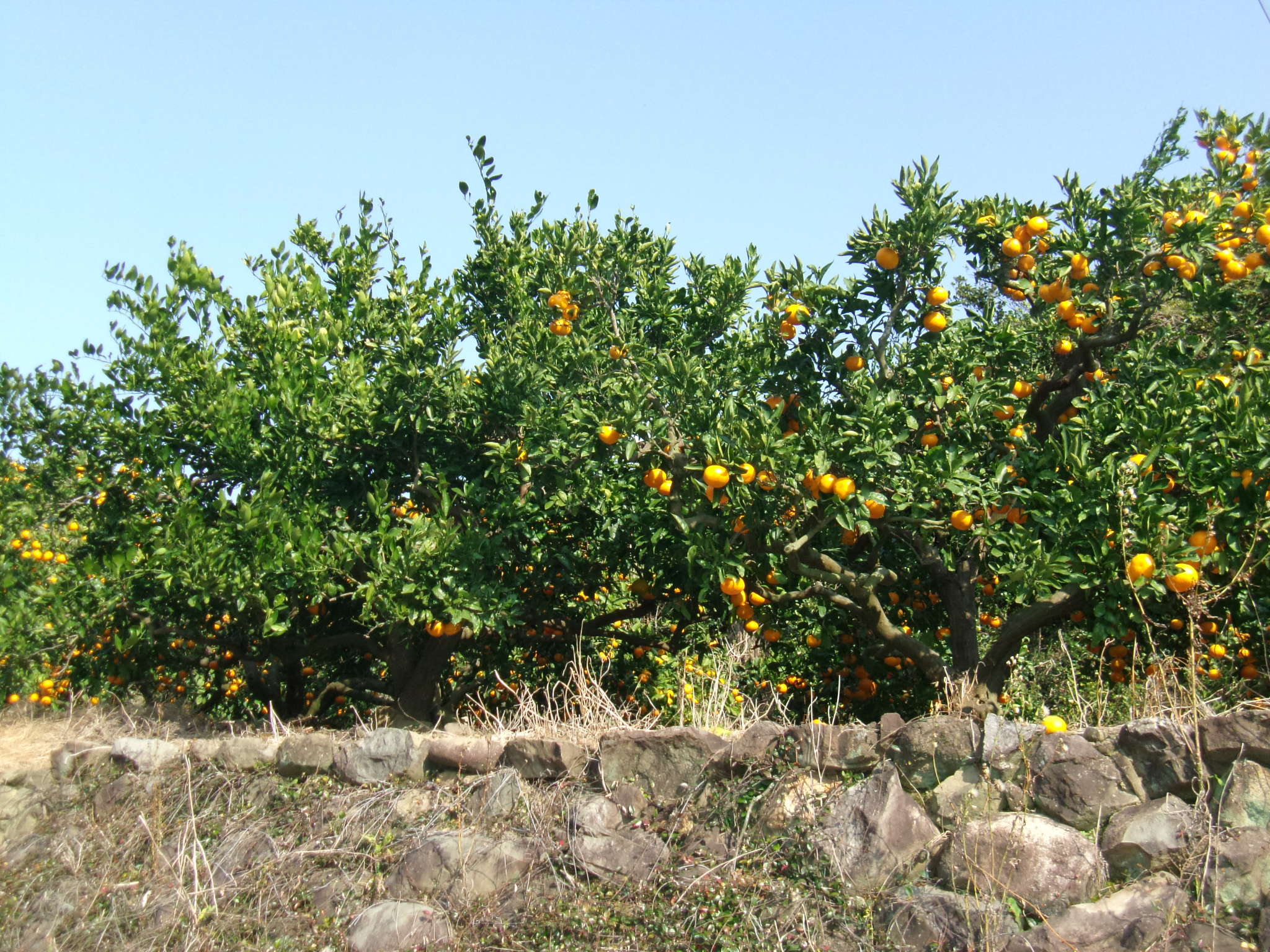
AQAP fighters hid in orange groves to ambush tanks with rocket-propelled grenades

The Ministry of Interior implicated 18 AQAP militants in total with involvement in the battle. Their most wanted suspects were Shabwani, Ali bin Said bin Jameel and Nasser Bin Douha. In the late stages of the clashes, AQAP forces led by Qasim al-Raymi flanked the military and took up positions at nearby orange groves, where they used rocket-propelled grenades to ambush several tanks. After more than six hours of combat, the military withdrew. None of the targeted AQAP members were killed.

As other militants were making their way to the village, they came upon a military cargo truck carrying weapons and money for the tribes but got lost. The militants looted the truck, captured seven soldiers guarding it and transported them to Arq al-Shabwan. Raymi decided against executing the soldiers, instead having them interviewed for a propaganda video. The soldiers were released after tribal mediation between Ammar Saleh and AQAP.

=== Casualties ===
A statement attributed to AQAP claimed that numerous soldiers were killed and wounded, seven were captured, five tanks were destroyed and an army truck was seized, while their forces suffered zero deaths. Local news sources reported the deaths of three soldiers and injuries to seven. This death toll was reported by Agence France-Presse and Reuters, although the former reported that three soldiers and four militants were wounded and that Shabwani was killed, citing "a local official and a tribal source". The government denied media reports and claimed that one soldier was killed and three were wounded.

== Aftermath ==
Conflicting narratives emerged after the battle. AQAP released a statement on 1 August detailing losses suffered by the military, and claimed to have shelled the Republican Palace in Marib while Ammar Saleh was present. It placed blame on the government for initiating the clashes on the behest of Petraeus and Saudi deputy interior minister Muhammad bin Nayef, and urged Yemeni soldiers to reject the war on terror and keep out of Abidah territory and Marib.

The details provided by AQAP were accurate, but the government rejected their description and tried to downplay their failure. Information minister and government spokesperson Hasan al-Lawzi held a press conference on 5 August in which he presented alternate details on the battle and denied the army casualties reported by AQAP. The government claimed it was AQAP which instigated the engagement after attacking the army truck, deemphasized damage to civilian property, and falsely claimed the death of Shabwani.

=== Video ===
On 8 September, an 18-minute video about the engagement titled "The Battle of Marib" was pushlibed online by AQAP. A narrator opens the video framing the operation as an attack on the local tribes authorized through a "betrayal" by the sheikhs." The next narrator, Raymi, criticizes said sheikhs as illegitimate and subservient as to President Saleh, who is labeled a "slave to Saudi riyals and American dollars". He urged the tribes to abandon the government-aligned sheikhs, followed by another narrator praising tribes which supported AQAP.

The video proceeds to describe the events of the battle narrated by Raymi and another individual. Their initial claim of striking the Republican Palace was modified with unnamed security officers occupying it instead of Ammar Saleh. The military equipment captured by the militants during the battle is displayed.

The video emphasized the veracity of casualty count initially presented by AQAP. The seven captured soldiers are shown giving an interview in which they renounce Saleh and the government and promise not to oppose AQAP again. Raymi mocks the government for refusing to acknowledge their losses from the battle. A clip of Lawzi's press conference is then shown in which he does not mention the captured soldiers. This is followed by Raymi declaring that jihadist sources were more accurate and truthful than the government. The video concludes with a narrator stating the captured were spared from execution and that "if you don’t support the mujahedeen, then at least don't stand against them."

== Analysis ==
AQAP is regarded as having won the battle as security forces failed to neutralize their targets and suffered heavy casualties, but its strategic significance has been considered minor. Writing for CTC Sentinel, expert Gregory D. Johnsen said the battle exemplified the difficulty of combating AQAP in light of its growing connections to tribes of Yemen, which could be drawn into a battle with security forces not out of ideological affinity but as a response to perceived government encroachment on their sovereignty. He also noted similarities to another government offensive in Marib in 2001, which was influenced by the US government and saw the unintentional provocation of local tribesmen which resulted in the operation's failure.

Commentators such as Johnsen and The New York Times's Robert F. Worth regarded the video released after the battle as the highest-quality media production from AQAP to date. The video "successfully challenged the Yemeni government's quasimonopoly on information" according to former American ambassador to Yemen Edmund Hull, and the presentation of evidence to verify their claims was a display of credibility and an attempt to garner the moral high ground among Yemenis, many of whom are already distrustful of government narratives. It also served as an appeal to the tribes of Yemen, playing on tribal honor culture and general dissatisfaction with their treatment by the government, and orienting the "innate heroism" of the tribes with AQAP's goal to undermine the government.

A Combating Terrorism Center report on the history of al-Qaeda in Yemen states: "the attacks themselves and narrative that followed significantly raised the social costs of expelling Ayad al-Shabwani from the village or visibly assisting the central government, in essence pushing a community of otherwise disinterested tribesmen closer to AQAP." By August the Yemeni government had reassigned the forces involved with the campaign against AQAP to instead take part in an offensive against the Houthis. Regardless, the operation still proved useful for the Yemeni and American governments as a means of portraying the former as actively engaged in counterterrorism against AQAP. This would allow for covert US military intervention later in the year to be portrayed as Yemeni operations.

== See also ==
- Siege of Lawdar (2010)
