= 2012 Sanaa parade rehearsal bombing =

2012 suicide bombing in Yemen

Unity Day parade rehearsal bombing
- Part of the Yemeni crisis and the al-Qaeda insurgency in Yemen
- Bodies of Yemeni soldiers immediately after the bombing
- Location: 15°19′22″N 44°12′17″E; Al-Sabeen Square, al-Sabeen District, Sanaa, Yemen
- Date: 21 May 2012; 10:00 AST (UTC+3)
- Target: Yemeni soldiers and Defense Minister Mohammed Nasser Ahmed
- Attack type: Suicide bombing
- Deaths: 96
- Injuries: 222
- Perpetrator: Al-Qaeda in the Arabian Peninsula: Ansar al-Sharia
- Motive: Response to the 2012 Abyan offensive

On 21 May 2012, a suicide bomber detonated an explosive belt among groups of Yemeni soldiers rehearsing for the annual Unity Day military parade in Sanaa, Yemen. An 18-year-old soldier recruited as a suicide bomber entered al-Sabeen Square in uniform and joined his Central Security Organization brigade midway through the rehearsal. As the soldiers were passing by the parade view stand, the bomber detonated his explosive belt. The attack, which unsuccessfully attempted to target Yemen's defense minister Mohammed Nasser Ahmed, killed at least 96 soldiers and wounded 222, making it one of the worst in Yemen's history. The bombing was claimed by al-Qaeda in the Arabian Peninsula affiliate Ansar al-Sharia.

== Background ==
Political turmoil in Yemen began to stabilize after the resignation of longtime President Ali Abdullah Saleh in February 2012 and installment of Abdrabbuh Mansur Hadi, allowing the government and military to focus its attention on AQAP and their local affiliate group Ansar al-Sharia, which had seized territory in Abyan and Shabwah governorates the previous year amid the Yemeni revolution. Hadi pledged to liberate the southern governorates from Ansar al-Sharia control and voiced considerable support for U.S. counterterrorism operations. On 11 May 2012, the Yemeni government announced a military offensive with U.S. support against Ansar al-Sharia to retake their territory in Abyan. The offensive had inflicted heavy losses on Ansar al-Sharia by the time of the bombing, with the group losing nearly 150 fighters according to a tally count by AFP. A week prior to the bombing, al-Qaeda released a video in which leader Ayman al-Zawahiri denounced Hadi as a "U.S. agent" and a "traitor."

According to Economist Intelligence Unit analyst Robert Powell, at the time of the bombing AQAP had long been attempting to establish a presence in Sanaa, though their cells were repeatedly broken up by authorities. Prior to the bombing, the groups most recent suicide bombing within Sanaa was the attempted assassination of British ambassador to Yemen Timothy Torlot in April 2010. The capital was mostly spared of AQAP attacks for most of the year due to heavy security and the groups preoccupation with battling Yemeni forces in the south.

Al-Sabeen Square, a busy 10-lane road located in al-Sabeen District near the Yemeni Presidential Palace and the al-Saleh Mosque, is commonly used by the government for large military parades and official celebrations. Prior to the bombing, hundreds of Yemeni soldiers at the Square were rehearsing for the annual military parade celebrating Yemen's Unity Day on 22 May, which marks the unification of North and South Yemen. According to soldiers present at the rehearsal, practice for the parade had been ongoing for the past week, with the group participating being from different branches of the military individually selected by commanders. Security procedures for the event had the soldiers inspected at their base before being transported to the area through military vehicles. The entire road had been sealed off for civilians and vehicles by the Republican Guard for the past 24 hours. Additionally, nearly every entrance to Sanaa and road within the city was guarded by army checkpoints at the time. Yemeni Defense Minister Mohammed Nasser Ahmed as well as Military Chief of Staff Ahmed al-Ashwal were scheduled to greet the soldiers at the end of the rehearsal.

== Bombing ==
Witnesses say that the bomber, a rogue 18-year old soldier from the Central Security Organization (CSO) according to Yemeni soldiers, officials and investigators, entered the parade rehearsal on foot from the western part of the Square wearing an army uniform and a concealed explosive belt. He joined a brigade of CSO soldiers in the middle portion of the parade while it was nearing its conclusion. Just before the explosion, the perpetrator was positioned in the middle of his unit whilst the soldiers were passing in front of and saluting the parade view stand where the defense minister and military chief were. At approximately 10 a.m. AST (UTC+3), the bomber detonated his belt packed with 13,000 shrapnel shards during the playing of the national anthem, minutes before the Defense Minister was set to deliver a speech.

The blast was described as "huge", one soldier reported seeing bodies of soldiers flying through the air. A video of the attack posted on YouTube shows crowds of soldiers fleeing in panic immediately after the blast as well as a pile of corpses. Witnesses describe arms, legs and heads blown off and scattered across a 20 to 30 meter radius in the aftermath of the attack as well as large pools of blood. According to a resident, within minutes of the bombing numerous emergency vehicles had already arrived to treat the wounded. Local paramedics said that the victims were being transported to seven different hospitals across the city, some of the dozens of ambulances taking six or seven victims each. Some of the wounded were being carried on taxis. A Yemeni official reported that bodies were still present at the scene more than an hour after the bombing had occurred. Both the Defense Minister and the Military Chief of Staff were present but far away from the site of the bombing, remaining unharmed.

== Casualties ==
Nearly all of the victims in the attack were Yemeni soldiers, primarily those from the CSO. A doctor treating the wounded described the majority of injuries being to the head, with dozens of people being paralyzed. Initial reports immediately after the bombing reported 63 people dead and 60 others wounded. The number of those killed and injured later rose to at least 90 and 222 respectively according to the Yemeni Defense Ministry. Several news sources report a death toll of 96. Some publications recorded the number of injuries to be over 300. CNN stated that authorities placed the number of those killed at 101 and more than 220 wounded, though several sources such as the Council on Foreign Relations, the United Nations Security Council and the United States Department of State maintain that the attack killed 96 people.

== Perpetrators ==
In a statement emailed to Reuters shortly after the bombing occurred, Ansar al-Sharia claimed responsibility for conducting the attack. The group said that the bombing was done in response to the military offensive, which it calls the "U.S. war", launched against it in southern Yemen earlier in the month. The group threatened more attacks against Yemeni forces if the military did not stop its offensive. The statement, additionally posted on jihadist internet forums and the groups Facebook page, said that the bombing specifically targeted CSO forces due to their “massacres against demonstrators during the recent revolution” as well as their operations against Ansar al-Sharia. It also stated that the primary target of the bombing was the Yemeni Defense Minister. An AQAP source sent a message to BBC Arabic saying that the group had recruited a Yemeni soldier for the bombing.

== Reactions ==
=== Local and foreign governments ===
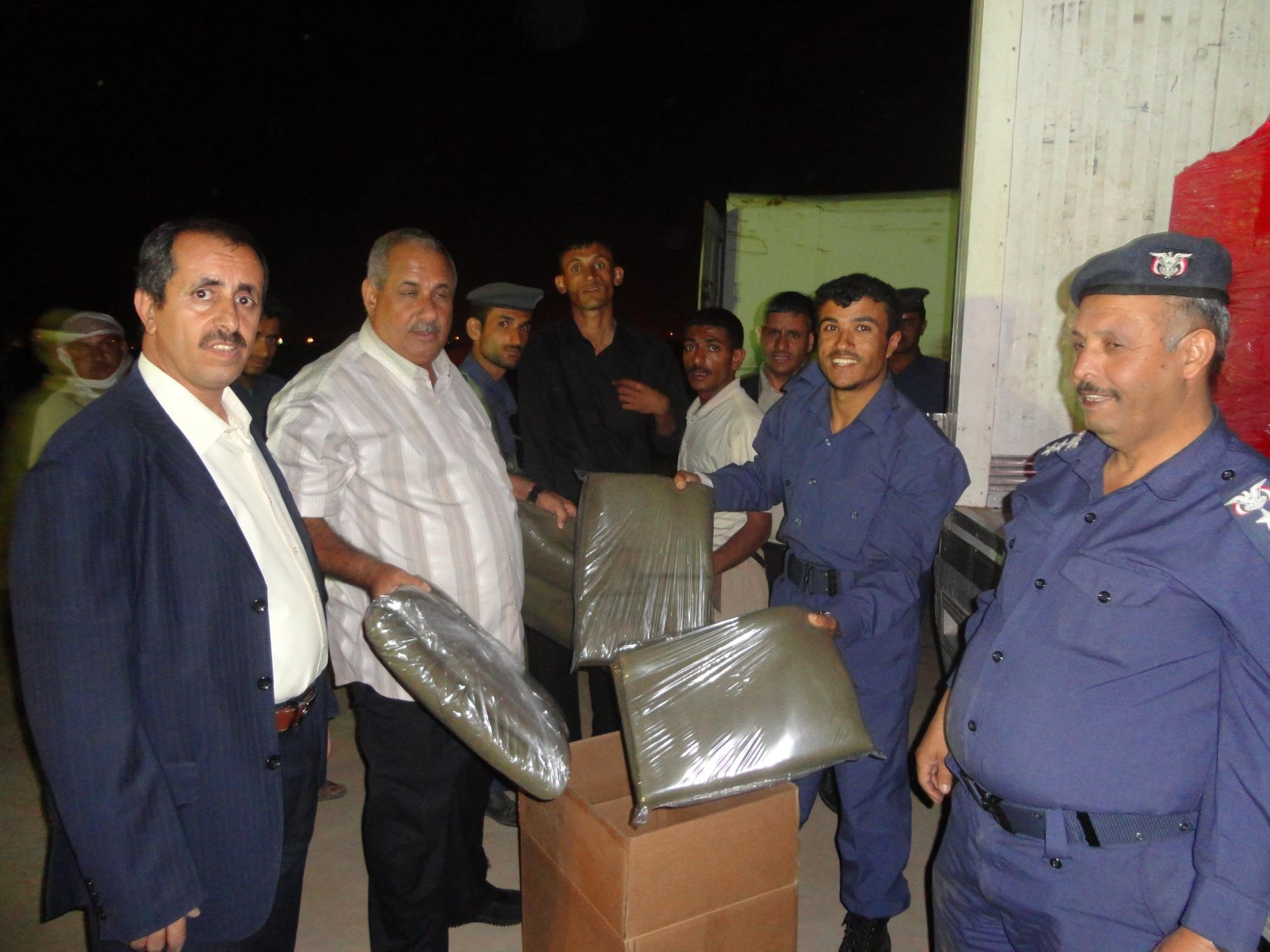
Emergency medical aid for the victims sent by the United States.

Shortly after the bombing, President Hadi fired two senior commanders who were allies of former President Saleh, including CSO Chief of Staff Yahya Saleh. Hadi vowed in a speech televised by the state-ran Saba News Agency to continue fighting AQAP until the group is completely defeated, "whatever the sacrifices are." He offered condolences to the families of soldiers killed in the blast and those participating in the offensive while saying that the attackers "wanted to turn the joy of our people with the unity day into sorrow." He condemned the bombing as a terrorist attack which showed "a moral and religious perversion of the attackers and plotters." A day after the attack, chief of staff Ahmed al-Ashwal stated that the offensive would continue against AQAP.

The White House issued a statement saying that Homeland Security Advisor John Brennan called President Hadi on the day of the attack to extend condolences to the country on behalf of U.S. President Barack Obama. Brennon labeled the attack as "cowardly" and "despicable, while offering U.S. assistance in the investigation. Hadi thanked the U.S. for their assistance in fighting AQAP, and pledged "not to let terrorist acts interfere with Yemen's peaceful political transition." While at a news conference during the 2012 NATO summit in Chicago, Obama assured continued cooperation with the Yemeni government to counter AQAP, calling it important for the safety of Yemen, the wider region and the United States. He also voiced concern over the rise in al-Qaeda activity in Yemen, comparing the prevalence of terrorism in Yemen's to that of the Federally Administered Tribal Areas in northwest Pakistan.

UK Foreign Office Minister Alistair Burt strongly condemned the attack, calling it 'cowardly'. He added that "this tragic event underlines the scale of the security challenge facing the Yemeni government as it seeks to introduce key reforms and work towards completing political transition." Minister of State for International Development Alan Duncan said that the "terrible suicide bombing" had served as a reminder for the challenges faced by Yemen, and that foreign support for the country needs to be maintained in order for further progress against terrorism. In a statement published by the Élysée Palace, French President François Hollande condemned the attack in the "strongest terms", labeling it "barbaric" and expressessing solidarity with the victims and the Yemeni government. Saudi King Abdullah bin Abdulaziz sent a cable of condolences to President Hadi following the attack. Russian President Vladimir Putin called an attack a "barbaric crime" during a call with President Hadi. The Turkish, Czech and Iraqi foreign ministries issued statements condemning the bombing.

=== Regional and international organizations ===
UN secretary-general Ban Ki-moon condemned the attack and called for those involved to be brought to justice. He also urged the people of Yemen to fully implement the negotiated political transition that had replaced the administration of President Saleh with that of Hadi following the revolution. The UN Security Council also issued a statement condemning the attack and reiterated their "determination to combat all forms of terrorism." European Union foreign affairs head Catherine Ashton affirmed the EU's support and willingness to assist in the country's political transition.

Gulf Cooperation Council secretary-general Abdul Latif al-Zayani phoned President Hadi to express his condolences and "stressed that the GCC States will spare no effort to back Yemen in order to achieve the desired stability and development." Organization of the Islamic Cooperation secretary-general Ekmeleddin İhsanoğlu "voiced hope that the Yemeni national unity government would be able to continue its efforts to stabilize the country and restore peace at an early date." Arab League secretary-general Nabil Elaraby said there were "elements who try to impede the efforts of Arab and international efforts to help Yemen overcome the challenges of the transitional stage."

=== Militant groups ===
Somali al-Qaeda affiliate al-Shabaab congratulated AQAP on its "martyrdom operation" through the groups Twitter account.

== Analysis ==
Several commentators and analysts noted the fact that the attack occurred in Sanaa, suggesting that AQAP may have a larger presence in the capital than previously thought. The Washington Post recognized the attack as being "far outside [AQAP's] sphere of influence in the south", signalling a geographical shift in the groups operations. Georgetown University terrorism expert Bruce Hoffman said that AQAP's ability to infiltrate security forces in Sanaa shows that the group is increasing in strength rather than being weakened, and "speaks volumes about [AQAP's] existing capabilities and trajectory." Jane Ferguson of Al Jazeera described the attack as a "huge blow" and "ruthlessly symbolic", viewing AQAP as a more modern and menacing replacement to Yemen's southern separatists. She further added that the attack could be seen as either a tour de force by AQAP or a sign of the groups desperation due to losing hundreds of fighters in the south due to the Yemeni offensive. Jeremy Scahill of The Nation called the bombing AQAP's response to "an intensifying U.S. war" and the group showcasing the weakness of the Yemeni government. The New York Times said that the attack would likely weaken the morale of Yemeni security forces, which had already been low due to poor pay, ill treatment, insufficient training and corruption. They also viewed the attack as a sign that AQAP is "less concerned about negative publicity" due to the intensified conflict to keep their territory in the south. In order to maintain support from locals, AQAP had previously refrained from targeting low-ranking soldiers in attacks, instead urging them to defect and releasing them in some cases.

== Investigation ==
Hours after the initial blast, Sanaa authorities arrested two men at a nearby park wearing suicide belts loaded with 13 kilograms (28.6 pounds) of explosives, reportedly attempting to conduct another attack. On 20 June 2012, Yemeni authorities arrested Majed al-Qulaisi, a member of the AQAP cell which conducted the attack. On 29 June, authorities arrested a reported 10-man cell accused of facilitating the bombing, along with recovering the last testament of the bomber in the attack. On 2 October 2013, five people were sentenced to prison for up to 10 years for taking part in the attack, while three others were acquitted and three more released on conditions that they would be under police supervision for a year. The judge also ordered an investigation into three former senior security officials, including Yahya Saleh, for failing to prevent the bombing.

== Aftermath ==
The Unity Day parade was held on schedule the following day at a "secret" location in the Sanaa air force academy. President Hadi viewed the ceremony behind a bullet-proof glass shield surrounded by heavy security, along with other senior civilian and military officials. According to Turkish Ambassador Fazli Corman, "Not a single seat was left empty, all the foreign ambassadors were there, it was a strong message of solidarity on the part of the Yemeni government." Funerals for 67 victims in the attack were held on 24 May.

On 11 July 2012, an AQAP suicide outside of a police academy in Sanaa killed 10 people and wounded 15. On 11 September 2012, AQAP again attempted to assassinate the Yemeni defense minister in Sanaa through a car bombing, though he survived the attack which instead killed seven of his bodyguards and five civilians.

== See also ==
- 2013 Yemeni Ministry of Defense attack
