= Bin Ashur =

Coordinates: 32.877208°N 13.212605°E

Bin Ashur is a neighbourhood of Tripoli, Libya.

The densely populated area housed many diplomats and was considered to be a wealthy area. United States bombing in 1986 devastated the neighbourhood. Eiji Tanaka, the Ambassador of Japan to Libya, speculated that the U.S. bombs were intended to reach the Central Security Organization behind the Embassy of France to Libya, which received damage.
