= SNACC =

SNACC may refer to:

- The Shinnecock Native American Cultural Coalition, formed to establish a Native American arts and crafts program for the Shinnecock Indian Nation
- The Supreme National Authority for Combating Corruption, formed to fight corruption in Yemen
