= National Resistance Forces =

Paramilitary group led by Tareq Saleh

- المقاومة الوطنية اليمنية
- Leader: Tareq Saleh
- Spokesperson: Sadiq al-Duwaid
- Dates active: December 2017 – present
- Groups: Guardians of the Republic; Southern Giants Brigades; Tihamah Resistance
- Headquarters: Taiz
- Active regions: Yemen
- Ideology: anti-Houthis; Arab nationalism
- Size: 3,000–10,000
- Wars: Yemeni Civil War

The National Resistance Forces (Arabic: المقاومة الوطنية اليمنية, romanized: Al-Muqawamat al-Wataniyah al-Yamaniyah), also called Guards of the Republic, is a coalition of former members of the Yemeni Republican Guard and Central Security Organization commanded by Tareq Saleh, nephew of former Yemeni President Ali Abdullah Saleh, and loyal to the Hadi-led government fighting against the Houthi movement in the Yemeni civil war.

== Organization ==
Founded after the Battle of Sanaa (2017) with support from the United Arab Emirates (UAE), the National Resistance consists of the private army of Tareq Saleh, generally known as "Guardians of the Republic", formed from former members of the Republican Guard and the Central Security Organization. Highly experienced veterans, they are widely regarded to be among the best equipped and trained troops in the anti-Houthi coalition, and have significantly boosted the military strength of the Hadi government. The group is closely allied with Tihamah Resistance and Southern Movement's Giants Brigades. However, the "Guardians of the Republic" are only loyal to Tareq Saleh, and have no real loyalty to President Hadi. As result, they have been criticized and even attacked by anti-Saleh forces in Yemen, such as the Southern Movement and the citizens of Taiz.

Furthermore, The National reported that two more groups were part of the National Resistance: The Giants Brigades, also known as Al Amalaqah Brigades, and the Tihamah Resistance. The later are Popular Resistance forces from Aden and Lahij Governorate that enjoy strong UAE support and were fiercely loyal to late Ali Abdullah Saleh. The second militia mostly consists of tribal fighters who are from al Hudaydah and surroundings, and are deeply hostile to the Houthis.

== See also ==
- List of armed groups in the Yemeni civil war
- Saudi-led intervention in the Yemeni civil war
- Terrorism in Yemen
