= Tihamah Resistance =

Western Yemeni anti-Houthi armed group

- مقاومة تهامة; Muqawamat Tihamah
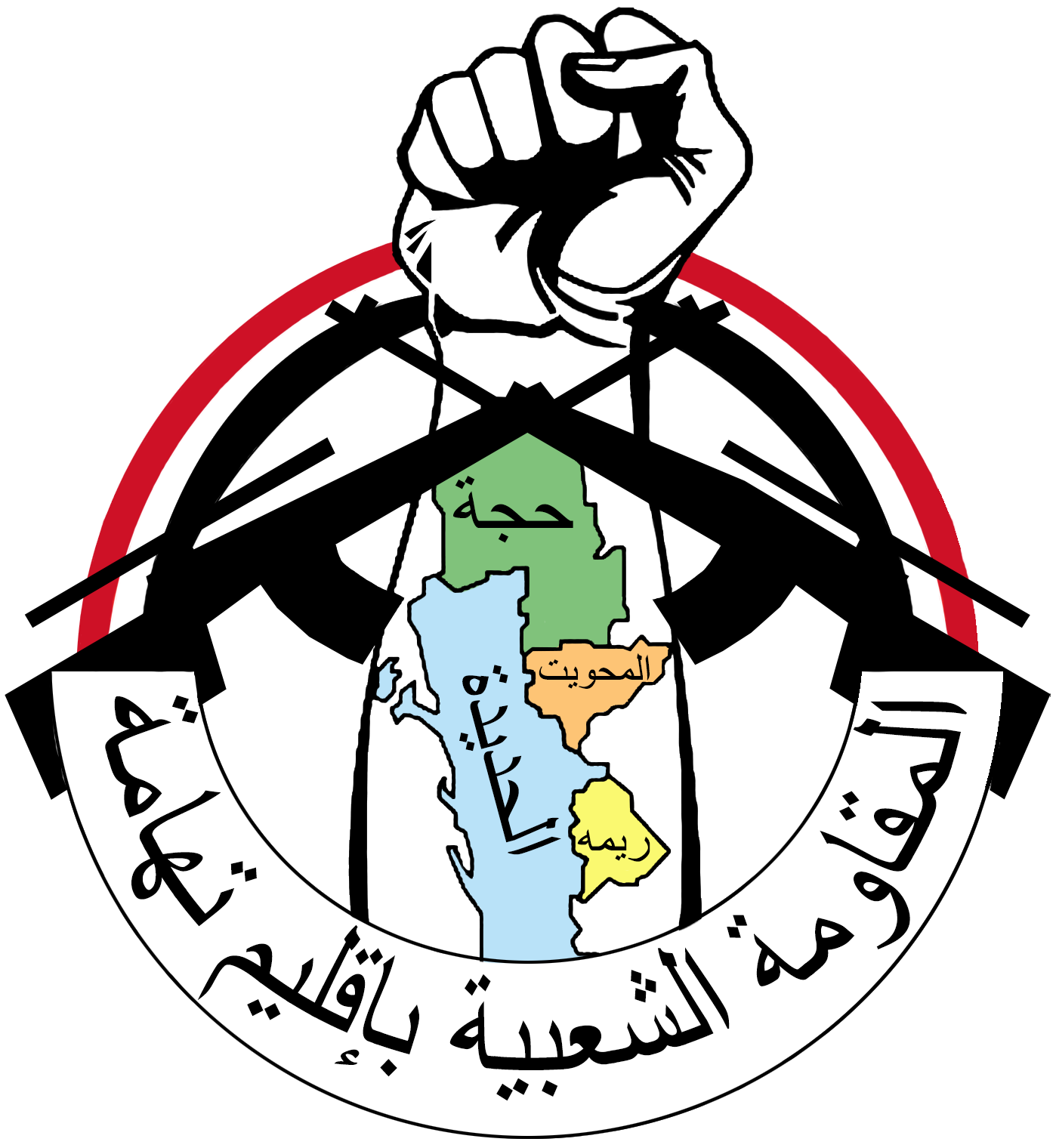
- Logo used by the Tihamah Resistance
- Leader: Abdulrahman Al-Hajjri
- Headquarters: Al Khawkhah District, Al Hudaydah Governorate
- Active regions: Yemen
- Part of: Yemeni National Resistance
- Wars: the Yemeni Civil War

The Tihamah Resistance is an armed group formed by locals of Yemen's Tihamah Region, aiming to resist Houthi control of the west coast region of Yemen. The group was formed in 2014, when Houthis seized Al Hudaydah and the rest of North-Western Yemen. The group was active in 2015 at the start of the war, participating in the Battle of Taiz on the side of the pro-Hadi coalition. In December 2017, the group took part in the Al Hudaydah governorate offensive, alongside UAE, Saudi, Hadi loyalists and Southern Movement fighters. The group is closely aligned with Tareq Saleh's National Resistance, and the Giants Brigades.

== See also ==
- Southern Movement
- Houthi Movement
- Battle of Al Hudaydah
