= Battle of Sanaa (2017) =

Battle fought in Yemen

- Part of the Yemeni crisis and the Yemeni civil war (2014–present)
- Situation in Sanaa, early December 2017 Houthi control Saleh control (Before being expelled)
Date	28 November 2017 – 4 December 2017 (6 days)
Location	Sanaa, Yemen
Result	Houthi victory: Ali Abdullah Saleh killed by Houthi forces; Houthis gain full control of Sanaa

Belligerents
Supreme Political Council: Houthis; General People's Congress (pro-Houthi wing)	Saleh loyalists: General People's Congress (pro-Saleh wing); Republican Guard; Saudi-led coalition: Saudi Arabia; United Arab Emirates

Commanders and leaders
Abdul-Malik al-Houthi; Mohammed Ali al-Houthi; Saleh Ali al-Sammad	Ali Abdullah Saleh †; Tareq Saleh (WIA); Khaled Ali Saleh (POW); Aref al-Zouka †

Casualties and losses
Unknown	Unknown number of killed, 600 soldiers captured and later released
- 234 killed, 400 wounded overall (per the ICRC and the UN)

The Battle of Sanaa in 2017 was fought between forces loyal to Ali Abdullah Saleh and the Houthis in the Yemeni capital of Sanaa. Both sides were allied during the 2014–15 Houthi takeover of the government but the alliance ended when Saleh decided to break ranks with the Houthis and call for dialogue with Saudi Arabia and the United Arab Emirates, who are leading a military intervention in Yemen. Fighting then broke out between the Houthis and forces loyal to Saleh as the Saudi-led coalition began bombing Houthi areas, ultimately resulting in Saleh's death and a Houthi victory.

== Background ==
The Houthis had formed a tactical alliance with Ali Abdullah Saleh, Yemeni President in 1990–2012, after he was deposed in the 2011 Yemeni revolution to which Houthis themselves had contributed. Houthis were also dissatisfied with the new Yemeni president Abdrabbuh Mansur Hadi, a former military officer who had been appointed by the Gulf Cooperation Council, for various reasons. In particular, Hadi had refused to hand them a share in the new government.

The dissatisfaction turned into widespread protests when the Hadi government ordered the removal of fuel subsidies. Houthis organized mass protests and advanced into the capital, Sanaa, taking over government buildings but Hadi and his cabinet suddenly resigned, leaving the office in the hands of the Houthis. Soon afterwards, the Saudis led a military intervention in Yemen to combat the Houthis and fulfil Hadi's wishes to return to power.

From the takeover onwards, the Houthis and Saleh loyalist forces shared administration of Sanaa and the country. Pro-Saleh forces controlled southern Sanaa while the Houthis were in control of the northern part of the capital. The tactical alliance between Saleh, who was deposed in 2012, and the Houthis often appeared fragile, with both groups reserving suspicions as to each other's ultimate motives and sharing little ideological ground.

== Battle ==
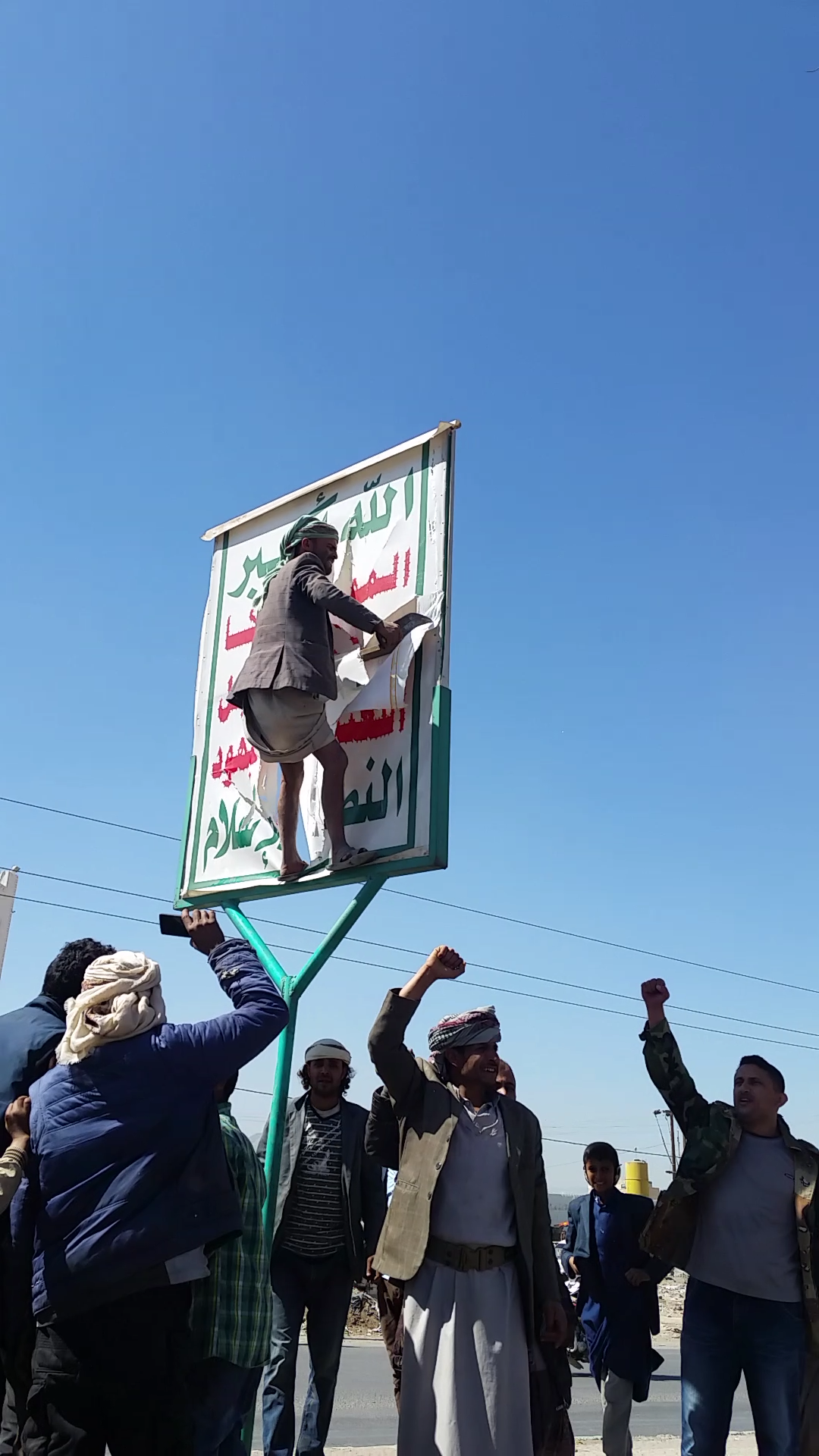
Anti-Houthi protests in Sanaa. (2 December 2017)

On 2 December 2017, four days after the eruption of armed conflict between the Houthis and forces loyal to Ali Abdullah Saleh, he announced his readiness to start a "new page" with Saudi Arabia and United Arab Emirates, a move which was welcomed by the two governments. On 4 December 2017, Saleh officially announced the end of his partnership with the Houthis while Saudi Arabian warplanes were bombing Houthi positions in Sana'a in support of Saleh. The conflict took at least 125 lives and injured 238. According to Ra'iy al-Youm, Saleh's split was an outcome of long-term efforts by Saudi Arabia and the UAE to unravel the Houthi-Saleh alliance after their failure to defeat the Houthis militarily.

It was reported on 4 December that the Bani Bahloul tribe gained control of posts of Houthi militias in southern Sanaa. The tribes of al Hima and Hamadan reportedly controlled other Houthi posts and arrested dozens of Houthi militants, according to Sky News. Also, supervisor of the Houthi militias Abu Mohsen al Qahoum was killed in clashes with General People's Congress (GPC) forces in Sha'oub district of Sanaa. Despite this, the battle turned increasingly against the Saleh loyalists, with GPC secretary general Aref al-Zouka being killed in combat. Many GPC members and Saleh fighters also defected to the Houthis.

=== Death of Saleh ===
On 4 December 2017, having declared Saleh and his militias "treasonous", Houthis disabled his vehicle with a rocket-propelled grenade in an ambush when he was on his way to Ma'rib while trying to flee into Saudi-controlled territories and he was subsequently shot in the head by a Houthi sniper. In response, his son Ahmed, former commander of the Republican Guard, pledged vengeance against Houthis. After Saleh's death the forces aligned with him were routed and their commanders fled the city and fighting in the city subsequently ceased but Saudi-led coalition started pounding areas in the city. Saleh's death is described as an embarrassment in a long list of Saudi foreign policy failures under Mohammad bin Salman. The death toll from clashes between GPC forces and Houthi militias in Sanaa has exceeded 200.

On 4 December, the Houthi leader, Abdul-Malik al-Houthi, congratulated the people for "the fall of the conspiracy" that he alleged was instigated by Saudi Arabia and UAE. Abdul-Malik also noted that it was a certain number of militias and the top leader (Saleh) of the GPC that participated in the sedition while praising "many honorable members of the Congress" who helped Houthis to settle things down.

== Aftermath ==
Situation in Sana'a after expulsion of pro-Saleh forces

On 5 December, tens of thousands of pro-Houthi demonstrators took to the streets in Sanaa. Almasirah, the official Ansar Allah website, reported that the rally was held to "thank God" for the failure of the revolt. The crowd, waving Yemen's national flag, chanted slogans such as "ours is a free revolution, we reject colonization.. through unity and resilience, we defeated the Jewish alliance", according to the website. The rally was reported to have been attended by a large number of women as well as members of GPC who stated that the plot was aimed at the entire people of Yemen without exception. The celebration has been broadly confirmed by other sources.

A large part of the GPC consequently pledged allegiance to the Houthis, and elected Sadeq Ameen Abu Rass as new chairman. Those GPC elements which stayed loyal to the Saleh family retreated into Hadi-controlled areas and began to rebuild their military strength to fight the Houthis.

== See also ==
- Battle of Sanaa (2011)
- Battle of Sanaa (2014)
