= Ahmed Saleh =

Yemeni commander (born 1972)

Brigadier General Ahmed Saleh
- أحمد علي عبد الله صالح
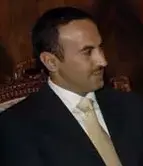
- Saleh in 2008

Ambassador of Yemen to the United Arab Emirates
- In office 19 May 2013 – 29 March 2015
- President: Abdrabbuh Mansour Hadi
- Preceded by: Abdullah al-Dafa'i
- Succeeded by: Fahd Saeed Al-Menhali

Personal details
- Born: July 25, 1972 (age 54) Sanaa, Yemen Arab Republic
- Parent: Ali Abdullah Saleh (father)
- Relatives: Mohammed Abdullah Saleh (uncle); Yahya Saleh (cousin); Tareq Saleh (cousin)

Military service
- Allegiance: Yemen
- Branch/service: Yemeni Land Forces
- Years of service: 1999–2012; 2014–present
- Rank: Brigadier General
- Unit: Republican Guard (2004–2012); Special Security Forces (1999–2012)
- Battles/wars: Yemeni civil war (2014–present)

Ahmed Ali Abdullah Saleh al-Ahmar (Arabic: أحمد علي عبد الله صالح الأحمر; born July 25, 1972) is the eldest son of former Yemeni President Ali Abdullah Saleh, and was a commander of approximately 80,000 troops of the Republican Guard unit of the Yemeni Army.

On April 14, 2015, the United States Department of the Treasury's Office of Foreign Assets Control added Saleh to the list of Specially Designated Nationals, barring US citizens and businesses from interacting with Saleh or his assets.

== Early life ==
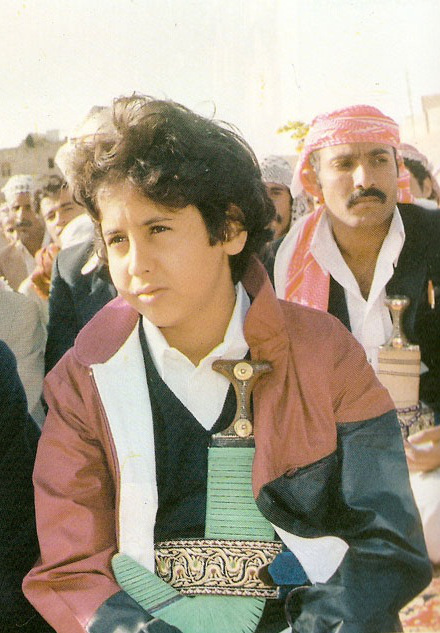
Saleh in 1984

Ahmed's mother died when he was a young boy. Before his father's resignation, Ahmed was widely seen as being groomed to eventually replace him.

== Military career ==
On December 15, 2012, amid tensions between Republican Guard units and President Hadi, Brig. Gen. Ahmed Saleh refused to relinquish control of long-range missiles to the Defense Ministry, stoking fears of further clashing. On December 19, President Hadi responded by issuing decrees announcing a restructuring of the military into four main branches including the land forces, the navy, the air force, and the border forces, effectively dissolving the Republican Guard and rendering Ahmed Saleh's position unnecessary. This was widely seen as an effort on President Hadi's part to weaken the influence of Yemen's political and military elite.

Though no longer in command of the Republican Guard, Ahmed Saleh apparently remained a part of the military, but in what capacity is unclear. As recently as February 3, 2013, National Yemen newspaper reported him as having met with both President Hadi and the remaining leadership of the Republican Guard.

== Post-military career ==
Saleh was sworn in as Yemen's Ambassador to the United Arab Emirates by Yemeni president Abdrabbuh Mansur Hadi on 19 May 2013. The ceremony was also attended by UAE President Khalifa bin Zayed Al Nahyan, Yemeni Foreign Minister Abu Bakr al-Qirbi, and the Secretary-General of the Presidency of the Republic, Dr. Ali Mansour bin Svaa. al-Nahyan emphasized the importance of Saleh's appointment as part of efforts to maintain close relations between the two countries.

President Hadi had announced Ahmed's dismissal on 29 March 2015, following the outbreak of the Yemeni civil war. Ahmed Saleh and his father were initially allied with the Houthis, which are fighting against forces loyal to Hadi. The UAE terminated Saleh's ambassadorship on 7 April 2015 and revoked his diplomatic immunity. He was reported to have been placed under house arrest in his residence in Abu Dhabi. After his father was killed by the Houthis in 2017, Ahmed Saleh declared his animosity against the Houthis.

As of May 2018, Saleh was living in his residence in Abu Dhabi and was reported to have intensified efforts to garner support from former senior members of the General People's Congress against the Houthis.
