= National Security Bureau (Yemen) =

Government agency of Yemen

Agency overview
- Formed: 6 August 2001
- Jurisdiction: Government of Yemen
- Headquarters: Sana'a, Aden
- Agency executive: Maj. Gen. Ali al-Masabi

The National Security Bureau (NSB) (Arabic: جهاز الأمن القومي (اليمن)) is a state security intelligence-gathering agency of Yemen, responsible for the protection of the country from acts of foreign interference. The NSB reports directly to the office of the President of Yemen.

== History ==
NSB was established in 2002 by President Ali Abdullah Saleh. It was headquartered in Sana'a. The NSB director is appointed by President of Yemen. It was led by Ali Mohammed Al-Anisi since its establishment until 2012. His deputy was Ammar Mohammed Saleh, nephew of former Yemeni president Ali Abduallah Saleh, until 2012. Both were close to President Saleh. Following an assassination attempt that targeted the defence minister in Sana'a with a car bomb, President Abdurabbuh Mansur Hadi sacked both and appointed Ali al-Ahmadi as chief of the NSB on 1 September 2012.

== Mission ==
Its main responsibilities include:

- Monitoring, collecting, analyzing, and processing information and data related to Yemen, as well as intelligence of foreign hostile attitudes and activities that pose a threat to the country's national security, sovereignty, political system, economy and military
- Receiving and analyzing reports and intelligence information from various sources
- Counter intelligence
- Detecting and combating subversive activities that threaten national security

== Directors ==
Chief	Term starts	Term ends
Ali Mohammed al-Ansi	2002	2012
Ali Hassan al-Ahmadi	11 ٍSeptember 2012	28 January 2016
Mohammed Saeed bin Bureik	28 January 2016	28 August 2016
Ahmed Abudllah Naser al-Masabi	29 August 2016	Incumbent
