= Ali Hasan al-Ahmadi =

Yemeni politician

Ambassador of Yemen to Bahrain
- Incumbent
- Assumed office July 2016

Chief of National Security Bureau
- In office September 2012 – 5 January 2016

Fisheries Minister
- In office 2001–2003

Personal details
- Born: 1956 (age 69–70) Shabwah Governorate

Ali Hasan al-Ahmadi (Arabic: علي حسن الأحمدي; born 1956) is a Yemeni politician and diplomat. He has been serving as ambassador of Yemen to Bahrain since 2016.

== Biography ==
He was born in 1956 in Shabwah. He got a PhD in economics in 1991. He held many positions, including governor of Al Baydha Governorate in 1991, and then govern of Hajjah Governorate before his appointment as Minister of Fisheries in 2001. He later served as ambassador of Yemen to Kuwait in 2003. He was elected as governor of Shabwah in 2008 and in 2012 was appointed as chief of National Security Bureau.
