= 2001 Yemeni constitutional referendum =

- 20 February 2001

Results
Choice	Votes	%
Yes	1,871,878	77.24%
No	551,633	22.76%
Valid votes	2,423,511	94.33%
Invalid or blank votes	145,755	5.67%
Total votes	2,569,266	100.00%
Registered voters/turnout	3,945,500	65.12%

A constitutional referendum was held in Yemen on 20 February 2001. The amendments to the constitution were reportedly approved by 77.2% of voters, with a 65.1% turnout.

== Results ==
Choice	Votes	%
For	1,871,878	77.2
Against	551,633	22.8
Invalid/blank votes	145,755	–
Total	2,569,266	100
Registered voters/turnout	3,945,500	65.1
Source: Direct Democracy
