= Al Garrahi district =

Al Garrahi district الجراحي
- District
- Location in Yemen
- Coordinates: 14°00′N 43°25′E
- Country: Yemen
- Governorate: Al Hudaydah

Population (2003)
  - Total: 89,163
- Time zone: UTC+3 (Yemen Standard Time)

Al Garrahi district (Arabic: مديرية الجراحي) is a district of the Al Hudaydah Governorate, Yemen. As of 2003, the district had a population of 89,163 inhabitants.
