= Mohammed Abdullah Saleh =

Yemeni major general (1939–2001)

Major General Mohammed Abdullah Saleh Afash (Arabic: محمد عبد الله صالح ال عفاش; 1939–2001) was the first chief of staff of the Yemeni Central Security Forces and one of its leaders and the brother of former Yemeni president Ali Abdullah Saleh Afash. He died on 14 May 2001 in London and his body was transferred to Sanaa.

== Biography ==
He memorized some of the Quran and then stopped his education after his father's death, and worked in agriculture. In 1956, he was transferred to the city of Sanaa and joined the military corps, where he was sent with some of his colleagues to the city of Al Hudaydah, and there he received training and practical courses, and studied under the mosque Faqih and at the weapons school, and then trained for a year in the nearby city of Bajil before returning to Sanaa. He studied at the Officers' Warrant School, and graduated after two years with the rank of non-commissioned officer, then was assigned some tasks; among them: he worked as a teacher in the fifth company in the defense army, then was assigned to train honorary officers from the sons of sheikhs. Some of them attended the weapons school. During the Republican revolution which toppled the monarchy in 1962, he participated in a number of roles, and was tasked with some of his colleagues with guarding the leadership of the revolution and capturing King Muhammad al-Badr and going to the districts of Thula and Amran, and Shibam Kawkaban. He worked alongside Professor Muhammad Mahmoud Al-Zubairi in preaching and calling for the republican system in some areas, then was appointed as a mentor for the National Guard and was assigned to lead a company of the Guard in a number of battles alongside the Egyptian forces in Yemen, and was assigned with Lieutenant Colonels Ahmed Saad Al-Sayani and Muhammad Al-Kebsi to confront the tribes of Khawlan and Sanhan, when they joined the royal forces, co-sponsored with Yahya al-Nihmi to the Nihm district; for the same purpose, then he returned to the city of Sanaa, from which he led an army to the city of Hajjah. To break the siege, he went to the city of Thula in 'Amran Governorate. It was besieged by the king's forces and was close to capturing it until Lieutenant General Hassan Al-Omari led the operation to break the siege, and went to Taiz as the Commander of a battalion, which was stationed in the areas of Al-Sharijah and Al-Misrakh, near Bab-el-Mandeb. The siege of Sanaa lasted for 70 days; In 1968, he was assigned to lead a group of tribes to lift the siege on the authority of Sheikh Numan Qaid Rajeh in the area of Khamis Mudhayur in Al-Haima. He fought during the siege in the Jarda area at the eastern entrance to Sanaa, and continued to do so until the siege ended. He graduated in his field with a promotion to the rank of major, and joined the War College in its tenth class in 1969, from which he obtained a bachelor's degree in military science in 1972. He received the military center course in Taiz, with a specialization in armored infantry, a diploma in public administration, and an honorary master's degree from the Higher Institute for Police Officers later in Sanaa. He worked as an officer in the Majd Brigade, then was appointed commander of a battalion, then commander of the fourteenth brigade in the Hajjah Brigade until 1974, then was appointed head of operations for the first Majd Brigade, then a chief of staff for this brigade, and then deputy commander of the Majd Brigade. After his younger brother Ali Abdullah Saleh took over the presidency, he was one of his most loyal supporters, and helped establish security and modernize the army and security forces in Taiz Governorate. He was appointed as an Undersecretary for the Ministry of Interior in 1978. He later joined the Police Training Center, which in 1980 became the Central Security Forces Command. He is considered its founder and put in lots of energy, effort and time until it became the most modern and largest military security unit. He was appointed deputy interior minister and commander of the Central Security and continued to serve in that role until the unification of Yemen in 1990. He left his post in the Ministry of the Interior in response to an agreement with the Yemeni Socialist Party, a partner in the government, and continued as leader of the Central Security Forces until he died. In the early 1990s, he started suffering from liver problems and had a liver transplant in 1993. In April 2001, the weekly Yemen Times reported that he was transferred to a hospital in Saudi Arabia after severe liver problems started to appear. In early May 2001, he was transferred to a hospital in London for emergency treatment after chronic liver problems started to appear, where he stayed until he died on 14 May. He had three children: Yahya, Tareq, and Ammar, who all served in the security forces of Ali Abdullah Saleh.

== Medals obtained ==
He has received several decorations, medals and certificates, including:

A certificate of appreciation and thanks during the siege of the seventy, Duty Medal, Honor, Championship Medal, Service Medal, Medal of Merit, Order of Unity, third degree.
