= Robert F. Worth =

American journalist and former chief of The New York Times Beirut bureau

- Born: September 29, 1965 (age 60); New York City, U.S.
- Occupation: Author
- Spouse: Alice Clapman
- Children: Isaac, Felix

Robert Forsyth Worth (born September 29, 1965) is an American author and journalist. He was the former chief of The New York Times Beirut bureau. He is the author of Rage for Order, which won the 2017 Lionel Gelber Prize.

== Life ==
Worth was born and raised in Manhattan, New York City. He has a PhD in English from Princeton University.

Worth became a New York Times reporter at the metropolitan desk in 2000. He was the Times correspondent in Baghdad from 2003 to 2006, and their Beirut bureau chief from 2007 until 2011. He has also contributed to The New York Review of Books.

From 2014 to 2015, he was a public policy fellow in the Middle East Program at the Woodrow Wilson International Center for Scholars while writing Rage for Order. While there, he worked on "The Arab Revolts and their Legacy" project.

== Awards and honors ==
He has been a two-time finalist for the National Magazine Award.

He won a silver medal in the 2017 Arthur Ross Book Award given by the Council on Foreign Relations for his book A Rage for Order.

Worth is a recipient of the Washington DC based Transatlantic Leadership Network "Freedom of the Media" Gold Medal award for Public Service, in 2023.

== Bibliography ==
- Robert F. Worth, "Syria's Lost Chance" (review of Elizabeth F. Thompson, How the West Stole Democracy from the Arabs: the Syrian Arab Congress of 1920 and the Destruction of Its Historic Liberal-Islamic Alliance, Atlantic Monthly, 466 pp.), The New York Review of Books, vol. LXVII, no. 15 (8 October 2020), pp. 31–33. Worth writes (p. 33): "Perhaps things would have been different if the Syrians had been left to govern themselves a century ago."
