= Tareq Saleh =

Yemeni military commander (born 1970)

Tareq Mohammed Abdullah Saleh
- طارق محمد عبد الله صالح
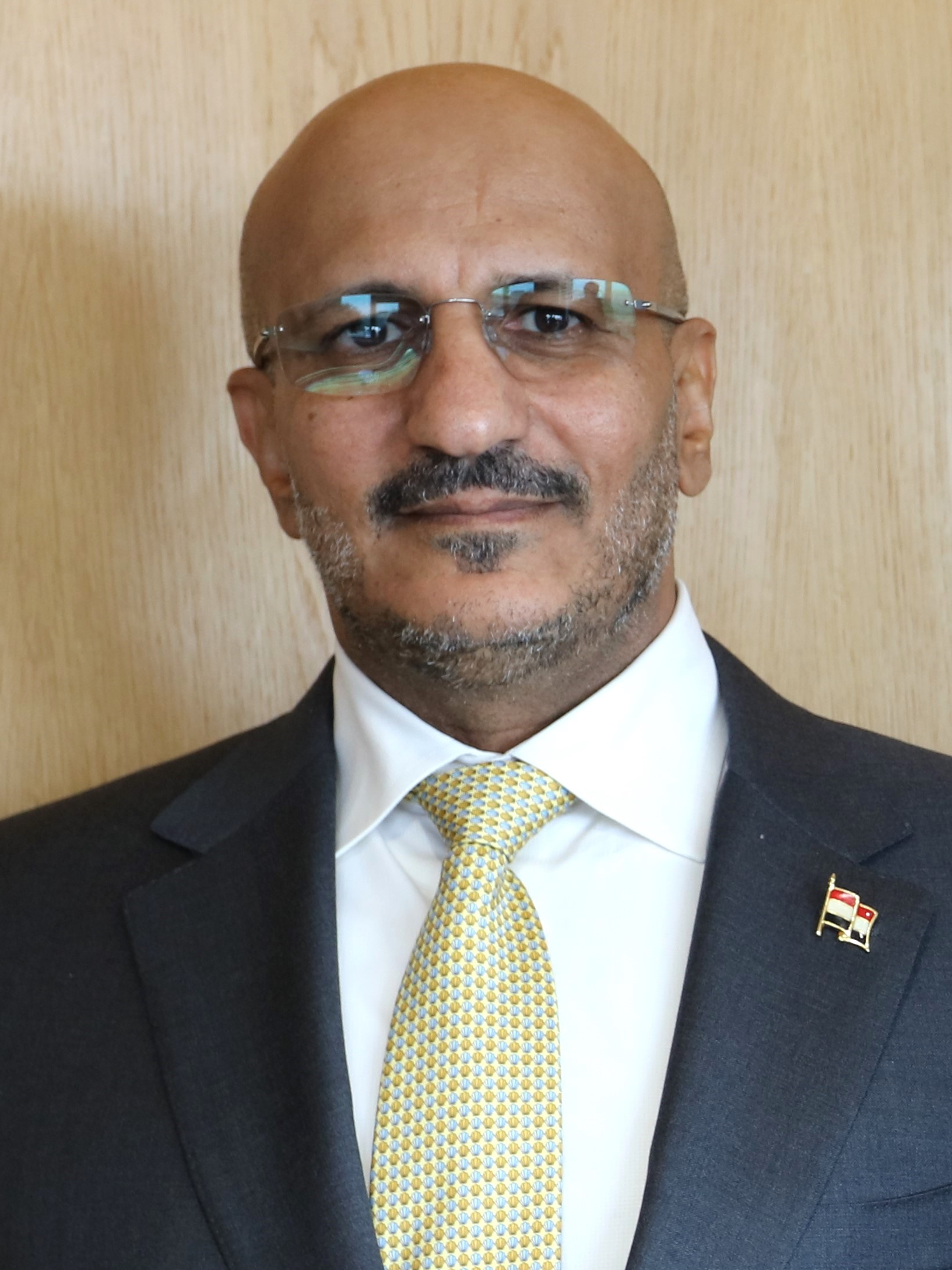
- Saleh in 2024

Deputy Chairman of the Presidential Leadership Council
- Incumbent
- Assumed office 7 April 2022

Personal details
- Born: 1970 (age 55–56) Sanaa, Yemen Arab Republic
- Children: Mubarak Saleh
- Parent: Mohammed Abdullah Saleh (father)
- Relatives: Yahya Saleh (brother); Ali Abdullah Saleh (uncle); Ahmed Saleh (cousin)
- Website: X

Military service
- Allegiance: Yemen
- Branch/service: Yemen Army
- Years of service: 1999 – present
- Rank: Brigadier general
- Commands: National Resistance; 2018–present Special Security Forces 2012–2017; Republican Guard; 2004–2012
- Battles/wars: Yemeni civil war (2014–present)

Tareq Mohammed Abdullah Saleh (Arabic: طارق محمد عبد الله صالح; born 1970) is a Yemeni military commander and the nephew of the late President Ali Abdullah Saleh. He is currently a member of the presidential council of Yemen. His father was Major-General Mohammed Abdullah Saleh.

Prior to the national crisis beginning in 2011, he headed the elite Presidential Guard. In 2012, he was ordered to stand down from this position. On 10 April 2013, he was appointed as a military attaché to Germany in an effort to remove the remnants of the previous regime. He re-emerged as a commander in the Houthi-Saleh alliance when the Yemeni Civil War broke out in 2015. When this alliance collapsed in 2017, Tareq Saleh commanded troops loyal to his uncle. Prior to the collapse of the pro-Saleh forces, the Saudi-owned Al Arabiya reported that negotiations were ongoing to form a military council in Saleh-held areas, which would have been headed by Tareq.

Following his uncle's death, reports emerged that the younger Saleh had also been killed. However, these were never confirmed, and Houthi forces launched a manhunt. Saleh evaded capture and eventually resurfaced in the Hadi loyalist-held Shabwah Governorate.
