= Yahya Mohamed Abdullah Saleh =

Yemeni brigadier general

- يحيى محمد عبد الله صالح
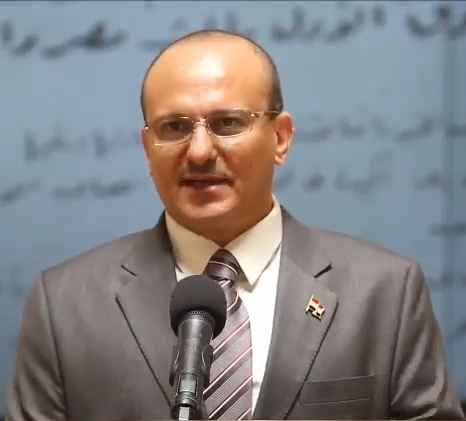
- Saleh in 2017
- Born: December 17, 1965 (age 60); Sanaa, Yemen Arab Republic
- Relatives: Mohammed Abdullah Saleh (father); Tareq Saleh (brother); Ali Abdullah Saleh (uncle); Ahmed Saleh (cousin)
- Military career
- Allegiance: Yemen
- Service years: 2001 - 21 May 2012
- Rank: Brigadier general
- Commands: Central Security Organization
- Conflicts: Houthi insurgency in Yemen; Yemeni revolution
- Website: www.yahya.saleh.name

Yahya Mohamed Abdullah Saleh is the nephew of former Yemeni president Ali Abdullah Saleh, and was a chair staff of the approx. 50,000 strong Central Security Organization from 2001 to 21 May 2012. His father was Major General Mohammed Abdullah Saleh. Saleh was replaced with Major General Fadhel Bin Yahiya al-Qusi.

Following his dismissal Yahya sent a letter to President Abdrabbuh Mansur Hadi, expressing his support for Hadi.
