= Republican Guard (Yemen) =

Yemeni Army unit

Yemeni Republican Guard
- Republican Guard of North Yemen: 1964–1990; Republican Guard of Yemen: 1990–present
- Republican Guard shoulder sleeve insignia
- Active: 1964–present
- Country: North Yemen (1964–1990); Yemen (1990–present)
- Branch: Yemen Army
- Type: Praetorian Guard; Special operations force
- Role: Praetorian Guard; Mechanized infantry Armoured warfare Counter-Terrorism
- Size: 100,000–150,000
- Part of: 1 Mountain Infantry Brigade; 1 Artillery Brigade; Special Security Forces; Counterterrorism brigades 3 missile brigades 2 Armoured Brigades; 1 Protective Brigade; 1 Special Guard Brigade
- Engagements: Yemeni Revolution; Battle of Sana'a; Battle of Radda; Yemeni Civil War (2014–present); Saudi-led intervention in the Yemeni civil war; Houthi–Saudi Arabian conflict

Commanders
- Notable commanders: Maj. Gen. Ali al-Jayfi †; Brig. Gen. Ahmed Saleh; Col. Ali Raymi †

Insignia
- Unit flag

The Yemeni Republican Guard (YRG; Arabic: الحرس الجمهوري اليمني, romanized: al-Ḥaras al-Jumhūrī al-Yamanī), formerly known as the Strategic Reserve Forces (Arabic: قوات الاحتياطي الاستراتيجي, romanized: Qūwāt al-Iḥtiyāṭī al-Istirātījī), is a former elite praetorian guard unit in the Yemen Army. It was commanded by the former President Ali Abdullah Saleh's son Ahmed Saleh, and most notably involved in the Yemeni Revolution of 2011, fighting in favour of the Saleh government.

The YRG was traditionally relied on as the backbone of Saleh's regime, and was the best armed and trained in the armed forces. Yemen's Defence Ministry both overlooked and engaged in corruption with the YRG in order to ensure the loyalty of the unit's leadership.

== History ==
The Republican Guard was raised in 1964 by Yemen's Republican and Nasserist regime based on the Egyptian Republican Guard model of a powerful, heavily armored formation defending the capital city against internal threats. The Guard was initially created and trained by Egyptian and Soviet advisors. The Guard was supposed to be a symbol of the Republican State. Recruits were mostly drawn from the Hajjah and 'Amran Governorates. Each Battalion had a Chief Political Commissar with a deputy in every company, squadron and battery for political education of troops. The commissar was responsible only to the Brigade Commander and not to the Battalion commander.

=== Role in the 2011-2012 Yemeni revolution ===
On 15 October 2011, Al Arabiya, quoting defected General Ali Mohsen al-Ahmar, reported that 7,000 members of the Republican Guard and other security units had defected to the Yemeni opposition.

On November 21, anti-government forces stormed a Republican Guard barracks situated in Nahm, a town 70 km northeast of the capital Sana'a. The barracks attacked was used by the 63rd Mountain Infantry Brigade of the Republican Guard. Planes loyal to the regime of Saleh launched several retaliatory strikes against the anti-government forces, who returned anti-aircraft fire using captured base equipment.

=== Post revolution ===
Although the Republican Guard under Saleh was counted as one of the most loyal units of the Yemeni Army, the unit has been less reliable for his successor due to parts of it still being commanded by Saleh loyalists. This has led to conflict in the unit between Saleh loyalists and loyalists to the new government.

Following an attempt by the new President Abdrabbuh Mansur Hadi to replace the leader of the 3rd Republican Guard Brigade, Tareq Saleh, Saleh led a 65-day mutiny. The mutiny was eventually brought to an end on June 7 after other Republican Guard Brigades managed to disarm the mutinous Brigade. Saleh subsequently relinquished his command and control of the 3rd Brigade, which is regarded as one of the strongest and best equipped brigades in the military, was taken over by General Abdulrahman al-Halili.

Another Saleh loyalist, Brigadier General Murad al-Awbali, commander of the 62nd brigade, was abducted by soldiers in the unit after withholding pay from those who had broken ranks with the former president Saleh. Awbali's release was later secured by tribal officials.

In an effort to try to curb the power of Brig. Gen. Ahmed Saleh, President Hadi announced a restructuring of the Armed Forces in early August 2012. The restructuring particularly hit the strong Republican Guard, and will see units moved from both the Republican Guard and other units to a new force known as the Presidential Defence Forces, which will be under the direct control of the president. In reaction to these attempts at restructuring, 200 armed members of the Republican Guard protested outside the Defense Ministry, leading to troops being deployed due to concern that the armed protesters might attempt to storm the building.

After the former President Ali Abdullah Saleh's death in 2017, Republican Guard forces started fighting against the Houthis, capturing part of Al Hudaydah City. The Yemeni Republican Guard and the central security forces have joined to form the National Resistance Forces, which is Tareq Saleh's private army. They are highly experienced veterans and are reportedly the best equipped and trained forces in the Yemeni-Saudi coalition.

== Strength ==
30,000 to 100,000 men commanded by Brigadier Ahmed Saleh.

== Organization ==
The RG command structure in April 2012 The Republican Guard consists of 20 Brigades:

- 1st Brigade (Special Guard)
- 1st Artillery Brigade (SCUD Missile)
- 2nd Mountain Infantry Brigade
- 3rd Mountain Infantry Brigade
- 3rd Armoured Brigade
- 4th Artillery Brigade (Field)
- 7th Infantry Brigade
- 9th Mechanized Infantry Brigade
- 14th Armored Brigade
- 22nd Armored Brigade
- 26th Artillery Brigade (Rocket)
- 33rd Armored Brigade
- 55th Special Forces ' Brigade
- 61st Artillery Brigade (Self-Propelled)
- 62nd Mountain Infantry Brigade
- 63rd Mechanized Infantry Brigade
- 72nd Infantry Brigade
- 83rd Artillery Brigade (Field)
- 101st Mountain Infantry Brigade
- 102nd Mountain Infantry Brigade

This organization was changed in 2015, just before the outbreak of the Yemeni Civil War.

== See also ==
- Homeland Shield Forces
- National Resistance Forces
- Republican guard
