= Special Security Forces (Yemen) =

Paramilitary force in Yemen

Special Security Forces قوات الأمن الخاصة Quwwatul Amn al-Khasah
- Emblem

- Flag

Agency overview
- Formed: 1980
- Preceding agency: Central Security Organization (1980–2013)
- Employees: ~50,000 (2008)

Jurisdictional structure
- Operations jurisdiction: Yemen

Operational structure
- Elected officer responsible: Ibrahim Haidan, Minister of the Interior
- Agency executive: Gen. Mohammed Mansour al-Ghadra, Chief-of-Staff
- Parent agency: Ministry of Interior

Notables
- Significant Engagements: Al-Qaeda insurgency in Yemen; Yemeni revolution; Yemeni crisis

The Special Security Forces (Arabic: قوات الأمن الخاصة, romanized: Quwwatul Amn al-Khasah), formerly known until 2013 as the Central Security Organization (Arabic: قوات الأمن المركزي, romanized: Quwwatul Amn al-Markazi), is a gendarmerie and paramilitary force in Yemen under the control of the Minister of the Interior and forms a key part of the Yemeni security establishment. The force was some 50,000 strong as of 2008, before the Yemeni crisis began, and SSF units are equipped with a range of infantry weapons and armored personnel carriers. The force also has its own extrajudicial detention facilities.

== History ==
Former flag of the Central Security Organization

The CSO was founded as part of Yemen's efforts to combat al-Qaeda.

Its first Chief of Staff was Mohammed Abdullah Saleh.

He was succeeded by his son, Yahya Saleh, after his death in 2001. Under Yahya, the CSO became stronger, better paid, and better equipped. Yahya also oversaw the formation of the CTU, which was established with funding and training from the United States.

Within hours of the 2012 Sana'a bombing, an attack by Ansar al-Sharia on units of the CSF, Yahya Saleh was dismissed by President Abdrabbuh Mansur Hadi through presidential decree. Major General Fadhel Bin Yahiya al-Qusi replaced Saleh as the CSO's Chief of Staff.

The Central Security Organization was renamed as the Special Security Forces following a presidential decree on 21 February 2013.

On 8 September 2014 President Hadi relieved General Fadhel Bin Yahiya al-Qusi of his command of the SSF, and appointed General Mohammed Mansour al-Ghadra in his place.

== Structure ==
Although nominally part of the Interior Ministry, the CSO under Yahya was largely autonomous, and is composed of two main parts; the Central Security Forces (CSF) and the Counter-Terrorism Unit (CTU).

The CSF are paramilitary police that secure official buildings and infrastructure, as well as managing the dense network of security checkpoints on Yemen's highways. The CSF is also beginning to undertake covert countersurveillance at likely terrorist targets.

In contrast, CTU is a far smaller force, comprising a 150-strong special forces unit that has been successful in undertaking raids throughout the country since 2003.

== Criticisms ==
Human Rights Watch has criticised the CSO, claiming that the organisation utilizes child soldiers and subjects Yemenis to arbitrary detention. Human Rights Watch has also alleged that CSF units deployed nearby had failed to prevent a killing spree carried out by pro-Saleh snipers on protesters in Sana'a on 18 March 2011, during the Yemeni revolution.
