= Elections in Yemen =

Elections in Yemen take place within the framework of a semi-presidential system, with both the President and House of Representatives elected by the public. Due to political instability, elections have not been held regularly since the early 2000s.

== Electoral history ==
=== North Yemen ===
Following the North Yemen Civil War and the establishment of the Yemen Arab Republic, a new constitution came into force in 1970 and the first parliamentary elections were held in 1971. However, as political parties were banned, all candidates ran as independents. Political instability meant that the next elections did not take place until 1988. The 1988 elections were also held on a non-party basis, although around 30 candidates sympathetic to the Muslim Brotherhood were elected.

=== South Yemen ===
During the British colonial era, elections were held for a Legislative Council in the Colony of Aden. The first took place in 1955, although only four of the 18 seats were suffrage was restricted. The next elections in 1959 saw 12 of the 23 seats elected, although continued restrictions on suffrage led to only 21,500 people being registered to vote from a population of 180,000. The final elections of the British era were held in 1964, having been postponed from 1962.

After independence and the establishment of the People's Democratic Republic of Yemen in 1967, the first parliamentary elections took place in 1978, by which time the country was a one-party state. The Yemeni Socialist Party (YSP) won all 111 seats. The next elections were scheduled for 1983, but postponed until 1986. The YSP remained the sole legal party, but independents were allowed to run, winning 40 of the 111 seats.

=== Unified Yemen ===
Following unification in 1990, a 301-seat House of Representatives was established. Parliamentary elections were held in 1993, which saw the General People's Congress (GPC) based in the north win 123 of the 301 seats, whilst al-Islah won 62 and the YSP 56. The YSP subsequently boycotted the 1997 parliamentary elections, in which the GPC won a majority of seats.

The first direct presidential elections were held in 1999. Candidates could only advance to the public vote if they received over 30 votes in the House of Representatives. With only the GPC and al-Islah holding enough seats to nominate a candidate, and al-Islah backing incumbent President Ali Abdullah Saleh, the only other candidate to receive enough votes was the GPC's Najeeb Qahtan Al-Sha'abi. Saleh subsequently won the public ballot with 96.2% of the vote. The next parliamentary elections in 2003 saw the YSP return to electoral contests. However, they won only eight seats as the GPC increased their parliamentary majority, winning 226 of the 301 seats.

The 2006 presidential elections saw Saleh re-elected with 77% of the vote, defeating Faisal Bin Shamlan, the candidate of the Joint Meeting Parties, an alliance of the five main opposition parties. The parliamentary elections scheduled for 2009 were repeatedly postponed. However, following the Yemeni revolution, Saleh stood down and presidential elections were held in 2012. Saleh's Vice President Abd Rabbuh Mansur Hadi was the only candidate to run, and was elected unopposed.

=== Latest elections ===
==== 2012 presidential election ====
| Candidate | Party | Votes | % |
|---|---|---|---|
| Abdrabbuh Mansur Hadi | General People's Congress | 6,621,921 | 100.00 |
| Total | | 6,621,921 | 100.00 |
| Valid votes | | 6,621,921 | 99.80 |
| Invalid/blank votes | | 13,271 | 0.20 |
| Total votes | | 6,635,192 | 100.00 |
| Registered voters/turnout | | 10,243,364 | 64.78 |
Source: IFES

==== 2003 parliamentary election ====
| Party | Votes | % | Seats | +/– |
|---|---|---|---|---|
| General People's Congress | 3,465,117 | 57.79 | 229 | +42 |
| Al-Islah | 1,349,485 | 22.51 | 45 | –8 |
| Yemeni Socialist Party | 291,541 | 4.86 | 7 | New |
| Nasserist Unionist People's Organisation | 109,714 | 1.83 | 3 | 0 |
| Arab Socialist Ba'ath Party | 40,872 | 0.68 | 2 | 0 |
| General People's Congress–Al-Islah | 25,352 | 0.42 | 1 | New |
| National Arab Socialist Ba'ath Party | 23,745 | 0.40 | 0 | 0 |
| Nasserist Reform Organisation | 15,257 | 0.25 | 0 | 0 |
| Union of Popular Forces | 11,967 | 0.20 | 0 | – |
| Democratic Nasserist Party | 9,829 | 0.16 | 0 | 0 |
| National Democratic Front | 7,056 | 0.12 | 0 | – |
| Social Nationalist Party – Yemen | 5,349 | 0.09 | 0 | – |
| Party of Truth | 4,585 | 0.08 | 0 | 0 |
| People's Democratic Party | 4,077 | 0.07 | 0 | – |
| Democratic Union of Popular Forces | 3,003 | 0.05 | 0 | – |
| Social Green Party | 2,276 | 0.04 | 0 | – |
| Popular Unity Party | 1,739 | 0.03 | 0 | – |
| Yemeni League Party | 1,383 | 0.02 | 0 | – |
| Liberation Front Party | 1,282 | 0.02 | 0 | – |
| Popular Unionist Liberation Party | 1,241 | 0.02 | 0 | – |
| Yemeni Unionist Gathering | 483 | 0.01 | 0 | – |
| Democratic September Organization | 81 | 0.00 | 0 | – |
| Independents | 620,615 | 10.35 | 14 | –40 |
| Total | 5,996,049 | 100.00 | 301 | 0 |
| Valid votes | 5,996,049 | 96.69 | | |
| Invalid/blank votes | 205,205 | 3.31 | | |
| Total votes | 6,201,254 | 100.00 | | |
| Registered voters/turnout | 8,097,514 | 76.58 | | |
Source: Yemen NIC

== Electoral system ==
The president is elected for a seven-year term in a two-stage process, with the House of Representatives required to endorse at least two candidates, who are then put to a public vote. The 301 members of the House of Representatives are elected for a six-year term in single-member constituencies using the first-past-the-post system.

The voting age is 18, whilst candidates for the House of Representatives must be at least 25.

== Referendums ==
Following unification in 1990, a referendum was held on a new constitution in 1991, which was approved by 98.5% of voters. Another constitutional referendum in 2001 saw 77% of voters approve changes to the constitution.
