= Next Yemeni parliamentary election =

Cancelled election in Yemen

- TBD
- All 301 seats in the House of Representatives; 151 seats needed for a majority
Party	Leader	Vote %	Seats	+/–
GPC	Disputed			
Al-Islah	Mohammed al-Yadoumi			
YSP	Abdul Rahman al-Saqqaf			
NUPO	Abdulmalik Al-Mekhlafi			
Ba'ath Party	Qasim Salaam			
Independents	–			
This lists parties that won seats. See the complete results below.
Prime Minister before
Shaya al-Zindani (disputed); Independent

Parliamentary elections have not been held in Yemen since 2003. The term of the House of Representatives is six years, and the last elections were in 2003. The next elections were originally set for 27 April 2009, but President Ali Abdullah Saleh postponed them by two years on 24 February 2009, claiming the threat of an electoral boycott by a coalition of opposition parties called the Joint Meeting Parties (JMP). The elections did not take place on 27 April 2011, and were planned to be held alongside the next presidential election.

A special presidential election was held in 2012 following the Yemeni Revolution, the President Saleh was resigned, and the election leading to the inauguration of Abdrabbuh Mansour Hadi as the new President of the Republic.

In January 2014, the final session of the National Dialogue Conference (NDC) announced that elections had been delayed and would occur within 9 months of a referendum on a new constitution that had not yet been drafted. However, both the General People's Congress and Houthi representatives on the National Authority for Monitoring the Implementation of NDC Outcomes have refused to vote on the new constitution drafted by the constitution drafting committee, which was submitted in January 2015. The Yemeni civil war began in September 2014.

The President Hadi resigned on April 7, 2022, after transferring his presidential powers to the Presidential Leadership Council (PLC), an eight-member body. The PLC officially assumed power on April 17, 2022. The chairman of the PLC, Rashad al-Alimi, became the new President of the Republic of Yemen.
