= Modern history of Yemen =

Period of Yemeni history

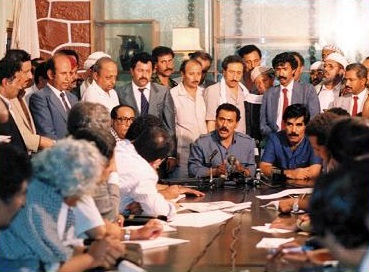
North Yemeni president, Ali Abdullah Saleh, with the Secretary-General of the Yemeni Socialist Party, Ali Salem al-Beidh, signing the unity agreement on 30 November 1989.

The modern history of Yemen began with the withdrawal of the Ottoman Empire. In 1839 the British set up a protective area around the southern port of Aden and in 1918 the northern Kingdom of Yemen gained independence from the Ottoman Empire. North Yemen became a republic in 1962, but it was not until 1967 that the British Empire withdrew from what became South Yemen. In 1970, the southern government adopted a communist governmental system. The two countries were officially united as the Republic of Yemen on May 22, 1990.

== North Yemen ==
=== Kingdom ===
The Mutawakkilite Kingdom of Yemen, established in 1918, was an autocratic, theocratic state governed under an absolute monarchy. The majority of the population spoke Arabic, with a minority speaking Yemenite Hebrew. Religiously, approximately 55% of the population were Zaydi Muslims, 45% Sunni Muslims, and a small portion were historically Jewish.

Following Imam Yahya's assassination in 1948, his son Ahmad bin Yahya ascended the throne. In 1958, Yemen joined the United Arab States under pressure from Egyptian President Gamal Abdel Nasser. However, after Syria's departure from the union in 1961, Yemen also withdrew. The monarchy was eventually overthrown in 1962 following a coup led by Abdullah al-Sallal, supported by Egypt, resulting in the establishment of the Yemen Arab Republic.

=== Republic ===
Shortly after assuming power in 1962, Ahmad's son, the Imam Muhammad al-Badr was deposed by revolutionary forces, who took control of Sana'a and created the Yemen Arab Republic (YAR). Egypt assisted the YAR with troops and supplies to combat forces loyal to the Kingdom. Saudi Arabia and Jordan supported Badr's royalist forces to oppose the newly formed republic starting the North Yemen Civil War. Conflict continued periodically until 1967 when Egyptian troops were withdrawn. By 1968, following a final royalist siege of Sana'a, most of the opposing leaders reached a reconciliation and Saudi Arabia recognized the Republic in 1970.

== South Yemen ==
=== British domain, Colony of Aden and Aden protectorate ===
British interests in the area which would later become South Yemen, began to grow when in 1839, British East India Company forces captured the port of Aden, to provide a coaling station for ships en route to India. The colony, known as the Aden Settlement, gained much political and strategic importance after the opening of the Suez Canal in 1869.

Aden was ruled as part of British India until 1937, when the city of Aden became the Colony of Aden, a crown colony in its own right. The Aden hinterland and Hadhramaut to the east formed the remainder of what would become South Yemen and was not administered directly by Aden but were tied to Britain by treaties of protection. Starting in the latter decades of the 19th century and continuing into the 20th century, Britain signed agreements with local rulers of traditional polities that, together, became known as the Aden Protectorate. The area was divided into numerous sultanates, emirates, and sheikhdoms, and was divided for administrative purposes into the East Aden Protectorate and the West Aden Protectorate. The eastern protectorate consisted of the three Hadhramaut states (Qu'aiti State of Shihr and Mukalla, Kathiri State of Seiyun, Mahra Sultanate of Qishn and Socotra) with the remaining states comprising the west. Economic development was largely centred in Aden, and while the city flourished partly due to the discovery of crude oil on the Arabian Peninsula in the 1930s, the states of the Aden Protectorate stagnated.

Encouraged by the rhetoric of President Nasser of Egypt against British colonial rule in the Middle East, pressure for the British to leave grew. Following Nasser's creation of the United Arab Republic, attempts to incorporate Yemen in turn threatened Aden and the Protectorate. To counter this, the British attempted to unite the various states under its protection and, on 11 February 1959, six of the West Aden Protectorate states formed the Federation of Arab Emirates of the South to which nine other states were subsequently added. During the 1960s, the British sought to incorporate all of the Aden Protectorate territories into the Federation. On 18 January 1963, the Colony of Aden was incorporated against the wishes of much of the city's populace as the State of Aden and the Federation was renamed the Federation of South Arabia. Several more states subsequently joined the Federation and the remaining states that declined to join, mainly in Hadhramaut, formed the Protectorate of South Arabia.

In 1963, fighting between Egyptian forces and British-led Saudi-financed guerrillas in the Yemen Arab Republic spread to South Arabia with the formation of the National Liberation Front (NLF), who hoped to force the British out of South Arabia. Hostilities started with a grenade attack by the NLF against the British High Commissioner on 10 December 1963, killing one person and injuring fifty, and a state of emergency was declared, becoming known as the Aden Emergency.

In 1964, the new British government under Harold Wilson announced their intention to hand over power to the Federation of South Arabia in 1968, but that the British military would remain. There were around 280 guerrilla attacks in 1964, and over 500 in 1965. In 1966, the British Government announced that all British forces would be withdrawn at independence. In response, the security situation deteriorated with the creation of the socialist Front for the Liberation of Occupied South Yemen (FLOSY) which started to attack the NLF in a bid for power, as well as attacking the British.

In January 1967, there were mass riots by NLF and FLOSY supporters in the old Arab quarter of Aden town, which continued until mid February, despite the intervention of British troops. During the period there were many attacks on the troops, and an Aden Airways Douglas DC-3 plane was destroyed in the air with no survivors. At the same time, the members of FLOSY and the NLF were also killing each other in large numbers.

The temporary closure of the Suez Canal in 1967 effectively negated the last reason that British had kept hold of the colonies in Yemen, and, in the face of uncontrollable violence, they began to withdraw.

On 20 June 1967, there was a mutiny in the Federation of South Arabia Army, which also spread to the police. Order was restored by the British, mainly due to the efforts of the 1st Battalion Argyll and Sutherland Highlanders, under the command of Lt-Col. Colin Mitchell.

=== People's Democratic Republic of Yemen (1967–1990) ===
The British pulled out on 30 November 1967, leaving Aden under NLF control. The Royal Marines, who had been the first British troops to occupy Aden in 1839, were the last to leave. The Federation of South Arabia collapsed, and Southern Yemen became independent as the People's Republic of South Yemen. The NLF, with the support of the army, attained total control of the new state after defeating the FLOSY and the states of the former Federation in a drawn out campaign of terror.

In June 1969, a Marxist wing of the NLF gained power and changed the country's name to the People's Democratic Republic of Yemen (PDRY) on 1 December 1970. In the PDRY, all political parties were amalgamated into the Yemeni Socialist Party (YSP), which became the only legal party. The PDRY established close ties with the Soviet Union, the People's Republic of China, Cuba, and Palestine.

These major communist powers assisted in the building of the PDRY's armed forces. Strong support from Moscow resulted in the Soviet Navy gaining access to naval facilities in South Yemen.

== Relations between North Yemen and South Yemen ==
=== 1972 conflict ===
Although the governments of the PDRY and the YAR declared that they approved a future union in 1972, little progress was made toward unification, and relations were often strained. A declaration was made in 1972 that unification would eventually occur. However, fighting erupted between North Yemen and South Yemen in October of that year; North Yemen was supplied by Saudi Arabia and South Yemen by the USSR. The fighting was short-lived, and led to the Cairo Agreement of October 28, 1972, which put forward a plan to unify the two countries.

=== 1979 conflict ===
Fighting broke out again in February and March 1979, with South Yemen allegedly supplying aid to rebels in the north through the National Democratic Front and crossing the border. Southern forces made it as far as the city of Taizz before withdrawing. This conflict was also short-lived. The war was only stopped by an Arab League intervention. The goal of unity was reaffirmed by the northern and southern heads of state during a summit meeting in Kuwait in March 1979.

What the PDRY government failed to tell the YAR government was that it wished to be the dominant power in any unification, and left wing rebels in North Yemen began to receive extensive funding and arms from South Yemen.

=== 1980s ===
In 1980, PDRY president Abdul Fattah Ismail resigned and went into exile. His successor, Ali Nasir Muhammad, took a less interventionist stance toward both North Yemen and neighbouring Oman.

==== South Yemen Civil War ====
On January 13, 1986, a civil war broke out in Aden between Ali Nasir's supporters and supporters of the returned Ismail, who wanted power back. Fighting lasted for more than a month and resulted in thousands of casualties, Ali Nasir's ousting, and Ismail's death. Some 60,000 people, including the deposed Ali Nasir, fled to the YAR.

=== Unification talks (1988-1990) ===
In May 1988, the YAR and PDRY governments came to an understanding that considerably reduced tensions including agreement to renew discussions concerning unification, to establish a joint oil exploration area along their undefined border, to demilitarize the border, and to allow Yemenis unrestricted border passage on the basis of only a national identification card.

In November 1989, the leaders of the YAR (Ali Abdullah Saleh) and the PDRY (Ali Salem al-Beidh) agreed on a draft unity constitution originally drawn up in 1981.

Efforts toward unification proceeded from 1988 and, on May 22, 1990, the Republic of Yemen's independence was declared.

== Republic of Yemen ==
=== Unification and transitional period ===
The Republic of Yemen (ROY) was declared on 22 May 1990 with Saleh becoming president and al-Beidh Vice President. For the first time in centuries, much of geographical Greater Yemen was politically united.

A 30-month transitional period for completing the unification of the two political and economic systems was set. A presidential council was jointly elected by the 26-member YAR advisory council and the 17-member PDRY presidium. The presidential council appointed a Prime Minister, who formed a Cabinet. There was also a 301-seat provisional unified parliament, consisting of 159 members from the north, 111 members from the south, and 31 independent members appointed by the chairman of the council.

A unity constitution was agreed upon in May 1990 and ratified by the populace in May 1991. It affirmed Yemen's commitment to free elections, a multiparty political system, the right to own private property, equality under the law, and respect of basic human rights. Parliamentary elections were held on 27 April 1993. International groups assisted in the organization of the elections and observed actual balloting. The resulting Parliament included 143 GPC, 69 YSP, 63 Islaah (Yemeni grouping for reform, a party composed of various tribal and religious groups), 6 Baathis, 3 Nasserists, 2 Al Haq, and 15 independents.

Islaah was invited into the ruling coalition, and the presidential council was altered to include one Islaah member. Conflicts within the coalition resulted in the self-imposed exile of Vice President Ali Salem Al-Bidh to Aden beginning in August 1993 and a deterioration in the general security situation as political rivals settled scores and tribal elements took advantage of the unsettled situation.

=== 1994 civil war ===
Haydar Abu Bakr Al-Attas, the former PDRY Prime Minister continued to serve as the ROY Prime Minister, but his government was ineffective due to political infighting. Continuous negotiations between northern and southern leaders resulted in the signing of the document of pledge and accord in Amman, Jordan on 20 February 1994. Despite this, clashes intensified until civil war broke out in early May 1994.

Almost all of the actual fighting in the 1994 civil war occurred in the southern part of the country despite air and missile attacks against cities and major installations in the north. The United States strongly supported stopping the war and called for a cease-fire and a return to the negotiating table. Various attempts, including by a UN special envoy, were unsuccessful to effect a cease-fire.

Southern leaders declared secession and the establishment of the Democratic Republic of Yemen (DRY) on 21 May 1994, but the DRY was not recognized by the international community. Ali Nasir Muhammad supporters greatly assisted military operations against the secessionists and Aden was occupied on 7 July 1994. Other resistance quickly collapsed and thousands of southern leaders and military went into exile.

Early during the fighting, President Ali Abdallah Salih announced a general amnesty which applied to everyone except a list of 16 persons. Most southerners returned to Yemen after a short exile. An armed opposition was announced from Saudi Arabia, but no significant incidents within Yemen materialized. The government prepared legal cases against four southern leaders--Ali Salem al-Beidh, Haydar Abu Bakr Al-Attas, Abd Al-Rahman Ali Al-Jifri, and Salih Munassar Al-Siyali—for misappropriation of official funds. Others on the list of 16 were told informally they could return to take advantage of the amnesty, but most remained outside Yemen. Although many of Ali Nasir Muhammad's followers were appointed to senior governmental positions (including Vice President, Chief of Staff, and Governor of Aden), Ali Nasir Muhammad himself remained abroad in Syria.

=== Mid 1990s ===
==== 1994 Constitutional Amendments and Presidential Election ====
In 1994, Yemen amended its unity constitution, abolishing the Presidential Council and establishing a system where the President would be elected by Parliament. Subsequently, on 1 October 1994, President Ali Abdullah Saleh was elected by Parliament to a five-year term.

==== 1997 Parliamentary Elections ====
Yemen conducted its second multiparty parliamentary elections in April 1997. The General People's Congress, led by President Saleh, secured a significant majority, consolidating its political influence. These elections were part of Yemen's ongoing efforts to establish a democratic political system following unification.

==== 1999 Presidential Election ====
The first direct presidential election in Yemen took place on 13 September 1999. President Ali Abdullah Saleh was elected to a seven-year term, receiving 96.2% of the vote. His sole opponent, Najeeb Qahtan al-Shaabi, an independent candidate and son of South Yemen's former president, garnered 3.8% of the vote.

=== 2000s ===
On October 12, 2000, the USS Cole - an American guided missile destroyer - was attacked by waterborne terrorists as the American ship was refueling in the port of Aden. Two suicide bombers approached the Cole in a small boat loaded with explosives. Once alongside the ship, the men detonated the explosives, killing themselves and 17 American sailors. It was later determined the bombers were part of Osama bin Laden's Al-Qaida terrorist network.

Constitutional amendments adopted in the summer of 2000 extended the presidential term by 2 years, thus moving the next presidential elections to 2006. The amendments also extended the parliamentary term of office to a 6-year term, thus moving elections for these seats to 2003. On 20 February 2001, a new constitutional amendment created a bicameral legislature, the Assembly of Representatives of Yemen, consisting of a Shura Council (111 seats; members appointed by the president) and a House of Representatives (301 seats; members elected by popular vote).

In the 2000s the government has been fighting rebel groups such as the one led by Hussein al-Houthi's Zaydi movement Shabab al-Mu'mineen, "The Young Believers".

=== 2011 Yemeni Revolution and subsequent crisis ===
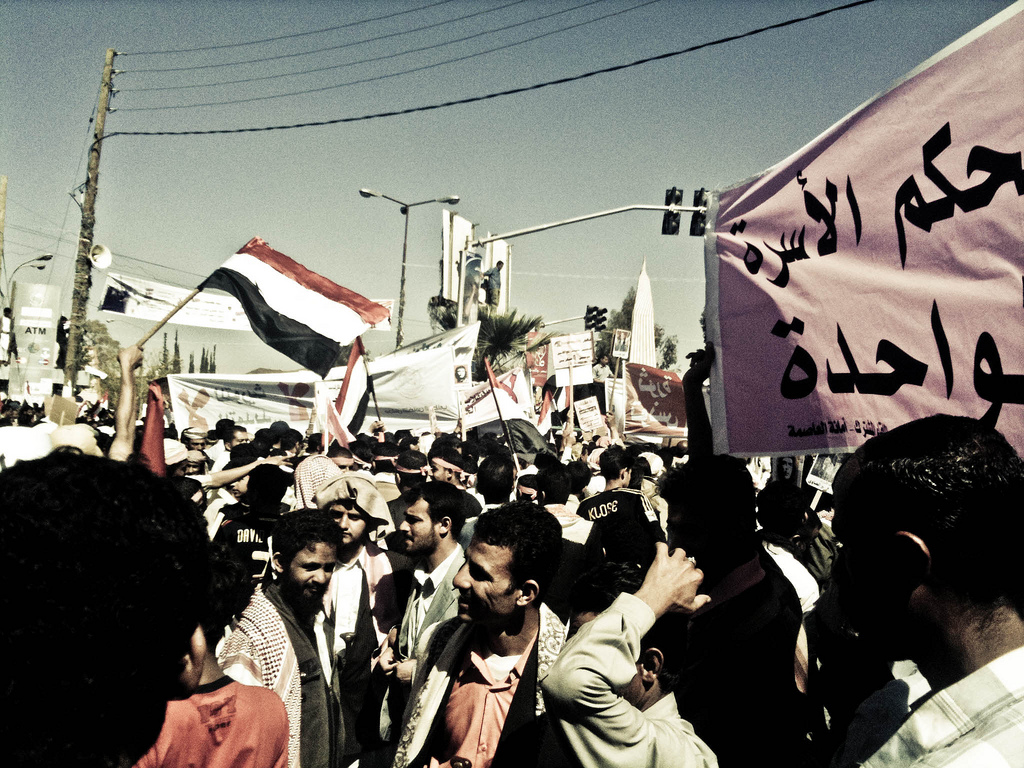
Protesters in Sana'a on 3 February.

The 2011 Yemeni protests followed the initial stages of the Tunisian revolution and occurred simultaneously with the Egyptian Revolution and other mass protests in the Arab world in early 2011. The protests were initially against unemployment, economic conditions and corruption, as well as against the government's proposals to modify the constitution of Yemen. The protestors' demands then escalated to calls for President Ali Abdullah Saleh to resign.

A major demonstration of over 16,000 protestors took place in Sana'a on 27 January. On 2 February, President Saleh announced he would not run for reelection in 2013 and that he would not pass power to his son. On 3 February, 20,000 people protested against the government in Sana'a, others protested in Aden, in a "Day of Rage" called for by Tawakel Karman, while soldiers, armed members of the General People's Congress and many protestors held a pro-government rally in Sana'a. In a "Friday of Anger" on 18 February, tens of thousands of Yemenis took part in anti-government demonstrations in Taiz, Sana'a and Aden. On a "Friday of No Return" on 11 March, protestors called for the ousting of Saleh in Sana'a where three people were killed. More protests were held in other cities, including Mukalla, where one person was killed. On 18 March, protesters in Sana'a were fired upon resulting in over 40 deaths and ultimately culminating in mass defections and resignations.

On 23 April Saleh accepted a proposal to step down and shift control to his deputy after thirty days. The agreement included immunity for him and his family and further required the opposition to stop public protests and join a coalition with Saleh's ruling party. Reactions to Saleh's acceptance have been reserved, without the agreement formalized or accepted by both sides and with the possibility of the stand-off continuing.

On 22 May Saleh had agreed to the deal only to back away hours before the scheduled signing for the third time. On 23 May Sheikh Sadiq al-Ahmar, the head of the Hashid tribal federation, one of the most powerful tribes in the country, declared support for the opposition and his armed supporters came into conflict with loyalist security forces in the capital Sana'a. Heavy street fighting ensued, which included artillery and mortar shelling.

Saleh and several others were injured and at least five people were killed by a 3 June rocket attack on the presidential compound when ordnance struck a mosque used by high-level government officials for prayer services. The next day, Vice President Abd al-Rab Mansur al-Hadi took over as acting president while Saleh flew to Saudi Arabia to be treated. As Saleh flew to the Saudi capital of Riyadh for surgery on 4 June, a cease-fire was brokered by Saudi Arabia's King Abdullah.

In early July the government had repeatedly rejected the opposition's demands, including the formation of a transitional council with the goal of formally transferring power from the current administration to a caretaker government intended to oversee Yemen's first-ever democratic elections. In response, factions of the opposition announced the formation of their own 17-member transitional council on 16 July, though the Joint Meeting Parties that have functioned as an umbrella for many of the Yemeni opposition groups during the uprising said the council did not represent them and did not match their "plan" for the country.

== Post Yemeni Revolution (2011-Present) ==
=== Transition of power and political challenges ===
Following President Ali Abdullah Saleh's departure in early 2012, his vice president, Abd-Rabbu Mansour Hadi, assumed leadership amid expectations of democratic reforms. However, Hadi's administration struggled with internal divisions, economic challenges, and the rise of militant groups, notably the Houthi rebels in the north.

==== Houthi rebellion and escalation ====
In September 2014, the Houthis seized control of Yemen's capital, Sana'a, and later expanded their influence to other regions, including the strategic port city of Hodeidah. This move significantly altered the country's power dynamics and led to the formation of a unity government.

==== Saudi-Led intervention and ongoing conflict ====
In March 2015, a coalition led by Saudi Arabia initiated an air campaign aimed at restoring Hadi's government. This intervention marked the beginning of a protracted conflict that has resulted in thousands of deaths and a severe humanitarian crisis.

=== 2025 Developments ===
As of March 2025, the conflict persisted with no definitive resolution in sight. The U.S. faced scrutiny over its military actions in Yemen, particularly regarding civilian casualties and the effectiveness of its strategies against Houthi forces. A leak of U.S. military plans targeting the Houthis sparked controversy and renewed debates about the conduct and objectives of foreign interventions in Yemen.
