= List of political parties in Yemen =

Before the Yemeni Revolution in 2011 and the following civil war, Yemen was a one party dominant state in which the General People's Congress (GPC) held power.

== Legal status ==
Yemen's Political Parties Law mandates that political parties be viable national organizations comprising at least 75 founders and 2,500 members and not restrict membership to a particular region. The government provides financial support to political parties, including a stipend for newspaper publication.

== Elections 2003–2006 ==
The GPC captured 238 of 301 seats in parliament in the 2003 elections. In the September 2006 elections for local and governorate councils, the GPC garnered 315 seats in the governorates (74 percent of the popular vote) and 5,078 local council seats (74 percent of the popular vote). In the September 2006 presidential election, the Joint Meeting Parties (JMP) backed opposition candidate Faisal bin Shamlan, whose success in garnering 22 percent of the popular vote was viewed at the time as a first step in challenging the political stronghold of President Saleh and the GPC. However, disputes between the GPC and the JMP in 2007 over election law amendments, coupled with the JMP’s opposition to President Saleh’s proposed democratic reform measures, have halted initial attempts to forge a dialogue between the two parties.

== List of parties ==
For the sake of clarity, this section is divided into three lists. These are major parties, minor parties and defunct parties. Major parties are defined as parties which gained a seat in the last elections in 2003. As there has been a long time without elections, parties that control territory with their armed wing (such as Ansar Allah) or have evidently shaped Yemeni politics (such as the Al-Rashad Union) are also listed here. All other operating parties are listed under minor parties. Parties that are long inactive are listed as defunct.

=== Major parties ===
Party	Acronym	Leader	Political position & ideologies
General People's Congress المؤتمر الشعبي العام al-Muʾtamar aš-Šaʿbī al-ʿĀmm	GPC	Abdrabbuh Mansur Hadi (pro-Hadi faction); Sadeq Amin Abu Rass (pro-Houthi faction); Ahmed Saleh (pro-Saleh faction)	Centre; Arab nationalism; Yemeni nationalism; Pan-Arabism; Big tent
Yemeni Congregation for Reform التجمع اليمني للإصلاح at-Tajammu’u al-Yamanī lil-Iṣlāḥ	Al-Islah	Mohammed al-Yadumi	Anti-Zionism; Sunni Islamism; Salafism; Tribalism
Yemeni Socialist Party الحزب الاشتراكي اليمني al-Hizb al-Ishtiraki al-Yamani	YSP	Abdulraham Al-Saqqaf	Islamic socialism; Arab nationalism; Social democracy
Nasserist Unionist People's Organisation التنظيم الوحدوي الشعبي الناصري at-Tanẓīm al-Waḥdawī al-Shaʿbī al-Nāṣirī	NUPO	Abdulmalik Al-Mekhlafi	Yemeni unionism Nasserism Anti-Houthi
Arab Socialist Ba'ath Party حزب البعث العربي الاشتراكي; Ḥizb al-Ba‘th al-‘Arabī al-Ishtirākī	ASBP	Qassam Salam	Neo-Ba'athism; Arab socialism Pro-Houthi
Ansar Allah أَنْصَار ٱللَّٰه ʾAnṣār Allāh	Houthis	Abdul-Malik al-Houthi	Anti-Zionism; Autocrat; Irredentism; Shia Islamism
Yemeni Rashad Union	-	Ahmad Muhammad Nasir Muhammad Musa al-Amri	Salafism; Islamic democracy Yemeni unity

=== Minor parties ===
Party	Acronym	Leader	Political position & ideologies
National Solidarity Party حزب التضامن الوطني; Ḥizb al-Taḍāmun al-Watanī	Tadhamon	-	Centrism
Change and Liberation Movement تيار التغيير والتحرير; Tayyār at-Taghayīr wat-Tahrīr	-	Riyadh an-Nahdi	Post-Jihadism; Big tent Turkophilia ^{(alleged)} Islamism ^{(alleged)}
Southern National Coalition الائتلاف الوطني الجنوبي al-I'tilāf al-Watanī al-Janūbī	SNC	Ahmad Salih al-Issa	South Yemeni separatism
Al-Ahrar Organization تنظيم الاحرار; Tanẓīm al-Aḥrār	-	Abduh Bashar	Center-left; Anti-corruption pro-Houthi
Yemen Renaissance Movement تيار نهضة اليمن; Tayyār Nahḍah al-Yaman	YRM	-	Anti-Zionism; Big tent Yemeni unity Economic liberalism
Union of Popular Forces اتحاد القوي الشعبية; Ittiḥād al-Quwa ash-Sha'abiyah	-	-	Arab nationalism Islamic Democracy
Yemeni Republican Federal Party الحزب الجمهوري الاتحادي اليمني al-Ḥizb al-Jumhūrī al-Ittihādī al-Yamanī	YRFP	Sharifah al-Muqatari	Republicanism; Federalism; Yemeni unity Abolishment of militias Pan-Arabism
New Yemen Party حزب اليمن الجديد; Ḥizb al-Yaman al-Jadīd	-	-	Centrism anti-Houthi
Free Yemen Party حزب اليمن الحر; Ḥizb al-Yaman al-Ḥurr	FYP	Nasir bin Yahya al-Arjali	Pro-Houthi
National Accord Party حزب الوفاق الوطني; Ḥizb al-Wafaq al-Watani	-	-	Big Tent; Pro-Houthi
Nasserist Reform Organisation تنظيم التصحيح الشعبي الناصري; Tanzim at-Tashikh ash-Shabi an-Nasiri	NRO	Mujahed al-Quhali	Nasserism; Arab nationalism; Arab socialism
Liberal Party of Yemen الحزب الليبرالي اليمني al-Ḥizb al-Lībrālī al-Yamanī	-	-	Liberalism
Peace and Development Party حزب السلم والتنمية; Ḥizb as-Salam wal-Tanmiyah	SLM	Murad al-Qudsi	Islamic Democracy
Social Nationalist Party - Yemen الحزب القومي الاجتماعي - اليمن al-Ḥizb al-Qawamī al-Ijtimā'ī - al-Yaman	SNPY	Abdul Aziz al-Bakir	Anti-Zionism; Pro-Houthi; Syncretic politics Yemeni nationalism
Southern Arabian League Party حزب رابطة الجنوب العربي; Ḥizb Rabitah al-Janub al-'Arabi	-	Muhammad 'Ajrumuh al-Awlaqi	Southern Separatism; Conservatism
Yemeni Labour Party حزب العمل اليمن; Ḥizb al-'Amal al-Yamani	-	Mukhtar al-Qushaybi	Center-left; Social Democracy
National Arab Socialist Ba'ath Party حزب البعث العربي الاشتراكي القومي; Ḥizb al-Ba‘th al-‘Arabī al-Ishtirākī al-Qawmi	NASB	Ahmad Shutri	Ba'athism; Arab socialism
National Democratic Front Party حزب الجبهة الوطنية الديمقراطية; Ḥizb al-Jabhat al-Wataniyah ad-Dīmuqrātiyah	NDFP	Nasir an-Nasiri (pro-Houthi)	Center-left; Arab nationalism
Justice and Development Youth Party حزب شباب العدالة والتنمية; Ḥizb ash-Shabab al-'Adālah wat-Tanmiyah	-	Bakil al-Humayni	pro-Houthi
an-Nahdhah Movement for Peaceful Change حركة النهضة للتغيير السلمي; Ḥarakat an-Nahḍah li-t-Taghayīr as-Salamī	an-Nahdhah	Ali al-Ahmadi	Social Conservatism; Islamic democracy
Justice and Building Party حزب العدالة والبناء; Ḥizb al-'Adālah wal-Bināʾ	JBP	-	Islamic democracy
Arab Hope Party حزب الأمل العربي; Ḥizb al-Amal al-'Arabī	-	Layla ath-Thawr	Center-left; Civic nationalism
Yemeni Dignity Party حزب الكرامة اليمني; Ḥizb al-Karamah al-Yamanī	-	Ahmad Abdurrahman al-'Ammari	Patriotism; Centrism; Militarism pro-Houthi
Liberation Front Party حزب جبهة التحرير; Ḥizb Jabhat at-Tahrīr	-	-	Arab nationalism
Democratic Nasserist Party الحزب الناصري الديمقراطي al-Ḥizb al-Nasiri al-Dimuqrati	DNP	Yassin Abdu Saeed	Center-left; Nasserism; Arab nationalism
Hizb ut-Tahrir حزب التحرير; Ḥizb at-Taḥrīr	HT	Ata Abu Rashta	Islamism; Caliphalism
Party of Truth حزب الحق; Ḥizb al-Haqq	HP	-	Zaydi Islamism
Party of the League of the Sons of Yemen حزب رابطة أبناء اليمن; Hizb Rabitah Abna' al-Yaman	Rai	-	Conservatism; Islamic Democracy
Yemeni Unionist Congregation التجمع الوحدوي اليمني at-Tajammu' al-Wahdawī al-Yamanī	-	-	Center-left; Arab nationalism

=== Defunct parties ===
Party	Acronym	Leader	Political position & ideologies
Democratic Unionist Party الحزب الوحدوي الديمقراطي; Ḥizb al-Wahdawi ad-Dimuqrati	-	-	Center-left; Arab nationalism
Democratic Septembrist Organization التنظيم السبتمبري الديمقراطي at-Tanẓīm as-Sabtambarī ad-Dīmuqrātī	-	-	Center-left; Arab nationalism
People's Vanguard Party (South Yemen) حزب الطليعة الشعبية; Ḥizb at-Tali'ah ash-Sha'abiyah	-	Abdallah Badhib	Ba'athism
Popular Democratic Union الاتحاد الشعبي الديمقراطي; Ittihad ash-Sha'abi ad-Dīmuqrātī	-	-	Center-left; Arab nationalism
Revolutionary Democratic Party of Yemen الاتحاد الشعبي الديمقراطي اليمن; Ḥizb ad-Dīmuqrātī ath-Thawrī al-Yaman	-	Sultan Omar	Marxism-Leninism; Arab nationalism
Yemen Green Party حزب الخضر الاجتماعي; Ḥizb al-Khadhr al-Ijtimā'ī	-	-	Green politics
Yemeni League Party حزب الرابطة اليمنية; Ḥizb ar-Rabitah al-Yamaniyah	-	-	Center
Yemeni Popular Unity Party حزب الوحدة الشعبية اليمنية; Ḥizb al-Wahdah ash-Sha'abiyah al-Yamaniyah	YPUP	-	Center-left; Arab nationalism
Yemeni Progressive Organization التنظيم التقدمي اليمني at-Tanzim at-Taqadumi al-Yamani	-	-	Center-left

== List of coalitions ==
- The National Council for the Forces of the Peaceful Revolution was declared on 17 August 2011, amidst the Yemeni Revolution, to unite the opposition groups, parties, coalitions, and youth protesters. Among the 143 representatives elected to sit on it are leaders from Al-Islah, the South Yemen Movement, the Alliance of Yemeni Tribes, and the defected First Armoured Division.
  - The Joint Meeting Parties (JMP) was formed in 2005 by five opposition parties to effect political and economic reform. It includes the northern-based, tribal, and Islamist-oriented Yemeni Congregation for Reform (Islah) and the secular Yemeni Socialist Party (YSP), which represents the remnants of the former South Yemeni leadership. According to Al Jazeera English, it was formed in 2002 and includes Islah, Yemeni Socialist Party (YSP), Hizb Al-Haq (a semi-religious party), the Unionist party, and the Popular Forces Union party. The spokesperson as of 23 March 2011 is Muhammad Qahtan, who replaced Mohammed Al-Sabri. Following the fall of Ali Abdullah Saleh, the coalition disappeared without a formal dissolution.
  - The Common Forum includes the five biggest opposition groups in Yemen, including Reform, Socialist, Nasserist, Popular Force and al-Haq. (Likely just another name for the JMP.)

== See also ==
- 2011–2012 Yemeni revolution
