= National Arab Socialist Ba'ath Party – Yemen Region =

National Arab Socialist Ba'ath Party – Yemen Region حزب البعث العربي الاشتراكي القومي - قطر اليمن
- Leader: Dr. Qassam Salam Said
- Founded: 1997
- Headquarters: Street 8A, off Zubairy Street, Sana'a
- Newspaper: Al-Ehyaa Al-Arabi
- Ideology: Ba'athism; Saddamism; Arab nationalism
- International affiliation: Ba'ath Party (Iraqi-dominated faction)
- Colors: Black, Red, White and Green (Pan-Arab colors)
- House of Representatives: 0 / 301

Party flag

The National Arab Socialist Ba'ath Party – Yemen Region (Arabic: حزب البعث العربي الاشتراكي القومي - قطر اليمن Hizb Al-Ba'ath Al-Arabi Al-Ishtiraki Al-Qawmi - Qutr Al-Yaman) is a political party in Yemen. The party is the Yemeni regional organisation of the Iraq-led Ba'ath Party. The secretary of the party in Yemen is Dr. Qassam Salam Said. Abdulwahid Hawash serves as the deputy secretary. The party publishes the newspaper Al-Ehyaa Al-'Arabi (لإحياء العربي, 'Arabic Renaissance').

Ba'athism in Yemen originates back to the 1950s. The party carried out clandestine political activity until 1990. It obtained official registration as the 'National Arab Socialist Ba'ath Party' on 10 February 1997. The party had initially sought to register itself as the 'Arab Socialist Ba'ath Party' in 1995, but that name was accorded by the authorities to the Yemeni regional branch of the Syria-led Ba'ath Party.

The party contested the 1993 parliamentary election in alliance with the pro-Syria Ba'ath Party, winning seven seats. After the election the relations between the two Ba'athist groups soured, though, and they went on to contest further elections separately. The party contested the 1997 parliamentary election, but failed to win any seats. The party called for a boycott of the 1999 presidential election. In the 2003 parliamentary elections, the party obtained 23,745 votes (0.4% of the national vote) and again failed to re-enter parliament. The party won two district council seats in the 2006 local council elections. In February 2000, Dr. Qassam Salam, the branch's leader, was sued by the Ministry of Information because of an article critical of Saudi Arabia.

Politically, the party is aligned with the ruling General People's Congress. During the Arab Spring, this posture caused an internal split in the party. In March 2011, there were reports that the Al Hudaydah branch of the party had sided with the uprising, following violent attacks on protestors in that city.

== See also ==
- Arab Socialist Ba'ath Party – Yemen Region
- List of political parties in Yemen
- People's Vanguard Party (South Yemen)
