= Najeeb Qahtan al-Shaabi =

Yemeni politician (1953–2021)

- نجيب قحطان الشعبي

Personal details
- Born: 1953 Sha'ab, Lahj, Aden Protectorate
- Died: 24 May 2021 (aged 67–68) Aden, Yemen
- Party: General People's Congress
- Parent: Qahtan Muhammad al-Shaabi (father)
- Education: Cairo University

Najeeb Qahtan al-Shaabi (Arabic: نجيب قحطان الشعبي; 1953 – 24 May 2021) was a Yemeni politician who was a candidate in the 1999 presidential election in Yemen. He ran as an Independent, despite being a member of the General People's Congress, against President Ali Abdullah Saleh. He received 3.8% of the vote.

He served as a member of the House of Representatives from 1991 until his death in 2021.

He was the son of Qahtan Muhammad al-Shaabi, the first president of South Yemen. On 24 May 2021, Najeeb died of COVID-19 in Aden, Yemen during the COVID-19 pandemic in Yemen.

== Early life ==
Shaabi was born in 1953 in Shaab, a village in Tur Al Bahah district, Lahij Governorate. He was named after Mohamed Naguib, the Egyptian general who led the country after the revolution in 1952. He received primary and secondary education at a school in Aden.

Shaabi later moved to Egypt and enrolled in Cairo University, graduating from the Faculty of Economics and Political Sciences in 1976. He continued within the same faculty, attaining a master's degree and enrolling for a Ph.D. by 1983 before returning to Yemen.

== Political career ==
After the unification of Yemen in 1990, Shaabi became a member of parliament as part of the ruling General People's Congress, and was chosen to be a part of its permanent committee in the same year. He supported the Yemeni government during the civil war of 1994, receiving the Unity Medal for his dedication. He was reelected to his seat in parliament during the 1997 Yemeni parliamentary elections.
