= Constitution of Yemen =

The Constitution of Yemen was ratified by popular referendum on 16 May 1991. It defines the republic as an independent and sovereign Arab and Islamic country and establishes sharia, or Islamic law, as the basis of all laws. In February 2001, several amendments passed by national referendum extended the presidential term to seven years and the parliamentary term to six years, and increased the size and authority of the Shura Council.

Due to the 2011–2012 Yemeni revolution, President Abd Rabbuh Mansur Al-Hadi was expected to draft a new constitution from 2012 to 2014. In January 2015, a committee had drafted a new constitution; however, both the GPC and Houthi members of the National Authority for Monitoring the Implementation of NDC Outcomes have refused to vote on this draft. This will likely delay a planned referendum on the new constitution, and therefore, the next presidential and parliamentary elections, which have been delayed until the referendum can proceed.

== Overview ==
_{The most current form of the Constitution of Yemen is the version amended in February 2001.} _{This is an overview of the most current Constitution posted by the United Nations.}

=== Basic Fundamentals of the State ===
- The Republic of Yemen is an independent sovereign state.
- The Republic of Yemen's official language is Arabic and its religion is Islam.
- Islamic Shari’ah is the source of all legislation.
- The Republic of Yemen will set clear rules and regulations on the formations of political parties.
- Misuse of Government post of public fund in the interest of a particular party not allowed.
- The National Economy is based on freedom of economic activity, promoting Islamic social justice, lawful economic competition and protection of private ownership.
- The State controls all natural resources.
- The State promotes Free Trade and guarantees protection for both consumers and producers.
- The State regulates all currency (*Article 11) and taxes are to be assessed through public interest.
- General confiscation of property is prohibited, private confiscation is not allowed without a legal judgment.
- The state shall collect the Zakat (Shari’ah tax) and shall spend it through its legal channels in accordance with law.
- The right of inheritance is guaranteed in accordance with Islamic tenets (Shari’ah). A special law will be issued accordingly.
- The law shall maintain the integrity of the family and strengthen its ties.
- Public office is a duty and an honor. Persons in public office are to serve the public interest and the people. The law shall specify the terms of public service and the duties and rights of persons in public office.
- The police is a civilian and Regular force which performs its duties for the service of the people and guarantees peace and security for the people.
- Military, security, police and other forces shall not be employed in the interest of a party, an individual or group. They shall be safeguarded against all forms of differentiation resulting from party affiliation, racism, factionalism, regionalism and tribalism in order to guarantee their neutrality and the fulfillment of their duties in the proper manner. The members of all forces are banned from party memberships and activities according to the law.

=== Rights and Duties of a Citizen ===
The Constitution of The Republic of Yemen defines a number of duties and rights belonging to citizens of Yemen. The right to education, health, social services, freedom of speech and expression, prohibition of unreasonable search and seizure, right to an attorney, prohibition of cruel and unusual punishments, right to due process, right to petition the government, freedom of movement, right to assembly. Women were defined as “sisters of men”, receiving rights and unique protections outlined by stipulated law and Shari’ah.

=== The Federal Government ===
The Federal Government is divided up between The House of Representatives, The Consultative Council, The President of the Republic and The Council of Ministers. The Constitution also defines a separate Judicial System.

=== The House of Representatives ===
The House of Representatives is the main body of Legislative authority in the Republic of Yemen. According to the Constitution, the House of Representatives consists of 301 members elected in a secret, free and equal vote directly by the people. These 301 members will be voted on by regions labeled as constituencies. The Constitution states that these constituencies shall be equal in number of populations with a variation of not more than 5% plus or minus and that each constituency shall elect a member to the House of Representatives. The standard term for a member of the House of Representatives is 6 years. The House of Representatives internally elects a Speaker of the House alongside three deputies forming the Presiding Board of the House.

=== The Consultative Council ===
The Consultative Council consists of (111) members to be directly appointed by the President of the Republic. Members of the Council shall not be drawn from the House of Representatives or from local councils. The Consultative Council performs advisory service to the President. Duties of the Council consist of:

- Holding joint sessions in conjunction with the House of Representatives to second nominations for the office of the President of the Republic, approve socio-economic development plans and ratify agreements and treaties of defense, alliance, conciliation, peace and border concerns.
- Members of the Consultative Council shall have the right to offer counseling and present informed opinion on matters forwarded by the President to the joint sessions.
- Assess the government's economic, financial, fiscal and investment policies and programs on an annual basis.
- Review periodic reports issued by the Audit and Control Bureau and forward a summary report of these to the President of the Republic.

=== The President of the Republic ===
The President of the Republic of Yemen is a part of the Executive branch of the Yemeni government. Presidential Candidates must be at least 40 years of age, native to Yemen, clear of criminal record and not married to any foreigners. The President of the Republic shall be by means of direct popular voting in competitive elections. The President shall appoint a Vice President granted that they fit the same qualifications as a Presidential Candidate. The President acts as the Supreme Commander of the Armed Forces. Presidential terms span over 7 years with no president being allowed to serve more than two terms. The direct responsibilities of the President are defined in the Constitution as such:

- To represent the Republic internally and externally.
- To call the voters, at the specified time, to elect the House of Representatives.
- To call for national referenda.
- To name the person who will form the government, and to issue a republican decree with the names of the cabinet members.
- To lay down, jointly with the government, the general policy of the state and to oversee the implementation of the policy as stipulated in the Constitution.
- To call the cabinet to a joint meeting with the President, as the need arises.
- To name the members of the National Defense Council according to the law.
- To promulgate the laws passed by the House of Representatives and their publication, and to issue the decrees that execute them.
- To appoint and dismiss senior government officials and military/police officers according to the law.
- To establish military ranks according to the law.
- To award badges, medals and decorations stipulated by Law, or to permit the wearing of badges and honours awarded by other States.
- To issue decrees endorsing Treaties and Conventions approved by the House of Representatives.
- To ratify agreements that do not require the approval of the House of Representatives if approved by the cabinet.
- To establish diplomatic delegations abroad and to appoint and recall ambassadors according to the Law.
- To accredit diplomatic representatives of foreign countries and organizations.
- To grant political asylum.
- To proclaim states of emergency and general mobilization according to the Law.
- Any other functions stipulated in the Constitution and Law.

=== The Council of Ministers ===
The Council of Ministers is the highest authority of the state under the Constitution. The Council of Ministers consists of the Prime Minister and their selected cabinet in consultation with the President. The Council of Ministers is responsible for the execution of overall state policies in the political, economic, social, cultural, and defense fields, according to the Laws and cabinet's resolutions. Each minister is in charge of the supervision and direction of his ministry and its branches throughout the Republic.

=== Local Government ===
As defined by the Constitution, the land of The Republic of Yemen was to be split and segmented into different administrative sections. It further defines the power of local government by declaring it inseparable from the state, having governors directly under the authority of the President and the Council of Ministers.

=== Judicial System ===
The Judicial System as described in the Constitution is an autonomous authority subject only to the law. The Supreme Court of the Republic is the highest judicial authority. The Supreme Court of the Republic also acts as the highest appellate court and can dispute jurisdiction. The Supreme Court also holds the power to the investigate and prosecute the President of the Republic, the Vice President and the Council of Ministers.
