= Al-Sahman =

Al-Sahman السهمان
- Sub-district
- Location in Yemen
- Coordinates: 15°11′47″N 44°35′03″E
- Country: Yemen
- Governorate: Sana'a
- District: Attyal

Population (2004)
  - Total: 2,441
- Time zone: UTC+3

Al-Sahman (Arabic: السهمان) is a sub-district located in Attyal District, Sana'a Governorate, Yemen. Al-Sahman had a population of 2441 according to the 2004 census.
