= Bani Jabr (Sanaa) =

Bani Jabr بني جبر
- Sub-district
- Country: Yemen
- Governorate: Sana'a
- District: Attyal

Population (2004)
  - Total: 10,818
- Time zone: UTC+3

Bani Jabr (Arabic: بني جبر) is a sub-district located in Attyal District, Sana'a Governorate, Yemen. Bani Jabr had a population of 10818 according to the 2004 census.
