= Bani Siham =

Bani Siham بني سحام
- Sub-district
- Location in Yemen
- Coordinates: 15°21′00″N 44°33′27″E
- Country: Yemen
- Governorate: Sana'a
- District: Attyal

Population (2004)
  - Total: 6,719
- Time zone: UTC+3

Bani Siham (Arabic: بني سحام) is a sub-district located in Attyal District, Sana'a Governorate, Yemen. Bani Siham had a population of 6719 according to the 2004 census.
