= Jabal al-Lawz (Sanaa) =

Jabal al-Lawz جبل اللوز
- Sub-district
- Location in Yemen
- Country: Yemen
- Governorate: Sana'a
- District: Attyal

Population (2004)
  - Total: 13,432
- Time zone: UTC+3

Jabal al-Lawz (Arabic: جبل اللوز) is a sub-district located in Attyal District, Sana'a Governorate, Yemen. Jabal al-Lawz had a population of 13,432 according to the 2004 census.
