= Military ranks of South Yemen =

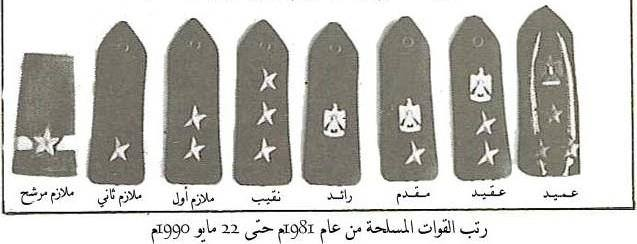
Military ranks in the South Yemeni army

The Military ranks of South Yemen were the military insignia used by the People's Democratic Republic of Yemen (Note: Also called South Yemen) Armed Forces (officially known as the People's Defence Forces) until its dissolution during the 1990 Yemeni unification.

== Military ranks (1970–1981) ==
=== Commissioned officer ranks ===
The rank insignia of commissioned officers.

Rank group	General / flag officers	Senior officers			Junior officers
South Yemeni Land Forces
South Yemeni Land Forces	عميد; Amid	عقيد; Aqid	مقدم; Muqaddam	رائد; Ra'id	نقيب; Naqib	ملازم أول; Mulazim awwal	ملازم ثان; Mulazim than
Rank group	General/flag officers	Senior officers			Junior officers

=== Other ranks ===
The rank insignia of non-commissioned officers and enlisted personnel.

Rank group	Senior NCOs					Junior NCOs	Enlisted
South Yemeni Land Forces
South Yemeni Land Forces	رقيب أول; Raqib 'awal	مساعد; Raqib thani	أول; Naib 'awal	Naib	'Arif	Wakil 'arif	جندي; Jundiun
Rank group	Senior NCOs					Junior NCOs	Enlisted

== Military ranks (1981–1990) ==
=== Commissioned officer ranks ===
The rank insignia of commissioned officers.

Rank group	General / flag officers	Senior officers			Junior officers
South Yemeni Land Forces (1980–1990)
South Yemeni Land Forces (1980–1990)	عميد; Amid	عقيد; Aqid	مقدم; Muqaddam	رائد; Ra'id	نقيب; Naqib	ملازم أول; Mulazim awwal	ملازم ثان; Mulazim than
Rank group	General/flag officers	Senior officers			Junior officers

Student officers

Rank group	Student officer
South Yemeni Land Forces (1980–1990)
South Yemeni Land Forces (1980–1990)	ملازم; Mulazim

=== Other ranks ===
The rank insignia of non-commissioned officers and enlisted personnel.

Rank group	Senior NCOs					Junior NCOs	Enlisted
South Yemeni Land Forces (1980–1990)
South Yemeni Land Forces (1980–1990)	رقيب أول; Raqib 'awal	مساعد; Raqib thani	أول; Naib 'awal	Naib	'Arif	Wakil 'arif	جندي; Jundiun
Rank group	Senior NCOs					Junior NCOs	Enlisted
