= Federalization of Yemen =

Proposed transformation of Yemen into a federal state

- Category: Federated state
- Location: Yemen
- Government: State government

The federalization of Yemen is the proposed transformation of Yemen from a unitary state to a federation. Driven by the significant economic, religious, political, and historical differences between the northern and southern parts as well as the southern and eastern regions of the country, federalization has been a common and controversial proposal to resolve regionalist tensions since the unification of the country in 1990.

== Early history ==
In 1962, the British Aden Protectorate was transformed into the Federation of South Arabia, which initially contained 15 states after the Protectorate of South Arabia (Eastern) refused to join the new federal union. The country became South Yemen, a unitary state, in 1967. After South Yemen unified with North Yemen in 1990, the new government was quickly divided over the issue of decentralization, with the Yemeni Socialist Party expressing support for a federal system while the General People's Congress opposed it. While an agreement was eventually reached to decentralize the country, it was largely abandoned following the outbreak of a civil war in 1994. Decentralization continued to find popularity among members of the Yemeni opposition, and the opposition coalition known as the Joint Meeting Parties expressed interest in federalism in 2009.

== Hadi plan ==
The 2013–2014 National Dialogue Conference concluded that Yemen would adopt federalism in an attempt to resolve the political crisis that began with the Yemeni Revolution in 2011. Under the federal system, Yemen's official name would become the Federal Republic of Yemen. A committee organized by Yemeni President Abdrabbuh Mansur Hadi determined that Yemen would be split into six federal regions: Azal, Saba, Tihama, Aden, Janad, and Hadhramaut. Azal, Saba, Janad and Tihama would have been northern provinces whereas Aden and Hadhramaut would have been southern. Sana’a, the capital, was to become a federal city and would not have been part of any region. Aden, the former capital of South Yemen, would have been a part of the Aden region, but would have had special legislative and executive powers. Each region was to be further divided into states, which would have taken the place of Yemen's existing governorates. The conclusions of the Conference formed the basis of a new constitution, which was to be put to a referendum in 2015.

Proposed federal regions
Federal region	Governorates
Aden (Arabic: إقليم عدن, romanized: Igleem 'Adan)	Aden, Abyan, Lahij, Dhale
Azal (Arabic: إقليم ازال, romanized: Igleem Azal)	Sanaa, 'Amran, Dhamar, Saada
Hadhramaut (Arabic: إقليم حضرموت, romanized: Igleem Hadramawt)	Hadhramaut, Mahra, Shabwah, Socotra Archipelago
Janad (Arabic: إقليم الجند, romanized: Igleem al-Jund)	Taiz, Ibb
Sheba (Arabic: إقليم سبأ, romanized: Igleem Saba')	Ma'rib, Al Bayda, Al Jawf
Tihama (Arabic: إقليم تهامة, romanized: Igleem Tihamah)	Al Hudaydah, Raymah, Al Mahwit, Hajjah

=== Reactions ===
The plan for a six-region federation received international praise, but was denounced by many within Yemen. The Southern Movement suspected that the division of the south into two regions was an attempt to turn southern secessionists against each other; they preferred a two-region division between the north and the south. The Zaidi elites in the Azal region would have been left with almost no natural resources, whereas the sparsely populated Saba and Hadhramaut regions would have received nearly all of the country's natural resources. Meanwhile, the Houthis were outraged that the plan would have landlocked their home governorate of Saada. The referendum on the new federal constitution was indefinitely delayed by the intensification of the Yemeni Civil War in 2015. Some commentators have cited Hadi's federalization plan as one of the main causes of the civil war.

== See also ==
- Federalization of Syria
- Federalism in Iraq
