= Qarwa al-Tyyal =

Qarwa al-Tyyal قروى الطيال
- Sub-district
- Country: Yemen
- Governorate: Sana'a
- District: Attyal

Population (2004)
  - Total: 2,843
- Time zone: UTC+3

Qarwa al-Tyyal (Arabic: قروى الطيال) is a sub-district located in Attyal District, Sana'a Governorate, Yemen. Qarwa al-Tyyal had a population of 2843 according to the 2004 census.
