= Mohammed al-Yadoumi =

Yemeni politician and chairman of Islah Party

- محمد اليدومي
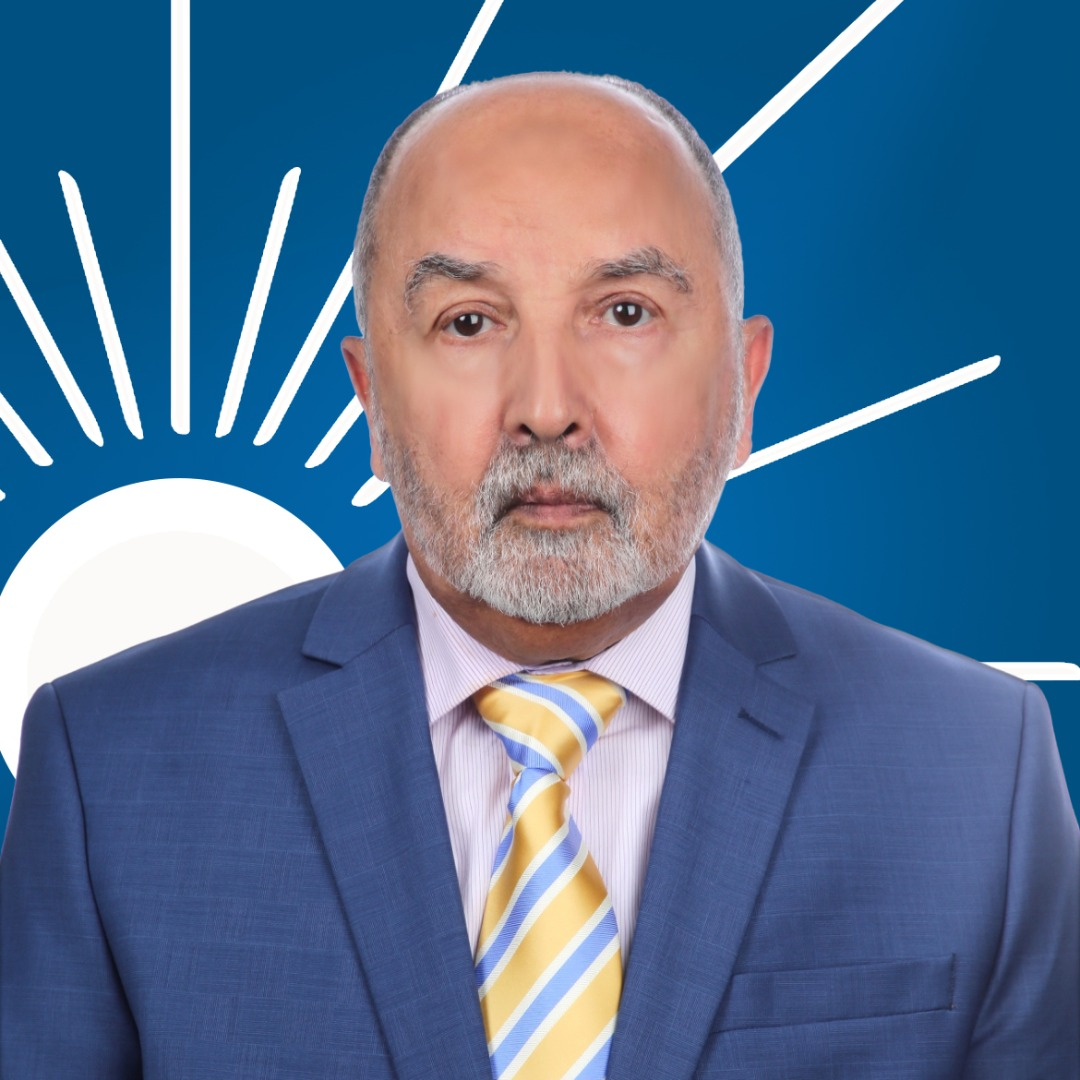

Chairman of the Yemeni Islah Party
- Incumbent
- Assumed office 8 January 2008
- Preceded by: Abdullah ibn Husayn al-Ahmar

Personal details
- Born: 1947 (age 78–79) Taiz, Yemen
- Party: Yemeni Islah Party
- Education: Sanaa University
- Occupation: Politician

Mohammed Abdullah al-Yadoumi (Arabic: محمد عبد الله اليدومي, born 1947) is a Yemeni politician serving as chairman of Yemeni Islah Party since 2008. He previously served as an officer in Yemen's interior ministry and intelligence agency. He is considered the most powerful political leader inside the Islah party.

== Early life and education ==
Al-Yadoumi was born and grew up in Taiz Governorate, but his origin traces back to Attyal District, Sanaa Governorate. He studied basic education in Egypt, then he returned to Yemen and continued his secondary education in Sana'a. He entered Police College in Egypt and graduated in 1973. He got a licentiate degree from the College of Art, Sanaa University.

== Career ==
After graduation from the Police College in 1973, Al-Yadoumi worked as an officer in the Ministry of Interior, and then in the Political Security Organization, the country's main intelligence agency. He assumed many key positions and was gradually promoted to the rank of Colonel. In 1984 he suspended his work in the intelligence agency of Yemen and a year later he founded Al Sahwa newspaper and served as its editor until 1994. In 1990 he was elected as the Assistant Secretary-General of the party and as General Secretary in 1994. On 6 January 2008 the Higher Committee of the Yemeni Congregation for Reform (Islah) Party held a meeting to name a successor after the death of its chairman Sheikh Abdullah ibn Hussein al-Ahmar, who died on 29 December 2007. The Committee has chosen Mohammed al-Yadoumi as Acting Chairman of the Supreme Committee of the Islah until the party’s next general conference, which was supposed to be held in 2011. However, the conference was canceled as a result of its coincidence with the Yemeni Revolution. On 16 February 2014 he was appointed as an advisor to the Yemeni president.

== Raid on his house ==
In 2015 the Houthis raided his house in Sana'a and abducted his brother and two of his sons, and launched a widespread arrest campaign against Islah-affiliated leaders after Houthi takeover and Saudi-led Coalition intervention in Yemen.
