= Ali Ahmad Nasser al-Dhahab =

Yemeni politician (died 2010)

Ali Ahmad Nasser al-Dhahab (Arabic: على احمد ناصر الذهب) (d. November 30, 2010, Cairo, Egypt) was a Yemeni politician, belonging to the Arab Socialist Ba'ath Party – Yemen Region. He became a Ba'athist activist during his student days in Sana'a, and rose to become the Assistant Regional Secretary of the regional branch in Yemen. He was the son of Sheikh Ahmed Nasser al-Dhahab, and succeeded him as leader of their family.

In 1993 he was elected to parliament, a seat he would hold until his death. Ali Ahmad Nasser al-Dhahab died whilst undergoing medical treatment in Cairo, at the age of 53.
