= Union of Popular Forces =

Yemeni liberal political party

Union of Popular Forces اتحاد القوي الشعبية
- Abbreviation: UPF
- General Secretary: Abdussalam Razzaz
- Founded: 1961
- Headquarters: Sana'a
- Newspaper: Sawt ash-Shurah
- Ideology: Liberalism; Islamic modernism; Arab nationalism
- Political position: Center-left
- Colours: Dark green
- House of Representatives: 0 / 301

The Union of Popular Forces (Arabic: اتحاد القوي الشعبية, Ittiḥād al-Quwa ash-Sha'abiyah), sometimes also written as Union of Yemeni Popular Forces or Federation of Popular Forces is a liberal Zaydi Shi'a political party in Yemen. It was founded in 1961 and has been characterized as a small party of Zaydi intellectuals. Like the Islamist Hizb al-Haqq, it has been founded by Sayyids, which are members of the traditional elite of the country's north who claimed descent from the family of Muhammad.

The Party's founder and leader was Ibrahim al-Wazir, who has also been active as a cleric since the 1940s. Al-Wazir was an influential contemporary Islamic intellectual who had published dozens of books over his life, during some of which he lived in the diaspora. During his period in Egypt, he had contact with intellectuals such as the Islamist thinker Sayyid Qutb, the liberal trade unionist Gamal al-Banna and the Islamic modernist Mohammed al-Ghazali, which influenced his worldview.

In summer 1995, the party's office in the Sana'a was attacked and destroyed by the security police. In November 2005, it was a founding member of the opposition alliance Joint Meeting Parties. In July 2006, it backed the alliance's presidential candidate Faysal bin Shamlan in the presidential election.

The party's general secretary Ibrahim al-Wazir died on 28 June 2014 in a hospital in London. Muhammad Abdurrahman ar-Ruba'i, the party's next general secretary, died on 8 June 2019 after a long time of illness. The current general secretary is Abdussalam Razzaz.

== Positions ==
The party has been described as a Zaydi Shi'a liberal party. Furthermore, it defined itself as anti-monarchist, particularly during the early days of the republic and supported democracy, self-government, freedom and a participatory system. The party's leader al-Wazir was strongly influenced by Islamic modernist as well as trade unionist thinkers and advocated for a modernization of Zaydi doctrine. In its program, the party is advocating for Islamic democracy and Arab nationalist ideas.

The party opposes the Houthi movement, considering its takeover as return of the monarchy of the Imamate it opposed and accuses the Houthis of Iranian backing. It supports the national struggle against the Houthis and calls for the reestablishment of legitimacy, as well as the creation of a federal democratic state.

== Electoral results ==
| Election year | # of total votes | % of overall vote | # of seats |
House of Representatives
| 1993 | 2,662 | 0.12% | 0 / 301 |
| 2003 | 11,967 | 0.20% | 0 / 301 |

== See also ==
- List of political parties in Yemen
