= Yemeni unification =

1990 merger of North and South Yemen into modern Yemen

Unification of Yemen
- Part of the end of the Cold War
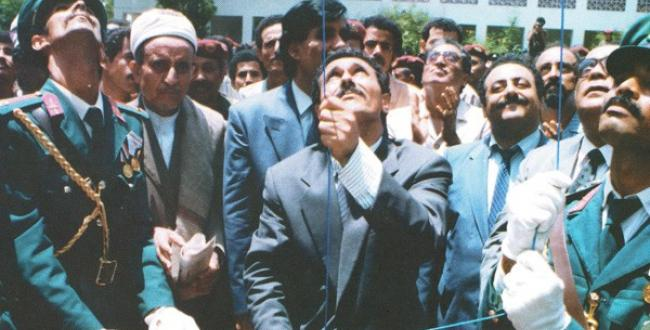
- Ali Abdullah Saleh (President of the Yemen Arab Republic) and Ali Salem al-Beidh (President of the People's Democratic Republic of Yemen) raising the new flag of their newly unified country
- Native name: al-waḥda al-Yamaniyya الوحدة اليمنية
- Date: 22 May 1990
- Location: Yemen Arab Republic People's Democratic Republic of Yemen
- Cause: Arab nationalism; First Yemenite War; Second Yemenite War; Discovery of Ṣāfer oilfield in Shabwah in the south and Marib in the north; South Yemeni crisis; Dissolution of the Soviet Union
- Outcome: Unification of Yemen: North's capital Sanaa becomes the capital of unified Yemen; The Yemeni rial becomes the official currency of unified Yemen; The South's "United Republic" became the country's national anthem

The Yemeni unification (Note: Arabic: الوحدة اليمنية, romanized: al-waḥda l-Yamaniyya) took place on 22 May 1990, when the People's Democratic Republic of Yemen (South Yemen) and the Yemen Arab Republic (North Yemen) united, forming the Republic of Yemen.

== Background ==
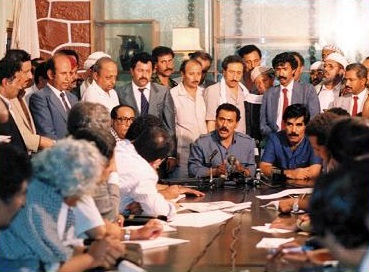
North Yemeni president, Ali Abdullah Saleh, with the Secretary-General of the Yemeni Socialist Party, Ali Salem al-Beidh, signing the unity agreement on 30 November 1989.

North Yemen became an independent Kingdom in the context of the dissolution of the Ottoman Empire in November 1918. Most of South Yemen was the British Aden Protectorate, effectively under colonial control, while the city of Aden itself became a British colony in its own right in 1937. In one of the many proxy conflicts of the Cold War, a South Yemeni insurgency (with the support and backing of the Soviet Union) led by two nationalist parties revolted, causing the United Kingdom to unify the area and in 1967 to withdraw from its former colony.

Following the North Yemen Civil War, the north overthrew the monarchy and established a Nasserist republican government led by a military junta that included tribal representatives. It enjoyed modest oil revenues and remittances from its citizens working in the oil-rich Arab states of the Persian Gulf. Its population in the 1980s was estimated at 12 million as opposed to 3 million in South Yemen.

South Yemen developed as a mostly secular society ruled first by the National Liberation Front, which later morphed into the ruling Yemeni Socialist Party. The only avowedly communist nation in the Middle East, South Yemen received significant foreign aid and other assistance from the Soviets.

=== War in 1972 ===
In October 1972, fighting erupted between north and south; North Yemen was supplied by Saudi Arabia, and South Yemen was supplied by the Soviet Union. Fighting was short-lived, and the conflict led to the 28 October 1972 Cairo Agreement, which set forth a plan to unify the two countries.

=== War in 1979 ===
Fighting broke out again in February and March 1979, with South Yemen allegedly supplying aid to rebels in the north by the National Democratic Front and crossing the border. Southern forces made it as far as the city of Taiz before withdrawing. Again, North Yemen was supported by anticommunist Saudi Arabia and Taiwan, and secretly in the name of the Royal Saudi Air Force from 1979 to 1990. This conflict was also short-lived.

In the late 1980s, oil exploration near the border between the two nations – the Marib Governorate in the North and the Shabwah Governorate in the South – spurred interest in developing agreements to exploit resources there and lift both nations' economies. In May 1988, the two governments came to an understanding that considerably reduced tensions, including agreements to renew discussions concerning unification, to establish a joint oil exploration area along their undefined border, now called the Joint Investment Area, by the Hunt Oil Company and Exxon. The same month, they formed the Yemeni Company for Investment in Mineral and Oil Resources (YCIMOR).

In November 1989, Ali Abdullah Saleh of North Yemen and Ali Salem al-Beidh of South Yemen jointly accepted a draft unity constitution originally drawn up in 1981, which included a demilitarised border and border passage by Yemenis on the sole basis of a national identification card and a capital city in Sanaa.

== Unification ==
Yemen prior to unification

Flag of the newly formed Republic of Yemen being raised on top of the presidential palace of former South Yemen in Aden.

The Republic of Yemen was declared on 22 May 1990. Ali Abdullah Saleh of the north became Head of State, and Ali Salem al-Beidh of the south became Head of Government. A 30-month transitional period for completing the unification of the two political and economic systems was set. A presidential council was jointly elected by the 26-member Yemen Arab Republic advisory council and the 17-member People's Democratic Republic of Yemen presidium. The presidential council appointed a Prime Minister, who formed a Cabinet. There was also a 301-seat provisional unified parliament, consisting of 159 members from the north, 111 members from the south, and 31 independent members appointed by the chairman of the council.

A unity constitution was agreed upon in May 1990 and ratified by the populace in May 1991. It affirmed Yemen's commitment to free elections, a multiparty political system, the right to own private property, equality under the law, and respect of basic human rights. Parliamentary elections were held on 27 April 1993. International groups assisted in the organisation of the elections and observed actual balloting. The resulting Parliament included 143 General People's Congress, 69 Yemeni Socialist Party (YSP), 63 Islah (the nation's largest Islamist party), 6 Ba'athists, 3 Nasserist Unionist People's Organisation, 2 Al Haq, and 15 independents. The new parliament represented the North strongly. The YSP, though it had won the most seats in voting in the less populated south, was considered a minor part of the new coalition government. The head of Islah, Abdullah ibn Husayn al-Ahmar, became the speaker of Parliament. Islah was invited into the ruling coalition, and the presidential council was altered to include one Islah member.

The newly unified nation faced political crisis when an estimated 800,000 Yemeni nationals and overseas workers were sent home by Saudi Arabia following Yemen's decision not to support Coalition forces in the Gulf War. Remittances from these workers, an important part of the economy, were slashed and many Yemenis were placed in refugee camps while the government decided where to house them and how to re-integrate them into the workforce. The repatriation of these Yemenis immediately increased the nation's population by 7%.

== Aftermath ==
=== Civil war ===
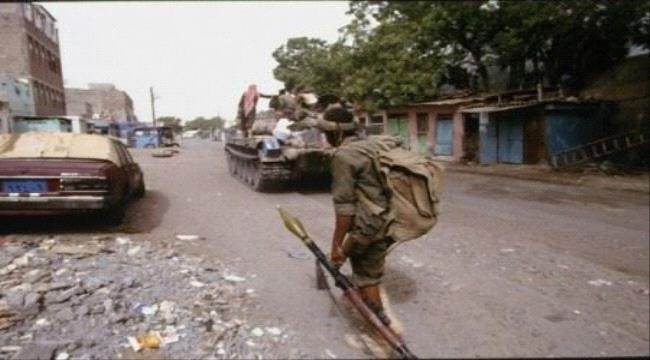
Fighters in Aden

Conflicts within the coalition resulted in the self-imposed exile of Vice President Ali Salem al-Beidh to Aden beginning in August 1993 and a deterioration in the general security situation as political rivals settled scores and tribal elements took advantage of the unsettled situation. Haidar Abu Bakr al-Attas, the former Southern Prime Minister, continued to serve as Yemen's Prime Minister, but his government was ineffective due to political infighting. Continuous negotiations between northern and southern leaders resulted in the signing of the document of pledge and accord in Amman, Jordan on 20 February 1994. Despite this, clashes intensified until civil war broke out in early May 1994. Significantly, one of the institutions that had not yet unified was the military arms of both nations.

Southern leaders seceded and established the Democratic Republic of Yemen (DRY) on 21 May 1994, but the new state was not recognised by the international community. Ali Nasir Muhammad, the exiled South Yemen leader, assisted military operations against the secessionists.

Aden was captured on 7 July 1994. Other resistance quickly collapsed and thousands of southern leaders and military went into exile.

In the aftermath of the civil war, Yemeni Socialist Party leaders within Yemen reorganised the party and elected a new politburo in July 1994. However, the party remained disheartened and without its former influence. Islah held a party convention in September 1994. The General People's Congress did the same in June 1995.

In 1994, amendments to the unity constitution eliminated the presidential council. President Ali Abdallah Saleh was elected by Parliament on 1 October 1994 to a 5-year term. The constitution provided that henceforth the President is to be elected by popular vote from at least two candidates selected by the legislature.

=== Post-civil war ===
Yemeni Civil War Map (2014–present), Teal is Houthi-controlled Yemen, White is Al-Qaeda in the Arabian Peninsula, Pink is Republic of Yemen as of 26 October 2026

Adopting a Western style governmental system, Yemen held its first direct presidential election in September 1999, electing President Ali Abdullah Saleh to a 5-year term. The elections were marred by claims of voter fraud and token opposition, after the Yemeni Socialist Party was barred from standing for election due to a failure to secure sufficient support from legislators in the Yemeni House of Representatives.

Yemen held its second multiparty parliamentary elections in April 1997. Constitutional amendments adopted in the summer of 2000 extended the presidential term by two years, thus moving the next presidential elections to 2006. The amendments also extended the parliamentary term of office to a 6-year term, thus moving elections for these seats to 2003. On 20 February 2001, a new constitutional amendment created a bicameral legislature consisting of a Shura Council (111 seats; members appointed by the president) and a House of Representatives (301 seats; members elected by popular vote). Yemen is now a dominant-party system with the General People's Congress in power.

Friction and troubles continued, elements in the south perceive unfair treatment by the north. This has given birth to a popular movement called the South Yemen Movement which calls for the return of an independent southern state. In 2015, this time as a pawn in the proxy war between Saudi Arabia and Iran, Yemen again was engulfed in civil war, which continues to this day.

==== Integrations ====
- The North Yemeni rial and the South Yemeni dinar remained legal tender during a transitional period. In 1991, the dinar was withdrawn from circulation, with 26 rial exchanged for one dinar. In 1993, the first coins were issued for the Republic of Yemen called Yemeni rials.
- The capital of the Republic of Yemen is North's old capital, Sanaa.
- The South's "Repeat, O World, My Song" became the country's national anthem.
- 26 September and 14 October are both celebrated as Revolution Day, with the former celebrating the North's revolution against the imams and the latter celebrating the South's revolution against the British Empire.
- 30 November is celebrated as Independence Day, as it is the day the South gained independence from the British, as opposed to 1 November, which was celebrated in the north as Independence Day from the Ottoman Empire.
- The Republic of Yemen kept the North's United Nations name, Yemen, as opposed to the South's Democratic Yemen.
- The Republic of Yemen accepts responsibility for all treaties and debts of its predecessors.
- The Republic of Yemen kept the South's system of Governorates (Muhafazah), and split the North's liwa (provinces) into smaller governorates, leaving the current Governorates of Yemen.
- The Republic of Yemen uses the North's calling code, +967, as opposed to the South's +969.
- The Republic of Yemen uses the North's ISO 3166-1 alphabetic codes (alpha-2: YE, alpha-3: YEM), as opposed to the South's (alpha-2: YD, alpha-3: YMD); a new numeric code was assigned for the unified country (887) to replace the old numeric codes (North: 886; South: 720), as is the custom for any merging of countries.

== See also ==
- Southern Movement
- South Yemen insurgency
- Yemeni Socialist Party
- United Republic
