= 1997 Yemeni parliamentary election =

- 27 April 1997
- All 301 seats in the House of Representatives; 151 seats needed for a majority
- Turnout: 60.96% (▼23.96pp)
Party	Leader	Vote %	Seats	+/–
GPC	Ali Abdullah Saleh	43.10	187	+64
Al-Islah	Abdullah ibn Husayn al-Ahmar	23.39	53	−9
NUPO	Abdulmalik Al-Mekhlafi	2.03	3	+2
Ba'ath Party		0.75	2	−5
Independents	–	29.54	54	+7
This lists parties that won seats. See the complete results below.
Prime Minister before	Prime Minister after
Abdul Aziz Abdul Ghani; GPC	Faraj Said Bin Ghanem; Independent

Parliamentary elections were held in Yemen on 27 April 1997 to elect all 301 members of the House of Representatives for a six-year term. The governing General People's Congress of President Ali Abdullah Saleh won a landslide victory, taking 187 of the 301 seats, although several opposition parties including the Yemeni Socialist Party boycotted the election alleging that the government had harassed and arrested their party workers. The main opposition party, al-Islah, attacked the government for not carrying out economic reforms and for corruption. Voter turnout was 61.0%.

== Campaign ==
Of the 16 million people in Yemen about 4.6 million were registered to vote with about a quarter of them being women. However, only about 2.6 million people received their voting cards.

Over 2,300 candidates, from 12 parties, competed for the 301 seats in the House of Representatives. Most candidates were independents, however many of these were backed by either the General People's Congress or al-Islah parties. There were 19 female candidates. Each party or independent candidate had their own logo such as an owl or horse for the ballot paper to help illiterate voters. There were few disagreements over policy between the parties.

== Results ==
Party	Votes	%	Seats	+/–
General People's Congress	1,175,343	43.10	187	+64
Al-Islah	637,728	23.39	53	–9
Nasserist Unionist People's Organisation	55,438	2.03	3	+2
Arab Socialist Ba'ath Party	20,409	0.75	2	–5
National Arab Socialist Ba'ath Party	10,134	0.37	0	New
Democratic Nasserist Party	9,601	0.35	0	–1
Party of Truth	5,587	0.20	0	–2
Nasserist Reform Organisation	2,755	0.10	0	0
League of Sons of Yemen	930	0.03	0	0
Other parties	3,400	0.12	0	0
Independents	805,636	29.54	54	+7
Vacant			2	–
Total	2,726,961	100.00	301	0
Valid votes	2,726,961	96.45		
Invalid/blank votes	100,408	3.55		
Total votes	2,827,369	100.00		
Registered voters/turnout	4,637,700	60.96		
Source: Nohlen et al.

== Aftermath ==
In two districts, Hajjah and Dhamar the results were cancelled due to irregularities. International monitors described the elections as being 'reasonably free and fair' and 'a positive step in the democratic development of Yemen'.

After the elections, 39 MPs elected as independents joined the GPC, 10 joined Al-Islah and two joined the Yemeni Socialist Party.
