= Social Nationalist Party – Yemen =

Yemeni nationalist political party

Social Nationalist Party – Yemen الحزب القومي الاجتماعي - اليمن
- Abbreviation: SNPY
- Leader: Abdul Aziz al-Bakir
- Founded: 3 February 1997
- Ideology: Yemeni nationalism Anti-Zionism; Anti-Americanism
- Political position: Syncretic
- Colours: Black; Red; White
- House of Representatives: 0 / 301

The Social Nationalist Party – Yemen (Arabic: الحزب القومي الاجتماعي - اليمن, al-Ḥizb al-Qawamī al-Ijtimā'ī - al-Yaman), is a Yemeni nationalist political party in Yemen. The party got its accreditation on 3 February 1997, its leader since then is Abdul Aziz al-Bakir. The party fiercely opposes the Saudi Arabian–led intervention in Yemen and underlines the territorial integrity as well as the history of Yemen which goes back thousands of years and which it claims reinforces the distinct Yemeni national identity.

The SNPY frequently condemns an "American-Zionist alliance", which it considers Saudi Arabia a part of, accuses it of trying to destroy Yemen and supports the former Syrian Government.

It condemned the interpretation of the Houthi government as an Iranian proxy, equating the Houthi side of the war with the Yemeni state instead and accusing Abdrabbuh Mansur Hadi of separatism. On 21 September 2021, SNPY's leader al-Bakir congratulated the "revolutionary leader" Abdul-Malik al-Houthi to the 7th anniversary of the Houthi takeover in Yemen, calling it a heroic resistance against external aggression.

== Election results ==
=== House of Representatives ===
| Election | Votes | % | Seats |
|---|---|---|---|
| 1993 | 124 | 0.01% | 0 / 301 |
| 2003 | 5,349 | 0.09% | 0 / 301 |

== See also ==
- List of political parties in Yemen
