= 1993 Yemeni parliamentary election =

First parliamentary election after Yemeni unification

- 27 April 1993
- All 301 seats in the House of Representatives; 151 seats needed for a majority
- Turnout: 84.82%
Party	Leader	Vote %	Seats
GPC	Ali Abdullah Saleh	28.69	123
YSP	Haidar Abu Bakr al-Attas	18.54	56
Al-Islah	Abdullah ibn Husayn al-Ahmar	17.14	62
Ba'ath Party		3.60	7
NUPO	Abdul Ghani Thabet	2.34	1
Party of Truth	Ahmad al-Shami	0.84	2
NRO		0.28	1
DNP		0.20	1
Independents	–	27.15	47
This lists parties that won seats. See the complete results below.

GPC: 20–30% 30–40% 40–50%
YSP: 20–30% 30–40% 40–50% 50–60% 60–70%
Prime Minister before	Prime Minister after
Haidar Abu Bakr al-Attas; YSP	Haidar Abu Bakr al-Attas; YSP

Parliamentary elections were held in Yemen on 27 April 1993, the first after Yemeni unification. The General People's Congress emerged as the largest party, winning 123 of the 301 seats. Voter turnout was 85%.

== Electoral system ==
The country continued to use the electoral system of North Yemen, with the 301 members of Parliament elected in single-member constituencies by first-past-the-post voting.

== Results ==
Party	Votes	%	Seats
General People's Congress	640,523	28.69	123
Yemeni Socialist Party	413,984	18.54	56
Al-Islah	382,545	17.14	62
Arab Socialist Ba'ath Party	80,362	3.60	7
Nasserist Unionist People's Organisation	52,303	2.34	1
Party of Truth	18,659	0.84	2
League of Sons of Yemen	16,155	0.72	0
Nasserist Reform Organisation	6,191	0.28	1
Democratic Nasserist Party	4,576	0.20	1
National Democratic Front	3,793	0.17	0
Union of Popular Forces	2,662	0.12	0
Unionist Assembly	1,855	0.08	0
Liberation Front	1,706	0.08	0
September Democrats	532	0.02	0
National Front Popular Organisation	148	0.01	0
Social Nationalist Party – Yemen	124	0.01	0
Revolutionary Democrats	78	0.00	0
Democratic Movement	71	0.00	0
The (Legal) Union	30	0.00	0
National Cohesion Conference	16	0.00	0
Democratic Front	15	0.00	0
Independents	606,201	27.15	47
Vacant			1
Total	2,232,529	100.00	301
Valid votes	2,232,529	97.91	
Invalid/blank votes	47,712	2.09	
Total votes	2,280,241	100.00	
Registered voters/turnout	2,688,323	84.82	
Source: Al-Bab

=== Performance of each Party ===
General People's Congress
1–10% 10–20% 20–30% 30–40% 40–50%

Yemeni Socialist Party
1–10% 10–20% 20–30% 30–40% 40–50% 50–60% 60–70%

Yemeni Congregation for Reform
<1% 1-10% 10-20% 20-30%

Arab Socialist Ba'ath Party - Yemen Region
<1% 1–5% 5–10%

Nasserist Unionist People's Organisation
<1% 1–5% 5-10%

Party of Truth
<1% 1–5% 5–10% 20-25%
