= Nasserist Unionist People's Organisation =

Nasserist Unionist People's Organisation التنظيم الوحدوي الشعبي الناصري
- General Secretary: Abdulmalik Al-Mekhlafi
- Founded: 25 December 1965 (60 years, 296 days)
- Headquarters: Sanaa
- Ideology: Nasserism; Yemeni unionism Secularism; Arab socialism Pan-Arabism
- Political position: Left-wing
- House of Representatives: 3 / 301

Website
- www.alwahdawi.net

The Nasserist Unionist People's Organisation (Arabic: التظيم الوحدوي الشعبي الناصري, Al-Tantheem Al-Wahdawi Al-Sha'abi Al-Nasseri) is a Nasserist political party in Yemen.

The party was founded in Taiz on 25 December 1965. The party was legalized in 1989.

In 1993 the party held its 8th conference. The conference elected an 89-member politburo. Abdul-Malik al-Mikhlafi was elected the new general secretary of the party, replacing Abdul Ghani Thabet. Thabet was general secretary of the party 1990–1993.

At the last legislative elections in 2003 the party won 1.85% of the popular vote and 3 out of 301 seats. The party has been a member of the opposition alliance known as the Joint Meeting Parties since its formation in the early 2000s.

The party publishes the newspaper al-Wahdawi.

In 2011, the party has participated in the Yemeni uprising against President Ali Abdullah Saleh.

== During the civil war ==
In the Yemeni Civil War, the party positioned itself strongly against the Houthi takeover from the beginning. Nasserists can be found for example in the 35th Armored Brigade, which operates in the area of al-Hujariyah south of Taiz. The city of Taiz is a traditional Nasserist stronghold. Once being the most powerful group in the city, it has lost influence to al-Islah in recent years. To this day, some important regional positions have stayed in the hands of NUPO, such as the post of the deputy governor of Taiz, which is held by Rashid al-Akhali. The NUPO in Taiz is poorly funded, most funds come through businessmen affiliated with the party. It has also received some support from the countries of the international coalition, but less so than other groups in the city.

== Electoral history ==
=== House of Representatives elections ===
Election	Party leader	Votes	%	Seats	+/–
1993	Abdul Ghani Thabet	52,303	2.34%	1 / 301	▲1
1997	Abdulmalik Al-Mekhlafi	55,438	2.3%	3 / 301	▲2
2003	Abdulmalik Al-Mekhlafi	109,480	1.85%	3 / 301	Steady

== See also ==
- Joint Meeting Parties
- List of political parties in Yemen
