= National Dialogue Conference (Yemen) =

Transitional dialogue process in Yemen

- Then-President Hadi Addressing the National Dialogue Conference
- Native name: مؤتمر الحوار الوطني الشامل
- Date: March 18, 2013 – January 24, 2014
- Duration: 10 months, 7 days
- Location: Mövenpick Hotel, Sanaa, Yemen; 15°21′43″N 44°13′55″E
- Outcome: Federalization of Yemen

The National Dialogue Conference (NDC) was a transitional dialogue process held at the Movenpick Hotel in Sanaa, Yemen from March 18, 2013 to January 24, 2014, as part of the Yemeni crisis reconciliation efforts.

National Dialogue is a key part of the agreement brokered by the UN and the Gulf Co-operation Council that saw long-time President Ali Abdullah Saleh hand over power to Abdrabbuh Mansour Hadi in November 2011 after an uprising. Mr Hadi was subsequently sworn in for a two-year term as president in February 2012 after an election in which he stood unopposed.

The UN's special envoy for Yemen, Jamal Benomar, described the conclusion of the National Dialogue Conference as a "historic moment". "After being on the brink of civil war, Yemenis negotiated an agreement for peaceful change, the only such in the region," he said. "The National Dialogue established a new social contract and opened a new page in the history of Yemen, breaking from the past and paving the way for democratic governance founded on the rule of law, human rights and equal citizenship," he added.

This negotiation resulted in an agreement that did not address the legitimate grievances of southern separatists or the Houthi coalition. The unpopularity of the transitional government and the general distrust of Hadi, who had profited from corruption as Saleh’s long time Vice President for nearly three decades, ensured its failure. After winning a show election in which he was the only candidate, Hadi stayed in power following the expiration of his 2 year mandate. This triggered Houthi incursions into Sanaa.

== Background ==
As part of the Gulf Cooperation Council Initiative that saw deposed president Ali Abdullah Saleh step down, a National Dialogue Conference was to be held. As part of the United Nations Security Council Resolution 2051, which stipulated the structure of the dialogue, the GCC Agreement was signed on November 23, 2011.

== Conference format ==
The NDC was divided into separate working groups, each with their own members. Groups were:

- The Southern Issue Working Group
- The Sa'ada Issue Working Group, the National Issues Working Group
- The National Reconciliation and Transitional Justice Working Group, the State-Building Working Group
- The Good Governance Working Group
- The Foundations for Building and the Role of the Armed and Security Forces Working Group
- The Independence of Special Entities Working Group
- The Rights and Freedoms Working Group
- The Development Working Group
- The Special Social and Environmental Issues Working Group
- The Formation of the Committee to Draft the Constitution Working Group
- The Assurance of Successful Implementation and Conference Outcomes Working Group

The NDC was headed by a nine-member presidency including President Abd Rabbu Mansour Hadi (NDC Chairman), Abdul-Kareem Al-Eryani (General People's Congress), Yassen Saeed No'man (Yemeni Socialist Party), Sultan Al-Atwani (Nasserite Unionist Party), Yassin Makkawi (Peaceful Southern Movement), Saleh bin Habra (Houthis), Abdul-Wahab Al-Ansi (Islah Party). Nadia Al-Sakkaf, and Abdullah Lamlas. The conference was overseen by Jamal Benomar, representative to the United Nations.

== Outcomes ==
Map of the proposed Federal Regions of Yemen.

The conference concluded on January 24, 2014 with the signing of the NDC Document, outlining the results of the conference. The document agreed to extend Hadi's presidency for another year so that he can carry out certain reforms and continue overseeing the transition process. It also called for the restructuring of parliament and the Shura Council, which will be composed of 50% northerners and 50% southerners. In terms of the Southern Issue, after 30 meetings during the course of the Dialogue, the Southern Issue Working Group was unable come up with a plan for a new political system that would fairly represent the south. In terms of the Sa'ada Issue, the document guaranteed freedom of religion, makes stipulations on the nonsectarian nature of the government, outlaws illegal financial or arms support from foreign powers, calls for a return of stolen government weapons, prohibits the possession of medium to heavy arms, and calls for addressing the feuds that have contributed to the conflict. These outcomes will be enshrined in the forthcoming constitution.

The Dialogue members also agreed that Yemen would be transformed into a 6-region federal system. The regions would be Azal, Saba, Janad and Tihama, Aden and Hadramawt. Sanaa will have a special status and not be part of any region. Aden, the former southern capital, would also have a special status. Azal, Saba, Janad and Tahama would be northern provinces where Aden and Hadramawt would be southern. The federal system was rejected by southern leaders including Mohammad Ali Ahmed, a member of the NDC who resigned after expressing frustration with the transitional process.

== Reactions ==
The European Union Foreign Affairs Council released a statement that the NDC "has set an example in the region" for transitional phases. Abdul Latif al-Zayani, the secretary general of the GCC, stated that the NDC was a positive development and that "the GCC States will continue to exert full efforts alongside regional and international parties to ensure the success of the political settlement in Yemen." Canadian Foreign Affairs Minister John Baird congratulated Hadi on the completion of the NDC and said in a statement, "the people of Yemen have clearly spoken for a more open society that respects freedom, democracy, human rights and the rule of law." The Turkish Ministry of Foreign Affairs stated that, "Turkey believes that the preparation for a new constitution in Yemen that secures the fundamental rights and freedoms and that has accordance with National Dialogue Conference resolutions is essential for a consistent and prosperous Yemen." United States State Department spokeswoman Marie Harf stated that "The debates, discussions and compromises throughout the National Dialogue process are evidence of the will of the Yemeni people to work together constructively for the future of their country." Houthi Leader Mohammad al-Bakhti rejected the outcomes document "because it divides Yemen into poor and wealthy regions." The final NDC session was also boycotted by Houthi leaders after the assassination of a Houthi representative to the NDC. Mohammad Ali Ahmed, a southern representative to the NDC who resigned in November 2013, stated that, "what has been announced about the six regions is a coup against what had been agreed at the (NDC) dialogue." Al-Hirak member Nasser al-Nawba rejected the NDC outcomes and stated that, "We will continue our peaceful struggle until we achieve independence." Most southern leaders boycotted the Dialogue from the beginning of the process.

== See also ==
- Federalization of Yemen
- Yemeni Civil War (1994)
- Yemeni Civil War (2014–present)
- List of modern conflicts in the Middle East
- Yemeni Revolution
- History of Yemen
