= 2003 Yemeni parliamentary election =

- 27 April 2003
- All 301 seats in the House of Representatives; 151 seats needed for a majority
- Turnout: 76.58% (▲15.62pp)
Party	Leader	Vote %	Seats	+/–
GPC	Ali Abdullah Saleh	57.79	229	+42
Al-Islah	Abdullah ibn Husayn al-Ahmar	22.51	45	−8
YSP	Ali Salih 'Ubad Muqbil	4.86	7	New
NUPO	Abdulmalik Al-Mekhlafi	1.83	3	0
Ba'ath Party	Qasim Salaam	0.68	2	0
GPC–Al-Islah	–	0.42	1	New
Independents	–	10.35	14	−40
This lists parties that won seats. See the complete results below.
Prime Minister before	Prime Minister after
Abdul Qadir Bajamal; GPC	Abdul Qadir Bajamal; GPC

Parliamentary elections were held in Yemen on 27 April 2003 to elect all 301 members of the House of Representatives for a six-year term. The elections had originally been scheduled to take place in 2001. The General People's Congress of President Ali Abdullah Saleh received 58% of the vote, increasing its majority in the parliament with 229 MPs.

As of 2026, these remain the most recent parliamentary elections in Yemen, as the country fell into civil war eleven years later.

== Campaign ==
The elections were conducted under a new electoral code, the General Elections and Referendum Law, which was adopted by Parliament in November 2000 and approved in a national referendum in February 2001. All 301 members of Parliament were elected from single-member constituencies using a first-past-the-post voting system. The official campaign period lasted from 8 April to 26 April.

Nineteen parties fielded a total of 991 candidates for the 301 seats in the House of Representatives, in addition to 405 independent candidates. Over eight million Yemeni citizens were registered to vote, with the number of registered women voters almost doubling since 1997 (3.4 million compared to 1.8 million).

== Conduct ==
Although the election was deemed to be more free and fair than in previous years, there were still concerns about the conduct of the vote. The National Democratic Institute noted that:

The atmosphere of anxiety in the run-up to the elections caused by fears of violence, as well as heavy-handed and coercive measures on and after election day by elements of the ruling GPC in many polling stations across the country are troubling. There were credible reports of election law violations including political intimidation, underage voting, improper behavior by security forces, vote buying and obstruction by ruling party counting commissioners.

== Results ==
The General People's Congress was immediately joined by 12 independents. Results in three seats were invalidated. Despite the increase in the number of women voters, only one woman was elected, down from two in the 1997 elections.

On 10 May 2003, the new House of Representatives convened its first meeting and re-elected Abdullah ibn Husayn al-Ahmar as its speaker.

Party	Votes	%	Seats	+/–
General People's Congress	3,465,117	57.79	229	+42
Al-Islah	1,349,485	22.51	45	–8
Yemeni Socialist Party	291,541	4.86	7	New
Nasserist Unionist People's Organisation	109,714	1.83	3	0
Arab Socialist Ba'ath Party	40,872	0.68	2	0
General People's Congress–Al-Islah	25,352	0.42	1	New
National Arab Socialist Ba'ath Party	23,745	0.40	0	0
Nasserist Reform Organisation	15,257	0.25	0	0
Union of Popular Forces	11,967	0.20	0	–
Democratic Nasserist Party	9,829	0.16	0	0
National Democratic Front	7,056	0.12	0	–
Social Nationalist Party – Yemen	5,349	0.09	0	–
Party of Truth	4,585	0.08	0	0
People's Democratic Party	4,077	0.07	0	–
Democratic Union of Popular Forces	3,003	0.05	0	–
Social Green Party	2,276	0.04	0	–
Popular Unity Party	1,739	0.03	0	–
Yemeni League Party	1,383	0.02	0	–
Liberation Front Party	1,282	0.02	0	–
Popular Unionist Liberation Party	1,241	0.02	0	–
Yemeni Unionist Gathering	483	0.01	0	–
Democratic September Organization	81	0.00	0	–
Independents	620,615	10.35	14	–40
Total	5,996,049	100.00	301	0
Valid votes	5,996,049	96.69		
Invalid/blank votes	205,205	3.31		
Total votes	6,201,254	100.00		
Registered voters/turnout	8,097,514	76.58		
Source: Yemen NIC
