= 1971 Yemen Arab Republic parliamentary election =

Parliamentary elections were held in the Yemen Arab Republic in February and March 1971. As political parties were banned, all candidates ran as independents.

The indirect election system in rural areas led to Parliament being dominated by tribal elites. However, it was suspended in 1974 after a military coup, in order to try to reduce the elite's power.

== Electoral system ==
Of the 159 members of Parliament, 128 were elected in single-member constituencies and 31 appointed by the President. However, secret elections only took place in urban areas, whilst indirect elections were held in rural areas, effectively barring women from voting.
