= 1991 Yemeni constitutional referendum =

- 15–16 May 1991

Results
Choice	Votes	%
Yes	1,341,247	98.50%
No	20,409	1.50%
Valid votes	1,361,656	99.77%
Invalid or blank votes	3,132	0.23%
Total votes	1,364,788	100.00%
Registered voters/turnout	1,890,646	72.19%

A constitutional referendum was held in Yemen on 15 and 16 May 1991. The new constitution was reportedly approved by 98.5% of voters, with a 72.2% turnout.

== Results ==
Choice	Votes	%
For	1,341,247	98.5
Against	20,409	1.5
Invalid/blank votes	3,132	–
Total	1,364,788	100
Registered voters/turnout	1,890,646	72.2
Source: Nohlen et al.
