= 2012 Yemeni presidential election =

- 21 February 2012
- Registered: 10,243,364
- Turnout: 64.78% (▼0.38pp)
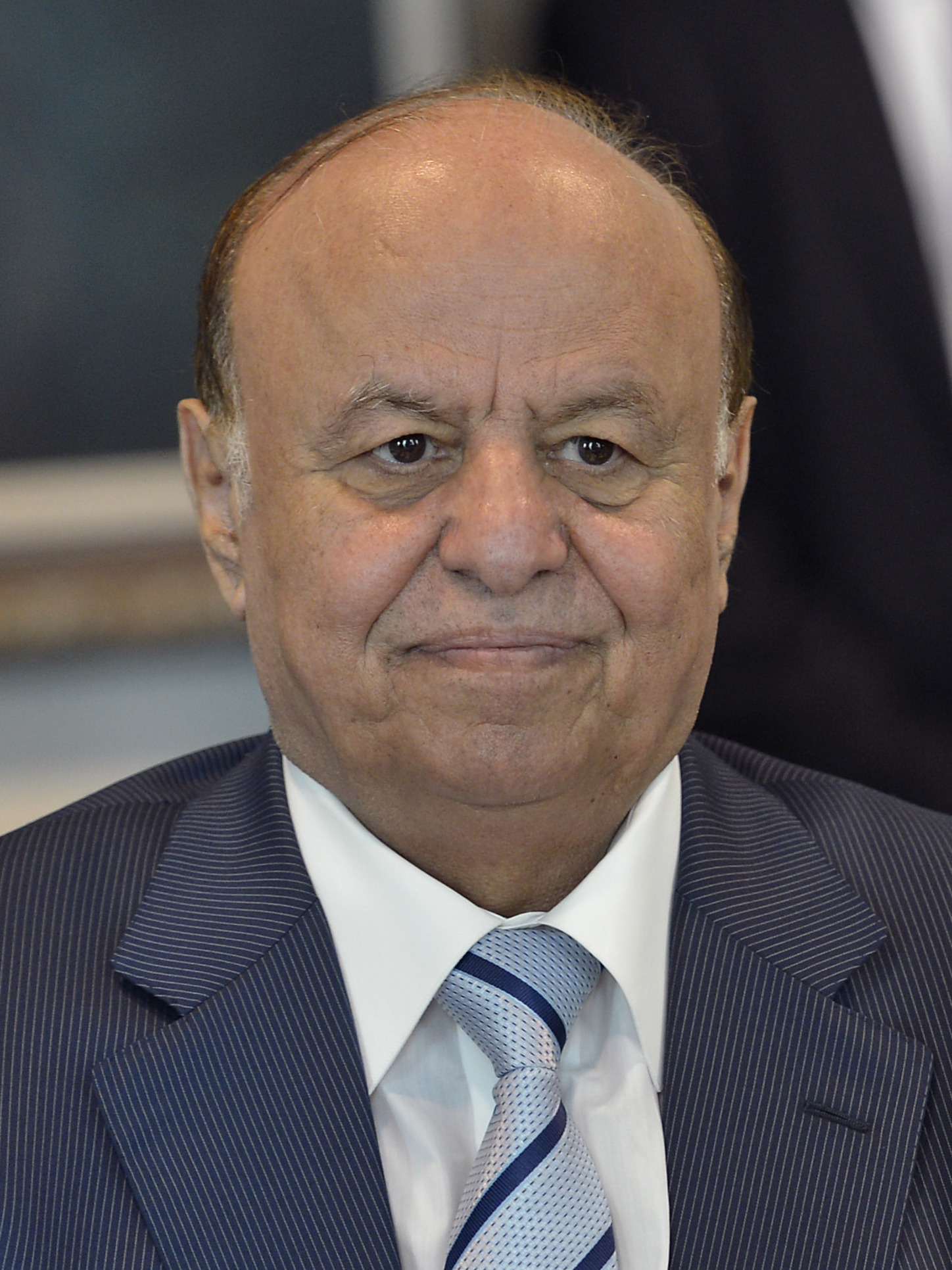
Nominee	Abdrabbuh Mansur Hadi
Party	GPC
Popular vote	6,621,921
Percentage	100%
- Results by governorate Hadi: 100%
President before election
Abdrabbuh Mansur Hadi (acting)
GPC
Elected President
Abdrabbuh Mansur Hadi
GPC

Presidential elections were held in Yemen on 21 February 2012. Acting President Abdrabbuh Mansur Hadi was the only candidate, and was subsequently sworn into office on 25 February 2012. As of 2025 this is the last presidential election in Yemen, as the country descended into civil war two years later.

== Background ==
During the Yemeni revolution, the Gulf Cooperation Council proposed an agreement whereby President Ali Abdullah Saleh would transfer his powers to Vice President Hadi. Saleh signed an agreement in Riyadh on 23 November 2011 under which he was to remain in office as a figurehead for up to three months, after which elections would be held. On 26 November, Hadi announced 21 February 2012 as the date for the elections.

== Campaign ==
According to Prime Minister Mohammed Basindawa, the main opposition Joint Meeting Parties coalition and the ruling General People's Congress jointly nominated Hadi as their consensus candidate.

The Houthis in northern Yemen called for a boycott of the vote, but said they would not stop those who wished to vote from doing so. In the same vein, the southern secessionists also called for a boycott. Yemeni police said they had arrested "hardliners" from the movement who sought to forcefully prevent people from voting.

== Poll-related violence ==
Despite the ongoing uprising and reactions that continued to cause violence, other poll related violence included at least two attacks near polling stations prior to the vote. One of the attacks occurred the day before the election in Aden, a stronghold of the Southern Movement seeking to secede and restore an independent South Yemen, that result in the death of one soldier. The Yemeni government warned that there was "certain" to be violent attempts to disrupt the vote. On election day, at least one security service personnel was killed in the southern al-Mansoura district. Further violence was reported in the south. Al-Qaeda in the Arabian Peninsula was also accused of attacking election committees.

== Results ==
According to Yemeni law, the final result was expected within ten days. Voter turnout was reported to be 65%.

Candidate	Party	Votes	%
Abdrabbuh Mansur Hadi	General People's Congress	6,621,921	100.00
Total		6,621,921	100.00
Valid votes		6,621,921	99.80
Invalid/blank votes		13,271	0.20
Total votes		6,635,192	100.00
Registered voters/turnout		10,243,364	64.78
Source: IFES

== Reactions ==
=== International ===
China – At a regular press briefing Foreign Ministry spokesman Hong Lei said "We hope relevant parties make joint efforts to ensure a peaceful and orderly political transitional process, to restore normal social order at an early date and realize national stability and development".

Cuba – President of the Council of State and Council of Ministers of Cuba Raúl Castro sent the elected president a congratulatory cable.

France – A Foreign Ministry statement said that France welcomed the holding of the presidential election, commended the Yemeni people for their mobilization and the conduct of the election, which for the most part was peaceful. It also addressed its congratulations to, and expressed its support for and trust in Hadi, however it recognized that serious acts of intimidation resulting in the loss of life were committed in certain southern governorates, notably in the city of Aden, in an attempt to jeopardize the success of the elections, strongly condemning these acts.

Russia – President of Russia Dmitry Medvedev sent a congratulatory telegram to Hadi, saying "We note with satisfaction that the Republic of Yemen is moving along the path of restoring stability and security and implementing a wide range of social and economic and democratic transformations based on a broad national dialog and in line with the aspirations of all of the country's citizens". Russian Foreign Ministry spokesman Alexander Lukashevich said "We hail the efforts of the Yemeni authorities who provided voting in the earlier stated date, as well as the active participation of the people (in the election process)".

Spain – The Spanish government welcomed the elections, considering it a major step towards the democratic transition and the start of a new phase in Yemen's history. The Spanish Foreign Ministry renewed in a statement its full support for democratic transition process in Yemen and confirmed its intention to continue to work with the Yemeni government and the various spectra of Yemeni society to face the future challenges in various fields.

Turkey – A Foreign Ministry statement welcomed the elections as a significant step and hoped the results of the elections would be beneficial for the Yemeni people. The statement added that "Turkey now expects a national dialogue conference to take place with participation of all seagments in Yemen".

United Kingdom – Foreign Minister William Hague welcomed the successful Yemeni election saying "Yemeni people made clear there is no place for violence in Yemen's democratic future".

United States – President Barack Obama told Hadi that the United States would be a steadfast partner and urged him to follow through on promises for a broad national dialogue, political reforms and elections by 2014.

United Nations – UN envoy Jamal Bin Omar, while visiting some of the polling stations in Sana'a said "The February 21st, is a historic day, and it protected Yemen from a civil war".

== Aftermath ==
Hadi took oath of office in the House of Representatives on 25 February. On the same day a suicide bomber detonated his vehicle outside a presidential palace in Mukalla, the capital of Hadhramaut Governorate, killing at least 26 members of the Republican Guard. Saleh formally ceded power to Hadi and stepped down on 27 February 2012.
