= 1988 Yemen Arab Republic parliamentary election =

Parliamentary elections were held in the Yemen Arab Republic on 5 July 1988. As political parties were banned, all 1,300 candidates for the 128 seats ran as independents. Around 40 seats were won by tribal candidates, whilst around 30 were won by candidates sympathetic to the Muslim Brotherhood. After the election, a further 31 members were appointed by the President. Voter turnout was 77%.

== Electoral system ==
Of the 159 members of Parliament, 128 were elected in single-member constituencies using the first-past-the-post system, with the remaining 31 appointed by the President.

== Results ==
Party	Votes	%	Seats
Independents			128
Appointed members			31
Total			159
Total votes	857,976	–	
Registered voters/turnout	1,113,334	77.06	
Source: Nohlen et al., IPU
