= Al Sahwa =

Weekly newspaper in Yemen

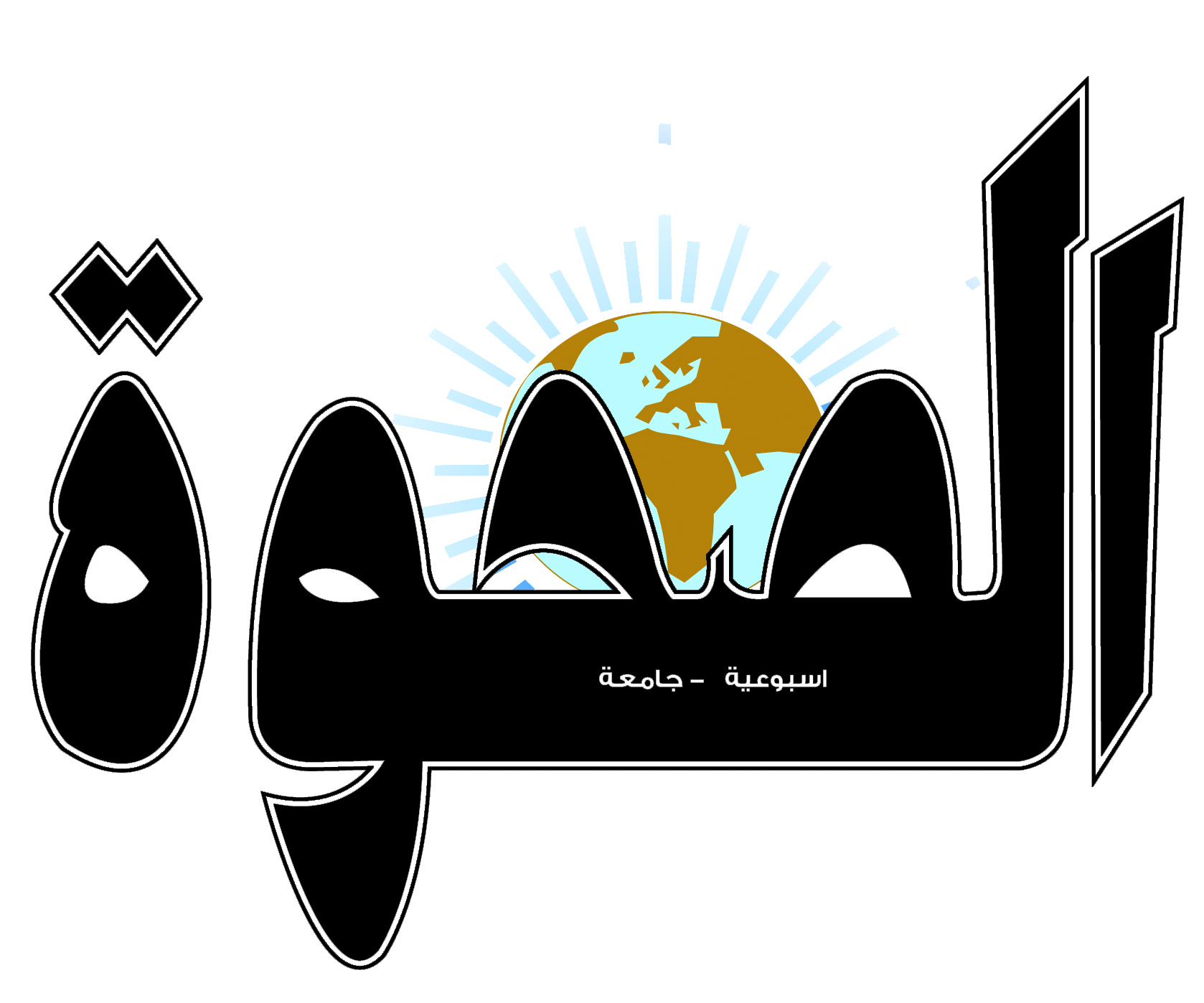
- Type: Weekly newspaper
- Editor-in-chief: Mohammad Alyosfi
- Founded: 1986; 40 years ago
- Political alignment: Islamist
- Language: Arabic
- Headquarters: Sana'a
- Country: Yemen
- Website: Al Sahwa

Al Sahwa (Arabic: الصحوة, lit. 'The Awakening - Alsahwa Official') is a weekly newspaper published in Sana'a, Yemen (formerly North Yemen). Founded in 1986 the paper has an Islamist political stance.

== History and profile ==
Al Sahwa was established in 1986. It is one of the official media outlets of the Islah Party. Although the paper is published weekly on Thursdays, its website is updated daily. As of 2014, Rajeh Badi was the editor-in-chief of the weekly.

The paper describes itself as the voice of Islamic movement in the country. Therefore, it offers the analysis of news from an Islamic angle.

The paper's online version was the 17th most visited website for 2010 in the MENA region.

The offices of Al Sahwa in Sana'a were attacked by gunmen in May 2011. The attacks were allegedly carried out by the Yemeni military forces loyal to former President Ali Abdullah Saleh.

== See also ==
- List of newspapers in Yemen
