= Arab Socialist Ba'ath Party – Yemen Region =

Political party in Yemen

Arab Socialist Ba'ath Party – Yemen Region حزب البعث العربي الاشتراكي - قطر اليمن
- Regional Secretary: Quasim Salaam
- Assistant Regional Secretary: Khalid al-Sabaei
- Founded: 1995; 31 years ago
- Headquarters: Sanaa
- Ideology: Neo-Ba'athism; Pan-Arabism; Secularism; Assadism
- Political position: Left-wing
- International affiliation: Syrian-led Ba'ath Party
- Colors: Black, Red, White and Green (Pan-Arab colors)
- House of Representatives: 1 / 301

Party flag

Website
- https://www.albaath.ye/

The Arab Socialist Ba'ath Party – Yemen Region (Arabic: حزب البعث العربي الاشتراكي - قطر اليمن Ḥizb al-Ba‘th al-‘Arabī al-Ishtirākī - Quṭr al-Yaman) is the Yemeni regional branch of the Arab Socialist Ba'ath Party. The regional secretary of the party in Yemen is Quasim Salaam.

== History and political activities ==
Ba'athism in Yemen originates back to the 1950s. The party carried out clandestine political activity until 1990. The party was officially registered as the 'Arab Socialist Ba'ath Party' on 31 December 1995, while the pro-Iraq party registered as the 'National Arab Socialist Ba'ath Party' in 1997.

The party contested the 1993 parliamentary election in alliance with the National Arab Socialist Ba'ath Party, winning seven seats. After the election, however, relations between the two Ba'athist groups soured and they contested further elections separately. In the 1997 and 2003 parliamentary elections, the party won two seats. In 2003, the party received 0.66% of the national vote. The party supported Ali Abdullah Saleh in the 1999 presidential election. In December 2008, the Arab Socialist Ba'ath Party and the National Arab Socialist Ba'ath Party agreed to again coordinate their political activities.

In November 2010 one of the key leaders of the party in Yemen, Ali Ahmad Nasser al-Dhahab, who was assistant general secretary of the Regional Command and Member of Parliament since 1993, died.

In 2011, the party participated in the Yemeni Revolution against President Ali Abdullah Saleh.

In March 2013, Linda Mohammed, the head of the region's Women section, left the party in protest at the Yemenite leadership's continued support for Bashar al-Assad and the Syrian Ba'ath.

On 5 January, 2020, they condemned the American drone strike that assassinated Qasem Soleimani and Abu Mahdi al-Muhandis, saying the two were martyred and that the attack threatened international and regional peace.

== Electoral history ==
=== House of Representatives elections ===
Election	Party leader	Votes	%	Seats	+/–
1993		80,362	3.60%	7 / 301	▲7
1997		20,409	0.7%	2 / 301	▼5
2003	Quasim Salaam	40,377	0.68%	2 / 301	Steady

== See also ==
- List of political parties in Yemen
