= Next Yemeni presidential election =

- TBD
Incumbent Chairman
Disputed between
Rashad al-Alimi (GPC) and
Mahdi al-Mashat (Houthis)

President Rashad al-Alimi was elected by the Presidential Leadership Council (PLC) since 7 April 2022. Presidential elections are expected to be held in Yemen at an undefined point in the future.
