= Party of Truth (Yemen) =

Zaydi Islamist political party in Yemen

Party of Truth حزب الحق
- Founder: Ahmad al-Shami
- Founded: 1990
- Ideology: Zaydi Islamism; Anti-Islah

Website
- Official website

The Party of Truth (Arabic: حزب الحق, romanized: Ḥizb al-Ḥaqq) is a Zaydi Shia Islamist organization and political party in Yemen.

== History ==
Established by Ahmad al-Shami in 1990 in order to oppose al-Islah, the party won two seats in the House of Representatives in the 1993 elections, the first after unification. The two elected representatives were Badreddin al-Houthi and Abdullah al-Ruzami, both of whom would go on to assume prominent roles in the Houthi movement during the 2000s. However, al-Houthi and al-Ruzami soon distanced themselves from the party, which they considered "elitist and co-opted by the Saleh regime".

The 1997 elections saw the Party of Truth's vote share drop from 0.8% to 0.2%, and it lost both seats. In 2002 it joined the opposition Joint Meeting Parties (JMP) alliance. It received only 0.1% of the vote in the 2003 elections, remaining without parliamentary representation.

In March 2007, the Saleh government tried to forcibly dissolve the Party of Truth, which it believed to have connections to the Houthis. Ahmad al-Shami and other party founders unilaterally sent a letter to the "Parties Affairs Committee" in which they announced the dissolution. However, this was rejected by the party leadership. The party continued operating and installed Hassan Zaid as new leader in al-Shami's place. It also remained a minor partner in the JMP as of 2008.

In November 2009, during the sixth of the Saada wars, the Houthis chose Hassan Zaid as an intermediary to negotiate with Saleh. Zaid later became the minister of youth and sports in the Houthi administration. He was shot and killed in October 2020, allegedly by a gang linked to the Saudi-led coalition.
