= Democratic Nasserist Party =

Democratic Nasserist Party الحزب الناصري الديمقراطي
- Ideology: Nasserism; Arab Nationalism; Arab Socialism; Pan-Arabism

The Democratic Nasserist Party (Arabic: الحزب الناصري الديمقراطي, al-Hizb al-Nasiri al-Dimuqrati) is a political party in Yemen.

== History ==
The party was set up in the 1960s by Egyptian intelligence service to win the support of Shafi'i muslims population that dominated Lower Yemen. It contested the 1993 parliamentary elections, nominating 17 candidates. Despite receiving only 0.2% of the vote, it won a seat in the House of Representatives. For the 1997 elections it put forward 33 candidates, and despite doubling its vote share, it lost parliamentary representation. It received 0.2% of the vote in the 2003 parliamentary elections, remaining seatless.

== Ideology ==
Although a Nasserist party, the party supports Sharia law and sees socialism as being compatible with Islam.
