= 1999 Yemeni presidential election =

- 23 September 1999
- Turnout: 67.48%

Nominee	Ali Abdullah Saleh	Najeeb Qahtan al-Shaabi
Party	GPC	Independent
Popular vote	3,584,399	141,481
Percentage	96.20%	3.80%
- Results by governorate
President before election
Ali Abdullah Saleh
GPC
Elected President
Ali Abdullah Saleh
GPC

Direct presidential elections were held in Yemen for the first time on 23 September 1999. Candidates had to be approved by at least 10% of the 301 members of the House of Representatives; however, in practice this meant that only two parties, the ruling General People's Congress (GPC) and al-Islah had enough seats to nominate their candidates. However, al-Islah backed the GPC candidate, incumbent President Ali Abdullah Saleh rather than running a candidate of their own.

The only candidates that received approval from Parliament were Saleh and Najeeb Qahtan al-Shaabi, another member of the GPC. The main opposition candidate, Ali Saleh Obad of the Yemeni Socialist Party, failed to gain enough support in the House of Representatives; his party subsequently boycotted the elections. The reported voter turnout of 67% was contested by the opposition.

== Nominations ==
Nominations for presidential candidates closed on 13 July 1999. In total, 31 candidates put their names forward, though three of them were disqualified immediately for failing to meet the legal requirements:

1. Ali Abdullah Saleh – supported by the General People's Congress, Al-Islah, National Opposition Council.
2. Ali Salih 'Ubad "Muqbil" – secretary-general of the Yemeni Socialist Party. Supported by parties in the Supreme Co-ordination Council for the Opposition
3. Abd al-Quwi Ahmad Hamoud Shuwi'a – supported by the People's Democratic Party
4. Al-Habbani Muhammad abd al-Malik Nu'man al-'Abassi – supported by the Yemeni Popular Unity Party
5. Ali bin Ali Sabihi
6. Muhammad Muhammad Hizam al-Yamani
7. Amin Ahmad Thabit
8. Abd al-Wahhab Muhammad Hassan al-Karidi
9. Abdullah Salih Salih al-Bakhiti
10. Muhammad Ahmad Sa'ad al-Dhufari
11. Faisal Ali Ahmad Ghaaithan al-Tawil
12. Salih Hassan Abdullah al-'Azani
13. Abd al-Malik Yahya Ahmad Hanash
14. Ahmad Ali Hussein Yahya al-'Amri
15. Muhammad A'id Qa'id al-'Uthmali
16. Ali Salih al-Houri
17. Muhammad Ali Muhsin al-Sirri
18. Salih Ahmad bin Ahmad Jubah
19. Muhammad Hussein al-Jamuzi
20. Ali Abdullah Salih Muhsin Suroub
21. Abd al-Wahhab Qanaf Sha'if
22. Mustafa Youssef Khalil
23. Iskandar Ali al-Nathari
24. Mustafa Ali Naji 'Aiyash
25. Ahmad Muslih al-Barti
26. Ma'adh Abdullah al-Shahani
27. Ahmad Abduh al-Ramim
28. Najeeb Qahtan al-Shaabi – MP for the General People's Congress, running as an independent

The following were disqualified:

1. Amin Ahmad bin Ahmad Thabit (candidates must not be married to a foreigner and he had a Russian wife)
2. Abdullah Salih Salih Muhsin Surub (minimum age is 40, he was 38)
3. A candidate with a name too similar to President Saleh

The parliamentary vetting committee eliminated another four candidates, putting 24 of the 31 nominations to a parliamentary vote, in which a candidate required 31 votes to be able to run in the elections. Another candidate, Khalid al-Zarraka, did not appear on the publicised list of nominations, but was included in the parliamentary vote. Only two candidates managed to obtain the required number of votes; Saleh and Najeeb Qahtan al-Shaabi. Twenty-one of the 25 candidates (including al-Zarraka) did not receive any votes.

Candidate	Votes	%
Ali Abdullah Saleh	182	60.47
Najeeb Qahtan al-Shaabi	39	12.96
Khalid al-Zarraka	25	8.31
Ali Salih 'Ubad Muqbil	7	2.33
Other candidates	0	0.00
Abstentions	1	0.33
Absent	47	15.61
Total	301	100.00
Source: Al-Bab

== Results ==
Candidate	Party	Votes	%
Ali Abdullah Saleh	General People's Congress	3,584,399	96.20
Najeeb Qahtan al-Shaabi	Independent	141,481	3.80
Total		3,725,880	100.00
Valid votes		3,725,880	98.75
Invalid/blank votes		47,011	1.25
Total votes		3,772,891	100.00
Registered voters/turnout		5,591,422	67.48
Source: Nohlen et al.
