= Nasserist Reform Organisation =

Nasserist Reform Organisation تنظيم التصحيح الشعبي الناصري
- Founded: 1991
- Ideology: Nasserism; Arab Nationalism; Arab Socialism; Pan-Arabism

The Nasserist Reform Organisation (Arabic: تنظيم التصحيح الشعبي الناصري, Tanzim at-Tashikh ash-Shabi an-Nasiri) is a political party in Yemen. It is led by Mujahed al-Quhali.

== History ==
The party was established in 1991 as a merger of the Democratic United Corrective Front and the Nasserite Organisation of Yemen. Despite having an estimated membership of around 100,000, it received only 6,170 votes in the 1993 elections, winning one seat in the House of Representatives. However, the 1997 elections saw its vote share drop from 0.3% to 0.1%, and it lost its parliamentary representation. Despite a small increase in its vote share, it remained seatless following the 2003 elections.
