= Al-Islah (Yemen) =

Yemeni Congregation for Reform التجمع اليمني للإصلاح
- Chairperson: Mohammed al-Yadoumi
- Deputy Chairperson: Abdul Wahab al-Ansi
- Founders: Abdullah ibn Husayn al-Ahmar; Ali Mohsen al-Ahmar; Abdul Majeed al-Zindani; Mohammed al-Yadumi
- Founded: 13 September 1990 (36 years, 62 days)
- Headquarters: Sanaa
- Ideology: Islamic fundamentalism; Sunni Islamism; Wahhabism; Conservatism; Anti-communism; Federalism (Yemen); Republicanism; Factions: Anti-Shia sentiment; Tribalism
- Political position: Right-wing
- Religion: Sunni Islam (Salafism)
- International affiliation: Muslim Brotherhood (alleged, denied)
- Colours: Blue
- House of Representatives: 44 / 301

Party flag

Website
- alislah-ye.net

Al-Islah militia
- ميليشيا الإصلاح
- Founded: 1990
- Dates active: 1990-present
- Active regions: Yemen
- Status: Active
- Size: Unknown
- Wars: Yemeni Civil War (2015-present)

The Yemeni Congregation for Reform, frequently called al-Islah (pronounced [alʔisˤlaːħ]; Arabic: التجمع اليمني للإصلاح, romanized: at-Tajammu’u al-Yamanī lil-Iṣlāḥ), is a Yemeni Islamist movement established in 1990 by Abdullah ibn Husayn al-Ahmar, Ali Mohsen al-Ahmar, Abdul Majeed al-Zindani, with Ali Saleh's blessing. Islah is more of a loose coalition of tribal and religious elements than a political party. Its origins are in the Islamic Front, a Muslim Brotherhood affiliated militia supported by Saudi Arabia to combat the Marxist National Democratic Front during the Cold War.

The Islamic Front regrouped after the unification of Yemen in 1990 under the banner of the Islah Party with considerable financial backing from Saudi Arabia. It has been identified as a client of Saudi Arabia, and since the civil war in Yemen, Saudi Arabia has forged even closer relations with the group.

The Joint Meeting Parties came into existence in 2003 when Islah and the Socialist Party joined three other smaller parties to establish a joint opposition to the ruling General People's Congress. At the last legislative elections on 27 April 2003, the party won 22.6% of the popular vote and 46 out of 301 seats.

While Islah was nominally affiliated with Muslim Brotherhood network, in practice, it was ideologically dominated by the pro-Saudi Wahhabi trend. Islah has also denied any formal affiliation with the Muslim Brotherhood.

== Foundation ==
The party was created on 13 September 1990 in Sana'a, Yemen, by the tribal sheikh Abdullah Al Ahmar.

== General structure, leadership ==
Al-Islah has been described as consisting of three components. The first is the political faction, Yemen's Muslim Brotherhood, led by Mohammed Qahtan. The second is the tribal confederacy which was led by top tribal chief Abdullah Al Ahmar until his death in 2007 at which time he was succeeded by his son Sadeq. The third was the Wahhabi faction associated with Abdul Majeed al-Zindani, which operated a network of educational institutions. Muhammad Al-Yadomi succeeded Al Ahmar as the head of the party following his death on 28 December 2007. From the outset, the Muslim Brotherhood-linked faction's remained distinct from both al-Zindani's Wahhabi current and the tribal base associated with al-Ahmar. While Muslim Brotherhood supporters viewed Islah as a platform to advance their political goals, they differed significantly from Zindani's Wahhabi ideology and were neither part of his network nor integrated into Ahmar's tribal constituency.

The Islah party has denied allegations of links to the Muslim Brotherhood organization and has issued official statements on multiple occasions - in 2013, 2016, 2018, and 2025 - distancing itself from the Muslim Brotherhood organization. At an event organized by the British think tank Chatham House in December 2025, Abdul Razzaq al-Hijri, head of the parliamentary bloc of the Yemeni Islah Party, denied allegations linking the party to the Muslim Brotherhood. He described the party as a civil political organization with Yemeni roots and orientation, founded by individuals from diverse segments of Yemeni society under the leadership of Abdullah ibn Husayn al-Ahmar, citing earlier party literature. Al-Hijri further stated that the party's position regarding its non-affiliation with the Muslim Brotherhood had previously been expressed by the chairman of its Supreme Authority in a 1995 interview with As-Safir newspaper and by its Secretary-General in an interview with Al Jazeera during the 1990s.

In the 2003 parliamentary election, Al-Islah won 46 seats. As of 2010, 13 of Al-Islah's parliament members were women, including human rights activist and Nobel laureate Tawakel Karman, who created the activist group Women Journalists Without Chains in 2005 and became the first Yemeni and Arab woman to win the Nobel Peace Prize in 2011. On 5 February 2018, she was suspended from the party.

As of 2014 the party was the second biggest political party after the General People's Congress (GPC).

== Publications ==
The party has two major media outlets, Al Sahwa, an Arabic daily newspaper, and Suhail TV. The latter is owned by Hamid al-Ahmar, a relative of the party's founder.

== Relations with Saudi Arabia and the UAE ==
Since its party platform was dominated by the pro-Saudi Wahhabi trend, al-Islah movement's ideology differed considerably from that of other Muslim Brotherhood branches. Its leaders have regularly praised Saudi monarchs and are supportive of Saudi state policies. Schools and colleges operated by the Islah movement have been financially supported by Saudis; and photos of Saudi kings are often raised in its party rallies.

The party was blacklisted by Saudi Arabia in March 2014 due to its ties to the Muslim Brotherhood. Since the death of former King Abdullah bin Abdulaziz, Saudi Arabia has repaired relations with Al-Islah, due to their role in fighting the Houthis during the Yemeni Civil War. In December 2017, Islah leaders Al-Yidoumi and Al-Anisi met with the crown princes of Saudi Arabia and Abu Dhabi (part of the UAE) in the Saudi capital Riyadh to discuss the Yemeni war.

Before that, the UAE had publicly opposed Al-Islah, and it was later claimed that the UAE hired Israeli and American mercenaries to assassinate people like Al-Islah leader Mayo. In December 2018, it was reported that Sunni Islamist political parties like Al-Islah and jihadi militant groups like Al-Qaeda and Islamic State (ISIS) were the main targets of the UAE, with the Shia Houthis no longer being regarded as the greatest enemy of the UAE, and the Saudis being unable to do anything about it.

== Electoral history ==
=== House of Representatives elections ===
Election	Party leader	Votes	%	Seats	+/–	Position
1993	Abdullah ibn Husayn al-Ahmar	382,545	17.14%	62 / 301	▲62	▲2nd
1997	Abdullah ibn Husayn al-Ahmar	637,728	23.4%	53 / 301	▼9	2nd
2003	Abdullah ibn Husayn al-Ahmar	1,333,394	22.55%	46 / 301	▼7	2nd

== See also ==
- Houthi movement
- List of political parties in Yemen
- Southern Movement
- Yemeni Crisis (2011–present)
- List of Islamic political parties
