= Abdulmalik Al-Mekhlafi =

Yemeni politician (born 1959)

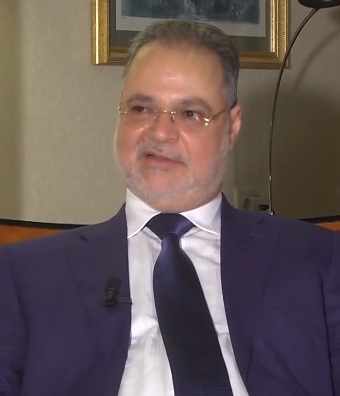
- Al-Mekhlafi, Interviewed by Belqees TV on 27 December 2017

Deputy Prime Minister of Yemen
- In office 1 December 2015 – 24 May 2018 Serving with Ahmed bin Ahmed Maisari
- President: Abdrabbuh Mansur Hadi
- Prime Minister: Khaled Bahah; Ahmed Obeid bin Daghr

Minister of Foreign Affairs of Yemen
- In office 1 December 2015 – 24 May 2018
- President: Abdrabbuh Mansur Hadi
- Prime Minister: Khaled Bahah; Ahmed Obeid bin Daghr
- Preceded by: Riad Yassin
- Succeeded by: Khaled al-Yamani

Personal details
- Born: Abdulmalik Abduljalil Al-Mekhlafi; August 19, 1959 (age 67) Taiz, Yemen
- Party: Nasserist Unionist People's Organisation

Abdulmalik Abduljalil Al-Mekhlafi (Arabic: عبد الملك عبد الجليل المخلافي; born 19 August 1959) is a former advisor to the president of the Republic of Yemen. He formerly served as deputy prime minister and foreign minister.

== Early life ==
He was born in the village of Husˤin in the Mekhlaf of Shara'b As Salam, Taiz Province on 19 August 1959. He received his early education from his grandfather Faqih Ali Radman Mekhlafi. He earned a Bachelor of law degree in 1984.

In 1978 Mekhlafi worked in private journalism, especially the student corner in The Republic Newspaper. He also worked on the student program broadcast in Taiz. From 1979 to 1981 he again worked as a journalist for The Republic.

== Politics ==
At age fifteen he joined the Nasserist Unionist People's Organisation of Yemen. From 1977-81 he held various positions in the party. In 1981 he became a member of the group's executive leadership and supervisor of the group's official newspaper. He was elected secretary-general of the group in July 1982 at age 23, a difficult period for the organization, just after the October movement failed. In 1985 he served as the chairman of the Committee on Foreign Relations. In September 1993 he served as Secretary General of the organization after political parties were legalized in Yemen.

He was a founding member of the Arab National Conference in 1990 and was repeatedly elected to the Secretariat and the Executive Committee of the National Conference. He was the founder of the Islamic National Conference member in 1994 and a member of the Coordinating Committee and follow-up of the conference previously. Thereafter he help multiple political and governmental positions.

- 1992: In the Supreme Committee for Elections 5/1993 Member: Grant degree Minister, at the same time apologized for the membership of the Supreme Committee for Elections because of disagreement with the freezing of his political party work.
- 1997: Adviser for (then president) Ali Abdullah Saleh, for elections, on the demand of the oppositions and agreement with the ruling party
- 5/1997: Member of the Advisory Board.
- 2001 a member of the Shura Council
- 2012: Secretary General of the Arab National Conference (OIC)
- 2013: Member of the National Dialogue Conference
- 2014: the president, Abdrabbuh Mansur Hadi adviser
- 2015: Deputy Prime Minister/ Minister Of Foreign Affairs

== See also ==
- List of foreign ministers in 2017
- List of current foreign ministers
