= Abdullah ibn Husayn al-Ahmar =

Yemeni politician and tribe leader

Sheikh Abdullah al-Ahmar
- عبد الله الأحمر
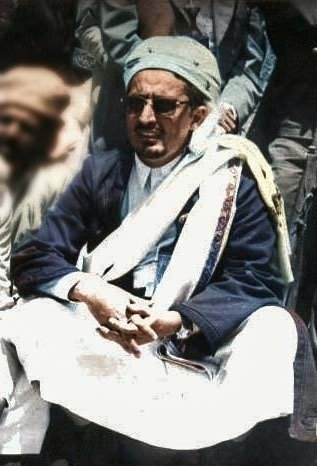
- Abdullah al-Ahmar

President of the House of Representatives of Yemen
- In office 15 June 1993 – 29 December 2007
- Preceded by: Yasin Said Numan
- Succeeded by: Yahya Ali al-Raee

President of the North Yemen legislature
- In office 1969–1975
- Preceded by: New office
- Succeeded by: Abdul Karim Abdullah al-Arashi

Personal details
- Born: 1 November 1933
- Died: 29 December 2007 (aged 74)

Abdullah ibn Husayn ibn Nasser al-Ahmar (Arabic: عبد الله بن حسين بن ناصر الأحمر) (1 November 1933 – 29 December 2007) was a Yemeni politician and tribal leader. He was the Speaker of the House of Representatives (Yemen) from 1993 to 2007 and also the Sheikh of the Hashid tribal federation and the Al-Islah party.

He inherited the position of Sheikh (elder) of the Hashid tribal federation from his father, Husayn Bin Nasser al-Ahmar, who was executed on the orders of Imam Ahmad bin Yahya. As a result, during the North Yemen Civil War Abdullah al-Ahmar sided with the Republicans against the Royalists and was appointed governor of Hajjah, but he refused to join the Egyptian-backed government of Abdullah as-Sallal. After Egypt withdrew from Yemen, he helped topple the Sallal government and his tribes provided crucial support to the new regime of Abdul Rahman al-Iryani against the Royalists.

In 1970, the civil war ended with the abolition of the monarchy and al-Ahmar became first the president of new National Council (1969–1971), and then the president of Shura Council (1971–1975).

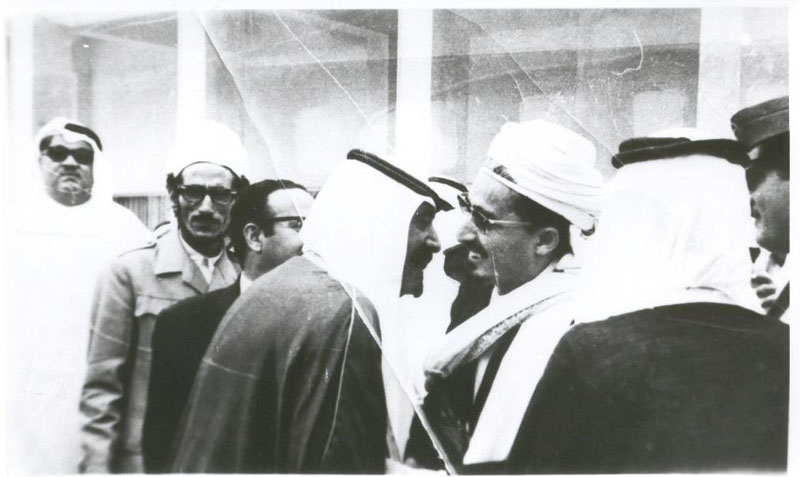
Patriarch of Hashid tribal confederation with then Prince Mohammad bin Ahmad Al-Sudairy of Saudi Arabia in 1973

When Colonel Ibrahim al-Hamdi seized power in 1974, he tried to limit the representation of the tribal leaders, which led to an open rebellion by the Hashid tribes. After the assassination of Hamdi in 1977, Saudi Arabia helped bring about a reconciliation between the tribes and the new government in 1978, first under Ahmad al-Ghashmi and then under Ali Abdullah Saleh. Ali Abdullah Saleh also belonged to the Hashid tribal confederation. Abdullah Al-Ahmar was appointed to the Constituent People's Assembly.

Although he opposed the government of South Yemen, al-Ahmar supported the 1990 unification of North and South Yemen and formed the Islah Party, which represents tribal as well as Islamic interests. The Islah Party won 62 seats out of 301 in the parliamentary elections of 1993, in which it ran in coalition with President Saleh's People General Congress (PGC), and al-Ahmar was elected speaker of parliament. In 1997, the party won 56 seats and al-Ahmar was re-elected speaker of parliament. Though his party won only 45 seats in the 2003 elections and was no longer in coalition with the PGC (which won a majority of 225 seats), al-Ahmar was re-elected speaker of parliament; he was again re-elected to that post in 2007.

Al-Ahmar died of cancer on 29 December 2007, aged 74, at the King Faisal Specialist Hospital in Riyadh, Saudi Arabia. Three days of mourning were declared for al-Ahmar, who was considered Yemen's second most powerful person.

His son Sadiq al-Ahmar succeeded him in the positions of the Sheikh of the Hashid tribal federation and the Al-Islah tribal confederacy, and remains in those positions intact.

He and his family, like many north Yemenis, are "Zaydi by parentage and Sunni by denominational conversion via partisan affiliation with Islah."
