= House of Representatives (Yemen) =

Lower house of the legislature of Yemen

Coordinates: 15.3463°N 44.1730°E

House of Representatives مجلس النواب اليمني

Type
- Type: Lower house Unicameral (1990–2001)

History
- Founded: 1990

Leadership
- Speaker: Sultan al-Barakani, General People's Congress since 13 April 2019

Structure
- Seats: 301
- Political groups: Last elected: General People's Congress (170); Yemeni Congregation for Reform (44); Yemeni Socialist Party (8); Nasserist Unionist People's Organisation (3); Ba'ath Party (1); Independents (43); Vacants (32)
- Committees: Unknown
- Joint committees: Unknown

Elections
- Voting system: First past the post
- First election: 27 April 1993
- Last election: 27 April 2003
- Next election: TBD (indefinitely postponed)

Website
- (Aden government) (Sanaa government)

The House of Representatives (Majlis al-Nuwaab) is the lower house of the Parliament of Yemen. It shares the legislative power with the Shura Council, the upper house. The Assembly of Representatives has 301 members, elected for a six-year term in single-seat constituencies. It is one of the rare parliamentary chambers in the world to currently have no female representation.

The House of Representatives was established in 1990 after the unification of Yemen for a transitional period. An election hasn't been held for the body since 2003. An election was set for 27 April 2009, but president Ali Abdullah Saleh postponed it by two years on 24 February 2009. However, the election did not take place on 27 April 2011, and was again postponed until the next presidential election.

A special presidential election was held in 2012 following the Yemeni Revolution, the President Saleh was resigned, and the election leading to the inauguration of Abdrabbuh Mansour Hadi as the new President of the Republic.

In January 2014, the final session of the National Dialogue Conference (NDC) announced that elections had been delayed, and would occur within 9 months of a referendum on a new constitution which had yet to be drafted. However both the GPC and Houthi representatives on the National Authority for Monitoring the Implementation of NDC Outcomes have refused to vote on the new constitution drafted by the constitution drafting committee, which submitted it in January 2015.

Since the Yemeni civil war began in September 2014, the House of Representatives had held semi-regular sessions in Sanaa. In February 2015, the Houthis briefly dissolved parliament before reportedly agreeing to reinstate the 301-member assembly in UN-brokered talks. Under the agreement, it will be augmented by a "people's transitional council" serving as the upper house.

On 13 April 2019, the first session was held in Seiyun, in President Hadi-controlled Hadhramaut Governorate.

The President Hadi resigned on April 7, 2022, after transferring his presidential powers to the Presidential Leadership Council (PLC), an eight-member body. The PLC officially assumed power on April 17, 2022. The chairman of the PLC, Rashad al-Alimi, became the new President of the Republic of Yemen. Consequently, since 2022, the functions of the House of Representatives are temporarily exercised by the Presidential Leadership Council (PLC), which also serves as a presidential, political, and parliamentary coordination body, pending Next Yemeni parliamentary election.

== Latest elections ==
The last parliamentary election in Yemen took place in 2003.

| Party | Votes | % | Seats | +/– |
|---|---|---|---|---|
| General People's Congress | 3,465,117 | 57.79 | 229 | +42 |
| Al-Islah | 1,349,485 | 22.51 | 45 | –8 |
| Yemeni Socialist Party | 291,541 | 4.86 | 7 | New |
| Nasserist Unionist People's Organisation | 109,714 | 1.83 | 3 | 0 |
| Arab Socialist Ba'ath Party | 40,872 | 0.68 | 2 | 0 |
| General People's Congress–Al-Islah | 25,352 | 0.42 | 1 | New |
| National Arab Socialist Ba'ath Party | 23,745 | 0.40 | 0 | 0 |
| Nasserist Reform Organisation | 15,257 | 0.25 | 0 | 0 |
| Union of Popular Forces | 11,967 | 0.20 | 0 | – |
| Democratic Nasserist Party | 9,829 | 0.16 | 0 | 0 |
| National Democratic Front | 7,056 | 0.12 | 0 | – |
| Social Nationalist Party – Yemen | 5,349 | 0.09 | 0 | – |
| Party of Truth | 4,585 | 0.08 | 0 | 0 |
| People's Democratic Party | 4,077 | 0.07 | 0 | – |
| Democratic Union of Popular Forces | 3,003 | 0.05 | 0 | – |
| Social Green Party | 2,276 | 0.04 | 0 | – |
| Popular Unity Party | 1,739 | 0.03 | 0 | – |
| Yemeni League Party | 1,383 | 0.02 | 0 | – |
| Liberation Front Party | 1,282 | 0.02 | 0 | – |
| Popular Unionist Liberation Party | 1,241 | 0.02 | 0 | – |
| Yemeni Unionist Gathering | 483 | 0.01 | 0 | – |
| Democratic September Organization | 81 | 0.00 | 0 | – |
| Independents | 620,615 | 10.35 | 14 | –40 |
| Total | 5,996,049 | 100.00 | 301 | 0 |
| Valid votes | 5,996,049 | 96.69 | | |
| Invalid/blank votes | 205,205 | 3.31 | | |
| Total votes | 6,201,254 | 100.00 | | |
| Registered voters/turnout | 8,097,514 | 76.58 | | |
Source: Yemen NIC

== See also ==
- List of speakers of the House of Representatives of Yemen
- Politics of Yemen
- List of legislatures by country
