= Attyal district =

Coordinates: 15°23′N 44°30′E

Attyal District الطيال
- District
- Interactive map of Attyal District
- Country: Yemen
- Governorate: Sana'a

Population (2003)
  - Total: 36,253
- Time zone: UTC+3 (Yemen Standard Time)

Attyal District (Arabic: مديرية الطيال) is a district of the Sana'a Governorate, Yemen. As of 2003, the district had a population of 36,253 inhabitants. Hajrat Shawkan village is in this district.
