= General People's Congress (Yemen) =

Ruling party of Yemen since 1993

General People's Congress المؤتمر الشعبي العام
- Chairperson (disputed): Rashad al-Alimi; (pro-Hadi/Alimi faction); Sadeq Amin Abu Rass; (pro-Houthi faction); Ahmed Saleh; (pro-Ahmed Saleh faction)
- Spokesperson: Abdo al-Janadi
- Founder: Ali Abdullah Saleh
- Founded: 24 August 1982 (44 years, 84 days)
- Headquarters: Sanaa
- Newspaper: Al-Motamar
- Ideology: Arab nationalism; Moderation; Big tent; Factions: Islamism; Yemeni nationalism; Tribalism; Religious conservatism; Historically: Neoliberalism; Revolutionarism
- Political position: Centre; Historically, now faction: Big tent
- House of Representatives: 170 / 301

Party flag

Website
- almotamar.net (pro-Houthi); almethaqnews.com (pro-Hadi/Alimi)

The General People's Congress (GPC; Arabic: المؤتمر الشعبي العام) is a political party in Yemen. It has been the de jure ruling party of Yemen since 1993, three years after unification. The party is dominated by a nationalist line, and its official ideology is Arab nationalism, seeking Arab unity.

In the course of the Yemeni civil war, the party's founder and Leader, Ali Abdullah Saleh, was killed, while the GPC fractured into three factions backing different sides in the conflict.

== History ==
The party was established on 24 August 1982 in Sanaa, North Yemen, by North Yemen President Ali Abdullah Saleh, becoming an umbrella organisation that sought to represent all political interests. Following Yemeni unification in 1990, and with Saleh continuing as president of the united country, it emerged as the largest party in the 1993 parliamentary elections, winning 123 of the 301 seats. It went on to win a majority (187) of seats in the 1997 elections amidst a boycott by the Yemeni Socialist Party.

GPC banner hung over a building in Sanaa, 2006

Saleh was re-elected as president in the first direct presidential elections in 1999, and the party won a landslide victory in the 2003 parliamentary elections, winning 226 of the 301 seats. Following the elections, several independent MPs also joined the party. Saleh was re-elected again in 2006. On 25 February 2012, he resigned from the presidency as a result of the Yemeni protests (2011-2012), and Abdrabbuh Mansur Hadi of the same party was elected as his successor. Saleh attempted to regain power over the country and the GPC Party in the following 2014 civil war. Rallying a large part of the GPC in 2015, he sided with the Houthis and effectively split the party into a pro-Hadi and a pro-Saleh faction.

The two factions were at war with each other until Saleh attempted to overthrow the Houthis. This power grab failed, however, and the former president, as well as party secretary general Aref al-Zouka, were killed in the Battle of Sanaa in late 2017. Following Ali Abdullah Saleh's death, the GPC fractured further, with a large part of the former Saleh followers pledging allegiance to the Houthis. This pro-Houthi part of the GPC continued to support the rebel government in Sanaa, and elected Sadeq Ameen Abu Rass as the new GPC chairman. One member of the pro-Houthi faction explained that "Ali Abdullah Saleh was killed by the Houthis. If we follow his direction and resist the Houthis, we will meet the same end as Saleh. So we prefer to support the strongest force on the ground."

Another group of Saleh loyalists fled from the Houthis. Though this GPC faction then allied itself with Hadi and the Saudi Arabia-led international coalition, it still remained completely separate and chose Ali Abdullah Saleh's son, Ahmed Saleh, as new de facto leader. Meanwhile, the former president's nephew, Tareq Saleh, began to organize a new private army for this GPC faction.

== Electoral history ==
=== Presidential elections ===
Election	Party candidate	Votes	%	Result
1999	Ali Abdullah Saleh	3,584,399	96.2%	Elected ✓
2006	Ali Abdullah Saleh	4,149,673	77.2%	Elected ✓
2012	Abdrabbuh Mansur Hadi	6,621,921	100.0%	Elected ✓

=== House of Representatives elections ===
Election	Party leader	Votes	%	Seats	+/–	Position	Result
1993	Ali Abdullah Saleh	640,523	28.7%	123 / 301	▲123	▲1st	Minority government
1997	Ali Abdullah Saleh	1,175,343	43.1%	187 / 301	▲64	1st	Majority government
2003	Ali Abdullah Saleh	3,429,888	58.0%	226 / 301	▲39	1st	Supermajority government

== See also ==
- List of political parties in Yemen
