= Timeline of the Yemeni revolution (3 June – 22 September 2011) =

Yemeni revolution
- Part of the Arab Spring
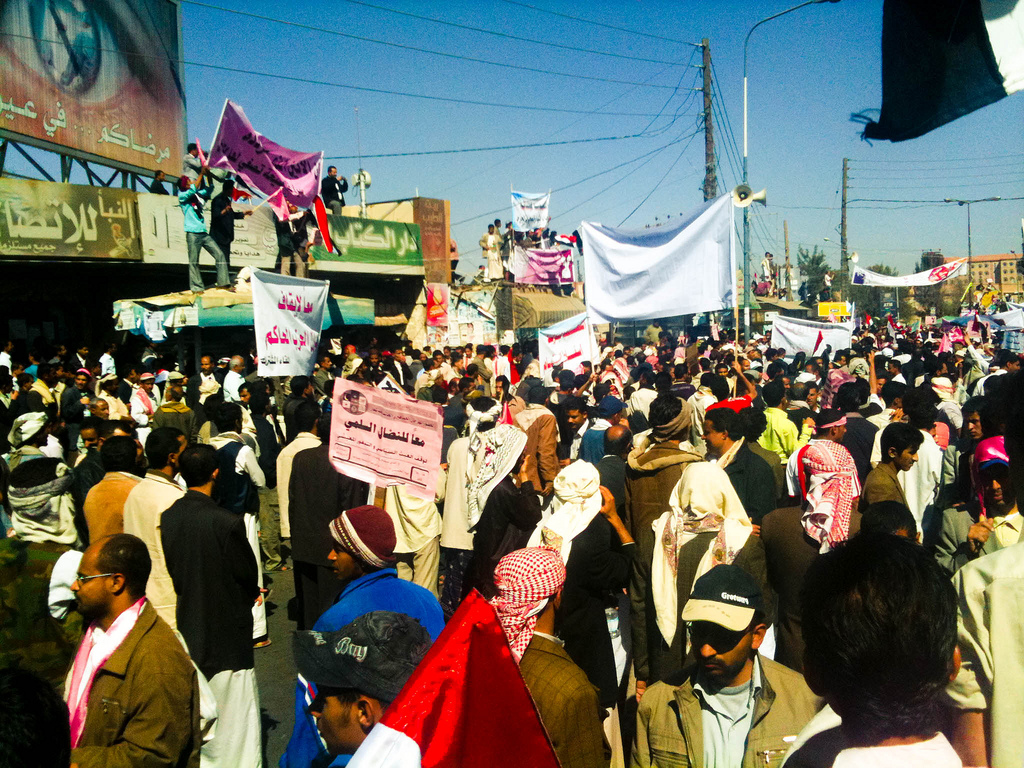
- Protest in Sanaa on 3 February 2011
- Date: 27 January 2011 – 27 February 2012
- Location: Yemen
- Caused by: Unemployment; Economic conditions; Corruption; Government's proposals to modify the Constitution of Yemen; Inspiration from concurrent regional protests
- Methods: Demonstrations; Civil resistance; Self-immolations; Strike actions; Mutiny; Non-violent revolutions; Army defections; Armed confrontations between Hashid militiamen and loyalist soldiers.
- Result: Overthrow of Saleh government: Resignation of Prime Minister Mujawar; Resignation of MPs from the ruling party; Occupation of several Yemeni territory by al-Qaeda and Houthi rebels; Restructure of the military forces by sacking several of its leaders; Approval of President's immunity from prosecution by Yemeni legislators; Presidential election held to replace Saleh as the new president of Yemen; Abd Rabbuh Mansur Al-Hadi elected and inaugurated

Parties
(Yemen) Yemeni opposition: Joint Meeting Parties; South Yemen Movement; Houthis; Students; Hashid; Alliance of Yemeni Tribes; Defected soldiers; Civil Bloc; National Dialogue Committee	(Yemen) Yemeni government: General People's Congress; Yemen Army; Yemeni Police Force; Republican Guards; Yemeni Air Force; Pro-Government Tribes

Casualties
- Deaths: 2,000 (by 18 March 2012)
- Injuries: 22,000
- Arrested: 1,000

The following is a timeline of the 2011–2012 Yemeni revolution from 3 June through 22 September 2011. The Yemeni revolution was a series of major protests, political tensions, and armed clashes taking place in Yemen, which began in January 2011 and were influenced by concurrent protests in the region. Hundreds of protesters, members of armed groups, army soldiers and security personnel were killed, and many more injured, in the largest protests to take place in the South Arabian country for decades.

The uprising entered a dramatic new phase with an apparent assassination attempt against President Ali Abdullah Saleh and other top Yemeni officials opposed by the protest movement. Saleh spent more than three and a half months undergoing treatment in Saudi Arabia for severe burns and shrapnel injuries, but survived the bombing that claimed the lives of several others in his inner circle. During this period of the uprising, Yemen was nominally led by Vice President Abd Rabbuh Mansur Hadi while Saleh was convalescent in Riyadh, the Saudi Arabian capital.

== Timeline ==
=== June ===
==== 3 June ====
Shelling reportedly hit the presidential palace and the area surrounding it. A blast in a mosque used by high-ranking Yemeni officials to pray left President Ali Abdullah Saleh, Prime Minister Ali Muhammad Mujawar, Speaker Yahya Ali al-Raee, and several other government officials wounded and killing several Yemeni soldiers and guards, as well as an imam. The fate of Saleh was not immediately clear, with opposition media briefly circulating a rumor that he had died. Initial reports stated that the mosque was destroyed when a rocket struck it, but later reports implicated a planted bomb in the attack that left Yemen's leadership in a state of confusion.

==== 4 June ====
Saleh left Yemen for Saudi Arabia, apparently for medical treatment. He handed over control to Vice President Abd Rabbuh Mansur Hadi, who was constitutionally empowered to serve as acting president until Saleh returned.

==== 5 June ====
Yemeni officials acknowledged that Saleh suffered second-degree burns on his face, neck, and chest, as well as serious shrapnel wounds. One official commented to media that he was "lucky to be alive". Thirty-one of Saleh's family members reportedly flew from Yemen to Riyadh, the Saudi capital, to be close to the convalescent president.

==== 6 June ====
Conflicting reports as to the status of Taiz were aired in media. According to some witnesses, Yemeni security forces withdrew from the country's second-largest city, leaving it in the hands of armed tribesmen and protesters. The Yemeni government denied Taiz was out of its control.

==== 7 June ====
At least one media outlet reported two protesters were shot dead and two more were injured by elements of the Republican Guard in Taiz, suggesting the reports of security forces withdrawing earlier in the week were at least partially mistaken. In Sanaa, the government rejected an offer by the Joint Meeting Parties to hold a dialogue with the opposition, calling it "ridiculous" and saying no talks could proceed without the express authorization and involvement of Saleh. In response, thousands of protesters massed outside of the acting president's residence to pressure him into forming a transitional council and agreeing to a plan for a transfer of power and democratization.

==== 8 June ====
Yemeni security officials speaking on the condition of anonymity admitted that parts of Taiz were under the control of anti-government tribesmen. Fighting apparently quieted in the city. Despite previous statements that it would not hold a dialogue with anti-government factions, Yemen's ruling party opened reportedly unprecedented talks with the Joint Meeting Parties, the country's main opposition coalition. Meanwhile, Saleh's personal aides said he is recovering with some minor difficulties, but other reports said that burns cover 40 percent of his entire body and he may take months to recover. Some doctors unaffiliated with the Saudi physicians administering to Saleh in Riyadh suggested that the president's injuries were likely to prove mortal, considering his age and the extent of the physical damage to his body—an informal prognosis quickly seized upon by some of Saleh's domestic critics and opponents. Many protesters said they were surprised and angered when troops under the command of defected Major General Ali Mohsen al-Ahmar, a relative and ally of Sheikh Sadiq al-Ahmar, used live ammunition and batons to disperse anti-government demonstrators in Sanaa holding a planned 24-hour sit-in. The sit-in was broken up with only five hours to go. No deaths, but some injuries, were reported. Hundreds of protesters marched later in the afternoon to condemn the attack and affirm their demands for a transitional government.

==== 9 June ====
Supporters of Saleh celebrated in Sanaa after the government affirmed that the president would return to Yemen and resume his duties. Officials reportedly claimed his injuries were "minor". Meanwhile, the United Kingdom called for the resumption of GCC mediation efforts while Saleh was sidelined. The New York Times reported that the Obama administration had stepped up covert military actions in the country targeting Al Qaeda in the Arabian Peninsula, filling a vacuum created by the preoccupation of much of Yemen's armed forces. In South Africa, parliamentary questions arose over South African–produced armoured vehicles reportedly turning up in the possession of Yemeni rebels who defected from the military.

==== 10 June ====
Supporters and opponents of the regime planned rival demonstrations in Sanaa for after noon prayers. About 100,000 anti-government protesters flooded Change Square, chanting slogans calling for a transitional government and for Saleh to be put on trial. Sadiq al-Ahmar led a large protest through the square, parading the bodies of Hashid fighters killed in clashes with Saleh loyalists the previous week. Protesters also reportedly gathered in Taiz and elsewhere in Yemen, with tens of thousands marching in Yemen's second-largest city to demand the formation of a transitional council.

==== 11 June ====
A source claiming knowledge of the situation at the hospital in Riyadh where Saleh and other injured Yemeni officials are undergoing treatment said the president's health was in such poor condition that he was unable to meet with a number of ministers who sought a bedside audience with him over the past week. According to this anonymous source, Saleh was continuing to experience difficulty breathing, and Prime Minister Ali Muhammad Mujawar, who purportedly also remains in serious condition, may have experienced serious and irreversible damage to his vision.

==== 13 June ====
Al Jazeera reported that sources within the opposition movement said opposition leaders had met with Acting President Hadi to discuss a transition of power. They voiced concerns that Saleh and his sons wield too much power in the country and said they discussed ways the government and the opposition could work together to expand the truce in Sanaa to the rest of Yemen, as well as ensure humanitarian aid could flow throughout the country to those who need it. Meanwhile, the Ministry of Defence again said Saleh would return and deliver a public address, and some government officials reportedly cast aspersions on a deal for a transfer of power while Saleh remained out of the country.

==== 17 June ====
A top Saudi official told AFP that Saleh would not return to Yemen. However, Abdu al-Janadi, Yemen's deputy information minister asserted that Saleh would return to Yemen "within coming days," adding that "The president's health is improving continuously."

==== 24 June ====
Yemeni police open fire on tens of thousands of protesters in the country's south, killing at least one. Six people were also injured in Aden when protesters clashed with security forces armed with tanks, according to a medical official.

==== 26 June ====
Ahmed al-Sufi, President Saleh's media secretary, announces that President Saleh will make a media appearance within the next 48 hours.

==== 29 June ====
President Saleh made a statement through his foreign minister, saying that a dialogue should begin with the opposition and that he was willing to consider a Gulf-brokered transition of power.

==== 30 June ====
More details emerge regarding Saleh's condition. Vice-President Abd-Rabbu Mansour Hadi told reporters that he had seen the President immediately after the attack with a piece of wood between his ribs and burns to his chest, arms, and face. Hadi added that he was uncertain whether Saleh will ever return to Yemen.

=== July ===
Territory and areas of influence for rebels (blue) and Islamists (red) in Yemen's uprising as of 7 July 2011.

==== 3 July ====
Police attempted to disperse a crowd of several hundred Eritrean refugees protesting outside the United Nations High Commissioner for Refugees' office in Sanaa by firing tear gas into the air. The refugees were demonstrating over concerns that they were endangered by the instability in the Yemeni capital.

==== 4 July ====
One protester was injured by security officers breaking up a second demonstration by Eritrean refugees outside the Sanaa UNHCR office.

==== 5 July ====
About 700 Eritreans again picketing the UNHCR office in Sanaa were dispersed by aggrieved security forces, leaving one child dead and five adults either injured or dead as well. A Yemeni colonel who spoke to media justified the attack by saying the protest disrupted the activities of the UNHCR office staff and "made chaos".

==== 6 July ====
Yemen state news organisation Saba announced that forty al-Qaeda militants have been killed in airstrikes in Abyan during the past two days. It also announces that two soldiers were killed during a counter-attack against militants who stormed an army camp.

==== 7 July ====
A speech recorded by Saleh in Saudi Arabia was televised on national television in Yemen. Saleh appeared to have suffered severe injuries, with his skin noticeably darker, his arms heavily bandaged, and his movement seeming greatly limited. The speech lasted just a few minutes, but in it, Saleh again championed the concept of power-sharing in a unity government while claiming that protesters and the opposition movement had an "incorrect understanding of democracy". Reaction to the speech on the streets of Sanaa and other Yemeni cities was mixed, with supporters lighting off fireworks and firing guns in the air to celebrate and protesters expressing disappointment with the speech. One to four people were reported to have died in the ensuing trajectory of the gunfire.

==== 8 July ====
Rival demonstrations were organised in Sanaa following Saleh's speech. An article written by staff of TIME magazine in Aden was published in the U.S.-based newsweekly suggesting that South Yemen could secede from the Republic of Yemen within days or weeks. The article quoted the secretary-general of the Sons' League Party as saying that South Yemen, which confederated with North Yemen in 1990, could secede and the government would not attempt to stop it.

==== 9 July ====
Human Rights Watch said that Yemeni soldiers were fighting Al Qaeda in the Arabian Peninsula militants in Abyan after losing control of the provincial capital Zinjibar. The same day a Yemeni army officer and two of his subordinates were killed, and two civilians were wounded, in an ambush in Daleh near Aden. During the night Republican Guard shelling in Taiz caused the deaths of at least two civilians and 10 other injuries. Amid protests in the city calling for Saleh's ouster, women were also holding candlelight vigils.

==== 10 July ====
Al Arabiya reported that Saleh planned to return to Yemen on 17 July, accompanied by a Saudi medical team, to celebrate 33 years in power. Despite previous reports that Saudi authorities would not permit Saleh to leave the country, the story made no mention of opposition from Riyadh.

==== 13 July ====
Reuters claimed over 23 were killed and dozens more were injured over the previous week in clashes between Houthi separatists and supporters of the moderate Islamist opposition party Al-Islah in Jawf Governorate.

==== 16 July ====
Factions of the Yemeni opposition formed a 17-member transitional council, which included high-profile members like former South Yemeni President Ali Nasir Muhammad and General Abdullah Ali Aleiwa as well as some members who are currently living abroad in exile from Yemen. However, the Joint Meeting Parties rejected the council. "This council does not reflect [the views] of the Joint Meeting, because we have a different plan. It only represents those who set it up," said a JMP-aligned opposition party official.

In embattled Abyan, local tribes agreed to form a temporary alliance with the government to fight Islamist militants in Zinjibar and other towns controlled or contested by Al Qaeda in the Arabian Peninsula and other violent Islamist groups. Armed tribesmen joined with government troops en masse for the first time since the uprising began in the province, reportedly surrounding the militants late at night in what a government official claimed were the largest clashes in Zinjibar since Islamists took control of the town weeks earlier.

==== 17 July ====
Several hundred thousand anti-Saleh protesters marked the 33rd anniversary of Saleh's presidency by waving black flags and marching in Taiz, Sanaa, Amran, and other cities across Yemen. Several thousand counter-demonstrators in Sanaa turned out to hold up posters and pictures of the president.

In Abyan, where government troops and armed tribesmen joined forces the previous night to combat Islamist militants, fighting continued. A CNN reporter quoted one tribal fighter as saying, "We will not stop until the terrorists leave the province. We will fight and have nothing to lose." The tribes reportedly eased their blockade on the province in order to allow the Yemeni government to deploy reinforcements to the area.

==== 18 July ====
Violence erupted in the streets of Sanaa as government forces clashed with protesters and army defectors. The opposition claimed six were confirmed dead. In front of the home of Acting President Abd al-Rab Mansur al-Hadi, about 100 journalists picketed to protest government restrictions on freedom of the press and abuse of reporters.

==== 19 July ====
The Ethiopia-based Red Sea Afar Democratic Organisation, an Eritrean opposition group, said 38 Eritrean Navy personnel have defected with their ships and weapons to Al Hudaydah and elsewhere in Yemen since the start of July. A RSADO spokesman warned the defected sailors were at risk of deportation by Yemeni authorities and may be susceptible to ongoing violence in the country "as political uncertainty and volatile situations of Yemen's future continues". It urged the UNHCR in Yemen to take immediate action to protect the Eritrean defectors.

==== 28 July ====
At least 40 were killed in fighting between anti-government tribes and Yemen Army forces in Arhab District, a mountainous area north of Sanaa.

==== 30 July ====
Tribes in opposition to the government of President Ali Abdullah Saleh declared an Alliance of Yemeni Tribes at the headquarters of General Ali Mohsen al-Ahmar's defected 1st Armoured Division in Sanaa. The Alliance, headed by a 116-member "consultative council", vowed to defend protesters and announced a de facto mutual defence agreement with the protest movement, warning, "Any aggression or threat against the [protest] venues ... will be considered an attack against the tribes." Sadiq al-Ahmar, the head of the powerful Hashid tribal federation, was inaugurated as the Alliance's leader. After officially assuming the role, he reportedly told the gathering, "Ali Abdullah Saleh will not rule us as long as I am alive."

=== August ===
==== 1 August ====
Demonstrators at the Change Square protest camp in Sanaa celebrated the beginning of Ramadan at dawn, with many venturing out of their tents despite heavy rains in order to pray in the square. Near Taiz, anti-government tribesmen reportedly clashed with pro-Saleh forces, leaving two tribal fighters dead and three injured. Allied tribes withdrew from an army offensive to fight Islamist militants in South Yemen, evidently in response to a recent friendly fire incident in which 15 tribal fighters were killed.

==== 3 August ====
Tribes in the south rejoined the campaign against militants in Abyan Governorate.

==== 5 August ====
Armed Hashid tribesmen clashed with Republican Guards under the command of Ahmed Saleh, the president's son, in central Sanaa. Fighting lasted about half an hour. The city was divided during the day by fighters on both sides blocking streets and erecting makeshift checkpoints, Al Jazeera English reported. Sanaa International Airport was reportedly closed due to a threat by tribesmen to attack arriving and departing planes.

==== 6 August ====
Some clashes were reported in Sanaa, but fighting was minor compared to the street battles of the day before. In the evening, President Saleh was released from the Riyadh hospital where he had been convalescent for the previous two months. However, he remained in the Saudi Arabian capital, and it was unclear when and if he might return to Yemen.

==== 7 August ====
The Joint Meeting Parties issued a statement again denying any connection to the assassination attempt against Saleh in early June. The statement called for an investigation into the bombing, as well as acts of violence perpetrated against protesters throughout the year, and called the regime's treatment of the attack "a political blackmail to fail the seven-month youth protests". The Alliance of Yemeni Tribes warned the Yemeni Army against military operations in the Al-Hasaba district of downtown Sanaa, saying in a statement that tribesmen are obligated to defend the area, which has been central to protests in the capital city.

==== 8 August ====
Jordanian news website Al Bawaba reported, citing unnamed sources, that Saleh had decided not to return to Yemen for fear of facing trial. The report also claimed pressure applied by the United States on Saleh not to return was a factor in the president's decision.

==== 9 August ====
Yemeni officials denied the previous day's reports that Saleh would not return to Yemen, saying he would come back "after a specified period of convalescence". In Seiyun, thousands rallied to protest delays and shortages in the provision of basic necessities in favor of the importation of the narcotic khat. Security forces attacked the gathering, leaving one dead.

==== 10 August ====
Under the terms of a new truce in Taiz, armed anti-government tribesmen and government-loyal Republican Guard units mutually agreed to withdraw from the city streets and allow the deployment of regular police. After Saleh reportedly met with top GPC officials in Riyadh, a spokesman for the Yemeni government said he was considering restarting the GCC initiative.

==== 11 August ====
Despite the new truce, clashes erupted after tens of thousands of Yemenis in Taiz demonstrated to call for Saleh and his officials to step down and face trial. Four were injured.

==== 12 August – "Friday of Achieving Victory" ====
Unknown attackers left one soldier dead and two others wounded in an attack on a patrol in Taiz, according to state-run news. Hundreds of thousands of Yemenis rallied in western Sanaa to chant, "Revolt, revolt to all people against the tyrants," and exhortations to Allah to "grant us victory in Ramadan". Similar protests occurred in Aden, Al Hudaydah, Ibb, Ma'rib, Saada, and Taiz. Tens of thousands of Saleh's supporters also rallied in southern Sanaa with the slogan, "The people want Ali Abdullah Saleh." A senior government official said Saleh was considering a new plan under which he would transfer power to Hadi and allow new elections to be held while retaining his titular role as president, though the opposition had not accepted the terms.

==== 13 August ====
According to a newspaper report, Saleh claimed he would not sign the GCC deal unless General Ali Mohsen al-Ahmar and Sheikh Sadiq al-Ahmar, the most prominent leaders of armed opposition factions affiliated with the protest movement, left Yemen first. An opposition spokesman quoted in the report said that both had agreed to do so. The Joint Meeting Parties and Houthi rebels in Yemen's north reached a truce mediated by local tribes, the JMP website claimed. The JMP also appointed a new governor for Al Jawf Governorate, which is out of the government's control, in preparation for a planned national council to be announced 17 August. It named Al-Shareef Al-Hussein Al-Dhameen to the position. Hadi warned the JMP against forming the council, telling a British diplomat, "The serious consequences will affect all Yemenis if the opposition drags the country into anarchy."

==== 14 August ====
In northwestern Sanaa, the Republican Guard clashed with Ali Mohsen al-Ahmar's First Armoured Division, leaving one civilian dead in the crossfire. Hamid al-Ahmar, a leader of Islah, called on Western governments to freeze Saleh's overseas assets. He also voiced support for the GCC initiative.

==== 15 August ====
A car bomb struck a Houthi meeting at a government building taken over by the opposition in Al Jawf Governorate, killing at least one and leaving at least three injured. Asharq Al-Awsat reported that GPC parliamentary leader Sultan al-Barakani claimed "there is no longer room for doubt" that Hamid al-Ahmar was behind the June assassination attempt against Saleh and other government officials.

==== 16 August ====
Twenty-three Bakil tribal fighters were killed in Arhab in overnight fighting with the Republican Guard, according to an anti-government tribal source, Al Jazeera reported. The army claimed the fighting was sparked when it got word that the Bakil were planning to seize Sanaa International Airport and a nearby army base, while the Bakil denied the claim and said the army was trying to start a war with the tribal confederation. Government officials pinned responsibility on the political opposition, particularly former Al-Islah leader Mansur al-Hanaq, saying the alleged plot was evidence of "their plan to overthrow the constitutional legitimacy and seize power by force". Meanwhile, Saleh gave another televised address from Saudi Arabia to call for early presidential elections, denounce the opposition as "leftovers of Marxists, the Taliban and the imamate", and reiterate his plans to return to Sanaa "soon". One protester was killed and 16 others were wounded in Hodiedah by security forces and pro-Saleh assailants, an opposition activist reported.

==== 17 August ====
At Sanaa University, under the protection of the 1st Armoured Division, 800 representatives from the JMP, Al-Islah, Houthis, the Southern Movement, and other Yemeni opposition groups, together with representatives of the youth protesters, elected 143 members to constitute a new National Council for the Forces of the Peaceful Revolution. The council is charged with electing a 20-member executive committee to act as the political leadership and directing authority for the protest movement. Reportedly, among the 143 elected to the council were Tawakul Karman, Hamid al-Ahmar, Sadiq al-Ahmar, Ali Mohsen al-Ahmar, Mohammed al-Sabry, Mohammed Basindwa, and Yassin Saeed Noman. The headquarters of SabaFon GSM, a mobile phone network company chaired by Hamid al-Ahmar, was damaged by rocket-propelled grenades fired by unknown attackers at the building.

==== 22 August ====
Yemeni state-run media reported that Abdul Aziz Abdul Ghani, a former North Yemeni vice president, former Yemeni prime minister, and incumbent president of the Consultative Council, succumbed to injuries suffered in 3 June bombing of the presidential compound at his Riyadh hospital.

==== 23 August ====
Prime Minister Ali Muhammad Mujawar returned to Sanaa from Riyadh after being injured in the June assassination attempt against President Saleh, Yemeni state-run media reported.

==== 26 August – "Friday of Promising Victory" ====
The Yemeni National Council called for "Saudi Arabia and other Gulf countries to align with the aspirations of the Yemeni people, and not to provide support for the remnants of the regime". Thousands protested in cities across Yemen to call for Saleh to resign, while thousands of counter-demonstrators showed support for Saleh by carrying his portrait and shouting slogans calling for his return.

==== 29 August ====
Saleh again appeared to voice support for the Gulf Co-operation Council initiative and said presidential elections would be held within months. Reuters reported that a source close to Saleh said he had made a deal with the opposition to transfer power to Hadi in preparation for elections in three months' time.

==== 30 August ====
To mark the first day of Eid ul-Fitr, thousands rallied against Saleh in Sanaa, once more demanding for Ali Abdullah Saleh to resign.

=== September ===
==== 5 September ====
Negotiations gathered pace on a UN-brokered transition deal along the lines of the earlier deal crafted by the GCC.

==== 9 September – "Friday of Victory from God" ====
Yemeni protesters took to the streets and occupied change square in one of their biggest protest yet, with a million protesting against Saleh, including 500,000 in Taiz.

==== 10 September ====
Yemen's army re-takes the city of Zinjibar on the southern coast from alleged Islamic extremists with possible links to al-Qaeda.

==== 12 September ====
From Riyadh, Saleh issued a decree transferring some presidential powers to Hadi, including authorising the vice president to negotiate a power transfer deal based on the GCC framework and prepare for a new round of internationally supervised presidential elections.

==== 15 September ====
Yemeni security forces wound at least 12 protesters with live ammunition.

==== 16 September ====
Hundreds of thousands of Yemenis marched in Sanaa and Taiz to demand Saleh's resignation. The marchers were protected by the First Armoured Division led by General Ali Mohsen al-Ahmar. Security forces fired on protesters in Taiz, killing one and injuring 13, and in the Al-Raheda district of Sanaa, wounding one. It was unclear whether the First Armoured Division or the Alliance of Yemeni Tribes responded to the shootings.

==== 17 September ====
One defected soldier was killed in fighting between Ali Mohsen al-Ahmar's rebel troops, acting in support of a "youths' security committee", and government-loyal forces in Sanaa. The confrontation reportedly broke out when troops loyal to Saleh began attacking protesters holding a sit-in at Change Square, and the youths and defected soldiers, who have assumed the role of protecting the protest movement, responded with machine-gun fire.

==== 18 September ====
Hours after a Saudi official claimed that Hadi would sign the GCC transitional deal "within a week", government forces and plainclothes militiamen opened fire on protesters in Sanaa, in Change Square and other locations, in what appeared to be the deadliest one-day crackdown in months. Sadiq al-Ahmar, the head of the Alliance of Yemeni Tribes, told media that he had ordered tribal militias not to respond even under shelling by the Republican Guard, saying he did not want to give the government "any excuse not to sign a deal to transfer power", Al Jazeera reported. However, Interior Minister Motahar Rashad al-Masri accused the Hashid of provoking the incident, saying armed tribesmen attacked police and ministry staffers as they ate lunch. At least 26 protesters were killed and over 200 more were wounded. Ali Mohsen al-Ahmar's First Armoured Division reportedly responded, leaving a number of loyalist troops injured, though this was not immediately confirmed.

==== 19 September ====
At least 28 people are killed in Sanaa, a day after dozens were shot dead by forces loyal to the Saleh regime.

==== 20 September ====
Witnesses said the army fired rockets at a protest camp, killing several men. Shelling and gun battles again broke out in the capital despite rumours of a ceasefire, leaving at least 11 dead and several more wounded.

==== 22 September ====
Fighting continued despite a ceasefire declared by Hadi two days earlier.

== See also ==
- Outline of the Yemeni crisis, revolution, and civil war (2011–present)
- Timeline of the Yemeni crisis (2011–present)
