= Timeline of the Yemeni revolution (23 September – December 2011) =

Yemeni revolution
- Part of the Arab Spring
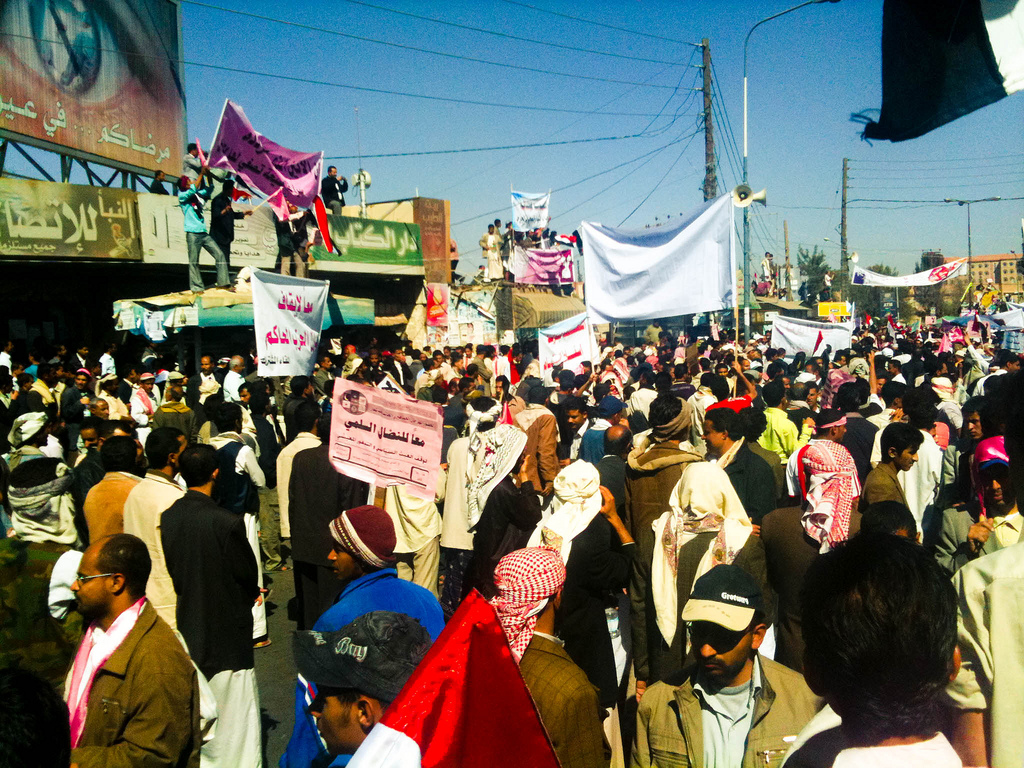
- Protest in Sanaa on 3 February 2011.
- Date: 27 January 2011 – 27 February 2012
- Location: Yemen
- Caused by: Unemployment; Economic conditions; Corruption; Government's proposals to modify the Constitution of Yemen; Inspiration from concurrent regional protests
- Methods: Demonstrations; Civil resistance; Self-immolations; Strike actions; Mutiny; Non-violent revolutions; Army defections; Armed confrontations between Hashid militiamen and loyalist soldiers.
- Result: Overthrow of Saleh government: Resignation of Prime Minister Mujawar; Resignation of MPs from the ruling party; Occupation of several Yemeni territory by al-Qaeda and Houthi rebels; Restructure of the military forces by sacking several of its leaders; Approval of President's immunity from prosecution by Yemeni legislators; Presidential election held to replace Saleh as the new president of Yemen; Abd Rabbuh Mansur Al-Hadi elected and inaugurated

Parties
(Yemen) Yemeni opposition: Joint Meeting Parties; South Yemen Movement; Houthis; Students; Hashid; Alliance of Yemeni Tribes; Defected soldiers; Civil Bloc; National Dialogue Committee	(Yemen) Yemeni government: General People's Congress; Yemen Army; Yemeni Police Force; Republican Guards; Yemeni Air Force; Pro-Government Tribes

Casualties
- Deaths: 2,000 (by 18 March 2012)
- Injuries: 22,000
- Arrested: 1,000

The following is a timeline of the 2011–2012 Yemeni revolution from 23 September through December 2011. The Yemeni revolution was a series of major protests, political tensions, and armed clashes taking place in Yemen, which began in January 2011 and were influenced by concurrent protests in the region. Hundreds of protesters, members of armed groups, army soldiers and security personnel were killed, and many more injured, in the largest protests to take place in the South Arabian country for decades.

With President Ali Abdullah Saleh's sudden return to Yemen, clashes between government loyalists and defected security forces became increasingly frequent, while the Gulf Co-operation Council attempted to revive a peace agreement thought dead since May. During this phase in the uprising, violence continued between pro- and anti-Saleh factions, especially in the capital Sanaa and second city Taiz. Meanwhile, Saleh signed a GCC peace initiative endorsed by the United Nations Security Council on 23 November, agreeing to relinquish power by 23 December in favor of a transitional government headed by Abd al-Rab Mansour al-Hadi, the vice president, while remaining president until new elections in February 2012.

== Timeline ==
=== 23 September – "Friday of the Million Man March" ===
Saleh reportedly returned to Yemen by plane, despite earlier reports that Saudi Arabia would prevent him from leaving the country.

Almost a million came out in Sanaa for an anti-government rally, the largest such protest in Sanaa in the entire uprising.

=== 24 September ===
Less than a day after Saleh's return to Yemen, pro-government forces reportedly attacked the protest camp in Change Square. At least one person was killed, a civilian torn apart by a mortar shell. Saleh also gave his first public address since his return, reaffirming his support for the GCC plan to transfer power without giving any specific timeline.

=== October ===
Territory and areas of influence for rebels (blue) and Islamists (red) in Yemen's uprising, as of 23 October 2011.

==== 4 October ====
Security forces shelled residential areas in Taiz, killing seven and leaving 122 injured. Two civilians were killed by shelling in Sanaa, in the crossfire between loyalist and dissident troops, and six more were injured in the fighting. Tens of thousands of protesters turned out to criticise Saleh and the United Nations for failing to negotiate an end to the crisis. The Yemeni opposition declared that due to the violence used against protesters, "The dialogue with the regime has stopped."

==== 7 October – Friday of al-Hamdi ====
Massive anti-government protests spread across Yemen on Friday as demonstrators called for the departure of the country's embattled president and his allies. Activists dubbed the day "the Friday of al-Hamdi," a reference to Ibrahim al-Hamdi, a popular former president of North Yemen who was slain in 1977. North and South Yemen merged into the Republic of Yemen in 1990. The estimated number of protesters across the country totaled three million, with 800,000 alone in the capital of Sanaa, according to a count of numbers from eyewitnesses. That count could not be verified independently. People in the south as well as the north hailed al-Hamdi and called for President Ali Abdullah Saleh to leave government.

==== 14 October – Friday of Victory for Yemen and Syria ====
Demonstrators on Friday called for the United Nations to intervene to put Yemeni President Ali Abdullah Saleh on trial in the wake of a crackdown on anti-regime protests that has cost hundreds of lives. "We want the world to pass a resolution which defends the blood of the revolutionaries," protesters chanted at a huge gathering near "Change Square" in central Sanaa that has become the epicenter of a campaign to oust Saleh. The demonstrators, who protest organizers said numbered in the hundreds of thousands, called for the veteran leader to go on trial. "There will be no immunity... Saleh and his cronies must face trial," chanted the protesters, gathered after weekly Muslim prayers as on every Friday since the outbreak of their campaign in late January.

==== 15 October ====
Yemeni security forces opened fire on thousands of protesters in Sanaa as they marched toward the city centre from Change Square, killing at least 64 people and wounding several dozen. The same day, The Siege of Dammaj began.

==== 21 October ====
The United Nations Security Council voted unanimously, 15–0, for a resolution condemning the violence and calling on Saleh to transfer power immediately under the GCC plan, which would secure amnesty for him and his family. The amnesty provision was opposed by many Yemeni protesters, including Nobel Peace Prize laureate Tawakul Karman.

==== 22 October ====
At least 10 people were killed in fighting between Yemeni government forces and opposition fighters in the capital Sanaa on Saturday, residents and witnesses said. The Yemeni government said it was ready to "deal positively" with a resolution approved by the U.N. Security Council on Friday that urged President Ali Abdullah Saleh to sign a deal requiring him to step down in exchange for immunity.

==== 25 October ====
Three civilian were reportedly killed, two by the use of live fire on a protest march and one by shelling, in Sanaa. The government reported three security personnel dead in Taiz, while the opposition claimed eight civilians in the second city were killed and 30 more wounded. Saleh's government and General Ali Mohsen al-Ahmar signed a deal for a ceasefire after several days of fighting, but clashes continued and media reported the truce had failed. The Interior Ministry reported a fourth police officer died in Taiz by the end of the day. Meanwhile, Saleh claimed in talks with the United States' ambassador to Yemen that he was committed to the GCC deal and ready to relinquish power.

In southern Yemen, an Antonov military cargo plane carrying 15 members of the Syrian and Yemeni armed services crashed near al-Anad Airbase in Lahij Governorate, killing three Syrians and one Yemeni on impact, AFP reported.

==== 26 October ====
Egyptian daily Akhbar El Yom reported that the previous day's crash was a deliberate act by the aircraft's Yemeni pilot to prevent Syrian Air Force personnel aboard from being delivered on loan from their home country in order to bomb protesters on behalf of the Yemeni government. According to the article, the pilot's co-workers confirmed the plan was premeditated and the Syrians on board were not technicians as previously claimed, but MiG pilots.

Elsewhere in Yemen, overnight fighting in Sanaa and Taiz left 25 dead, including at least nine soldiers and at least seven tribal fighters in the capital alone. Several hundred Yemeni women organised a veil-burning in protest later in the day, blocking a main street in Sanaa and handing out leaflets asking for protection as the coverings burned.

==== 30 October ====
The General People's Congress announced that it would nominate Vice President Abd al-Rab Mansur al-Hadi to stand in proposed presidential elections once the GCC deal is signed.

=== November ===
==== 2 November ====
Foreign Minister Abu Bakr al-Qerbi said the government and opposition were working toward a deal for implementing the GCC agreement, which a European Union envoy credited to United Nations Security Council Resolution 2014.

The New York Times ran a feature story on Taiz alleging that regime insiders feared a battle could go the way of Libya's, where Benghazi became a secure headquarters for rebels to wage a successful civil war against Muammar Gaddafi and his supporters earlier in the year. Governor Hamoud al-Sofi, the highest-ranking official in Taiz Governorate, was quoted as describing the situation as "a war, from all senses of the meaning". Seven civilians were killed as the Yemen Army shelled residential neighbourhoods in retaliation for local fighters' takeover of a government building. Five soldiers were reported dead as well, apparently killed by armed anti-government tribesmen.

==== 4 November ====
Protesters held massive Friday demonstrations against Saleh in Taiz, as well as in 16 other governorates, with violence erupting once again in the city.

==== 9 November ====
Houthi rebels defeated pro-government Kashir and Aahm tribes and seized control of the Kuhlan Ash Sharaf District, advancing towards the port of Midi and the capital of Sanaa.

==== 11 November – Friday of No Amnesty for the Murderers ====
At least 17 civilians have been killed and 32 injured from artillery shelling by Yemeni forces in the Yemeni city of Taiz, a day after a UN envoy began a new mission to push President Ali Abdullah Saleh to resign under a Gulf-backed peace plan. Tens of thousands launched protests against Saleh in Saleh, demanding Saleh to be put on trial for crimes against humanity.

==== 13 November ====
Yemeni army and tribal fighters killed 9 suspected Al-Qaeda militants in fighting in Zinjibar.

==== 15 November ====
President Ali Abdullah Saleh says he will resign within 90 days based on an agreement with Gulf Cooperation Council.

==== 19 November – Friday of the Female Martyrs of the Revolution ====
Hundreds of thousands of people in Sanaa and throughout the country protested against Saleh, calling for Saleh to be tried for crimes against humanity. The protesters vowed punishment against Saleh's government for the killing of protesters, especially for the killing of women and children.

==== 20 November ====
At least 400 soldiers defected from Yemeni Army, some were apparently members of the Republican Guard.

==== 22 November ====
The United Nations envoy to Yemen said at a press conference in Sanaa, "All the parties have agreed to implement the Gulf Co-operation Council initiative."

==== 23 November ====
Saleh arrived in Saudi Arabia to attend the GCC deal's signing, Yemeni state television reported. Saleh signed the agreement and gave a brief speech in which he referred to the uprising as a "coup" and described the assassination attempt that left him incapacitated for much of the summer as "a scandal". Ban Ki-moon, the secretary-general of the United Nations, said he had received word from Saleh that after the signing ceremony, the outgoing president planned to fly to New York City for medical treatment.

==== 25 November ====
To mark the Islamic New Year, Saleh sent a message to the Yemeni military and police justifying his signature of the GCC agreement, Yemeni state news reported. According to the report, Saleh said he wanted to avoid "destruction, bloodshed and the slide into chaos".

==== 26 November ====
Despite Ban's assurances Saleh would fly to the United States, the president instead returned to Yemen. Opposition leader Yassin Saeed Noman said that while he did not object to Saleh returning to the country, he did not believe Saleh's continued activity and prominence after signing an agreement that legally reduced him to a symbolic figurehead was appropriate.

==== 28 November ====
At least 25 people are killed in fighting between Sunni and Shia groups.

=== December ===
==== 3 December ====
7 people were killed in clashes in Taiz.

==== 4 December ====
A ceasefire agreement was reached in Taiz, but fighting continued despite the truce.

==== 6 December ====
A spokeswoman for UNICEF said 3 children were killed and 7 wounded in the latest outbreak of violence in Taiz. The UN said more than 20 people had been killed and at least 80 had been injured in Yemen so far during the month as a result of fighting.

==== 7 December ====
Mohammed Basindawa, Hadi's prime minister-designate, announced names for a national unity government to be composed of Saleh loyalists and opposition members in equal measure. Hadi issued a decree to establish the government in the afternoon. Meanwhile, sporadic fighting between troops loyal to Saleh and army defectors and militants opposed to his rule continued in Taiz and Sanaa. At least one opposition tribal fighter was killed and 12 injured

==== 11 December ====
Hundreds of thousands in Sanaa protest calling for the trial of Ali Abdullah Saleh.

==== 12 December ====
At least 15 Al Qaeda convicts escaped from a prison in Aden using a tunnel to go under the wall.

==== 13 December ====
Al Qaeda fighters fired on a Yemeni military vehicle killing 3 soldiers and wounding 11 others near the southern city of Zinjibar. Yemeni police arrested 6 Al Qaeda members while allegedly planning attacks on senior government officials.

==== 16 December ====
Hundreds of thousands of Yemenis demonstrated Friday across the country rejecting an amnesty given to President Ali Abdullah Saleh against prosecution in a deal that eases him out of office. "A trial is a must and amnesty is rejected," chanted demonstrators in Sanaa's Sitin Street, close to Change Square—the focal point of protests that broke out in January demanding Saleh's departure after 33 years in power. Similar demonstrations were staged in 18 cities and towns across Yemen in response to a call by the central organising committee of protests, as protesters insisted Saleh and his top lieutenants should face justice over the killing of demonstrators.

==== 20 December ====
Fighting between suspected Al-Qaeda militants and Yemeni troops in Yemen's restive Abyan province have killed 2 soldiers and 13 Islamists, military officials said on Tuesday.

==== 21 December ====
A Yemeni military official says a battle against al-Qaeda-linked fighters in the south has killed 10 of the militants and 5 Yemeni soldiers. The fighting took place overnight outside the city of Zinjibar, which remains under the partial control of Islamic militants who seized the city in May.

==== 24 December ====
A protest organiser said that Saleh loyalists, including elite troops, attacked a group of more than 100,000 demonstrators calling for the leader's trial as they entered Sanaa on their march north from Taiz, killing at least nine. United States Ambassador Gerald M. Feierstein defended the Yemeni government's reaction to the demonstration, saying the protest march was intended "to generate chaos and provoke a violent response by the security forces" and claiming the U.S. government would have acted similarly if thousands of people marched on the White House in Washington, D.C.

==== 25 December ====
As Vice President Abd al-Rab Mansur al-Hadi met with Ambassador Feierstein at his office, tens of thousands of Yemenis marched past chanting slogans demanding justice for protesters killed on the march from Taiz to Sanaa and denouncing Hadi as Saleh's puppet. On Facebook, Tawakul Karman, the 2011 Nobel Peace Prize laureate and leader of the opposition Al-Islah party, condemned Feierstein's statement the previous day and demanded the ambassador apologise. Several Houthi youth leaders demanded that Feierstein leave Yemen altogether over his remarks.

==== 26 December ====
The New York Times reported that the Obama administration in the U.S. had decided to admit Saleh to the country for medical treatment by the end of the week, to stay at least through elections in February 2012. Unnamed officials quoted in the Times' report said the administration had decided it was best to keep Saleh out of Yemen during the planned political transition, even if it came at the cost of the United States' image among Yemenis who might view the move as granting political asylum to the embattled president.

==== 31 December ====
The General People's Congress announced that Saleh had decided to remain in Yemen through the elections instead of leaving the country as previously planned. At least one party figure blamed the opposition for changing the situation, accusing anti-government activists of sowing disruption and provoking violence. Other officials, speaking anonymously, said the Republican Guard, under the leadership of Saleh's son Ahmed Ali Saleh, and Central Security, under the leadership of the Saleh's nephew Yahya Mohamed Abdullah Saleh, had launched a new crackdown against dissenters in their own ranks. Hundreds of thousands took to the streets to call for the president's trial and execution over his government's violent response to the protests, marching in Sanaa and other major Yemeni cities.

== See also ==
- Outline of the Yemeni crisis, revolution, and civil war (2011–present)
- Timeline of the Yemeni crisis (2011–present)
- Timeline of the Yemeni revolution
- Yemeni revolution
