= Timeline of the Yemeni revolution (January – 27 February 2012) =

Yemeni revolution
- Part of the Arab Spring
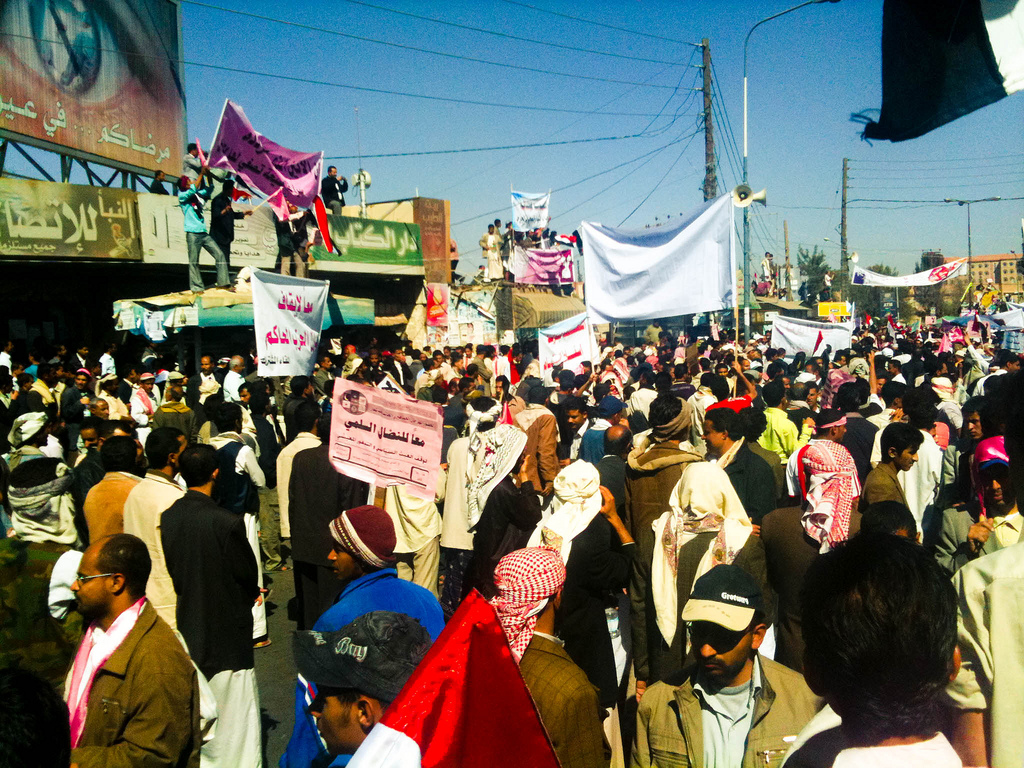
- Protest in Sanaa on 3 February 2011
- Date: 27 January 2011 – 27 February 2012
- Location: Yemen
- Caused by: Unemployment; Economic conditions; Corruption; Government's proposals to modify the Constitution of Yemen; Inspiration from concurrent regional protests
- Methods: Demonstrations; Civil resistance; Self-immolations; Strike actions; Mutiny; Non-violent revolutions; Army defections; Armed confrontations between Hashid militiamen and loyalist soldiers.
- Result: Overthrow of Saleh government: Resignation of Prime Minister Mujawar; Resignation of MPs from the ruling party; Occupation of several Yemeni territory by al-Qaeda and Houthi rebels; Restructure of the military forces by sacking several of its leaders; Approval of President's immunity from prosecution by Yemeni legislators; Presidential election held to replace Saleh as the new president of Yemen; Abd Rabbuh Mansur Al-Hadi elected and inaugurated

Parties
(Yemen) Yemeni opposition: Joint Meeting Parties; South Yemen Movement; Houthis; Students; Hashid; Alliance of Yemeni Tribes; Defected soldiers; Civil Bloc; National Dialogue Committee	(Yemen) Yemeni government: General People's Congress; Yemen Army; Yemeni Police Force; Republican Guards; Yemeni Air Force; Pro-Government Tribes

Casualties
- Deaths: 2,000 (by 18 March 2012)
- Injuries: 22,000
- Arrested: 1,000

The following is a timeline of the 2011–2012 Yemeni revolution from January to 27 February 2012. The Yemeni revolution was a series of major protests, political tensions, and armed clashes taking place in Yemen, which began in January 2011 and were influenced by concurrent protests in the region. Hundreds of protesters, members of armed groups, army soldiers and security personnel were killed, and many more injured, in the largest protests to take place in the South Arabian country for decades.

In early 2012, it was clear President Ali Abdullah Saleh's time in power was drawing to a close. Saleh made several trips abroad during this period as unrest and anger against his regime continued at home, as did shows of support for him. In an uncontested election in which Saleh was not on the ballot, Vice President Abd Rabbuh Mansur Al-Hadi stood for and was elected to the presidency. His swearing in days later marked the official end of the Saleh administration, amid suggestions Saleh could seek exile in Oman or Ethiopia.

== Timeline ==
=== January 2012 ===
==== 1 January ====
Clashes between loyalists of President Ali Abdullah Saleh in the Yemen Army Republican Guard and opposition forces of the Alliance of Yemeni Tribes under Sadiq al-Ahmar left one bystander dead in the capital of Sanaa and two residents dead in the region of el-Fardha Nehem. The fighting was reportedly stopped when Vice President Abd Rabbuh Mansur al-Hadi, nominally acting with the powers of the presidency under a Gulf Co-operation Council agreement inked in November 2011, personally intervened to mediate between the government and opposition. The opposition rallied in the streets and accused Saleh of attempting to sabotage the GCC peace deal ahead of elections scheduled for February. Activists reiterated their demand that Saleh face trial instead of enjoying the immunity granted by the GCC initiative.

==== 8 January ====
The cabinet approved a law granting immunity to President Saleh. The action forwarded the law to the legislature for its approval.

==== 12 January ====
Shi'a rebels in the north clashed with Salafi Islamist militants, leaving at least four Salafis dead.

==== 13 January ====
South Yemen separatists traded fire with soldiers at a festival commemorating the beginning of the Yemeni Civil War some 26 years earlier. Four civilians were killed and two soldiers were injured, according to witnesses and officials. At least 10 were wounded by security forces.

==== 16 January ====
Rada' District in central-west Yemen was allegedly captured by militants linked to Al Qaeda in the Arabian Peninsula. Some 150 inmates were reportedly set free from a prison there. Several opposition figures accused the Yemeni government of deliberately allowing Rada' to fall in a bid to demonstrate that Yemen was too unstable for a political transition to occur.

==== 17 January ====
Foreign Minister Abu Bakr al-Qirbi said the presidential election scheduled for February could be delayed due to security concerns.

==== 21 January ====
The Assembly of Representatives of Yemen approved the immunity law. It also nominated Vice President Hadi as its candidate for the upcoming presidential election. Alistair Burt, the United Kingdom's Middle East minister, lauded Hadi's nomination, saying an interim Hadi presidency would provide a credible political transition for the country heading into free and fair elections in 2014.

==== 22 January ====
President Saleh departed abruptly for Oman en route to the United States for medical treatment, government officials said. In a statement, Saleh asked the Yemeni people to forgive him for "any shortcomings" and vowed to return. Thousands of Yemenis protested in Sanaa against the immunity law, chanting for Saleh's trial and execution over his role in the crackdown. Several hundred Yemeni soldiers and airmen took over Sanaa International Airport to demand the removal of Yemeni Air Force chief Mohammad Saleh al-Ahmar, President Saleh's half-brother, sparking a confrontation with loyalist security forces. Major General Ahmed Ali al-Ashwal, the military's chief of staff, was reportedly forced to intervene. At least one protester was arrested, the Yemen Post indicated.

==== 23 January ====
The Air Force strike continued in Sanaa, with protesters continuing to demand General Mohammad Saleh al-Ahmar's removal.

==== 24 January ====
Reuters reported that Saleh sought asylum in Oman and that the Omani government was reluctant to accommodate him for fear of damaging bilateral ties with Yemen in the future if popular pressure for the president to be tried for his role in the government crackdown continued. In Yemen, the strike entered its third day, with airmen blocking main roads in Sanaa and protesters thronging outside Hadi's residence.

==== 26 January ====
In overnight fighting in Saada Governorate, Salafi militants allegedly attacked Houthi rebels in control of the region, leaving at least 22 dead. Protesters continuing to demand General Mohammed Saleh al-Ahmar be sacked claimed two Air Force officers were abducted by pro-Saleh gunmen in Hudaiydah for supporting the strike.

==== 29 January ====
Saleh arrived in the United States for treatment. In a statement, the U.S. government claimed it granted him a visa only for medical reasons. The same day, Republican Guard units fired on protesting soldiers, including Republican Guardsmen calling for the replacement of superior officers, in Sanaa. No casualties were reported.

==== 31 January ====
Information Minister Ali al-Amrani escaped an apparent assassination attempt unhurt after unidentified gunmen riddled his car with bullets as he left a Cabinet meeting in Sanaa.

=== February 2012 ===
==== 10 February ====
Major protests took place across Yemen, with tens of thousands rallying to ask Vice President Abd Rabbuh Mansour al-Hadi to "save the country" as Yemenis prepared for a 21 February presidential election in which Hadi would be the only candidate on the ballot. The Associated Press noted that the demonstrations marked a change in tone for the Yemeni street, which previously appeared to largely oppose the Gulf Co-operation Council's peace plan. In Taiz, protesters marked the one-year anniversary of the uprising with the lighting of a "revolution torch" on Jamal Street, the cradle of the protests, and fireworks late into the night.

==== 11 February ====
Sheikh Sadiq al-Ahmar, head of the Hashid and the Alliance of Yemeni Tribes, said he would participate in the upcoming presidential election in order to "forget about Ali Abdullah Saleh", Yemen's outgoing president. He encouraged his followers to vote as well. Military defectors marched from Change Square to near Hadi's residence to call for reform. As a concession, the government provided buses to send the defectors to Sanaa's "Officers' Club" to collect their first paychecks in months, Al Jazeera reported. A carnival parade arranged by pro-election activists and an opera celebrating Yemeni unification continued festivities marking the uprising's one-year anniversary in Taiz. A smaller group of protesters set up a stage to denounce the impending single-candidate election of Hadi as president, calling for a boycott of the polls.

==== 13 February ====
South Yemen separatists reportedly set fire to a protest camp in Aden, the south's principal port city, to protest the upcoming 21 February election supported by many protesters wishing to see Saleh removed from power.

==== 14 February ====
A bomb went off at a polling site being set up in Aden, killing the apparent separatist purportedly trying to plant it inside a voting booth, according to a government official. The official said the Southern Movement was trying to disrupt the election.

==== 16 February ====
A labor strike crippled Yemen's petroleum output as workers and staff at the state oil company Petromasila shut down production at the Masila oilfield, the country's largest. Strikers complained of "corruption" at the Oil Ministry and voiced anger over the departure of the multinational corporation Canadian Nexen, which it said owed them money from its tenure as Petromasila's operator.

==== 17 February ====
Striking Petromasila workers agreed to return to work, according to a Dow Jones source.

==== 18 February ====
McClatchy Newspapers reported that many residents of Aden intended to heed the Southern Movement's call for an election boycott. At least one party leader decried the "occupation" of former South Yemen by troops loyal to Sanaa, despite Hadi being a southerner himself.

==== 21 February - Election Day ====
The presidential election was held, with hundreds of thousands of Yemenis going to the polls to vote for Hadi, the only candidate on the ballot. Some unofficial estimates put turnout at around 80 percent. The United States and other countries issued statements congratulating the Yemeni people and voicing support for the single-candidate election. Huge rallies reportedly erupted across the country as many Yemenis celebrated President Ali Abdullah Saleh's coming departure from power and the election of a new leader. However, in Yemen's south, nine people were reportedly killed when police clashed with anti-government protesters calling for a boycott, and voting was disrupted when gunmen stormed polling places, stealing and destroying a number of ballot boxes, according to local residents in Lahej Governorate. Meanwhile, exports from the Masila oilfield reportedly resumed after the one-day strike of the previous week.

==== 22 February ====
Saleh departed from Logan International Airport in Boston en route to Addis Ababa, the Ethiopian capital.

==== 24 February ====
Late in the evening, Saleh arrived in Sanaa from Addis Ababa, intending to attend the inauguration of President-elect Hadi.

==== 25 February ====
Hadi took the constitutional oath of office as Yemen's president. In a speech, he vowed to address the problems of internal displacement and rampant poverty in Yemen.

==== 27 February ====
President Hadi was formally inaugurated in a ceremony in Sanaa. Saleh, the former president, accompanied Hadi and handed him a folded flag of Yemen as a symbol of the passage of power. Saleh said he would remain as head of the General People's Congress, Yemen's ruling party, and a number of activists demonstrated outside Hadi's residence calling for a restructuring of the military to remove Saleh's loyalists and relatives from positions of power. The Joint Meeting Parties boycotted the ceremony, calling Hadi's election a "heresy". Meanwhile, the Associated Press reported that Saleh and his family were preparing to go into exile in Ethiopia.

== See also ==
- Outline of the Yemeni crisis, revolution, and civil war (2011–present)
- Timeline of the Yemeni crisis (2011–present)
