= Bani Ali =

Bani Ali may refer to:

- Bani Ali (Hazm al-'Udayn district, Ibb), a sub-district in Hazm al-'Udayn district, Ibb Governorate, Yemen
- Bani Ali (Mudhaykhirah district, Ibb), a sub-district in Mudhaykhirah district, Ibb Governorate, Yemen
- Bani Ali (Sanaa), a sub-district in Arhab district, Sanaa Governorate, Yemen
