= Timeline of the Yemeni revolution =

Events of 2011 and 2012

A timeline of the Yemeni revolution spans the following four articles related to the Yemeni revolution:

- Timeline of the Yemeni revolution (January – 2 June 2011), a chronology from the start of protests in mid-January 2011 to 2 June 2011, the eve of a pivotal bombing
- Timeline of the Yemeni revolution (3 June – 22 September 2011), a chronology from the bombing of the presidential compound on 3 June 2011 to 22 September 2011, the last day of vice-presidential rule
- Timeline of the Yemeni revolution (23 September – December 2011), a chronology from the president's return on 23 September 2011 to the end of December 2011
- Timeline of the Yemeni revolution (January – 27 February 2012), a chronology from the start of 2012 to the inauguration of a new president on 27 February 2012

== See also ==
- Timeline of the Arab Spring
- Outline of the Yemeni crisis, revolution, and civil war (2011-present)
- Timeline of the Yemeni crisis (2011–present)
