= Himyar Abdullah al-Ahmar =

Yemeni politician and the leader of Hashid tribe

Hiymar Abdullah Hussein al-Ahmar
- حمير عبدالله حسين الأحمر

Chief of Hashid Tribe Confederation
- Incumbent
- Assumed office 8 January 2023
- Preceded by: Sadiq al-Ahmar

Member of the House of Representatives
- Incumbent
- Assumed office 27 April 2003

Deputy Speaker of the House of Representatives
- In office 2008–2016

Personal details
- Relations: Abdullah ibn Husayn al-Ahmar (father) Sadeq Al-Ahmar (brother) Hamid al-Ahmar (brother)

Sheikh Himyar bin Abdullah bin Hussein al-Ahmar (Arabic: حمير عبد الله حسين الأحمر; 1970 –) is a Yemeni politician and the leader of Hashid tribal confederation. He is a GPC MP and served as deputy speaker of Yemeni Parliament. On 8 January 2023, Hashid's tribal leaders chose Hiymar to succeed his late brother Sheikh Sadiq al-Ahmar as chief of Hashid tribal confederation.
