= Al-Thulth (Sanaa) =

Al-Thulth الثلث
- Sub-district
- Location in Yemen
- Coordinates: 15°39′44″N 44°09′57″E
- Country: Yemen
- Governorate: Sana'a
- District: Arhab

Population (2004)
  - Total: 5,398
- Time zone: UTC+3

Al-Thulth (Arabic: الثلث) is a sub-district located in Arhab District, Sana'a Governorate, Yemen. Al-Thulth had a population of 5398 according to the 2004 census.
