= Sha'ab (Sanaa) =

Sha'ab شعب
- Sub-district
- Location in Yemen
- Country: Yemen
- Governorate: Sana'a
- District: Arhab

Population (2004)
  - Total: 8,983
- Time zone: UTC+3

Sha'ab (Arabic: شعب) is a sub-district located in Arhab District, Sana'a Governorate, Yemen. Sha'ab had a population of 8983 according to the 2004 census.
