= Al-Khamis (Sanaa) =

Al-Khamis الخميس
- Sub-district
- Location in Yemen
- Coordinates: 15°45′14″N 44°11′48″E
- Country: Yemen
- Governorate: Sana'a
- District: Arhab

Population (2004)
  - Total: 7,314
- Time zone: UTC+3

Al-Khamis (Arabic: الخميس) is a sub-district located in Arhab District, Sana'a Governorate, Yemen. Al-Khamis had a population of 7314 according to the 2004 census.
