= Al-Zubayrat =

Al-Zubayrat الزبيرات
- Sub-district
- Location in Yemen
- Coordinates: 15.74426°N 44.35227°E
- Country: Yemen
- Governorate: Sana'a
- District: Arhab

Population (2004)
  - Total: 2,110
- Time zone: UTC+3

Al-Zubayrat (Arabic: الزبيرات) is a sub-district located in Arhab District, Sana'a Governorate, Yemen. Al-Zubayrat had a population of 2110 according to the 2004 census.
