= Shakir (Sanaa) =

Shakir شاكر
- Sub-district
- Location in Yemen
- Country: Yemen
- Governorate: Sana'a
- District: Arhab

Population (2004)
  - Total: 8,568
- Time zone: UTC+3

Shakir (Arabic: شاكر) is a sub-district located in Arhab District, Sana'a Governorate, Yemen. Shakir had a population of 8,568 according to the 2004 census.
