= Bani Hakam =

Bani Hakam بني حكم
- Sub-district
- Location in Yemen
- Coordinates: 15.694167°N 44.327778°E
- Country: Yemen
- Governorate: Sana'a
- District: Arhab

Population (2004)
  - Total: 3,216
- Time zone: UTC+3

Bani Hakam (Arabic: بني حكم) is a sub-district located in Arhab District, Sana'a Governorate, Yemen. Bani Hakam had a population of 3,216 according to the 2004 census.
