= Al-Mansur (Sanaa) =

Al-Mansur المنصور
- Sub-district
- Location in Yemen
- Coordinates: 15°54′47″N 44°19′49″E
- Country: Yemen
- Governorate: Sana'a
- District: Arhab

Population (2004)
  - Total: 6,328
- Time zone: UTC+3

Al-Mansur (Arabic: المنصور) is a sub-district located in Arhab District, Sana'a Governorate, Yemen. Al-Mansur had a population of 6328 according to the 2004 census.
