= Qatwan =

Qatwan قطوان
- Village
- Location in Yemen
- Coordinates: 15.81669°N 44.18578°E
- Country: Yemen
- Governorate: Sanaa
- District: Arhab
- Elevation: 8,927 ft (2,721 m)
- Time zone: UTC+3 (Yemen Standard Time)

Qatwan (Arabic: قطوان Qaṭwān) is a village in Arhab District of Sanaa Governorate, Yemen.

== History ==
The earliest known historical mention of Qatwan is in the year 934 or 935 (322 or 323 AH). It is mentioned in several sources, including the Ghayat al-amani of Yahya ibn al-Husayn and the Sirat al-Hadi ila'l-Haqq of Ali ibn Muhammad al-Abbasi. Qatwan was the site of battles on two occasions, first in 938 (326 AH) and then again in 1572 (980 AH). The reference for the battle in 1572 describes Qatwan as being in the territory of Bilad al-Khashab.
