= Habar (Sanaa) =

Habar حبار
- Sub-district
- Location in Yemen
- Coordinates: 15°46′27″N 44°18′17″E
- Country: Yemen
- Governorate: Sana'a
- District: Arhab

Population (2004)
  - Total: 1,111
- Time zone: UTC+3

Habar (Arabic: حبار) is a sub-district located in Arhab District, Sana'a Governorate, Yemen. Habar had a population of 1111 according to the 2004 census.
