= Iyal Abdillah =

Iyal Abdillah عيال عبد الله
- Sub-district
- Location in Yemen
- Country: Yemen
- Governorate: Sana'a
- District: Arhab

Population (2004)
  - Total: 9,750
- Time zone: UTC+3

Iyal Abdillah (Arabic: عيال عبد الله) is a sub-district located in Arhab District, Sana'a Governorate, Yemen. Iyal Abdillah had a population of 9750 according to the 2004 census.
