= Hizam =

Hizam هزم
- Sub-district
- Location in Yemen
- Country: Yemen
- Governorate: Sana'a
- District: Arhab

Population (2004)
  - Total: 12,135
- Time zone: UTC+3

Hizam (Arabic: هزم) is a sub-district located in Arhab District, Sana'a Governorate, Yemen. Hizam had a population of 12135 according to the 2004 census.
