= Bani Murah =

Bani Murah بني مرة
- Sub-district
- Location in Yemen
- Coordinates: 15°48′01″N 44°17′19″E
- Country: Yemen
- Governorate: Sana'a
- District: Arhab

Population (2004)
  - Total: 4,753
- Time zone: UTC+3

Bani Murah (Arabic: بني مرة) is a sub-district located in Arhab District, Sana'a Governorate, Yemen. Bani Murah had a population of 4753 according to the 2004 census.
