= Battle of Sanaa (2011) =

Battle of the Yemeni Revolution

- Part of the Yemeni Revolution
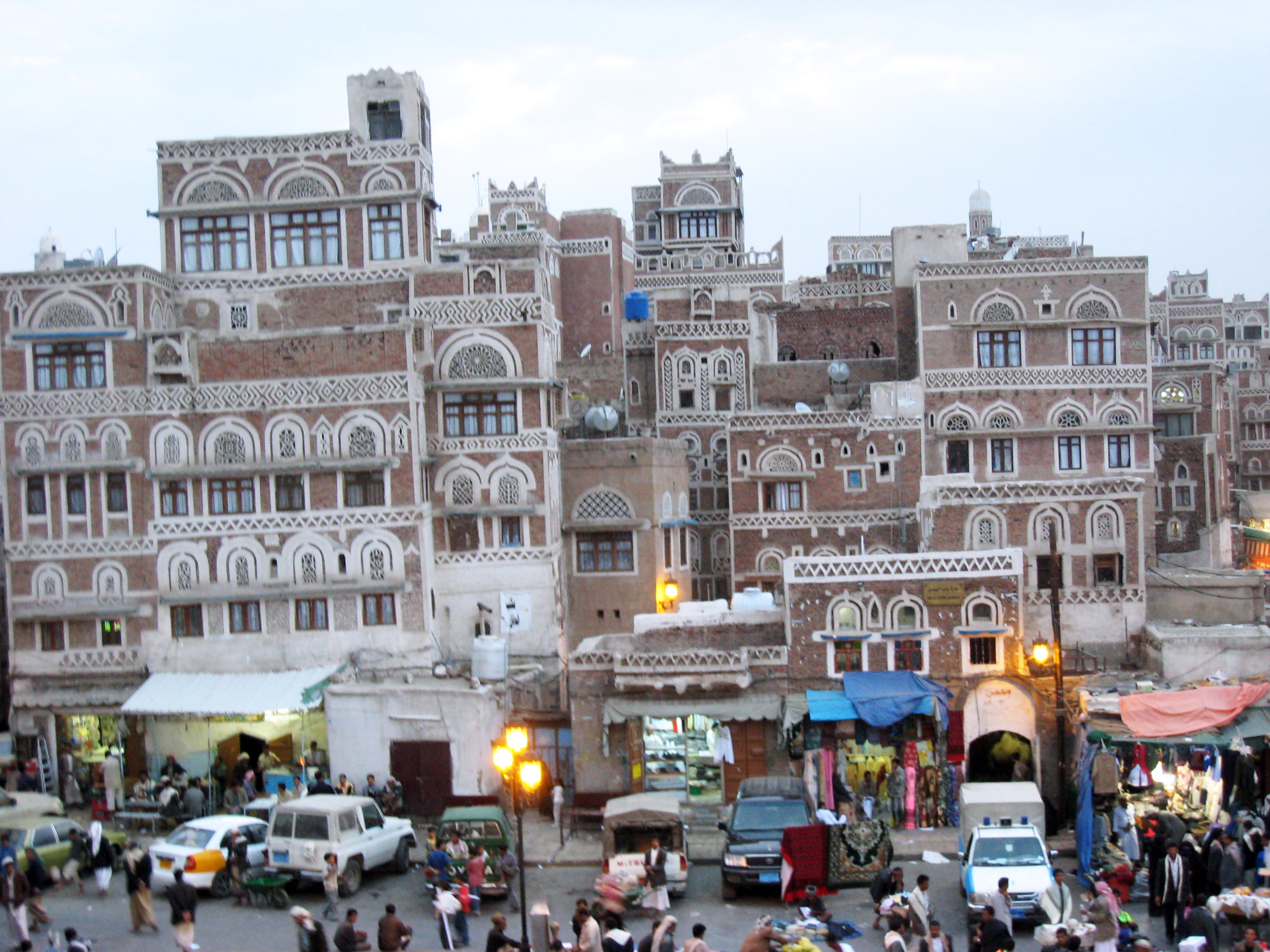
- Sana'a city center
Date	23 May–7 June 2011 (2 weeks and 1 day) (First phase); 18 September–25 November 2011 (2 months and 1 week) (Second phase)
Location	Sanaa, Yemen
Result	Indecisive

Belligerents
Yemeni government; Yemeni Armed Forces; Yemen Army; Republican Guards; Yemeni Air Force; Police Force; People's Committees	Joint Meeting Parties; Alliance of Yemeni Tribes; Army defectors; Al-Islah militia; Anti-government protesters

Commanders and leaders
(Yemen) Ali Abdullah Saleh (WIA) (Yemen) Gen. Abdrabbuh Mansur Hadi (Yemen) Gen. Ahmed Saleh (Yemen) Gen. Ahmed bin Saeed (Yemen) Gen. Ali Nasser Gatami † (Yemen) Gen. Abdullah al-Kulaibi † (Yemen) Abdul Aziz Abdul Ghani (DOW)	Sheikh Sadiq al-Ahmar; Gen. Ali Mohsen al-Ahmar; Gen. Mohammed Khalil; Gen. Ibrahim al-Jayfi

Strength
26th Brigade; 63rd Brigade; 101st Brigade; Special Forces Brigade; Presidential Guard	25,000–30,000 fighters 1st Armored Division; 9th Brigade; 200,000 protesters

Casualties and losses
97 soldiers killed 20 soldiers missing 30 soldiers captured 1 policeman killed	258 tribal fighters killed 98 defected soldiers killed
- 149+ civilians killed 16 unidentified killed

The Battle of Sanaa was a battle during the 2011 Yemeni uprising between forces loyal to Yemeni President Ali Abdullah Saleh and opposition tribal forces led by Sheikh Sadiq al-Ahmar for control of the Yemeni capital Sanaa and, on the part of the opposition, to oust President Saleh.

== Background ==
The 2011 Yemeni uprising followed the initial stages of the Tunisian Revolution and occurred simultaneously with the Egyptian Revolution and other mass protests in the Middle East in early 2011. In the early phase, protests in Yemen were initially against unemployment, economic conditions and corruption, and the poor economy of Yemen, as well as against the government's proposals to modify Yemen's constitution. The protestors' demands then escalated to calls for Yemeni President Ali Abdullah Saleh to resign. Mass defections from the military, as well as from Saleh's government, had effectively rendered much of the country outside of the government's control, and protesters vowed to defy its authority.

A major demonstration of over 16,000 protestors took place in Sana'a, Yemen's capital, on 27 January, including at least 10,000 at Sana'a University. On 2 February, Saleh announced he would not run for reelection in 2013 and that he would not pass power to his son. On 3 February, 20,000 people protested against the government in Sana'a, while others protested in Aden, a southern Yemeni seaport city, in a "Day of Rage" called for by Tawakel Karman, while soldiers, armed members of the General People's Congress and many protestors held a pro-government rally in Sana'a. In a "Friday of Anger" on 18 February, tens of thousands of Yemenis took part in anti-government demonstrations in Taiz, Sana'a and Aden. On a "Friday of No Return" on 11 March, protestors called for Saleh's ousting in Sana'a where three people were killed. More protests were held in other cities, including Mukalla, where one person was killed. On 18 March, protesters in Sana'a were fired upon resulting in over forty deaths and ultimately culminating in mass defections and resignations.

On 23 April, Saleh accepted a proposal to step down and shift control to his deputy after thirty days. The agreement included immunity for him and his family and required the opposition to stop public protests and join a coalition with Saleh's ruling party. Reactions to Saleh's acceptance had been reserved, without the agreement formalized or accepted by either side and with the possibility of the stand-off continuing. After initially refusing to accept Saleh's conditions, the opposition decided to agree to the deal, and it was expected to go into effect by 2 May. However, Saleh decided not to sign the deal, and the opposition rejected a proposal under which top officials of his party would sign it as a proxy, leaving the deal in limbo. On 22 May, after Saleh had agreed to the deal only to back away hours before the scheduled signing for the third time, the Gulf Cooperation Council declared it was suspending its efforts to mediate in Yemen.

== Battle ==
=== First phase ===
A day after Saleh refused to sign the transition agreement, Sheikh Sadiq al-Ahmar, the head of the Hashid tribal federation, one of the most powerful tribes in the country, declared support for the opposition and his armed supporters clashed with loyalist security forces in the capital Sana'a. Heavy street fighting ensued, which included artillery and mortar shelling. The militiamen had surrounded and blocked off several government buildings in the capital and people on the ground were reporting that the situation looked like deteriorating into a civil war.

During the second day of fighting, loyalist forces heavily shelled with mortars al-Ahmar's compound in which a number of his fighters were killed or wounded. This resulted in a counter-attack by the militiamen against the Interior Ministry building which they hit with mortars, RPGs and machine-gun fire. As evening fell on 24 May, the upper floors of the Interior Ministry headquarters were in flames.

On day three of the fighting, military units that defected to the opposition were hit for the first time by mortar fire, killing three soldiers and wounding 10. By the evening, it was reported that tribesmen took control of the Interior Ministry building, SABA state news agency, and the national airline building.

On 26 May, heavy explosions rocked Sana'a in the south. This indicated the use of heavier weaponry than what had been used in the previous days. 28 people were killed when shelling hit a residential area controlled by the tribesmen. The government claimed that the deaths were the result of a tribal weapons warehouse exploding, while a defector military official denied this and the opposition stated that military forces shelled a building used by tribal fighters loyal to al-Ahmar and other major tribes who had joined him. During the night, the fighting spread to the Arhad district, about 20 miles (32 km), northwest of Sana'a, where a brigade of Saleh's presidential guard clashed with local tribesmen.

On 27 May, tribesmen surrounded the camp of the Republican Guard in the al-Fardha Nehem area, 50 miles (80 km) northeast of Sana'a in an attempt to prevent them from joining the fighting in the capital. The tribesmen claimed that the advance on the base was in response to an earlier attack by loyalists on a village in the area. The militiamen broke into the camp and killed tens of troops, including the base commander, general Ali Nasser Gatami, and took over the base. After that, government military planes bombed the tribesmen. Two loyalist helicopters then attempted to bring in reinforcements, landing 1.24 miles (2.00 km) from the base. However, they were overrun and the tribesmen captured a number of soldiers as well as the two helicopters. A third helicopter, that was hovering above, was shot down by the militia. A military official stated that seven jets were used against the tribesmen and both him, and later a tribal leader, confirmed that a total of two military compounds had fallen to the opposition forces by the end of the day. 18 tribesmen were killed during the fighting for the first army camp, while none died in the takeover of the second.

A ceasefire was announced late on 27 May, by al-Ahmar, and the next day, a truce was established.

However, by 31 May, the ceasefire had broken down and street fighting continued in Sana'a. Tribesmen had taken control of both the headquarters of the ruling General People's Congress and the main offices of the water utility.

On 1 June, units of the loyalist Presidential Guard, commanded by one of Saleh's sons, shelled the headquarters of an army brigade belonging to the defected 1st Armored Division, even though the defected military units were holding a neutral position in the conflict between the loyalists and the tribesmen. The worst of the fighting was in the northern Hassaba neighborhood, where tribal fighters seized a number of government ministries and buildings. Government artillery fire heavily damaged the house of al-Ahmar and the government cut the area's electricity and water supplies. The government units, led by one of Saleh's sons, and loyalist special forces attacked but failed to recapture the Hassaba administrative building. Tribal fighters also seized the office of the General Prosecutor in the city's northwest. They were backed up by two armored vehicles from the 1st Armored Division. The Interior Ministry stated that the tribesmen had also captured a five-story building in the pro-Saleh Hadda neighborhood. During the 24 hours since the breakdown of the ceasefire, 47 people were killed on both sides during the heavy street fighting, including 15 tribesmen and 14 soldiers.

On 2 June, more fighting left another 15 people dead, including a seven-year-old girl. Thousands of tribesmen from outside Sana'a attempted to enter the city to reinforce those fighting inside. They were stopped at a military checkpoint 9.3 miles (15.0 km) north of the capital, but, as the day developed, they continued to make attempts to break through government lines into Sana'a. As the fighting was raging to the north of the city, tanks and armored vehicles were seen entering Sana'a from the south. Also, video of the street fighting in Sana'a surfaced for the first time.

On 3 June, an attack on the presidential palace left Saleh lightly injured and seven other top government officials wounded. It is unclear whether it was a rocket attack or a bomb has been planted in the mosque of the palace. Saleh, the prime minister, the deputy prime minister, the parliament chief, the governor of Sana'a and a presidential aide were wounded while they were praying at a mosque inside the palace compound. The cleric leading the service was also wounded. Saleh was injured in the neck and treated on the scene. Seven presidential guards were killed. Eyewitnesses, residents and government officials say Hashed tribesmen carried out the attack against the presidential palace, but the spokesman for Sadeq Al-Ahmar denied it. "The Hashed tribesmen were not behind these attacks on the presidential palace and if they were, they would not deny it," according to spokesman Abdulqawi al-Qaisi. He said that "the attack on the palace was pre-planned by President Saleh to make people forget about the attacks that he has committed over the last two weeks. He is the only one benefiting from the attack on the Presidential palace. He wants people to feel he is oppressed and is defending himself and not attacking others."

The next day, Saleh was taken to Saudi Arabia for treatment. According to U.S. government officials, Saleh suffered a collapsed lung and burns on about 40 percent of his body. A Saudi official said that Saleh has undergone two operations: one to remove the shrapnel and a neurosurgery on his neck.

As Saleh flew to the Saudi capital of Riyadh for surgery on 4 June, a cease-fire was brokered by Saudi Arabia's King Abdullah. Reportedly, Saleh was already working out the details of a power transfer when he was wounded, making his return doubtful. However, an opposition party official told The Associated Press that international mediators, including the U.S. and Saudi Arabia, tried to get Saleh to sign a presidential decree passing permanent authority to his vice president before he left for treatment in Saudi Arabia and the negotiations delayed his departure. He was expected to remain in Saudi Arabia for two weeks: one for treatment and another for meetings with Saudi officials. His absence also increased the possibility of an even more violent power struggle between the armed tribesmen who had joined the opposition and loyalist military forces under the command of Saleh's sons and nephews.

On 5 June, protesters in Sana'a celebrated following the news of the president's departure. They chanted: "This is it, the regime has fallen." Sources told Al Jazeera that vice-president Abd al-Rab Mansur al-Hadi had taken over as acting president and supreme commander of the armed forces. Despite the cease-fire there were reports on the morning of 5 June of heavy gunfire and explosions in Sana'a centred on Hasaba district, a focal point of fighting in recent weeks. On the same day al-Arabiya television said that acting president Abd-Rabbu Mansour al-Hadi was due to meet members of the military and Saleh's sons. It was the first indication that Saleh's powerful sons had not also left the country.

A cease-fire in Yemen's capital was at risk of unraveling on 6 June, as regime supporters opened fire on opposition fighters in renewed clashes that killed at least six. The shooting took place in the Hasaba district.

Residents of Sana'a said the capital was quiet on 7 June. The Youth for Change, who have said that Yemen was reborn when Saleh departed to Saudi Arabia, decided to stage a march of millions after they heard the regime's announcement that Saleh would return in the coming days.

=== Second phase ===
Following the return of Saleh from Saudi Arabia, clashes in the capital resumed and between 18 and 25 September 162 opposition and security forces members were killed with the military using artillery on opposition rallies. On 19 September, protesters, along with members of the renegade 1st Armored Division, attacked one of the smaller bases of the Republican Guards, located on the west side of the major al-Zubairy road. They took control of it, without firing a shot, and the loyalist forces retreated from the area. On 24 September, the loyalist military shelled the headquarters of the 1st Armored Division, leaving 11 soldiers dead and 112 wounded.

On the night of 25 September, opposition tribesmen attacked the base camp of the 63rd Brigade in the Nehm district, 43.5 miles (70.0 km) north of Sana'a. During the fighting, the commander of the brigade, General Abdullah al-Kulaibi, was killed. In all, seven soldiers were killed. The tribesmen also claimed to have captured 30 soldiers after briefly capturing parts of the base.

On 27 September, the defense minister escaped an assassination attempt when a suicide bomber attacked his convoy.

On the morning of 28 September, opposition forces shot down a government warplane just north of the city. Eyewitnesses stated that the aircraft was bombarding a residential compound in the Arhab district when it was brought down. Two people were killed in an air-strike in the district the previous night. Air-strikes had targeted the area since 25 September, when the base of the 63rd Brigade was raided.

On 15 October, a new round of fighting started which lasted until 17 October. It started with government troops firing on protesters and killing 12. Another six protesters were killed the next day. On 17 October, 17 people, including eight tribal fighters and two government soldiers, were killed. During this time, 10 defecting soldiers were also killed. By this point, 91 soldiers from the defected 1st Armored Division had been killed since Saleh's return to the country.

On 23 October, 12 people were killed in fighting between renegade and loyalist soldiers in the Hasaba district.

More fighting on 27 October, left another 17 people dead. Among the dead were civilians, tribal fighters and government soldiers.

On 30 October, during the evening, the Air Force base in the capital was hit by mortar shells and two fighter jets were set on fire. Due to this, the civilian airport was shut down and the coming flights were diverted to the southern Aden airport. At the same time, 10 explosive devices planted inside 10 fighter jets at the military base were found and defused.

On 19 November, opposition tribesmen once again attacked the camp of the 63rd Brigade, and this time it was an all-out assault. On 20 November, the military conducted air-strikes against the attackers while the opposition responded with anti-aircraft fire. By late on 21 November, the tribesman had captured the camp along with 300-400 surrendering soldiers and a large cache of weapons. 12 tribal fighters were killed and more than 40 wounded in the fighting, most of them due to landmines around the base. 20 soldiers were also killed.

Between 23 and 25 November, loyalist air-strikes and artillery fire pounded the rebel-held camp. An unnamed official claimed that up to 80 tribal fighters were killed.
