= Timeline of the Arab Spring =

== 2010 ==
=== December ===
17 December 2010: Mohamed Bouazizi sets himself on fire following harassment by a municipal officer, sparking protests across Tunisia.

29 December 2010: Protests erupt in Algeria following housing shortages.

== 2011 ==
=== January ===
14 January 2011: Thousands of Jordanians protest rising food prices, unemployment, and the government. The Tunisian government is dissolved and President Zine El Abidine Ben Ali flees the country after making concessions that fail to satisfy protestors.

17 January 2011: Protests begin in Oman, responding to corruption and high food prices.

25 January 2011: Thousands of protesters in Egypt gather in Tahrir Square, Cairo, demanding the resignation of President Hosni Mubarak.

27 January 2011: Thousands of protesters gather in Yemen demanding a change in government.

=== February ===
1 February 2011: King Abdullah II of Jordan dismisses Prime Minister Samir Rifai and his cabinet.

11 February 2011: Egyptian President Hosni Mubarak resigns and transfers his powers to the Supreme Council of the Armed Forces.

12 February 2011: Protests erupt in Iraq, responding to government corruption, a lack of electricity, and similar protests in Egypt.

14 February 2011: Protests in Bahrain start, initially for greater political freedom and respect for human rights; they were not intended to directly threaten the monarchy.

15 February 2011: Protests break out against Muammar Gaddafi's regime in Benghazi, Libya, leading to the First Libyan Civil War.

17 February 2011: Bahraini police raid a protest at the Pearl Roundabout in Manama; four protesters are killed.

19 February 2011: Stateless people (Bedoon) in Kuwait protest for citizenship and access to social services.

20 February 2011: Thousands of protestors gather in Morocco, demanding constitutional reform.

23 February 2011: Algerian President Abdelaziz Bouteflika promises to lift the 19-year-old state of emergency.

26 February 2011: Omani Sultan Qaboos bin Said al Said makes some economic concessions.

=== March ===
3 March 2011: Egyptian Prime Minister Ahmed Shafik resigns following protests.

13 March 2011: Sultan Qaboos promises to grant lawmaking powers to Oman's elected legislature.

14 March 2011: Gulf Cooperation Council forces (composed mainly of Saudi and UAE troops) occupy Bahrain on request of the government.

15 March 2011: Hundreds of Syrians gather to protest the al-Assad government, calling for democratic reforms and the release of political prisoners.

18 March 2011: The Bahraini government tears down the Pearl Roundabout monument.

=== April ===
15 April 2011: Algerian President Bouteflika announces major reforms.

26 April 2011: King Abdullah of Jordan creates the Royal Committee to Review the Constitution in accordance with calls for reform.

=== June ===
3 June 2011: Yemeni President Ali Abdullah Saleh is injured in a failed assassination attempt. He temporarily makes Vice President Abd Rabbuh Mansur Al-Hadi the acting president of the nation.

26 June 2011: Thousands of Kuwaitis rally in Al-Erada Square to protest against a court ruling that dissolved the opposition-dominated parliament.

=== July ===
1 July 2011: A constitutional referendum is held in Morocco.

=== August ===
20–28 August 2011: The Battle of Tripoli occurs in Libya. Rebel forces capture and effectively gain control of the capital city of Tripoli, therefore practically overthrowing the regime of dictator Muammar Gaddafi.

27 August 2011: Around 3,000 people, mainly men in traditional Kuwaiti dress, gather opposite parliament at Al-Erada Square to protest changes to the electoral law.

=== September ===
30 September 2011: Abdullah II approves changes to all 42 articles of the Constitution.

=== October ===
9–10 October 2011: Coptic Christians in Egypt protest against the destruction of a church. The Army responds by attacking the protesters with tanks, killing many.

20 October 2011: Muammar Gaddafi is captured and killed by rebels in the city of Sirte.

23 October 2011: The National Transitional Council (NTC) officially declares an end to the First Libyan Civil War.

24 October 2011: Abdullah II dismisses Prime Minister Marouf al-Bakhit and his cabinet.

=== November ===
16 November 2011: Kuwaitis storm their parliament and demand the resignation of Prime Minister Nasser Al-Sabah.

19 November 2011: Muammar Gaddafi's son, Saif al-Islam Gaddafi, was finally captured after hiding in Nigeria.

19–21 November 2011: Many people once again protest in Cairo's Tahrir Square, demanding that the SCAF speed up the transition to a more civilian government. Protesters and soldiers clash and many are injured and killed.

23 November 2011: The Bahrain Independent Commission of Inquiry released its report on its investigation of the events, finding that the government had systematically tortured prisoners and committed other human rights violations. It also rejected the government's claims that the protests were instigated by Iran.

28 November 2011: Kuwaiti Prime Minister Nasser Al-Sabah resigns.

=== December ===
20 December 2011: Many women protest in Egypt against human rights violations.

== 2012 ==
=== January ===
10 January 2012: Syrian President Bashar al-Assad gives a speech in which he blames the uprising on foreigners and says it will require the cooperation of all Syrians in order to stop the rebels.

24 January 2012: Egyptian Field Marshal and military leader Mohamed Hussein Tantawi announces the decades-old state of emergency will be partially lifted the following day.

=== February ===
3 February 2012: The Syrian government begins an attack on the city of Homs.

27 February 2012: Yemeni President Ali Abdullah Saleh officially resigns and then transfers his powers to Vice President Abd Rabbuh Mansur Al-Hadi.

=== April ===
20 April 2012: Many people once again protest in Cairo's Tahrir Square, demanding a quicker transfer of power to a new president.

=== May ===
2 May 2012: As the protests continue, Awn Al-Khasawneh resigns, and the King appoints Fayez Tarawneh as the new prime minister of Jordan.

23–24 May 2012: Egyptians vote in the first round of a presidential election. Ahmed Shafik and Mohammed Morsi win this election.

25 May 2012: The Syrian government carries out a massacre in Houla, killing 108 people.

=== June ===
2 June 2012: The former Egyptian president Hosni Mubarak is sentenced to life in prison by an Egyptian court.

13 June 2012: The former Tunisian president Zine El Abidine Ben Ali is sentenced to prison by a Tunisian court.

16–17 June 2012: Egyptians vote in the 2nd round of a presidential run-off election, which Mohammed Morsi wins.

20 June 2012: The Constitutional Court of Kuwait declares the February 2012 election illegal and reinstates the previous parliament.

24 June 2012: Egypt's election commission announces that Muslim Brotherhood candidate Mohammed Morsi won Egypt's presidential runoff. Morsi won by a narrow margin over Ahmed Shafiq, the last prime minister under deposed leader Hosni Mubarak. The commission says Morsi took 51.7 percent of the vote versus 48.3 for Shafiq.

=== July ===
12 July 2012: The Syrian army carries out a massacre in the Village of Tremseh. Up to 225 people are killed.

15 July 2012: The International Committee of the Red Cross officially declares that the Syrian uprising is now a civil war.

18 July 2012: A bombing in Damascus kills many members of President Bashar al-Assad's inner circle, including his brother-in-law Assef Shawkat.

19 July 2012: Former Egyptian Vice President Omar Suleiman dies of a heart attack at a hospital in Cleveland, Ohio, United States.

27 July 2012: Government forces and rebels begin fighting a battle to capture Syria's largest city, Aleppo. The UN reports that over 200,000 Syrian refugees have fled the country since the fighting began.

=== September ===
In late September, the Free Syrian Army moved its command headquarters from southern Turkey into rebel-controlled areas of northern Syria.

11 September 2012: Islamic militants attack the American diplomatic mission in Benghazi, Libya, killing U.S. Ambassador J. Christopher Stevens and Sean Smith, U.S. Foreign Service Information Management Officer.

=== October ===
9 October 2012: The Free Syrian Army seizes control of Maarat al-Numan, a strategic town in Idlib Governorate on the highway linking Damascus with Aleppo. By 18 October, the FSA had captured Douma, the biggest suburb of Damascus.

10 October 2012: Abdullah dissolves the parliament for new early elections and appoints Abdullah Ensour as the new prime minister.

19 October 2012: Wissam al-Hassan, a brigadier general of the Lebanese Internal Security Forces, dies along with several others in the 2012 Beirut bombing.

=== November ===
22 November 2012: Hundreds of thousands of protesters demonstrate against Egyptian president Mohammed Morsi after he grants himself unlimited powers to “protect” the nation and the power to legislate without judicial oversight or review of his acts.

== 2013 ==
=== January ===
25 January 2013: Protests against Mohamed Morsi develop all over Egypt on the second anniversary of the 2011 revolution, including in Tahrir Square, where thousands of protesters gathered. At least 6 civilians and 1 police officer are shot dead in the Egyptian city of Suez, while 456 others are injured nationwide.

=== February ===
In early February, Syrian rebels begin an offensive on Damascus.

12 February 2013: The United Nations states the death toll of the Syrian Civil War has exceeded 70,000 people.

=== March ===
6 March 2013: Syrian rebels capture Ar-Raqqah, the first major city to be under rebel control in the Syrian civil war. Meanwhile, the Syrian National Coalition is granted Syria's membership in the Arab League.

=== April ===
24 April 2013: The minaret of the Great Mosque of Aleppo, Syria, built in 1090, is destroyed during an exchange of heavy weapons fire between government forces and rebels.

=== June ===
June 5 2013: Syrian government forces retake the strategic town of Al-Qusayr.

=== July ===
3 July 2013: Mohamed Morsi is deposed in military coup d'état, followed by clashes between security forces and protestors.

8 July 2013: Egyptian Prime Minister Hisham Qandil resigns and the cabinet is dissolved, paving the way for military chief Abdel Fattah el-Sisi to run for president.

=== August ===
14 August 2013: Egyptian security forces, under the command of el-Sisi, attack protesters in Cairo, leaving hundreds dead and thousands wounded. Scholars argue the massacre ended the Arab Spring, at least in Egypt.

21 August 2013: In the Ghouta chemical attack, several areas disputed or controlled by the Syrian opposition are struck by rockets containing the chemical agent sarin. Estimates of the death toll range from 281 to 1,729.

=== December ===
30 December 2013: The Iraqi Civil War officially begins.

== 2014 ==
=== January ===
A conflict between the Syrian opposition and the Islamic State of Iraq and the Levant erupts.

=== May ===
7 May 2014: Syrian rebels withdraw from the Siege of Homs.

16 May 2014: The Second Libyan Civil War begins.

30 May 2014: Sisi wins the Egyptian presidential election, while his opponent says the vote was unfair.

=== September ===
8 September 2014: Haider al-Abadi is elected Prime Minister of Iraq.

== By country or region ==
- Egyptian Crisis (2011–2014)
- Timeline of the Bahraini uprising of 2011
- Timeline of the Syrian civil war
- Timeline of the Yemeni revolution
- Timeline of the 2011 Libyan civil war
- Timeline of the 2011–2012 Saudi Arabian protests

== See also ==
- Arab Spring
