= Bani Ali (Sanaa) =

Bani Ali بني على
- Sub-district
- Location in Yemen
- Coordinates: 15°57′18″N 44°12′57″E
- Country: Yemen
- Governorate: Sana'a
- District: Arhab

Population (2004)
  - Total: 7,415
- Time zone: UTC+3

Bani Ali (Arabic: بني على) is a sub-district located in Arhab District, Sana'a Governorate, Yemen. Bani Ali had a population of 7415 according to the 2004 census.
