= Bakil =

Yemeni tribal confederation

Bakil (Arabic: بكيل) is the largest tribal confederation in Yemen, consisting of more than 10 million people. Together with its sister tribe Hashid (approx. 4 million people), Bakil forms the grand confederation of Hamdān, historically referred to as the "two wings" (janāḥay) of Hamdān. The Hamdān confederation is the largest tribal confederation of Upper Yemen (al-Yaman al-Aʿlā), occupying strategically significant territory from around Yemen's capital Sanaa to the Saudi Arabian border in the northeast. A large part of the area around and north of Sanaa and east of the western mountain chain (Sarawāt) is called the land of Ḥāshid and Bakīl (bilād Ḥāshid wa-Bakīl). The member tribes of the Bakil confederation are found primarily north and northeast of the capital Sanaa, spanning the governorates of eastern Saʿdah, al-Jawf, and ʿAmrān. They do not form territorially contiguous blocks, but rather resemble a chessboard pattern, with the eastern part of Upper Yemen, especially the northeast, dominated by Bakīl.

Among the current leaders of Bakīl are the al-Shāyif family of Dahm, led by Naji bin Abdulaziz al-Shāyif of Dhū Ḥusayn segment of Dahm. Other influential shaykhly families of Bakīl are the shaykhly families of Abū Rās (Dahm), al-Juzaylān (Dahm), Ḥaydar (Sufyān), Ḥubaysh (Sufyān), al-Ghādir (Khawlān al-Ṭiyāl), and al-Ruwayshān (Khawlān al-Ṭiyāl).

== Tribal structure ==
The confederation of Bakīl subdivides into a number of member tribes. The constituent of Bakīl are Sufyān, Arḥab, Nihm, ʿIyāl Yazīd, ʿIyāl Surayḥ, al-Ahnūm, Murhibah, Banī Maṭar, Banī Ḥushaysh, Khawlān al-Ṭiyāl, Dahm, and Wāʾilah. Wāʾilah and Dahm are also referred to as Shākir tribes, as both are reckoned descendants of Shākir b. Bakīl. These member tribes further subdivide extensively. Their perceived common ancestry is commonly visualized as a tree-like structures in which tribes divide and subdivide into smaller branches, with all branches considered equal and none holding supremacy over others.

== Ancient history ==
Hashid and Bakil were the sons of Jashim bin Jubran bin Nawf bin Tuba'a bin Zayd bin Amru bin Hamdan. The Hamdan tribe was already well known in the 1st century AD and it was mentioned in Sabaean inscriptions. Therefore, Hashid and Bakil (the brothers) must have lived in the BC era. In the Middle Sabaean period (the 1st to 4th centuries CE) the Bakil confederation consisted of three sha`bs - Raydah, ʿAmrān, and Shibām.

In the 3rd century most of Hamdan migrated to Syria. Hashid and Bakil switched their alliance to Himyar.

== Conversion to Islam ==
In the year 622, prophet Muhammad sent Khalid ibn Al-Walid to Yemen to call them to Islam. However, Khalid managed to push the Najrani and Tihami Yemenis into Islam, but he didn't get a warm response from the Hamdani Yemenis of the highlands. So Muhammad sent over Ali ibn Abi Talib, and he was much more successful in converting the Hamdani Yemenis.

After the death of Muhammad, the Hamdan tribe remained Muslim and did not join the ridda movement.

== After Ali, power vacuum in Yemen and the Imam Hadi ==
The Hamdan tribe remained on the side of Ali, after the defeat of Ali and later his sons. The tribes remained on alliance to Ali but didn't oppose the Umayyads or ally themselves with the other Shias.

At that time Yemen was experiencing a great population movement forming the bulk of the Islamic Expansion mainly settling and Arabizing North Africa/Spain. However, the majority of the Hamdan tribe remained in Yemen which later helped the Hashid/Bakil Hamdani tribes become the biggest local key player, benefiting from the departure of the bulk of the most powerful Nomadic Yemeni tribes of that time into North Africa/Spain in Wetsward movements that continued until the 13th century.

By the 10th century the Imam al-Hadi Yahya bin al-Hussayn bin al-Qasim (a scion of Imam al-Hasan (as), grandson of the Prophet) who, at Sa'da, in 893-7 C.E. arrived to the Northern Highlands on invitation from the Hamdan tribe and from that time till present day the Zaidi moderate Shia teachings became dominant in north Yemen.

== Modern history ==
Imam Yahya's campaign to subject the country, and more specifically the tribes, to his control, led him to undertake massive campaigns against their influence and power; in fact, his efforts succeeded in permanently eliminating all but two of the ancient confederations (the Hashid is the other one to survive).

Many writers have referred to the Hashid and Bakil confederations as the "two wings" of the Zaidi imamate; in the sense that many of the tribes that belong to these confederations are and were strongly committed to Zaidi Islam, the imams were recognized - to a greater or lesser degree - as the heads of the Zaidi community and could, therefore, count on a measure of support and loyalty. Not all the tribes, however, accepted the temporal and even legal role that the imams arrogated to themselves; consequently, many imams (Imam Yahya and Imam Ahmad in the twentieth century included) complained bitterly about the tribes' inordinate political power.

== See also ==
- Alliance of Yemeni Tribes
- Sha'r Awtar

== Bibliography ==
- Andrey Korotayev. Ancient Yemen. Oxford: Oxford University Press, 1995. ISBN 0-19-922237-1
