= United Nations Security Council Resolution 2014 =

UN Security Council Resolution 2014
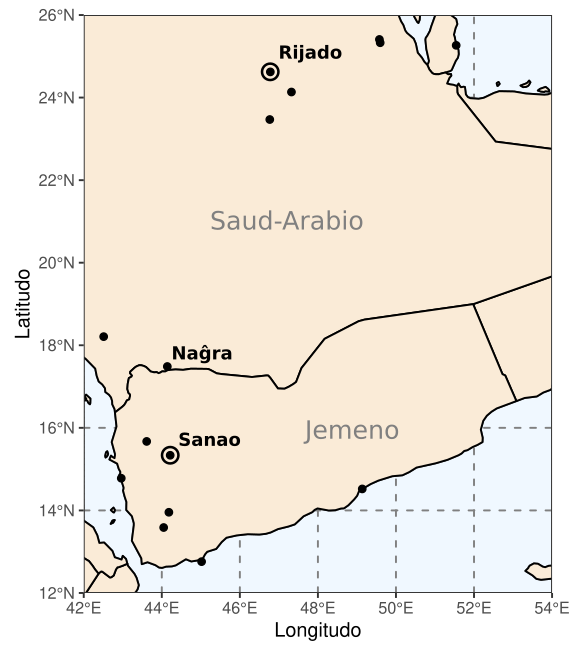
- Map of Yemen
- Date: 21 October 2011
- Meeting no.: 6,634
- Code: S/RES/2014 (Document)
- Subject: Situation in Yemen
- Voting summary: 15 voted for; None voted against; None abstained
- Result: Adopted

Security Council composition
- Permanent members: China; France; Russia; United Kingdom; United States
- Non-permanent members: Bosnia–Herzegovina; Brazil; Colombia; Germany; Gabon; India; Lebanon; Nigeria; Portugal; South Africa

United Nations Security Council Resolution 2014 was unanimously adopted on 21 October 2011.

== Resolution ==
The Security Council expressed "grave concern at the situation in Yemen" and the "worsening security situation." It also called for increased humanitarian support from the international community, while calling for an end to violence in Yemen amidst an Arab Spring-linked civil uprising and the potential growth of Al-Qaida in the Arabian Peninsula. The resolution also requested the Secretary-General to report back to them on the implementation of this resolution both within the "first 30 days...and every 60 days thereafter." The resolution also called for President Ali Abdullah Saleh to accept a peace plan brokered by the Gulf Cooperation Council for an orderly transfer of power and a "full and immediate ceasefire" between the warring factions of Saleh's supporters and the anti-government protesters. It also called for an independent investigation into the event that led to the violence.

== Reactions ==
United Nations human rights office condemned the violence in Yemen.

Saleh welcomed the resolution; at the same time Yemeni security forces killed one protester.

== See also ==
- List of United Nations Security Council resolutions concerning Yemen
- List of United Nations Security Council Resolutions 2001 to 2100
