= Bani Ali (Hazm al-'Udayn district, Ibb) =

Bani Ali بني على
- Sub-district
- Location in Yemen
- Coordinates: 14°08′33″N 44°02′53″E
- Country: Yemen
- Governorate: Ibb Governorate
- District: Hazm al-'Udayn District

Population (2004)
  - Total: 2,384
- Time zone: UTC+3

Bani Ali (Arabic: بني على) is a sub-district located in Hazm al-'Udayn District, Ibb Governorate, Yemen. Bani Ali had a population of 2384 according to the 2004 census.
