= Bani Ali (Mudhaykhirah district, Ibb) =

Bani Ali بني علي
- Sub-district
- Location in Yemen
- Coordinates: 13°48′29″N 43°55′14″E
- Country: Yemen
- Governorate: Ibb Governorate
- District: Mudhaykhirah District

Population (2004)
  - Total: 4,889
- Time zone: UTC+3

Bani Ali (Arabic: بني علي) is a sub-district located in Mudhaykhirah District, Ibb Governorate, Yemen. Bani Ali had a population of 4,889 according to the 2004 census.
