= Alliance of Yemeni Tribes =

Yemeni rebel group opposed to Saleh Government

- Leaders: Sadiq al-Ahmar of Hashid, Saba Aboluhom of Bakil
- Dates active: from 30 July 2011
- Groups: Hashid; Bakil
- Headquarters: Taiz, Yemen
- Active regions: Yemen; Ma'rib Governorate; Sana'a Governorate; Taiz Governorate
- Ideology: Revolutionary
- Size: 30,000-60,000 volunteers
- Wars: the 2011 Yemeni revolution

The Alliance of Yemeni Tribes (Arabic: تحالف قبائل اليمن, romanized: Taḥāluf Qabāʼil al-Yaman), sometimes referred to as the Yemeni Tribes' Alliance, was an alliance of tribes in Yemen opposed to the government of President Ali Abdullah Saleh. It was formed on 30 July 2011 amidst the civil uprising in Yemen to defend anti-government protesters. Its leader, Sheikh Sadiq al-Ahmar of the Hashid tribal federation, stated his intention to remove Saleh and his sons from power in his capacity as head of the Alliance.

The Alliance was headed up by a 116-member "consultative council".

== Composition ==
The exact strength of the Alliance is unknown, but at the ceremony in Sanaa that marked its inception, between 500 and 600 tribal leaders and chiefs attended. The Hashid, which were in revolt against the government, despite being the tribe of Saleh himself, were known to have been part of the coalition, as were the Bakil, Yemen's largest tribal confederation. The members of the Bakil clashed with government loyalists in Arhab District during the uprising. Reportedly, only some of the Bakil tribes were part of the Alliance originally, but days after its foundation, on 3 August, the Bakil's General Conference declared "full support" for anti-government tribal fighters in Arhab.

The tribes constituting the Alliance were characterised in news media as "pro-revolution".

== Proclamations ==
At the headquarters of General Ali Mohsen al-Ahmar, a prominent defector from the Yemen Army who lead the 1st Armoured Division, the Alliance of Yemeni Tribes was declared on 30 July 2011. Sadiq al-Ahmar was designated as its leader. After his appointment, Sadiq al-Ahmar said, "Ali Abdullah Saleh will not rule us as long as I am alive." Tribal leaders comprising the Alliance vowed "to protect and defend ... the popular and peaceful revolution". The coalition also declared a de facto collective security arrangement with the Yemeni protest movement, warning, "Any aggression or threat against the [protest] venues ... will be considered an attack against the tribes."

In a statement on 7 August 2011, the Alliance warned the government against conducting military operations in the Hasaba district of central Sana'a, an area seen as a bastion of the protest movement. The statement called on tribesmen to defend areas of the city claimed by the Yemeni opposition by any means necessary.

== Areas of operation ==
Though the exact composition of tribes party to the Alliance is unclear, anti-government tribal fighters were known to be active in the Sana'a Governorate, especially in Sana'a proper and the rugged Arhab District to its north; Ma'rib Governorate, east of Sana'a; and Taiz Governorate, particularly in the city of Taiz.

== See also ==
- Free Syrian Army
- National Liberation Army (Libya)
