= Hamid al-Ahmar =

Yemeni politician (born 1967)

- حميد الأحمر

General Secretary of the Preparatory Committee of the National Dialogue Conference
- In office 2011 – June 2013
- Preceded by: Position established
- Succeeded by: Ahmad Awad bin Mubarak (as General Secretary of the NDC)

Member of the House of Representatives
- Incumbent
- Assumed office 1993

Personal details
- Born: 27 December 1967 (age 58) Sana'a, North Yemen
- Party: Al-Islah
- Relations: Abdullah ibn Husayn al-Ahmar (father) Sadeq Al-Ahmar (brother)
- Education: Sanaa University

Hamid bin Abdullah bin Hussein al-Ahmar (Arabic: الشيخ حميد بن عبد الله بن حسين الأحمر; born 1967) is a Yemeni politician currently living in exile alongside the rest of the politicians that fled Yemen during the Houthi takeover of Sana'a September 2014. He is the former general secretary of the Preparatory Committee of the National Dialogue for the JMP and a member of opposition party Yemeni Congregation for Reform, commonly known as Islah.

He is a son of Abdullah ibn Husayn al-Ahmar, the former head of the Hashid tribal confederacy of Islah which is now headed by Hamid's older brother Sadeq who's living in the capital Sanaa, and the former Speaker of the Yemeni HR since 1993. Senior Al-ahmer has been known in Yemen as the presidents' maker and breaker. His uncle, after whom he is named, was executed by the Yemeni Imam Ahmed Hameed Al-deen (1948–1962) during the Yemeni civil war of 1962–1968. "After all, the heinous murder of his ambitious uncle and grandfather led his father to mobilize the Hashid tribes, normally supporters of the Imam, to the side of the revolution when it broke out in north Yemen in 1962. The efforts of his father, family, and tribesmen eventually led to the permanent demise of the Imamate’s 11 centuries' rule."

As a youth, he spent summers in either the United States or the United Kingdom, staying with a family to learn English. He earned a bachelor's degree in economics with honors at Sana'a University. He went into buying, eventually owning cellular telecom Sabafon, the Islamic Bank of Saba, and at least a dozen other businesses which most of them have now been seized by the Houthi militia and was a billionaire.

He has been a member of the Yemeni House of Representatives (HR) since the 1993 parliamentary elections. He has been a member of the Shoura Council of the Yemeni Congregation for Reform party which is known by its short Arabic name Islah, meaning "reform." At the beginning of 2007, he was elevated to the Higher Commission of the party, which is equivalent to a political bureau.

While not occupying any formal position within the Yemeni opposition parties coalition which is known as the Joint Meeting Parties—JMP. He is credited for leading the Yemeni opposition in a presidential elections battle against Saleh in September 2006. Hameed's success in the past is attributed to his very influential political family (Al-ahmer) of the now fragmented and weakened Hashid tribal coalition which once dominated Yemen's politics until the Houthi takeover of Sana'a.

On 7 October 2024, the United States Department of the Treasury placed sanctions on Hamid as a key member of Hamas’s investment portfolio.

== See also ==
- 2011 Yemeni protests
- Political parties in Yemen
