= Sadiq al-Ahmar =

Yemeni politician and tribal leader (1956–2023)

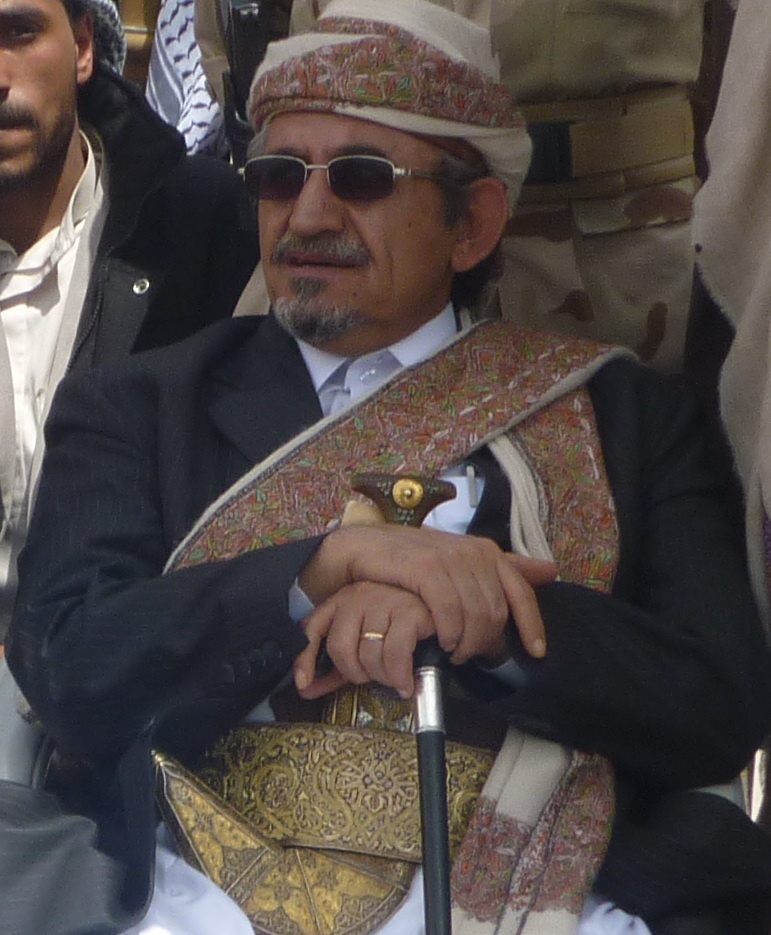
- Al-Ahmar in 2011

Member of Yemeni Parliament
- In office 1993–2003

Chief of Hashid Tribe Confederation
- In office 28 January 2008 – 6 January 2023
- Preceded by: Abdullah ibn Husayn al-Ahmar
- Succeeded by: Himyar Abdullah al-Ahmar

Personal details
- Born: 6 October 1956 Khamir District, Amran Governorate, North Yemen
- Died: 6 January 2023 (aged 66) Amman, Jordan
- Relations: Abdullah ibn Husayn al-Ahmar (father); Himyar Abdullah al-Ahmar (brother); Hamid al-Ahmar (brother)

Sheikh Sadiq bin Abdullah bin Hussein bin Nasser al-Ahmar (Arabic: الشيخ صادق الأحمر; 6 October 1956 – 6 January 2023) was a Yemeni politician and leader of the Hashid tribal federation. He succeeded his father Abdullah ibn Husayn al-Ahmar in these positions after Abdullah's death in 2007. He is best known for his role in the 2011 Yemeni uprising, in which fighters under his command attacked and seized government facilities in the Battle of Sana'a.

== Early life ==
Sadiq al-Ahmar was born on 6 October 1956, in the village of al-Khamri, located in the 'Amran Governorate of Yemen. His family moved to Sana'a after the establishment of North Yemen. He studied at the undergraduate level in Egypt until his father's relationship with the Egyptian government deteriorated, forcing Sadiq to move back to Yemen to complete his studies. Sadiq continued his studies in the United States beginning in 1982 after graduating in Yemen. He returned to Yemen shortly after earning his small aircraft pilot's licence in 1987.

== Political life ==
Al-Ahmar became a member of the Assembly of Representatives of Yemen in 1993, marking his formal entry into the Yemeni political system. He ascended to the position of tribal chief after the death of his father, Abdullah al-Ahmar, in late 2007. Unlike his father Abdullah, Sadiq and his brothers have not been seen as supporters of Ali Abdullah Saleh. Sadiq had publicly condemned al-Qaeda and had voiced some support for Saleh's war against the terror organisation, but remained critical and suspicious of the president's motives, declaring that Saleh's primary intent was not to combat terrorism but to extract aid money from the United States.

=== 2011 Yemeni uprising ===
In February 2011, he stepped down from his position in the Yemeni General People's Congress in solidarity with the growing popular protest movement in Yemen. Sadiq had initially tried to mediate between the opposition and Saleh, but after an incident on 18 March in which government troops opened fire on demonstrators, al-Ahmar formally broke with the regime and joined the opposition, prompting other tribal leaders to do the same. Sadiq's relationship with the government continued to deteriorate as the uprising continued, culminating in the Battle of Sana'a, in which guards and tribesmen loyal to him attacked government soldiers and facilities in Sana'a beginning on 24 May, the bloodiest fighting seen in Yemen since the beginning of the uprising. On 26 May, Saleh issued warrants for the arrest of Sadiq and the nine other al-Ahmar brothers, charging them with treason. On the same day, the tribal leader vehemently insisted that he would not seek mediation with Saleh, calling the president a "liar" and saying that Saleh would "leave [Yemen] barefoot" if left in power.

== Death ==
Al-Ahmar died of cancer in Jordan, on 6 January 2023, at the age of 66.
