= Hashid =

Yemeni tribal confederation

Hashid حاشد
- Hamdanite Qahtanite
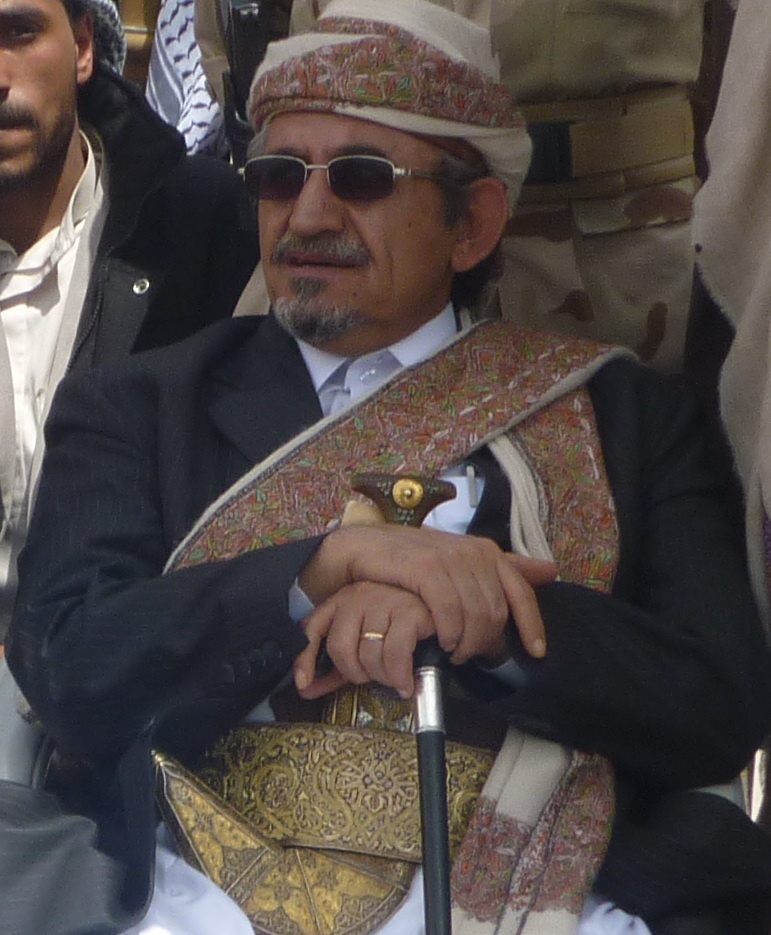
- Sadiq al-Aḥmar, former Sheikh of all sheikhs of Hashid
- Ethnicity: Arab
- Nisba: Al-Hāshidi
- Location: Yemen
- Descended from: Jusham bin Hubran bin Nawf bin Hamdan
- Parent tribe: Banu Hamdan
- Branches: Bani Suraym; Kharif; al-Usaymat; Idhar; Sanhan; Bilad al-Rus; Hamdan Sana'a; Yam
- Language: Arabic
- Religion: Islam

The Hashid (Arabic: حاشد, Ḥāshid) is a tribal confederation in Yemen. Together with Bakil, it forms the larger Hamdan confederation (Arabic: همدان, Hamdān), historically referred to as the "two wings" of Hamdan. Both names are pre-Islamic in origin. It is the second or third largest – after Bakil and, depending on sources, Madhhij – yet generally recognized as the strongest and most influential. According to medieval Yemeni genealogies, Hashid and Bakil are perceived as descendants of a common ancestor named Jusham bin Hubran bin Nawf bin Hamdan. The constituent tribes of Hashid are al-Usaymat, Idhar, Kharif, Bani Suraym, Sanhan, Bilad al-Rus, and Hamdan Sana'a. Member tribes of the Hashid Confederation are found primarily in the mountains north and northwest of Sana'a. The Saudi Yam tribe traces its genealogical descent through Jusham bin Hashid and thus shares common Hashidi ancestry with the constituent tribes of the Hashid confederation. However, Yam has long developed as a large, independent tribe based primarily in the Najran region of Saudi Arabia and is not part of the modern Hashid confederation's political structure.

In recent times, the Hashid confederation had for decades been led by Abdullah ibn Husayn al-Ahmar of al-Usaymat, who since the 1962 revolution served as its senior shaykh (Arabic: شيخ مشايخ, shaykh mashāyikh). He formed an alliance with the former President Ali Abdullah Saleh, who relied on this coalition to take power in 1978. Until his death on 29 December 2007, Sheikh Abdullah served as the Speaker of Parliament and was considered Yemen's second most powerful person after President Saleh (who, along with many others in the government, also was a member of a Hashid tribe).

After Sheikh Abdullah's death, his son Sadiq al-Ahmar inherited the leadership of the confederation, with other sons Hamid al-Ahmar, a prominent businessman and Yemeni opposition leader with the Muslim Brotherhood, and Himyar al-Ahmar, the former deputy speaker of parliament, becoming influential members. With the beginning of the Arab Spring, this new tribal leadership sided with the protesters and launched a Hashid insurgency, which played an essential role in the revolution against President Ali Abdullah Saleh in May 2011, culminating in the Battle of Sana'a and mass protests that eventually forced President Saleh to step down in February 2012 after 33 years in power. However, the resulting rift between the al-Ahmar clan and Saleh - who retained loyalty of some Hashid tribes - led to the divisions within the Hashid confederation. This, along with the suspension of financial support by Saudi Arabia over al-Ahmar's continued alliance with the Muslim Brotherhood, had contributed to their defeat in the ensuing conflict with the Houthis and led to the subsequent loss of Hashid leadership as many tribes (Bani Suraym, al-Usaymat, Idhar, etc.) reached a peace agreement or sided with the Houthis.

== History ==
=== Pre-Islamic history ===
Hashid was already a well known "tribe" (sha`b) since the 1st millennium BCE and it was very frequently mentioned in Sabaic inscriptions. The Hashid, alongside the tribes Humlan and Yarsum, were a part of a tribal confederation called the Sum'ay, and they worshipped the god Ta'lab. Banu Hamdan was mentioned in Sabaic inscriptions as qayls ("chiefs") of Hashid, later Banu Hamdan acquired control over a part of Bakil and finally gave their clan name to a tribal confederation including Hashid and Bakil. In the late 3rd century Banu Hamdan (and, consequently, Hashid and Bakil) switched their alliance to Himyar. Later some groups of Hamdan migrated to Syria.

=== Conversion to Islam ===
In the year 622, Muhammad sent Khalid ibn al-Walid to Yemen to call them to Islam. Khaled managed to convert the Najrani and Tihami Yemenis to Islam but he didn't get a warm response from the Hamdani Yemenis of the highlands. So Muhammad delegated the task to Ali ibn Abi Talib, who was much more successful in converting the Hamdani Yemenis.

After the death of Muhammad the Hamdan tribe remained Muslim and didn't join the ridda movement.

=== After Ali, Power Vacuum in Yemen and the Imam Hadi ===
The Hamdan tribe remained on the side of Ali, even after the martyrdom of Ali and later his sons. The tribes remained on alliance to Ali but didn't oppose the Umayyads or ally themselves with the other Shias.

At that time Yemen was experiencing a great population movement forming the bulk of the Islamic Expansion mainly settling in southern Iraq. However, the majority of the Hamdan tribe remained in Yemen which later helped the Hashid/Bakil Hamdani tribes become the biggest local key player, benefiting from the departure of the bulk of the most powerful Nomadic Yemeni tribes of that time into North Africa/Spain in Wetsward movements that continued until the 13th century.

By The 10th century the Imam al-Hadi Yahya bin al-Hussain bin al-Qasim (a scion of Imam al-Hasan, grandson of the Prophet) who, at Sa'da, in 893-7 C.E. arrived to the Northern Highlands on invitation from the Hamdan tribe and from that time till present day the Zaidi moderate Shia teachings became dominant in north Yemen.

=== Modern history ===
Hashid and Bakil have historically been referred to as the "two wings" of the Zaydi imamate. This designation reflects the fact that many tribes of both confederations adhered to Zaydi Islam and recognized the Zaydi imams – to varying degrees – as the heads of the Zaydi community and could, therefore, count on a measure of support and loyalty. Hoewever, the relationship between the tribes and the imamate was far from unambiguous. Not all tribes accepted the temporal and legal role that the imams claimed for themselves, and the tribes often jealously guarded their autonomy. Consequently, many imams (Imam Yahya and Imam Ahmad in the twentieth century included) complained bitterly about what they perceived as the tribes' inordinate political power and their resistance to imamic authority.

== See also ==
- Alliance of Yemeni Tribes

== Bibliography ==
- Korotayev, Andrey (1995). Ancient Yemen. Oxford: Oxford University Press. ISBN 0-19-922237-1. Archived from the original on 2023-11-29.
