= Law enforcement in Yemen =

Yemen's primary and most feared internal security and intelligence-gathering force is the Political Security Organization (PSO) جهاز الأمن السياسي, led by military officers; it reports directly to the president and operates its own detention centers. There are an estimated 150,000 personnel in the PSO. The Central Security Organization, which is part of the Ministry of Interior, maintains a paramilitary force and also has its own extrajudicial detention facilities. Also attached to the Ministry of Interior is the Criminal Investigative Department (CID) of the police, which conducts most criminal investigations and arrests. The total strength of the CID is estimated to be 13,000 personnel. According to the U.S. Department of State, members of the PSO and Ministry of Interior police forces have committed serious human rights violations, including physical abuse and lengthy detentions without formal charges. In 2002 the government established the National Security Bureau, which reports directly to the president and appears to have similar responsibilities to those of the PSO, but it remains unclear how the two organizations coordinate their responsibilities.
