= Arhab district =

Coordinates: 15°45′N 44°20′E

Arhab District مديرية أرحب
- District
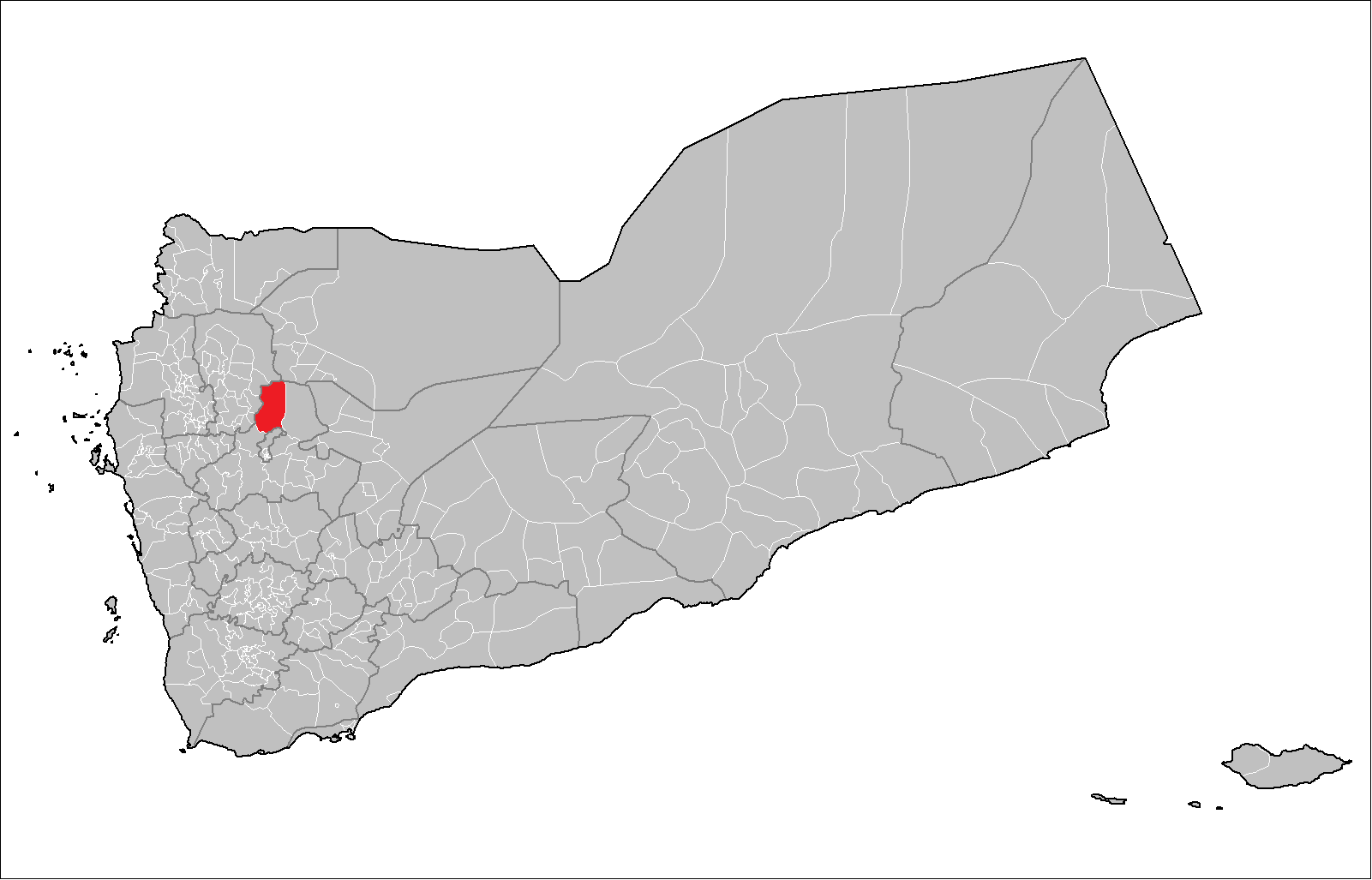
- Country: Yemen
- Governorate: Sana'a

Population (2003)
  - Total: 90,038
- Time zone: UTC+3 (Yemen Standard Time)

Arhab District (Arabic: مديرية شعوب) is a district of the Sana'a Governorate, Yemen. As of 2003, the district had a population of 90,038 inhabitants.
