= Muhammad al-Malishi =

Yemeni military officer (born 1967)

- Born: 1967 (age 58–59); Dhale, Dhale Governorate, South Yemen
- Military career
- Allegiance: South Yemen (1984-1990); (South Yemen) Popular Militia; Yemen (1990-1994); Hatem Movement; (South Yemen) Southern Movement; (South Yemen) Southern Transitional Council (2017–2026); (South Yemen) Southern Resistance (2026–present)
- Service years: 1984–present
- Conflicts: Yemeni civil war (2014–present); Battle in Al-Rukaba; 2026 Yemen offensives

Muhammad Abdullah al-Malishi (Note: Arabic: محمد عبدالله المليشي) (born 1967) is a Yemeni military officer who has served as the leader of the Southern Resistance in Dhale Governorate. He formerly served as the chief of staff of the 1st Support and Reinforcement Brigade, later commanded the 6th Thunderbolt Brigade of the Southern Transitional Council (STC).

Politically, in 2025, he publicly endorsed decisions by STC leader Aidarus al-Zoubaidi and described them as reflecting the political aspirations of separatist South Yemen movement.

== Biography ==
He was born in Dhale in 1967 and he began his military career in Popular Militia in 1984. Following his first job he moved onto the Paratroopers and Commandos in the Fifth Brigade, also working as the commander of the guard of Commander Muhammad Qasim Abdul Qawi, the commander of the Fifth Paratroopers Brigade, whom in 1994, during a confrontation, was fatally wounded, resulting also in the injury of Malishi himself. Following his injuries, and a period of medical care and evaluation in Saudi Arabia, he returned to Yemen and decided to join the Hatem Movement, where he first cooperated with Aidarus al-Zoubaidi, working on the movement's military wing. He was tasked by Aidarus to raid Al-Jarba camp using the forces of the former Southern Resistance.

Following the camp's liberation on 25 May 2015, he was assigned the role of commander of the rapid intervention by Aidarus and ordered to join the clashes in Sanah, nearby Dhale, against the Republican Guard and the Houthis, culminating in a battle in Al-Rukaba area. Despite facing a dangerous injury in the left part of his jaw from a bullet, he recovered pretty fast after being healed up in Al-Nasr Hospital in Dhale and then to Al-Shuaib Hospital, returning to the battlefield after five days. He was later ordered to participate in the conquest of Al-Musaymir, which, upon completion, led him to also be assigned a role in the conquest of Al-Anad Air Base, which was concluded in August 2019.

In 2016, on his way back to Dhale from Aden to visit his family as a small stop before heading to Hadramawt in order to train a STC militia cell, he was ambushed by elements of Al-Qaeda, who fired multiple ammunitions at him, injuring his leg and making it impossible for him to flee, securing his capture. He was taken to Abyan, and later to an Al-Qaeda prison in Hadramawt. Having been captured he begun a hunger strike which deteriorated his health conditions enough to induce the prison to take him to a local hospital. During his stay cells from the STC sorrounded the hospital and secured it, evacuating him and freeing him from the Al-Qaeda elements.

Having returned to Yemen following yet another brief hospital stay in neighbouring Oman, he was assigned by Zoubaidi to the Aden Protection Brigade, then later assigned to a new role by commander of the Fourth Military Region, Fadl Hassan, at a reconnaissance post of the Dhale axis. After that, he was assigned to the staff of the First Support and Reinforcement Brigade under the leadership of Commander Abu Al-Yamama.

Al-Malishi was active in the southern military movement during the years following the 2014 war in Yemen. By 2017, he held the rank of colonel and was identified as chief of staff of the 1st Support and Reinforcement Brigade, commanded by Munir al-Yafi (Abu al-Yamama). Al-Malishi spoke at the graduation ceremony for a battalion of the brigade at al-Jalaa camp in Aden, where he described the brigade's continuing efforts to train and prepare its personnel.

By November 2021, al-Malishi was identified as chief of staff of the 1st Thunderbolt Brigade. He participated in a meeting of the Southern Transitional Council's local leadership in Hadramout concerning the military situation in Shabwa and the Houthi advance into Baihan. The report identified him as Brigadier General Muhammad Abdullah Muqbil al-Malishi.

On 21 January 2022 Malishi's mother died, prompting Aidarus al-Zoubaidi to send his condolences.

In July 2025, Yemeni media reported that al-Malishi had been appointed commander of the 6th Southern Thunderbolt Brigade, replacing Brigadier General Obaid Qasim Larem. The appointment was reported as part of wider changes to southern military forces in Shabwa. In August 2025, reports recorded his participation in military and political activity concerning the formation's role in Shabwa.

In September 2026, al-Malishi emerged publicly as the commander of the Southern Resistance in Dhale Governorate. A statement issued by the Southern Resistance on 5 September 2026 was signed by him in that capacity. The local Southern Resistance fighters would later get involved in some operations within the context of the 2026 Yemen offensives against the Houthi.

== Political opinions ==
Al-Malishi has publicly supported the southern separatist movement and the political leadership of Aidarus al-Zoubaidi.
