= Southern Yemen campaign =

Topics referred to by the same term

Southern Yemen campaign or Southern Yemen offensive may refer to:

- South Yemeni crisis (1986)
- South Yemen insurgency (2009–2026)
- 2014 Southern Yemen offensive
- 2019 Southern Yemen clashes
- 2022 Southern Yemen offensive
- 2025–2026 Southern Yemen campaign

== See also ==
- List of wars involving Yemen
