= 2022 Southern Yemen offensive =

Military operation during the Yemini Civil War

- Part of the South Yemen insurgency and the Southern Transitional Council conflict
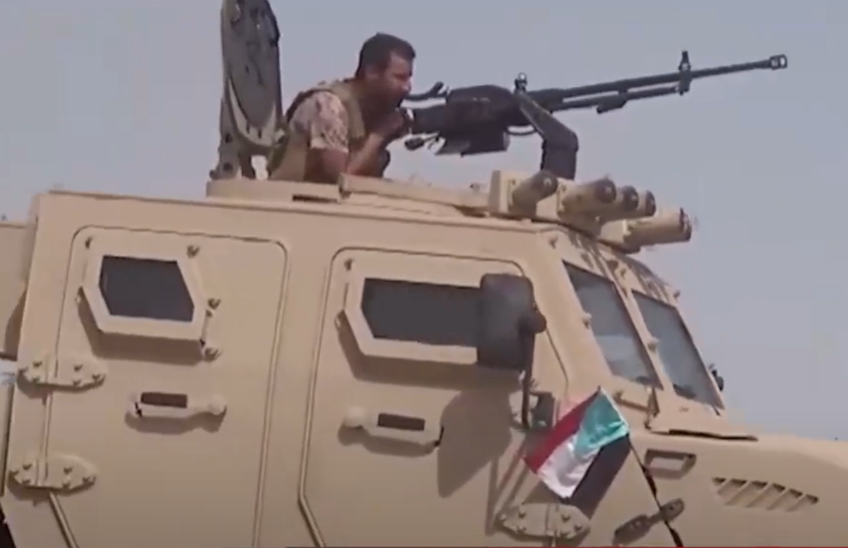
- Southern forces in Abyan province on a Nimr mobility vehicle, 24 August 2022
Date	7 August – 19 November 2022 (3 months, 1 week and 5 days)
Location	Abyan and Shabwah provinces, Yemen
Result	STC victory
Territorial changes	Southern forces capture most districts of Abyan and Shabwah provinces

Belligerents
Southern Transitional Council (STC) United Arab Emirates (alleged)	Presidential Leadership Council: Islah party; al-Qaeda: AQAP; Supreme Political Council: Houthi movement

Commanders and leaders
Yasser Nasser Shaye †	Unknown

Units involved
Pro-Southern Movement forces: Security Belt; STC militias; Shabwah Defence Forces; Southern Giants Brigades; United Arab Emirates Armed Forces (alleged)	Yemen Army; Special Security Forces: Islah party militias; Houthi loyalists in Shabwah

Casualties and losses
46 killed, 136 wounded (September–November)	Unknown
- 80+ killed, 68+ wounded overall (August)

In August 2022, forces of Yemen's Emirati-backed separatist Southern Movement, mainly represented by the Southern Transitional Council, launched an offensive in the Abyan and Shabwah provinces. Initially, the Southern forces mostly fought against Saudi-backed government forces, most of which belonged to the armed wing of the Islah party. Since early September 2022, however, the Southern Movement's offensive has become more focused on battling local al-Qaeda strongholds.

== Background ==
Since 2014, Yemen has been engulfed in a civil war fought between several factions. These can be divided into two main camps: the Houthi movement, which dominates northern Yemen, and a loose coalition of anti-Houthi forces that hold the remaining parts of the country. However, the anti-Houthi camp has often been affected by infighting, as it includes groups which support the union of Yemen—backed by Saudi Arabia—as well as pro-separatist Southern Movement groups, most importantly the Emirati-supported STC. In an attempt to end the fighting, the United Nations organized a ceasefire between the Houthis and their enemies, while the anti-Houthi camp organized a new central government in form of the Presidential Leadership Council (PLC). The PLC includes both pro-union and pro-separatist figures.

Whereas the ceasefire largely held, the PLC failed to resolve the tensions among the anti-Houthi camp. In addition, the power of pro-union forces such as the Islah party declined, while the popularity of southern separatist ideas rose in the territories held by the anti-Houthi camp. The growing tensions within the PLC ultimately escalated in August 2022.

== Offensive ==
On 7 August 2022, heavy clashes erupted in Ataq between Southern and government troops. On 8 August, missiles struck Ataq Airport, hitting Southern forces. Tanks and soldiers were deployed in the city and dozens of families fled.

On 10 August, after three days heavy clashes, Southern forces took control of Shabwah's capital Ataq, forcing government troops to withdraw to other districts. On the same day after heavy clashes Southern forces captured base of 2nd Mountain Infantry Brigade in Azzan. Government forces also reportedly withdrew from military sites in Nisab, Radhum, Habban and Mayfa'a districts. According to unnamed officials cited by AP at least 35 people were killed in clashes. Unconfirmed reports alleged that the STC forces in Shabwah were supported by drone strikes carried out by the United Arab Emirates Armed Forces.

On 12 August, a suspected U.A.E. drone struck position of armed forces in Hadramawt governorate. On 13 August dispute over military building resulted in clashes between Giant Forces and Shabwah Defense Forces (SDF) in Ataq during which SDF commander was killed. On 15 August, U.A.E. drone struck military position in Shabwah allowing southern forces to advance towards Marib and Hadramawt. One civilian was killed in strike on Jardan District. Clashes reportedly continued on 17 August with Southern forces using heavy artillery and drones.

A few days later separatist forces captured important oil fields in the Shwabwah province. On 21 August it was reported that government forces decided to hand control over Shuqra and the areas of Qarn al-Kalasi and Al-Arqub to separatist forces. Also Ayaz area, the Alam base and the Ayaz oil field were reported to be under Southern control, with heavy clashes ongoing around the Al-Uqla oil fields and along the Ataq-Abar road. Later that day Southern forces took control of Al-Uqlah oil field and moved towards the district of Arma.

On 22 August, Southern forces launched an operation called "Arrows of the East" in the Abyan governorate, entering Shuqrah early the next day. The separatists officially claimed that they were clearing the area of "terrorists" such as al-Qaeda (and its local branch AQAP). Later on 22 August, they took control of Shuqrah–Ahwar road, with the separatists claiming to control 90% of the Abyan province. PLC President Rashad al-Alimi ordered the STC to stop its attacks, but his commands were ignored. They also captured Khobar al-Maraqisha area and finally Ahwar District. Dozens of people were reportedly killed and wounded. On 27 August, police forces led by Brigadier General Ali Nasser Al-Kazmi were deployed in Zinjibar with agreement of STC forces. Meanwhile, heavy fighting continued at several locations across Shabwa.

On 31 August, Southern forces entered Lawdar in Abyan without a fight. They had negotiated a takeover with local officials who had previously been loyal to ex-President Abdrabbuh Mansur Hadi, but had been "cast adrift by his ouster" due to the formation of the PLC. On 6 September, al-Qaeda launched attack on Southern forces in Ahwar. Twenty members of the Southern Security Belt's Anti-Terror Brigade and six attackers were killed. Two days later, Saudi Arabia invited "army and security leaders" from Shabwah and Abyan for "consultations", possibly in relation to the Southern offensive.

On 10 September, Southern forces announced offensive against al-Qaeda in Khaber Al-Marakesha area in Abyan and Al-Musainah region in Shabwah governatore. AQAP troops reportedly fled to mountainous area between Shabwah, Abyan and Bayda provinces.

On 11 September, Southern forces entered Al-Wadea and Mudiyah districts in Abyan. On 12 September three Southern Yemeni soldiers were killed and six wounded in clashes with Al-Qaeda east of Moudia. On 13 September Southern forces reportedly arrived on the outskirts of Mahfad district. On 14 September, Southern forces entered Wadi Omaran east of Mudiyah, clashing with Al-Qaeda. One soldier was killed and nine injured in two attacks by Al-Qaeda. Southern forces claimed to have killed dozens of Al-Qaeda militiamen using drones and capturing parts of the valley. The next day they reportedly started dismantling explosive devices inside the valley. On 18 September, Southern forces announced full control over Wadi Omaran. The battle for Wadi Omaran had resulted in the death of at least 32 soldiers and 24 militants. On 20 September after clearing Wadi Omaran from explosive devices Southern forces moved to "Rabeez" area, while Al-Qaeda retreated to "Al-Hanka".

On early 8 October, Southern forces were deployed in Mahfad district. Al-Qaeda forces reportedly fled to mountainous areas afterwards. On 11 October, Southern forces cleared "Wadi Daiyqa" on the western outskirts of Mahfad district. On 2 November, separatist authorities stated that they had eliminated a terrorist cell allegedly loyal to the Houthi movement in Shabwa; this group had reportedly planned to kill Shabwa's governor Awadh Al-Wazer as well as military officers. By 5 November, Southern troops spearheaded by the STC fighters had advanced into al-Khealah valley, south of Mahfad district, dislodging its al-Qaeda garrison. The local jihadists offered little resistance, but two Southern fighters were killed by a roadside bomb. On 19 November, an al-Qaeda bomb killed three Southern fighters and wounded two in Wadi Omaran.

== Analysis ==
As the STC is formally part of the Yemeni government, Saudi analyst Abdul-Aziz Alkhames argued that the offensive should not be seen as a revolt. Instead, the STC was mostly focusing on defeating the Islah party which the STC believed to work against Yemeni interests and accused of cooperating with the Houthi movement. However, Alkhames also opinioned that the offensive showcased how "the call for some sort of autonomy for Southern Yemen is becoming more 'acceptable' to certain parties now. [...] It is becoming more evident that southerners will not accept the full rule of Sanaa again." Regardless of the STC's aims, the infighting further weakened the Yemeni central government, as well as its regular military. In addition, the offensive further cemented the ongoing decline of the once-powerful Islah party.

Following the conclusion of the clashes between government and Southern forces, the separatists targeted local al-Qaeda strongholds. South24 journalist Ibrahim Ali argued that AQAP was weakened to significant degree due to the decline of the Islah party (which had sometimes tolerated its presence), the loss of several strongholds to the separatists, and the reduction of its ability to move freely in the region. However, Ali also cautioned that AQAP was reorganizing and possibly redirecting its attacks in order to draw attention away from its remaining hideouts, with the group essentially trying to hold out until the counter-insurgency operations were being reduced. Thus, any lasting success of the anti-AQAP operations was tied to their continuation for an extended period.

== See also ==
- Southern Transitional Council takeover of Socotra
- 2025 Hadhramaut offensive
