= 2019 Southern Yemen clashes =

2019 conflict in Aden between the Hadi government and southern separatists

Southern Yemen clashes
- Part of the South Yemen insurgency, Saudi Arabian-led intervention in Yemen, the Aden unrest (2015–2019), and the Southern Transitional Council conflict
Date	August 7, 2019 – August 29, 2019 (3 weeks and 1 day)
Location	Aden 12.8°N 45.033333°E
Result	STC victory: STC forces take control of Aden and Zinjibar, and parts of Abyan, Lahij and Shabwah governorates.; Riyadh Agreement reached between the warring parties

Belligerents
Yemen Army (Hadi government): Presidential Guard; Supported by: Saudi Arabia	Southern Transitional Council (STC): Security Belt Forces; Supported by: United Arab Emirates

Casualties and losses
Unknown	Unknown
- 40+ killed 260+ injured On both sides as of 11 August 2019
- Location of Aden in Yemen

The Southern Yemen clashes were a series of clashes in the city of Aden between the pro-Hadi government troops backed by Saudi Arabia and Southern Transitional Council forces backed by the United Arab Emirates. The Southern Transitional Council took control of Aden and Zinjibar.

== Clashes ==
=== Battle in Aden ===
Clashes erupted on 7 August 2019 between the STC and pro-Hadi forces in Aden after a missile strike by Houthis killed several soldiers of the Security Belt forces in the city during a military graduation. The soldiers killed included Brig. Gen. Munir Mahmoud Ahmad al-Mashali al-Yafaei, more commonly known as Abu Yamamah al-Yafaei, a leading figure and commander in the Security Belt. The southerners accused the Hadi-led government, as well as Al-Islah party members who are part of the Hadi-led government but harbor deep resentment with the STC, for enabling the attack. The STC released a statement calling the attack "treacherous". The next day, three people were killed and ten were injured in clashes between the pro-Hadi presidential guard based in Aden and southern separatists on 8 August 2019 following the funeral for the victims killed in the Houthi attack. STC took control of Aden's Crater District on 9 August 2019. The STC captured the Badr Camp and the presidential palace on 10 August and a total of 20 people were killed. The Saudi-led coalition launched airstrikes against the STC on the same day.

=== Ceasefire ===
Clashes ceased briefly on 11 August 2019 following a meeting between Saudi Crown Prince Mohammed bin Salman and the United Arab Emirates. The STC agreed to withdraw from several checkpoints it had captured during the clashes and the UAE denied supporting the STC's clashes against the Saudi-led coalition. The STC vacated some positions in Aden on 17 August 2019.

=== Continued clashes ===
Clashes continued with lower intensity in Aden on 16 August 2019 after STC forces refused to withdraw from some of their captured positions. On 21 August, the UAE rejected allegations that it was behind the developments in Aden.

On 28 August 2019, Hadi-led forces recaptured most of the neighborhoods they had lost to the STC, including Aden's International Airport. By the next day, however, STC forces recaptured most of Aden again. The Hadi-led government accused the UAE of launching airstrikes against its troops, killing at least 30 troops.

=== Clashes elsewhere in Yemen ===
Clashes between the STC and Hadi forces erupted in Shabwah Governorate on 22 August 2019 after STC forces refused to withdraw from al-Akaf checkpoint. There were dead and wounded in the clashes which included heavy weapons. The Hadi government accused the command of the STC for blowing up the situation in Shabwah.

Clashes occurred in Abyan Governorate on 20 August 2019 after STC forces took control of a camp in Az Zanjabar; several were killed in the clashes.

=== Peace agreement ===
On 5 November 2019, the Riyadh Agreement was signed by the warring sides, leading to an official end to the conflict and fighting. Despite this, tensions continued to increase between both sides and the STC withdrew from the peace deal in August 2022.

== See also ==
- Aden unrest (2015–2019)
- South Yemen insurgency
