= Riyadh Agreement =

2019 Yemen ceasefire agreement

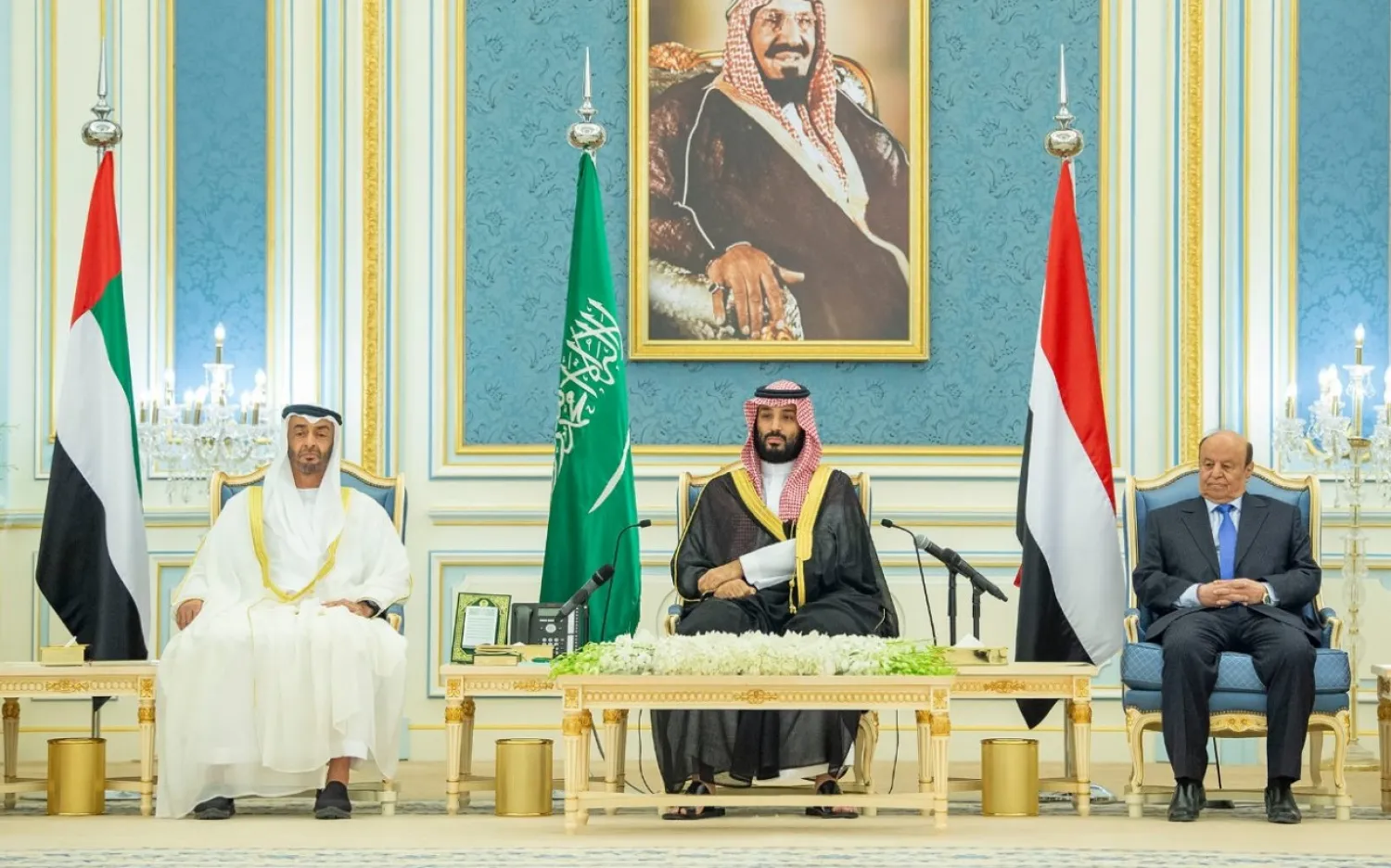
- Mohammed bin Salman, Muhammad bin Zayid, and Abdrabbuh Mansur Hadi attending the signing ceremony of the Riyadh agreement
- Type: Peace treaty
- Signed: 5 November 2019
- Location: Riyadh, Saudi Arabia
- Mediators: Saudi Arabia
- Signatories: (United Arab Emirates) Muhammad bin Zayid Al Nahyan; (Yemen) Abdrabbuh Mansur Hadi; (South Yemen) Aydarus al-Zubaydi
- Parties: United Arab Emirates; (Yemen) Yemeni government; (South Yemen) Southern Transitional Council
- Language: Arabic

The Riyadh Agreement (Arabic: اتفاق الرياض, romanized: Ittifāq ar-Riyāḏ) was signed on 5 November 2019 in the capital city of Saudi Arabia, Riyadh, between Abdrabbuh Mansur Hadi, representing the Saudi-backed government of Yemen, Muhammad bin Zayid Al Nahyan, representing the United Arab Emirates, and Aydarus al-Zubaydi, representing the UAE-backed Southern Transitional Council (STC). It followed the Southern Yemen clashes of August 2019, with the goal of ending the fighting and establishing a united front against the Iran-backed Houthi rebels, dominant in the north of the country.

== Details ==
The agreement centered around the Yemeni government recognizing the legitimacy of the STC and allowing them into the government, in exchange for the STC withdrawing militarily from Aden and giving up some security control in the south of the country. The agreement also laid out a number of changes to Yemen's political situation. Foremost among these was changing the maximum number of ministers in the cabinet from 30 to 24, specifying that, of these cabinet positions, they must be equally distributed between northern and southern Yemenis. It also ordered the redeployment of both government and STC forces away from Aden, with the security inside the city being overseen by the Saudi military. Additionally, all military and security units of the STC were to be integrated under the Yemeni Ministries of Interior and Defence.

== Aftermath ==
The agreement's terms have for the most part gone unimplemented, and resulted in little change. While the agreement succeeded at establishing local ceasefires in Abyan Governorate, its major objectives have almost all been ignored and unimplemented, and all the deadlines specified in the agreement were missed. A unity cabinet was established one year after the agreement was signed, and new governors were appointed for two governorates of Shabwah and Aden, however, government and STC forces both failed to withdraw from Aden, most governorates' governors have not been changed, and the STC's military and security units have not been integrated under the Yemeni Ministries of Interior and Defence. The agreement effectively ended with a de facto partition of the country between STC and Yemeni Government control, failing to establish the national unity it had aimed to create. Opposing political factions also took the ceasefire arising from the agreement as an opportunity to abduct and assassinate a number of their political opponents in Aden, particularly those of the STC and Al-Islah party. On 1 January 2020, the STC pulled out of participation in joint committees working to implement the deal, and on 25 August of the same year, following its re-militarization of Abyan Governorate, the STC officially suspended their participation in all talks relating to the agreement's implementation.

== International reactions ==
- Saudi Arabia's crown prince Muhammad bin Salman praised the agreement, saying it was "a milestone towards a political solution to end the war in Yemen".
- The United Nations welcomed the agreement, calling it "a pivotal step towards a lasting political resolution to the conflict in Yemen”.
- Iran's foreign ministry condemned the agreement, stating that “signing such documents will by no means help settle the problems of Yemen".
- The United Arab Emirates said that they hoped the agreement would lead to the implementation of a political solution to the crisis in Yemen.
- Mohammed al-Houthi, the de facto president of the Houthi-led government in Sanaa, stated that the agreement was not in the interests of the Yemeni people.
- A spokesperson for the Southern Transitional Council declared that the agreement represents "a strategic step towards achieving the Southern Transitional Council project and its goals of liberation and independence"
- The Yemeni government's president Abdrabbuh Mansur Hadi declared his support for the agreement, and requested Saudi Arabia's aid in its implementation.
- The Supreme Council of the Revolutionary Movement for the Peaceful Liberation and Independence of the South issued a statement rejecting the agreement and urging the expulsion of both UAE and Saudi Arabian forces from the south of Yemen.
- The agreement was criticized by Human Rights Watch for failing to address human rights abuses by Yemeni security forces.

== See also ==
- National Dialogue Conference
- Yemeni peace process
