= Fall of Aden (2026) =

Battle in the Yemeni Civil War

- Part of the 2025–2026 southern Yemen campaign and the Southern Transitional Council conflict of the Yemeni civil war (2014–present)
Date	7 January 2026
Location	Aden, Yemen
Result	PLC–Saudi victory; Collapse of the STC
Territorial changes	PLC takes full control of Aden and surrounding governorates

Belligerents
(Yemen) Yemeni Government (PLC); Saudi Arabia	Southern Transitional Council (STC)

Commanders and leaders
	(Southern Transitional Council) Aidarus al-Zoubaidi (AWOL)

On 7 January 2026, the Yemeni government (Presidential Leadership Council, PLC) forces captured the Southern Transitional Council's de facto capital, Aden, resulting in the STC's reported dissolution and the collapse of the group's forces in the area. The city's capture was the culmination of a government counteroffensive against the STC that had previously captured Hadhramaut and al-Mahrah Governorates amid Saudi airstrikes against STC positions. Following Aden's capture, the secretary-general of the STC announced its dissolution and its leader Aidarus al-Zoubaidi fled to the United Arab Emirates.

== Background ==
Aden has changed hands several times over the course of the current civil war. In 2015, it was designated as the "temporary capital" of Yemen following the Houthi takeover of Sanaa. A few weeks later, the Battle of Aden broke out between the Houthis and PLC. Despite Abdrabbuh Mansour Hadi fleeing Aden, the government forces successfully recaptured the city and drove the Houthis out of the surrounding area. In 2018, the STC gained control of Aden and has held the city since.

=== 2025–2026 offensive ===
A 2025 offensive by the STC gained large swathes of territory in southern and eastern Yemen. In early 2026, the Saudi-backed PLC launched a counteroffensive that took back much of the land in eastern Yemen with the assistance of Saudi airstrikes. On 7 January, the Saudi-backed forces began advancing towards Aden, launching airstrikes against STC forces in the region.

== Battle ==
On 7 January 2026, Saudi Arabia launched airstrikes against the UAE-backed STC forces around Aden. The government army first entered the area at Al-Alam and moved into the city from there. PLC forces captured the city's international airport and the presidential palace. The PLC claimed total control over the city and all districts of the governorate, but the STC denied these claims, saying that they still held control over some areas.

== Aftermath ==
After Aden's fall to the PLC, Zoubaidi went missing for a brief period of time. He had been expected to fly to Riyadh for peace talks but did not arrive to board his plane. The Yemeni government charged Zoubaidi with high treason on 7 January. On 8 January, Saudi Arabia claimed that Zoubaidi had fled Aden by boat during the night to Somaliland, where he was then flown to the UAE via Mogadishu. The STC maintains that Zoubaidi remains in Aden.

A curfew was imposed on the city on 7 January after the battle, and was lifted on 9 January. The flag of Yemen was raised over government buildings in the city by PLC troops.

On 9 January, the STC was reportedly dissolved by its secretary-general. However, others in the group's leadership have refuted this, claiming that the STC is still active.
