= Battle of Aden (2018) =

Capture of the Yemeni city by the Southern Transitional Council

- Part of the Yemeni Civil War (2014–present), Saudi Arabian-led intervention in Yemen, Southern Transitional Council conflict, and the Aden unrest (2015–2019)
- Situation in Aden during the battle
Date	28–31 January 2018 (3 days)
Location	Aden, Yemen 12.8°N 45.033333°E
Result	STC victory
Territorial changes	STC gains control of most of Aden, which is then given back to government forces by February 2018.; STC took over Lahij and Dhale governorates.

Belligerents
Yemen Army (Hadi government): Presidential Guard; Al-Islah; Supported by: Saudi Arabia	Southern Transitional Council (STC): Southern Movement; Southern Resistance Forces (SRF); Security Belt Forces; Supported by: Kuwait (commandos SF); United Arab Emirates

Commanders and leaders
(Yemen) Abdrabbuh Mansur Hadi (Yemen) Ahmed Obeid bin Daghr (Yemen) Ali Mohsen al-Ahmar	Aydarus al-Zubaydi; Hani bin Burayk (Kuwait) Aser Abdullah Al-Anezi

Strength
	Kuwait: 30-60 commandos Thousands; Hundreds of demonstrators

Casualties and losses
250 killed 745 wounded	94 Yemenis killed 6 commandos wounded
- 40 people killed (3 civilians) 222 wounded, and 40,000 without aid
- Location within Yemen

The Battle of Aden was a conflict between the Southern Transitional Council (STC) and the Yemeni government around the headquarters in Aden.

== Background ==
In Yemen, separatists have been calling for the independence of South Yemen, which was until 1990 an independent state officially known as the People's Democratic Republic of Yemen, with its state capital as Aden. After its incorporation into the Yemen Arab Republic, there were two major attempts to secede, the Yemeni Civil War of 1994 and the South Yemen insurgency (2009–present).

The Southern Transitional Council was created in May 2017. The governor of Aden Aydarus al-Zubaydi, dismissed from his office on 27 April 2017 by Yemeni President Abdrabbuh Mansur Hadi, became its leader.

The Southern National Assembly, made up of 303 members from every southern province, held its first parliamentary session in Aden on 26 December 2017.

Amid tensions between the UAE-backed Southern Transitional Council and the Saudi-backed Hadi government in Aden, the STC announced on 21 January 2018 that it would overthrow the Yemeni government within a week unless President Hadi sacked his entire cabinet, including Prime Minister Ahmed Obeid bin Daghr for corruption. The STC also declared a state of emergency until its demands were met. The government responded by banning protests in Aden, but the STC organised an anti-government rally for 28 January 2018.

== Timeline ==
=== Outbreak of fighting ===
Gun battles erupted in Aden on 28 January 2018 when security forces loyal to the Hadi government attempted to prevent pro-STC demonstrators from entering the city. Districts reportedly affected by the fighting included Khormaksar, al-Mansoura, and Dar Sad, with protests taking place in al-Orouth square. Pro-STC forces were reported to have seized a number of government offices, including the Hadi government's headquarters.

=== 28 January ===
The STC captured the government headquarters in Aden. The government also ordered its own troops to return to base, following fierce clashes across Aden. The fighting subsided by the evening after Prime Minister Daghr ordered a truce and instructed forces loyal to the government to return to barracks, witnesses said. In the night, the fighting continued.

=== 29 January ===
Renewed fighting broke out after a brief ceasefire declared the previous day collapsed. The STC sent reinforcements from Dhale and Shabwah provinces to Aden. Tank and heavy artillery battles were also fought that day, killing five STC fighters and four Yemeni government soldiers. The Presidential Forces led by Brigadier General Abdullah al-Subaihi began shelling Mount Hadid, which overlooks the 1st brigade for Security Belt Forces and is run by Major General Aydarus al-Zubaydi. The two sides deployed tanks and began shelling one another in Khormaksar district, where snipers were on the roofs of buildings. The fighting moved into Crater district, and schools were closed for a second consecutive day.

The STC would go on to proclaim victory on the 30 January.

=== 30 January ===
On the 30 January 2018, the STC claimed it had seized the entirety of Aden.

The members of the Hadi-government present in Aden, including the Prime Minister, were surrounded in the Presidential Palace and "de facto under house arrest" but the STC did not enter the palace. Yemen's prime minister prepared to flee the country for Saudi Arabia after the STC seized the area around the presidential palace in the southern city of Aden in fierce battles overnight.

The charity Save the Children suspended humanitarian work in the city due to the fighting.

The STC seized the Dar Sad District, which was the last pro-Hadi stronghold, having captured the Crater and Tawahi districts earlier. Residents have said that the STC captured most of the city by day's end.

=== 31 January ===
On the 31 January, separatists took the office of the prime minister's secretary, but fighting no longer took place. The government and the STC exchanged prisoners after the fighting.

== Reactions ==
=== National ===
- Yemen – Prime Minister Ahmed Obeid bin Daghr stated that "a coup is ongoing here in Aden against legitimacy and the country's unity," and asked Saudi Arabia for military support.
- Yemen – President Abdrabbuh Mansur Hadi ordered his forces to cease fire immediately after fierce clashes with southern separatists broke out in Aden. On 30 January Hadi called the clashes "nothing short of a coup".
- (South Yemen) Southern Transitional Council – The Vice President of the STC Hani bin Burayk blamed Hadi's government for the fighting in a Twitter post: "They forced us to put on our military uniforms, although we told them we were non-violent. But we were ready." On 22 January, STC president Aydarus al-Zubaydi accused the Hadi and Daghr-led government of "rampant corruption".
- (South Yemen) Southern Transitional Council – Al-Zubaydi declared a state of emergency in Aden and that "the STC has begun the process of overthrowing Hadi's rule over the South". On 30 January al-Zubaydi via France 24 announced full military cooperation between his forces and Tareq Saleh to liberate the remaining northern strongholds.

=== International ===
- France – France's Foreign Ministry expressed concern over the fighting and urged both sides to negotiate.
- Saudi Arabian-led coalition called everyone involved to hold back. The protests in Aden were an invitation to turn down mistakes in government work.

== See also ==
- Aden unrest (2015–2019)
- South Yemen insurgency
