= Hatem Movement =

Former military organization in Yemen

- حركة حتم تقرير المصير
- Logo of the organization
- Other name: Movement for the Right to Self-Determination
- Founder: Aidarus al-Zoubaidi
- Founded: 1995/1996 (Disputed)
- Dissolved: 21 September 2014 (disputed) (Note: Last recorded activity according to Barren Press, whilst the European Country of Origin Information Network argues it merely lost its social, military and power dynamic status within the wider habitat of Southern Movements)
- Country: Yemen (Note: If the movement was truly founded in 1995 as some sources dispute, it'd mean that the movement was not founded in Yemen, but rather it was founded in Djibouti)
- Allegiance: (South Yemen) Southern Movement
- Ideology: Separatism

The commonly known HATEM Movement (Arabic: حركة حتم; Ḥarakat Ḥatm), officially, within its former ranks, referred to as the Movement for the Right to Self-Determination (Arabic: حركة تقرير المصير), was a southern Yemeni political and armed movement founded in the aftermath of the 1994 Yemeni civil war. The movement advocated the self-determination of the people of South Yemen and opposed, through military means, the political and military order established following the defeat of southern separatist forces in 1994. It was founded and led by Aidarus al-Zoubaidi.

== History ==
Following the defeat of the southern forces in the 1994 Yemeni civil war, Aidarus al-Zoubaidi left Yemen for Djibouti. According to Zoubadi himself, he returned to Yemen in 1996 and established the Self-Determination Movement, commonly known by its Arabic acronym HATEM (حتم), however, according to reports by The Malcolm H. Kerr Carnegie Middle East Center, the movement was founded earlier before his return to Yemen in 1995. The movement advocated the restoration of the former state of South Yemen and opposed the political order established after the 1994 civil war. Al Jazeera describes HATEM as the first southern movement led by al-Zoubaidi to adopt armed operations against government forces.

In 1997, al-Zoubaidi was tried by a Yemeni military court in absentia for his leadership of HATEM and was sentenced to death along with a number of associates. The sentence did not result in his execution because he remained outside government custody. In 2000, President Ali Abdullah Saleh granted al-Zoubaidi an amnesty, which resulted in the cancellation of the death sentence against him. Following the amnesty, al-Zoubaidi entered political activity through the Joint Meeting Parties, a coalition of Yemeni opposition parties.

HATEM's activity subsequently declined. Sources consistently place the end of its first period of activity in 2002. The organization briefly appeared again in the year 2011, stating it'd resume its activities against the PLC. In 2012 the group started making small armed divisions, and in 2013, the group was reported to have clashed against the Houthis. According to Barran Press, operations continued up until the fall of Sanaa on 21 September 2014, whilst the European Country of Origin Information Network states that whilst the organization did not dissolve it declined in power and visibility being outshadowed by other southern organizations.
