= Battle of Aden =

The Battle of Aden may refer to:

- Siege of Aden (1513), Portuguese attack on Aden
- Aden Revolt (1548), Ottoman capture of Aden
- Battle of Aden (1586), Portuguese campaign on Aden
- Aden Expedition (1839), British capture of Aden
- Withdrawal from Aden (1967), British withdrawal from Aden
- Battle of Aden Airport (2015), fought between the Hadi-led government, Houthi rebels and Saleh loyalists
- Battle of Aden (2015), fought between the Hadi-led government, Houthi rebels and Saleh loyalists
- Battle of Aden (2018), fought between the Hadi-led government and the Southern Transitional Council (STC)
- Fall of Aden (2026), fought between the PLC-led government and the Southern Transitional Council (STC)

== See also ==
- Battle of Sanaa (disambiguation)
