= Southern Transitional Council conflict =

Event of the Yemeni civil war (2017–2026)

- Part of the Middle Eastern crisis (2023–present) and South Yemen insurgency
- Political and military control in Yemen at the maximum extent of the STC's territory, following the STC offensive UN-recognized Republic of Yemen (PLC) Southern Transitional Council Supreme Political Council (Houthis) Yemeni National Resistance
Date	11 May 2017 – 9 January 2026 (8 years, 7 months, 4 weeks and 1 day)
Location	Southern Yemen
Result	PLC–Saudi victory: Creation of the Presidential Leadership Council in 2022; Southern Transitional Council dissolves itself on 9 January 2026
Territorial changes	The STC initially held around 52% of Yemen's territory, including almost the entirety of former South Yemen; Following the counteroffensive, the STC lost all its gains along with its capital of Aden; UAE withdraws from Yemen

Belligerents
Southern Transitional Council (STC); Supported by: United Arab Emirates	(Yemen) Yemeni Government; Hadi government (until 2022); Presidential Leadership Council (since 2022); Hadhramaut Tribal Alliance (HTA); Al-Islah; Saudi Arabia	Supreme Political Council (Houthis) al-Qaeda in the Arabian Peninsula Islamic State

Commanders and leaders
Aidarus al-Zoubaidi (AWOL)	(Yemen) Abdrabbuh Mansour Hadi (2017–2022) (Yemen) Rashad al-Alimi	(Houthis) Abdul-Malik al-Houthi; Mahdi al-Mashat

Units involved
Southern Armed Forces; Hadhrami Elite Forces; Shabwah Defence Forces	Yemeni Armed Forces; Homeland Shield Forces; Yemeni Land Forces; Hadhramaut Protection Forces; Armed Forces of Saudi Arabia; Royal Saudi Air Force; Royal Saudi Navy	Yemeni Armed Forces Ansar al-Sharia Yemen Province

The Southern Transitional Council conflict was a sub-conflict of the Yemeni Civil War, between the separatist Southern Transitional Council (STC) and other factions, mainly the internationally-backed government in Yemen. The STC was supported by the United Arab Emirates, despite the UAE being a member of the Saudi Arabian-led coalition working to support the Yemeni government.

In 2022, the STC became part of the newly founded Presidential Leadership Council (PLC). In December 2025, the STC launched an offensive claiming much of South Yemen. STC soon thereafter proclaimed a two-year-long process for self-determination. After the Saudi-led coalition launched a counter-offensive, the STC announced its dissolution of 9 January 2026 ending the conflict.

== Background ==
In 2007, Southern Movement was founded as a peaceful independence movement. It gained political power after the Yemeni revolution and Saudi-led intervention when it sided with the Hadi government against Houthis.

== Timeline ==
=== 2017 ===
In the end of April 2017, Governor of the Aden Governorate Aidarus al-Zoubaidi was sacked by President Abdrabbuh Mansur Hadi, with the reason of disloyalty to him, and loyalty to the Southern Movement. On 3 May 2017, major rallies were held in Aden to protest the decision of Hadi. One week later, Southern Transitional Council was formed, and some of the members were the governors of Dhale, Shabwah, Hadhramaut, Lahij, Socotra, and Al Mahrah governorates. It also have partial control in Abyan and Aden governorates. One day later, Hadi rejected the council, and called it illegitimate.

=== 2018 ===
- 28 January 2018 – Beginning of the Battle of Aden (2018) between the Yemeni Government and the Southern Transitional Council (STC)
- 30 January 2018 – STC conquers Aden

=== 2020 ===
- 25 April – the STC announces self-governance.
- 21 June – the STC takes seizes Socotra.

=== 2022 ===
- 7 April 2022 – president Abdrabbuh Mansour Hadi delegated his power to the Presidential Leadership Council which included STC members like Aidarus al-Zoubaidi.
- 7 August 2022 – the STC started an offensive in the Ayban province.

=== 2025 ===
- 2 December – STC forces launch an offensive and seize towns in Wadi Hadramaut, including Seiyun and Tarim, and later the Mahrah's governatore capital Al-Ghaydah. Before the end of the month, the STC controlled around 52% of Yemen's territory, including almost the entirety of former South Yemen.
- 30 December – Saudi Arabia strikes the port city of Mukalla, targeting what it said was a shipment of weapons that had arrived from the UAE. Later that day, the UAE announced it would voluntarily withdraw its remaining forces from Yemen following the Saudi strikes.

=== 2026 ===
- 2 January – the STC announces an independence referendum after a two-year transition period. Government forces, backed by direct military involvement by Saudi Arabia, begin a counteroffensive to retake the gains made by the STC.
- 9 January – the STC dissolves and Aidarus al-Zoubaidi flees Yemen.
- 11 February – A crowd linked to the Southern Transitional Council attempts to storm a local government building in Ataq, Yemen. Security forces open fire, killing five people and wounding 39 more.
