= Popular Resistance Committees (Yemen) =

Anti Houthi Militas

The Popular Resistance (Arabic: المقاومة الشعبية Al-Muqawamat ash-Sha'abiyah), also known as Popular Resistance Committees, are armed groups that have been established in several Yemeni provinces during the Yemeni Civil War, after the Houthi takeover in Yemen. They fight alongside the Yemeni army loyal to president Abd Rabbuh Mansur Hadi, and the Popular committees. They are currently fighting against the Houthi fighters, and forces loyal to former president, Ali Abdullah Saleh. In some provinces, they have united with the Popular Committees to fight against AQAP.

== Fighters ==
As of April 10, 2015, reports state that the popular resistance was formed by ordinary people to defend their homes against the Houthis during the Battle of Aden. After their creation, the resistance has played a major role during several battles, such as the Battle of Taiz and the Abyan campaign (March–August 2015).

== See also ==
- Ali Abdullah Saleh
- Abdrabbuh Mansur Hadi
- Aidarus al-Zoubaidi
- Popular Committees (Yemen)
- Southern Movement
- South Yemen Insurgency
