= Beir Ahmed =

Prison in Aden, Yemen

Beir Ahmed is a prison in Aden, Yemen. In June 2018, The Associated Press reported sexual abuse and torture occurring in the prison.

== Operation ==
The staff of Beir Ahmed are primarily Yemeni, however according to The Associated Press, military officers in the prison are from the United Arab Emirates as well as American personnel in uniforms. Security is provided by the Security Belt, a UAE supported Yemeni paramilitary force of the Southern Movement.

On July 3, 2018 forty-six detainees were released from the prison.

== Abuse ==
According to reporting by The Associated Press, detainees at Beir Ahmed have been subjected to torture and sexual abuse. The Associated Press also reported that detainees have been raped, had their genitals electrocuted, and had rocks hung from their testicles and were held without being charged.

In July 2018, Yemeni Interior Minister Ahmed al-Maysari demanded that the UAE close or surrender control of the prison after The Associated Press released a report of torture and sexual abuse. The UAE's permanent mission to the United Nations stated “The UAE has never managed or run prisons or secret detention centers in Yemen”. A Pentagon spokesman said the U.S. has seen no evidence of detainee abuse in Yemen. Judge Sabah al-Alwani led an investigative committee into the reported torture of detainees at Beir Ahmed Prison from 2018-2019. Her report concluded the detainees were not tortured.
