= National Security Forces =

Military wing of the Yemeni Southern Transitional Council

Security Belt Forces
- قوات الحزام الأمني
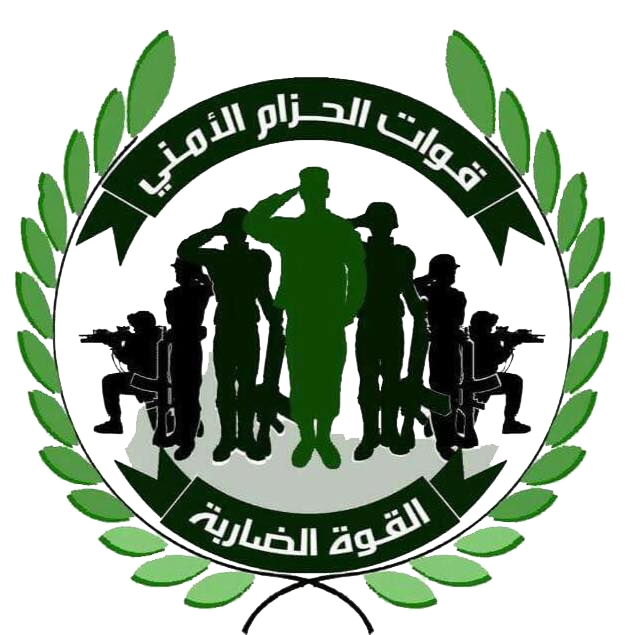
- Security Belt Forces insignia
- Leader: Aidarus al-Zoubaidi
- Dates active: 2016–2026
- Ideology: Separatism
- Size: 13,000
- Part of: Southern Transitional Council
- Wars: the Yemeni Civil War (2014–present)

The Security Belt Forces (Arabic: قوات الحزام الأمني) was a paramilitary force based in Southern Yemen that formed the elite military wing of the Southern Transitional Council. The force operated in the governorates of Aden, Lahij and Abyan, trained and heavily supported by the United Arab Emirates Armed Forces. The Security Belt fought against Islah, al-Qaeda in the Arabian Peninsula and the Islamic State of Iraq and the Levant’s Yemeni branch.

In the Battle of Aden (2018), Mount Hadid, which was under control of troops led by Major General Aidarus al-Zoubaidi, came under attack by pro-Hadi government forces. The Security Belt consolidated its force in Aden and established the city as its central command. According to The Associated Press, Security Belt forces provided security for Beir Ahmed prison in Aden, which has reportedly been the site of extensive torture and human rights violations.

== See also ==
- Popular Resistance Committees (Yemen)
- Southern Movement
- South Yemen Insurgency
