= Zubayd =

- Area
- Country: Yemen
- Governorate: Dhale Governorate
- District: Dhale District

Zubayd (Arabic: زبيد) is a village in Dhale District in Dhale Governorate, located southeast of the city of Dhale.

== Population subdivisions ==
The Zubayd area consists of eight population subdivisions: Al-Qafla, Al-Marsaba, Al-Aghwal, Al-Kurb, Al-Hajar, Al-Najd, Al-Aslaf, Al-Zind, and Al-Haql.

== Geography ==
The Zubayd area is bordered to the east by Naqil Al-Rabd and the areas of Al-Silah, to the southwest by al-Azariq District, and to the north by Dhale city. The area is generally mountainous and is characterized by small agricultural lands and village settlements.

== Population ==
The population of Zubayd depends on agriculture and livestock raising, and the population subdivisions form centers of traditional social life in the area.

== Notable people ==
- Aydarus al-Zubaydi
