= Battle of Sanaa =

Battle of Sanaa may refer to:

- Battle of Sanaa (2011), urban fighting between protesters and the Saleh administration
- Battle of Sanaa (2014), the decisive victory of Houthi rebels over the Hadi administration
- Battle of Sanaa (2017), the decisive victory of Houthis over pro-Saleh fighters

== See also ==
- Battle of Aden (disambiguation)
