= Sabah al-Alwani =

Yemeni judge, the first woman in the Supreme Judicial Council

- صباح أحمد صالح العلواني

Member of the Supreme Judicial Council of Yemen
- Incumbent
- Assumed office 2022

Personal details
- Citizenship: Yemen
- Occupation: Judge

Sabah Ahmed Saleh al-Alwani (Arabic: صباح أحمد صالح العلواني) is a Yemeni judge who, in 2022, became the first woman appointed to the Supreme Judicial Council of Yemen, the country's highest judicial authority. Her appointment has been described as a significant milestone in the advancement of women within Yemen’s judiciary.

== Career ==
Al-Alwani has worked in Yemen’s public prosecution system since 1991, in a series of roles. She was eventually named a Senior Advocate General. In 2013, she was elected head of the Executive Office of the Southern Judges Club. She was later appointed to Yemen’s National Commission to Investigate Alleged Violations of Human Rights.

She led an investigative committee examining allegations of detainee abuse at Beir Ahmed Prison between 2018 and 2019.

=== Online defamation ===
In 2024, al-Alwani was the subject of an online defamation campaign.
