= Munir Al Yafi =

Yemeni support forces commander

Brig. Gen. Abu Al-Yamamah Munir Mahmoud Ahmed Mashali Al Yafi (1974 in Yafa'a District, Lahij Governorate, Yemen – 1 August 2019) was a Yemeni support forces commander. He was the leader of the Southern Movement's military arm during the Yemeni Civil War until his death. He was assassinated on 1 August 2019 alongside 35 other people, during a drone and ballistic missile attack on a military parade in Aden, Yemen carried out by the Houthis.
