= Southern Resistance =

Militant organization in Yemen

- المقاومة الجنوبية
- Logo of the Southern Resistance
- Leader: Muhammad al-Malishi Former: Aydarus al-Zubaydi (2014—2018)
- Spokesperson: Ali Shaif Al-Hariri
- Founded: 2009
- Dates active: 2014 — present
- Country: Yemen
- Groups: General Union of Southern Arabian Tribes; Support and Reinforcement Brigades
- Active regions: Dhale Governorate; Lahej Governorate
- Ideology: South Yemeni separatism
- Conflicts: Yemeni civil war (2014–present); South Yemen insurgency; Battle of Aden (2015); Al-Hudaydah offensive; 2026 Yemen offensives

The Southern Resistance (Arabic: المقاومة الجنوبية) is a Yemeni militant organization that advocates for the creation of a separate state of "South Arabia" based on the former British Protectorate and Federation of South Arabia in the present-day southern and eastern governorates of Yemen while also using the symbols of South Yemen. The military command of the group is led by Muhammad al-Malishi.

== History ==
The term "Southern Resistance" was used in 2009 to refer to factions of the Southern Movement.

The Southern Resistance ambushed a Yemeni army vehicle on January 28, 2014, killing two soldiers; two members of the group died following the clash.

The forces of the Southern Resistance participated in the Battle of Aden, fighting against the Houthis.

Aidarus al-Zoubaidi, leader of the Southern Resistance in 2018 and the Southern Transitional Council, stated that the Al-Hudaydah offensive will not stop until the capture of al-Hudaydah.

On 7 September 2024, the Southern Resistance repelled an attack by the Houthis in al-Musaymir, Lahej Governorate.

On 9 September 2026, the Southern Resistance ambushed figures and personnel from the Presidential Leadership Council in Dhale. On 10 September, Ali Shaif Al-Hariri, spokesperson for the group, stated that the group's prime objective are the Houthis, with some members condemning what occurred. The General Union of Southern Arabian Tribes declared its full support for the Southern Resistance's actions in Dhale against the Presidential Leadership Council, and called upon a mobilization of men and equipment to support their efforts against the Houthis. On 18 September, the Southern Resistance claimed that, with the alleged assistance of tribesmen from the Subeihi region, the group had successfully repelled a Houthi offensive in al-Sudair-al-Dakhula.
