= Southern Transitional Council =

Political organisation in Yemen

South Arabian Transitional Council
- المجلس الانتقالي الجنوبي العربي (Arabic)
- Chairman: Aydarus al-Zubaydi (AWOL)
- Vice president: Hani bin Burayk; Faraj Salmin Al-Bahsani
- Founded: 11 May 2017
- Dissolved: 9 January 2026 (de jure)
- Split from: Southern Movement
- Group: Southern Armed Forces
- Headquarters: Aden, Yemen (until 2026)
- Ideology: Separatism; Secularism; Anti-Islamism
- Part of: Presidential Leadership Council (2022–2026)
- Wars: Yemeni civil war (2014–present); Southern Transitional Council conflict; Battle of Aden (2018); 2019 Southern Yemen clashes; 2022 Southern Yemen offensive; 2025–2026 Southern Yemen campaign; Fall of Aden
- Website: en.stcaden.com

The Southern Transitional Council (STC), (Note: Arabic: المجلس الانتقالي الجنوبي, romanized: al-Majlis al-Intiqālī al-Janūbī) also known as the South Arabian Transitional Council, (Note: Arabic: المجلس الانتقالي الجنوبي العربي) is a Yemeni separatist political organization that formed in 2017 and it operated as a paramilitary force that held territory in southern Yemen until January 2026. Formed as a faction of the Southern Movement, it called for the secession of a proposed federal "State of South Arabia" from the rest of the nation along the borders of former South Yemen, with the name being inspired from the British-created Federation of South Arabia. The organization was backed by the United Arab Emirates.

The council was led by the former governor of Aden Governorate, Aydarus al-Zubaydi, as chairman, with former minister of state and militant Salafi Islamist, Hani bin Burayk, as vice president. The formation of the council was authorized a week earlier by the "Historic Declaration", announced at a rally protesting the dismissal of al-Zubaydi from his post as governor. The STC, a major party to the Yemeni civil war, once controlled all of the territories of the former South Yemeni state. The 26 members of the STC included the governors of five southern governorates and two government ministers.

In April 2022, the STC joined the Presidential Leadership Council, after then-Yemeni president Abdrabbuh Mansur Hadi resigned and transferred presidential powers to the newly formed body. STC head Aydaurs al-Zubaydi became the vice president of the new government. The STC increased its influence in the council by enlarging its membership to three out of the eight, through internal reorganization in May 2023.

In December 2025, the group launched a major offensive to retake the territory of former South Yemen. This was initially widely successful, with the STC capturing almost the entire territory of the former southern state. However, this prompted a PLC-HTA counter-offensive with direct Saudi military support. This turned the tables on the STC and in early January 2026, the council had lost most of its territory, including its capital Aden.

A dispute over the group's fate arose, as an STC delegation in Riyadh announced the group would dissolve, while the group's official spokesperson and other high-ranking officials stated that the Riyadh statement was "null and void", had been made under duress and the STC remained "fully legitimate and operational". Since the loss of territory and its removal from the PLC, the group re-branded as the Transitional Council of South Arabia and continues to stage protests. Although weakened, the STC retains local popular support and military capability, and is currently deploying in defense of Aden in response to the ongoing Houthi advance.

== History ==
In 1914, following the Anglo-Ottoman Convention of 1913, the United Kingdom and Ottoman Empire divided Arabian Peninsula into two parts: the northwest under Ottoman control and influence, and the southeast under British control and influence. The UK established the Aden Colony in 1937 and a Federation of the Emirates of South Arabia in 1959 which evolved into the Federation of South Arabia in 1963. Following an armed rebellion, British forces withdrew from southern Yemen in November 1967, resulting in the independence of the People's Republic of Southern Yemen which later became the People's Democratic Republic of Yemen in 1970. The People's Democratic Republic of Yemen and neighbouring Yemen Arab Republic merged in May 1990 as the Republic of Yemen. Southern separatists proclaimed a Democratic Republic of Yemen in May 1994, however the attempted secession was defeated in July that year.

=== Formation ===
On 27 April 2017, President Hadi dismissed Aydarus al-Zubaydi from his post as governor of Aden Governorate due to his close ties with the United Arab Emirates, which President Hadi described as "acting like occupiers" in Aden. This was met with large demonstrations in the city in support of the deposed but popular Zubaydi.

In 4 May 2017, Aydarus al-Zubaydi announced a speech which the STC describes as the "Aden Historic Declaration". The speech was delivered in Aden's Freedom Square, formerly known as Exhibition Square, in Khormaksar district.

With the help and support of the United Arab Emirates, the STC was formed on 11 May 2017 with al-Zubaydi as its leader. Immediately, President Hadi called the council illegitimate.

=== Capture of Aden ===
Beginning on 28 January 2018, forces loyal to the STC seized control of the Yemeni government headquarters in Aden in a coup d'état against the Hadi government.

In January 2018, as the head of the STC, Aydarus al-Zubaydi announced a state of emergency in Aden and that "the STC has begun the process of overthrowing Hadi's rule over the South".

On 27 August 2019, tensions continued to escalate in southern Yemen after the UAE-backed Security Belt Forces (SBF) lost territories to troops loyal to the Saudi-backed government of President Hadi. The troops advanced on the capital Aden and instead of engaging in street fighting, took positions outside of the city in order to prevent civilian casualties. On 29 August 2019, to stop government forces from advancing and reclaiming the capital, the UAE carried out airstrikes on government positions outside of Aden, which killed and injured over 300 government soldiers.

Despite membership in the coalition fighting the Iran-aligned Houthi rebels, the UAE fell out with Hadi's government after the former accused Hadi of aligning with the powerful Islah party, which the UAE viewed as ideologically close to the Muslim Brotherhood.

=== Post-Riyadh Agreement ===
On 5 November 2019, the STC and the Yemeni government signed the Riyadh Agreement, which resulted in the latter recognizing the former's legitimacy and allowing them into the government, in exchange for the STC withdrawing militarily from Aden and giving up some security control in the south of the country. It followed the Southern Yemen clashes of August 2019, with the goal of ending the fighting and establishing a united front against the Houthi rebels.

The STC declared self-governance on 26 April 2020. The government said local and security authorities in the Governorates of Hadramaut, Abyan, Shabwa, Al-Mahrah, and the island of Socotra dismissed the move as a "clear and definite coup". In Aden, the movement's attempt was successful, as it occupied all governmental institutions.

To deal with the infighting between the Yemeni government and the Southern Transitional Council, a new cabinet was formed with the backing of neighbouring Saudi Arabia. The formation of the new unity government in December 2020, which includes equal numbers of representatives from each region of Yemen's northern and southern areas, was the result of over a year's worth of intense negotiations mediated by the Saudis, and was meant to end the infighting so that the two sides could fight together against the Houthi rebels in the ongoing civil war.

In April 2022, STC formally became part of the Presidential Leadership Council, the new governing body of the Republic of Yemen established after the resignation of the former president. STC head Aydarus al-Zubaydi became the new Vice President. During the STC congress held between 4–8 May 2023, the "Southern National Pact" was adopted, demanding the incorporation of the Southern Movement in the Yemeni peace process under an "independent framework". Houthi insurgents vehemently denounced the congress and its resolutions. Nevertheless, STC managed to increase its share in the Presidential Leadership Council to three members out of the total eight seats.

In August 2022, the STC launched an offensive in the Abyan and Shabwah Governorates, capturing most districts of those provinces.

On 25 September 2025, the STC called for a "two-state solution" to the Yemeni civil war. STC president Aydarus al-Zubaydi said that such an agreement would be the best path towards peace and stability, as he believed there was "no prospect" of dislodging the Houthis from Northern Yemen and that the country was already effectively divided into two states.

=== December 2025 offensive ===
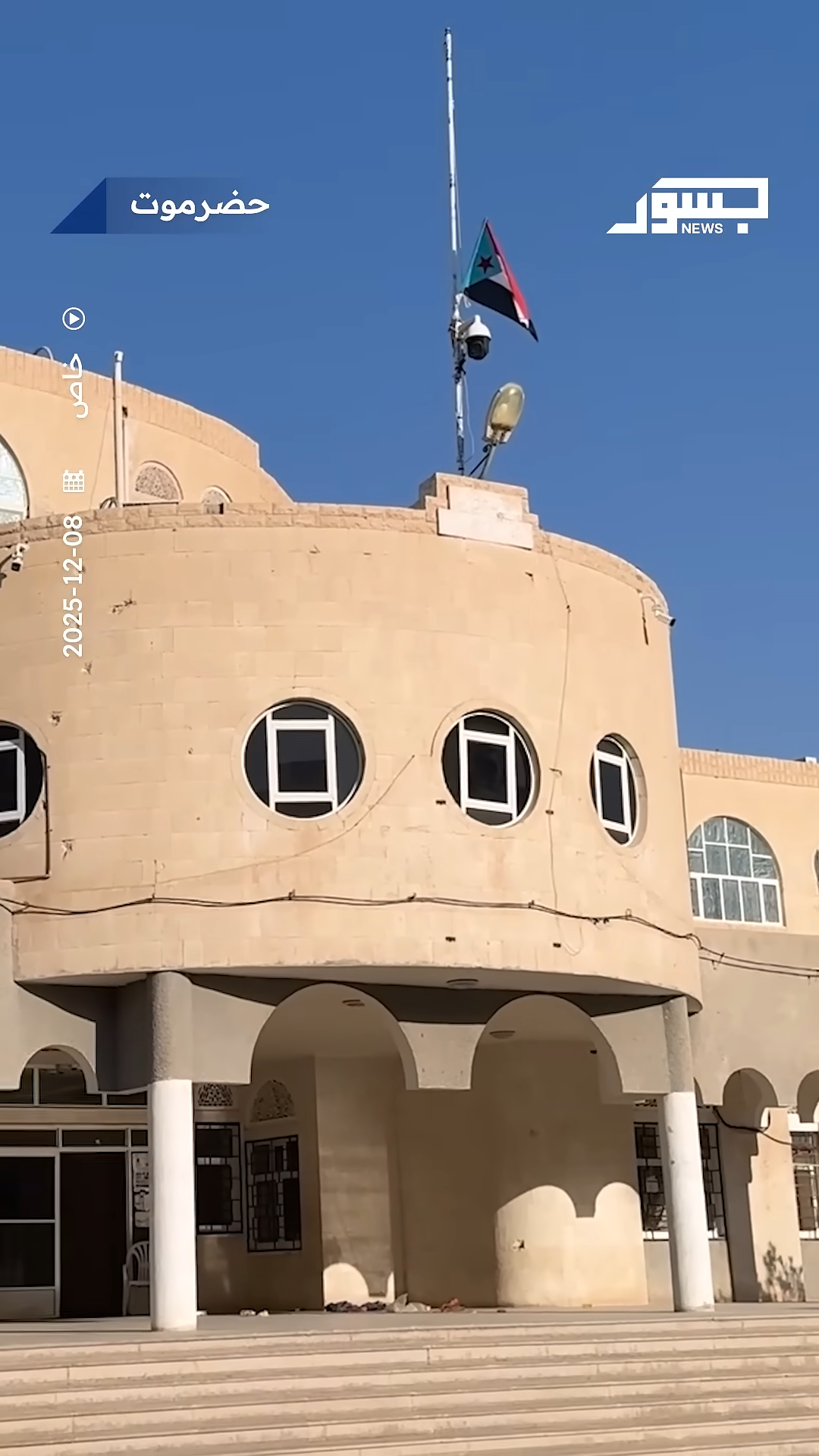
The flag of South Yemen raised atop a government building in Seiyun in December 2025.

On 2 December 2025, the STC launched an offensive across southern Yemen, codenamed "Operation Promising Future", and by 8 December, had captured most of the territory comprising the six governorates of the former South Yemen. The STC declared its intention to continue advancing until it captures the Houthi-held capital of Sanaa. In the immediate aftermath of the offensive, Presidential Leadership Council chair Rashad al-Alimi and prime minister Salem Saleh bin Braik left Aden for Riyadh, Saudi Arabia.

Following the offensive, rallies and sit-ins were held in Aden and other cities demanding the re-establishment of an independent state in South Yemen. By 21 December several ministers in the Yemeni cabinet had issued statements supporting southern independence and al-Zubaydi had declared that the "next stage will be the stage of building institutions of the future state of South Arabia". In response the chair of Yemen's Presidential Leadership Council, Rashad al-Alimi, stated that these ministers had "exceeded their functional responsibilities" and ordered legal action against "violations undermining state authority".

==== January 2026 constitutional declaration ====
On 2 January 2026, the STC published a constitutional declaration for the State of South Arabia, conterminous with the borders of the People's Democratic Republic of Yemen, which had existed as an independent sovereign United Nations member state between 1967 and 1990. al-Zubaydi stated that the constitution would be in effect for two years, after which a referendum on "exercising the right to self-determination for the people of the South" would be held. al-Zubaydi also called for dialogue between the relevant parties in northern and southern Yemen regarding the "paths and mechanisms that guarantee the right of the people of the south." Nevertheless, al-Zubaydi stated that the constitutional declaration could take effect immediately if the call for dialogue is ignored or if STC forces come under military attack.

=== January 2026 PLC counteroffensive and official dissolution ===
Saudi-backed forces loyal to the Presidential Leadership Council launched a counteroffensive in early January 2026. PLC forces took back control of Hadhramaut and Al-Mahrah Governorates between 2 and 4 January 2026. Following Saudi air strikes, pro-PLC forces pushed the STC out of Abyan and Shabwah between 6 and 7 January 2026. al-Zubaydi left Aden on 7 January, initially to Berbera, Somaliland, and then onwards to the UAE.

On 9 January 2026, members and affiliated bodies of the Southern Transitional Council announced that they had decided to dissolve the council. Members of the group said in a statement that they did not participate in the decision regarding the offensive in Hadhramaut and Al-Mahrah, adding that this operation "harmed the southern cause" and that the council has not "achieved its intended aims." Consequently, al-Zubaydi fled to the UAE. However, the UAE-based official spokesman of the STC, Anwar al-Tamimi, called the news "ridiculous" and rejected the announcement. The spokesperson, backed by other high-ranking officials who had fled to the UAE, denied that the STC had disbanded and stated that the Riyadh statement had been made under duress and demanded that the delegation be released from Riyadh. Members of the group who fled to the UAE published a statement on the following day claiming that the dissolution announcement had been made under pressure and that the STC remained "fully legitimate and operational". The STC called for mass protests in Aden in support of the group. Saudi-backed forces announced a ban on demonstrations, but this was ignored by several thousand STC supporters who gathered in the streets in support of the council.

=== Post-dissolution ===
Since the loss of territory and its removal from the PLC, the group re-branded as the Transitional Council of South Arabia and continues to stage protests.

== Territorial control ==
Territorial control during most of the Yemeni civil war before the 2025–2026 Southern Yemen offensive (STC in yellow)

Maximum territorial control achieved during the offensive (STC in yellow)

The STC claimed all the territory of the former South Yemen as part of its proposed State of South Arabia. This is located at the southwestern corner of the Arabian Peninsula and includes the islands of Socotra in Arabian Sea and Perim in the Strait of Mandeb.

After the 2018 Battle of Aden, the group took over parts of Lahij and Dhale Governorates. After 2019 Southern Yemen clashes, the STC controlled territory in Aden Governorate, and in parts of Abyan, Lahij and Shabwah Governorates. On 2020, STC took over Socotra Governorate. From 2022 Southern Yemen offensive, the STC controlled most remaining parts of Abyan and Shabwah Governorates.

As a result of the 2025 Southern Yemen offensive which began on 2 December 2025, the STC gained control Hadhramawt and Al-Mahrah Governorates, thus controlling most of the territory of the former South Yemen. Following a counteroffensive by PLC forces in early January 2026, the STC lost most of the territorial gains they had made during the December 2025 offensive.

== Administration ==
=== Presidential Commission ===
An STC Presidential Commission was announced in May 2017 and as of May 2023 has 26 members with Aydarus al-Zubaydi serving as president and Hani Bin Breik as vice-president.

In 2017 the membership of the Presidential Commission was as follows:

Name	Position or profession
Aydarus al-Zubaydi	President
Hani bin Breik	Vice-president
Fadhl al-Ghadi	Governor for Dhale
Lutfi Bashareef	Minister for Communications
Murad al-Hallemy	Minister for Transport
Hamid Lamlas	Governor for Shabwah
Nasser al-Khobbaki	Governor for Lahij
Ahmed bin Breik	Governor for Hadramout
Saleh al-Awlaqi	Parliamentarian
Abdulhadi Shayif	Economist
Abdullah Arefarar	Representative for Socotra
Abdurrab al-Naqeep	Representative for Yafa'a
Adnan al-Kaaf	Member of Parliament for Aden
Ahmed al-Socotry	Governor for Socotra
Mona Basharaheed	Professor of Literature
Aqel al-Attas	Activist
Lutfi Shatara	Journalist
Sahair Ali	Professor of Law
Ahmed Bamuallem	Brigadier General and representative for Hadramaut
Abdurahman Shaikh	Member of Parliament for Aden
Salem al-Awlaqi	Activist
Ameen Saleh	Activist
Nasser Assadi	Brigadier General
Ali Ashaibah	Brigadier General
Niran Suqi	Jurist
Ali al-Kathiri	Representative of the Southern Movement

=== National Assembly ===
The National Assembly, established in December 2017, was a deliberative body consisting of 303 members representing the districts and governorates of southern Yemen, it was chaired by member of the STC's presidency Ali Al-Kathiri.

== Foreign relations ==
=== Statements by officials ===
In December 2023, In an English-language tweet, al-Zubaydi said that the STC's naval forces could serve a "crucial role" in "protecting international shipping lanes" and "the economic security of the international community", and the Southern Transitional Council reportedly said that it was willing to cooperate with Israel to fight against the Houthi ship attacks. An unnamed official close to Al-Zubaydi said STC "was concerned with confronting Houthi terrorism and getting international support, including from Israel". In September 2025, Zubaydi said in an interview that if the STC were to achieve an independent state, it would likely grant recognition to Israel by joining the Abraham Accords. He stated that "If Gaza and Palestine regain their rights, the Accords will be essential for stability in the region." Zubaydi said, "[t]he two-state solution between Israel and Palestine is the cornerstone for restoring the Abraham Accords to their natural form. The Arab South could be part of them if a Palestinian state is recognized alongside Israel."

== Civil rights and human rights ==
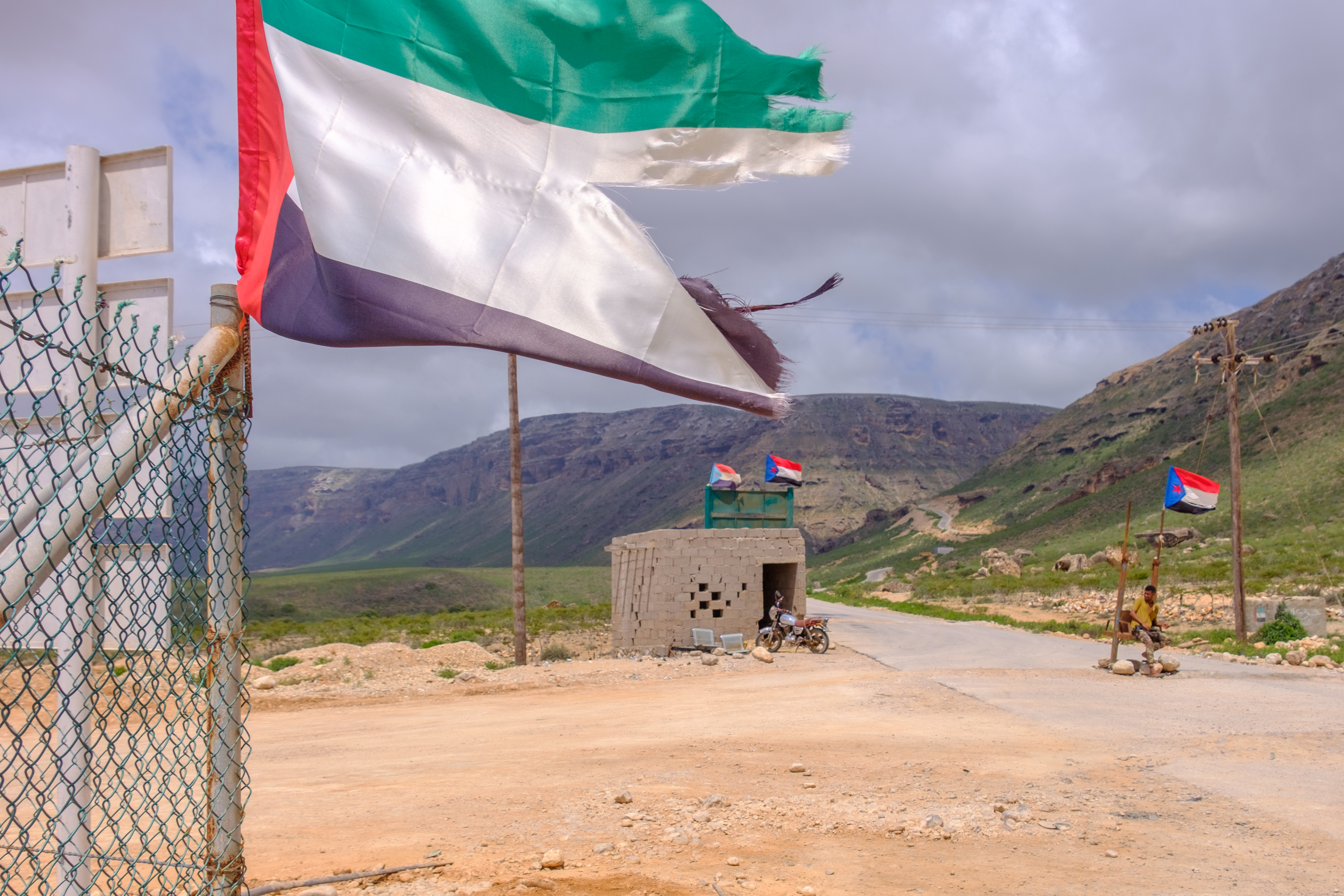
UAE and STC-operated roadblock in Socotra

Amnesty International reported that since 2023, the authorities in Aden have introduced restrictions on civil society organizations, requiring permits from STC-run bodies for public activities. According to Amnesty, these permit requirements often involved extensive reporting obligations and were sometimes used to limit funding or deny approval for organizations perceived as politically opposed to the STC.

In some cases, events organized by non-governmental organizations were prevented from taking place, or were halted after approval had been granted. Venues were reportedly ordered to close events mid-way without explanation. Civil society groups have also reported reduced access to funding and increased self-censorship in response to the restrictions.

Human rights defenders and journalists have been targets of the STC's security forces arbitrary detention. On 16 November 2023, lawyer Sami Yassin Ka'id Marsh was arrested by STC security forces as he was leaving work. He was detained without charge at the al-Nasr military camp, an unofficial facility, held incommunicado, and reportedly subjected to torture and prolonged solitary confinement. In March 2024, he was transferred to Aden's Bir Ahmad prison, where a leaked photograph showed him seriously ill in a hospital bed, raising concerns for his health and wellbeing. Amnesty International reported that he was subjected to torture and prolonged solitary confinement.

On 26 May 2024, armed individuals affiliated with the STC and the Southern Women Union took control of the Yemeni Women Union centre in Aden, a shelter for survivors of gender-based violence. Staff and residents were expelled, and access to the premises was blocked.

== See also ==
- South Yemen insurgency
- Southern Movement
- Yemeni Socialist Party
- Southern Resistance
- Yemen § Etymology
- South Arabia – Historical region in West Asia
