= Shabwah Defence Forces =

Military unit in South Yemen

- قوات دفاع شبوة
- Emblem of the Shabwah Defence Forces
- Leader: Brigadier General Ali Saleh al-Kulaibi
- Dates active: 2017-2026
- Country: Yemen
- Wars: Yemeni civil war (2014-present)
- Website: https://twitter.com/qshbwt?lang=ar

The Shabwah Defence Forces (Arabic: قوات دفاع شبوة, romanized: Qūwāt Difāʻ Shabwah) was a military unit in Southern Yemen that was a part of the secessionist Southern Transitional Council.
