= Aydarus al-Zubaydi =

Yemeni politician (born 1967)

- عيدروس الزبيدي
- Zubaydi in 2024

President of the Southern Transitional Council
- In office 11 May 2017 – 10 January 2026
- Preceded by: Office created
- Succeeded by: Office abolished

Deputy Chairman of the Presidential Leadership Council
- In office 7 April 2022 – 7 January 2026
- Chairman: Rashad al-Alimi
- Preceded by: Ali Mohsen al-Ahmar (as Vice President)

Governor of Aden Governorate
- In office 7 December 2015 – 27 April 2017
- Preceded by: Jaafar Mohammed Saad
- Succeeded by: Abdul Aziz al-Muflehi

Personal details
- Born: Aidarus Qassem Abdulaziz Al-Zubaidi; 1967 (age 58–59) Zubayd, Dhale, South Yemen

Military service
- Allegiance: South Yemen (until 1990); Yemen (1990–1994, 2015–2017, 2022–2026); Democratic Republic of Yemen (1994); Hatham Movement (1996–2002, 2011–2014); Southern Resistance (2014–2017); Southern Transitional Council (2017–2026)
- Branch/service: Popular Resistance Militia; People's Defense Forces (until 1990); Central Security Organization (1990–1994)
- Rank: Major general
- Battles/wars: Yemeni civil war (1994); South Yemen insurgency; Yemeni civil war (2014–present); South Yemen conflict

Aydarus Qassem Abdulaziz al-Zubaydi (Note: Arabic: عيدروس قاسم عبد العزيز الزبيدي, romanized: ʿAydarūs Qāssim ʿAbd al-ʿAzīz az-Zubaydī) (born 1967) is a Yemeni politician who has served as the president of the Southern Transitional Council since 2017. He previously served as the vice president of the Presidential Leadership Council (PLC) from 2022 to 2026 and as the governor of Aden Governorate from 2015 to 2017.

Born in Zubayd, South Yemen, al-Zubaydi served in the South Yemeni Air Force as a second lieutenant from 1988 until 1989. After the unification of Yemen in 1990, he was transferred to Central Security Organization of the Ministry of Interior. Following the outbreak of the Yemeni civil war of 1994, al-Zubaydi fought alongside the breakaway Democratic Republic of Yemen against the northerners. Upon defeat, he fled to Djibouti in 1994, only to return to Yemen in 1996 and lead the Hatham Movement, an insurgent group advocating for South Yemeni separatism.

In 2014, al-Zubaydi announced the establishment of Southern Resistance. He aligned himself with the internationally-recognized government led by President Abdrabbuh Mansour Hadi to fight against the Houthis. Al-Zubaydi's tenure as governor of Aden greatly increased his influence, though his relationship with the central government frayed. Hadi eventually fired al-Zubaydi, which led the latter to form the STC. In 2018, STC captured Aden from the Hadi government. In 2020, under al-Zubaydi's leadership, the STC declared self-rule in southern regions.

In December 2025, the STC launched a large-scale offensive across southern and eastern Yemen, capturing almost half of internationally-recognized Yemen. The STC declared the "state of South Arabia" in January 2026. However, the STC was defeated following a Saudi-led intervention in the same month, after which al-Zubaydi fled into exile in the United Arab Emirates via Somaliland.

== Biography ==
=== Early life and career ===
Aydarus al-Zubaydi was born on 23 July 1967 in Zubayd, a village in the mountains of Dhale Governorate in South Yemen. His family belongs to the Himyar tribe. In Zubayd, he received primary and secondary education before joining the South Yemen military. He moved to Aden where studied at the air force academy, graduating in 1988 with the rank of second lieutenant. He served as an officer in the Air Defense Forces from then on until late 1989. After the unification of Yemen in 1990, he was transferred to the Central Security Organization of the Ministry of Interior, in which he served as chief of staff for a diplomatic protection battalion in the capital of Sanaa, before later serving in the special forces.

During the Yemeni civil war of 1994, Zubaydi sided with the breakaway Democratic Republic of Yemen and fought alongside secessionist forces against the northerners. Upon the defeat of the southerners, he fled to Djibouti in July 1994. He returned to Yemen in 1996 and founded the Hatham Movement, an insurgent group based in Dhale which advocated for the self-determination of the south. From 1997 to 1998, the group waged an assassination campaign against northern military officials, for which he was tried in absentia and sentenced to death.

The death sentence imposed in Zubaydi was pardoned by President Ali Abdullah Saleh in 2000. From thereon, he entered the political sphere of Yemen through working with the Joint Meeting Parties, and by 2002 the Hatham Movement had become inactive. The group was revived by Zubaydi in 2011 amidst the Yemeni revolution, during which it claimed responsibility for several attacks on the Yemeni military forces in Dhale. Clashes with his forces in the south were again reported in 2013. In early 2014, Zubaydi announced the establishment of the Southern Resistance, a militant group aligned with the Southern Movement. His statement pledged to continue armed resistance against the Yemeni government until the achievement of an autonomous southern state.

=== Yemeni civil war and Aden governorship ===
Upon the outbreak of the Yemeni civil war, Zubaydi aligned himself with the internationally-recognized government led by President Abdrabbuh Mansour Hadi to fight against the Houthis. His Southern Resistance praised the commencement of Operation Decisive Storm by the Saudi Arabia-led coalition in March 2015. Al-Zubaydi led his forces in the face of a Houthi offensive in Dhale, forcing their complete withdrawal from the governorate by 25 May, the first in the south to be liberated from Houthi presence. His forces later advanced upon the al-Anad Air Base in Lahij, and participated in the Battle of Aden alongside coalition and government units. On 4 August, he declared all areas in the south as liberated from the Houthis.

Acknowledging his leverage in the south, Hadi issued a presidential decree appointing Zubaydi as the governor of Aden on 7 December 2015. He succeeded Jaafar Saad, who was assassinated in a car bombing claimed by the Islamic State – Yemen Province (IS–YP). Zubaydi came into office during a time of extensive instability in Aden, with groups such as IS–YP and al-Qaeda in the Arabian Peninsula (AQAP) occupying territory in multiple districts. Four assassination attempts against him were claimed by IS–YP during his tenure, three of which were car bombs. In response, Zubaydi ordered a large-scale operation in early March 2016 to liberate all areas in Aden from the militant groups, which was successfully completed later in the month. Adam Baron of the European Council on Foreign Relations described these operations as only "tenuous progress", with Aden remaining rife with armed factions by the end of the year.

As Zubaydi's tenure continued, his influence increased greatly in the region, but his relationship with the central government frayed. He and his security director, Shalal Ali Shaye, acted largely autonomously from the government's authority, cooperating with foreign actors such as the United Arab Emirates at their own will while refusing to do so sometimes with the northerner-dominated Hadi administration. On 10 September 2016, he publicly proposed the establishment of an independent political and security body in the south, and expressed hope for recognition from the government and Saudi-led coalition.

=== Southern Transitional Council ===
He was fired on 27 April 2017 by President Hadi. On 3 May, major rallies were held in Aden to protest the decision of Hadi.

One week later, the Southern Transitional Council (STC) was formed; some of the members were the governors of Dhale Governorate, Shabwah Governorate, Hadramaut Governorate, Lahij Governorate, Socotra, and Al Mahrah Governorate. Al-Zubaydi became a member of the Southern Movement and President of the Southern Transitional Council.

On 29 January 2018, in the Battle of Aden, al-Zubaydi announced a state of emergency in Aden and that "the STC has begun the process of overthrowing Hadi's rule over the South". In April 2020, the STC announced self-rule in southern Yemen.

On 7 January 2026, Rashad al-Alimi announced that al-Zubaydi was dismissed from the Presidential Leadership Council. He stated that al-Zubaydi had committed treason and ordered an investigation. Simultaneously, al-Zubaydi was reported to have been absent from peace negotiations in Riyadh concerning the Yemeni civil war. The PLC accused al-Zubaydi of fleeing instead to Dhale Governorate with a "large number" of STC forces, although the STC said al-Zubaydi was still in Aden. The Saudi-led coalition in Yemen later said that al-Zubaydi travelled to Berbera, Somaliland by boat and boarded a plane before he flew to Abu Dhabi via Mogadishu, Somalia.
