= Yemeni civil war (1994) =

- Part of the effects of the Cold War
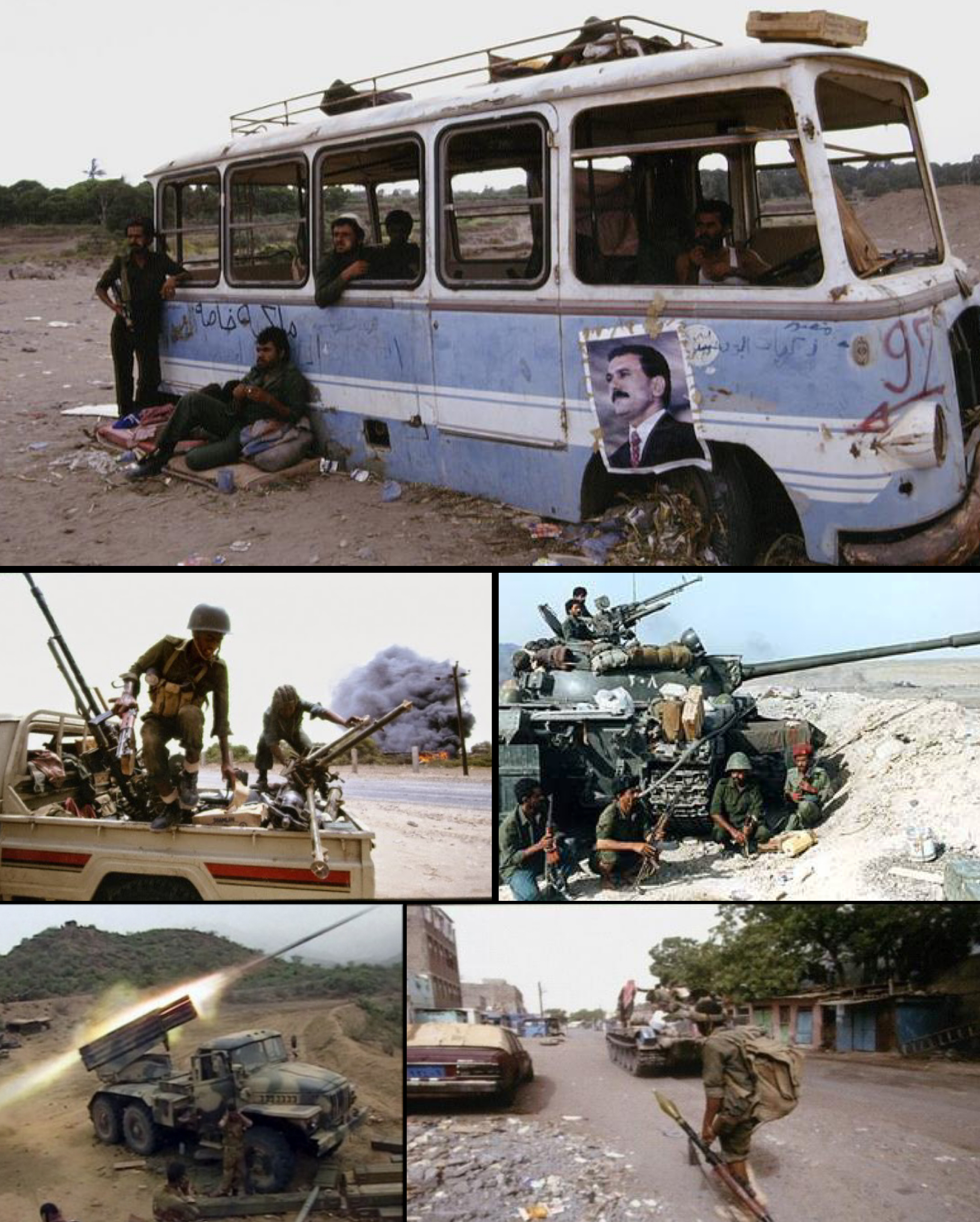
- Clockwise from top: Northern Yemeni soldiers next to an abandoned bus with Ali Abdullah Saleh's portrait; Southern separatist soldiers taking cover behind a T-55 tank; Northern forces fighting in Aden city; Northern forces' BM-21 Grad multiple rocket launcher shelling separatist positions; Northern soldiers in a Toyota Land Cruiser technical.
Date	4 May – 7 July 1994 (2 months and 3 days)
Location	Yemen
Result	Unionist victory (Note: See the § Aftermath section)

Belligerents
Yemen; Islamic Jihad in Yemen; Yemeni Socialist Party (al-Zomrah faction)	Democratic Republic of Yemen (from 21 May 1994): Yemeni Socialist Party

Commanders and leaders
Ali Abdullah Saleh; Ali Mohsen al-Ahmar; Abdrabbuh Mansour Hadi; Tariq al-Fadhli	Ali Salem al-Beidh (surrendered); Ali Mohammed Assadi (surrendered)

Casualties and losses
931 soldiers and civilians killed 5,000 wounded (N. Yemen claim)	6,000 fighters and 513 civilians killed
- 600 destroyed tanks 7,000–10,000 dead and 500,000 displaced Unknown number of South Yemeni civilians executed

The Yemeni civil war (Arabic: الحرب الأهلية اليمنية), also known as the Summer War of 1994 (Arabic: حرب صيف ١٩٩٤), was a civil war fought between the two Yemeni forces of the pro-union northern and the socialist separatist southern Yemeni states and their supporters. The war resulted in the defeat of the southern separatists and the reunification of Yemen, and the flight into exile of many leaders of the Yemeni Socialist Party (YSP) and other separatists.

== Background ==
In December 1989, the presidents of the Yemen Arab Republic (North Yemen; YAR) and the People's Democratic Republic of Yemen (South Yemen; PDRY) signed a draft constitution. They agreed to a one-year timetable for unification.

Approval for the union was overwhelming in the South, but the northern Islamist party Al-Islah objected due to the new constitutional clause making Islamic law "a principal source of legislation" rather than the sole source. Eventually the YAR's parliament approved the constitution and the Republic of Yemen was declared on 22 May 1990 with Ali Abdullah Saleh becoming president and Ali Salem al-Beidh Vice President. Greater Yemen, whose land has been divided between the British and the Ottoman empires in the mid-19th century, had been united for the first time in more than 150 years.

A new ruling coalition was formed in which the General People's Congress and the Socialist Party joined the Islah Party, and a member of the Islah Party was included in the Presidential Council (conflicts within the ruling coalition began very quickly). Yemen held its first parliamentary elections on April 27, 1993, which confirmed the southerner fears. Former President of South Yemen, Ali Salem Al-Beidh's party (YSP) won only 54 of the 301 parliament seats, while former president of Northern Yemen Ali Abdullah Saleh's GPC took 122 seats and a northern Islamist-tribal alliance, Al-Islah, captured 62 seats. Saleh, Beidh, and Attas retained their positions but Al-Islah's influential leader, the Sheikh Abdullah ibn Husayn al-Ahmar of the Hashid tribal confederation, became speaker of the parliament. The former 50–50 split between the GPC and YSP became an uneven three-way partnership.

Relations between Saleh and many left-wing politicians soured over the following years. The President eventually began to enlist Islamists to weaken his opponents, and allowed them to build up a presence in the country. Jihadists consequently assassinated several Southern communists.

As a new oil field was brought online in the Hadhramaut Governorate in the south, southerners began to feel that their land, home to the majority of the country's oil reserves, was illegally appropriated as part of a planned conspiracy by the rulers of North Yemen.

Finally, the newly unified nation faced political crisis when an estimated 800,000 Yemeni nationals and overseas workers were sent home by Saudi Arabia following Yemen's decision not to support Coalition forces in the Gulf War. Remittances from these workers, an important part of the economy, were slashed and many Yemenis were placed in refugee camps while the government decided where to house them and how to re-integrate them into the workforce. The repatriation of these Yemenis immediately increased the nation's population by 7%.

Vice President Ali Salem al-Beidh withdrew to Aden in August 1993 and said he would not return to the government until his grievances were addressed. These included northern violence against his Yemeni Socialist Party, as well as the economic marginalization of the south. Negotiations to end the political deadlock dragged on into 1994. The government of Prime Minister Haidar Abu Bakr al-Attas, the former South Yemen Prime Minister, became ineffective due to political infighting.

An accord between northern and southern leaders was signed in Amman, Jordan on 20 February 1994, but this could not stop the crisis. The overall security situation in the country deteriorated, with accusations from southern leaders that there have been numerous killings targeting southerners and that northern leaders are working to gradually marginalize them and seize all power. During these tensions, both the northern and southern armies–which had never integrated–gathered on their respective frontiers.

== Political conflict ==
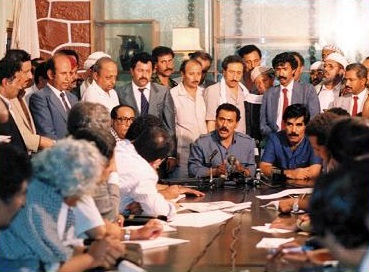
Saleh and Beidh in 1989.

Protests broke out in the south as a result of political conflicts and the deterioration of the security situation in the country, with the widespread violence, political terrorism and assassinations, as well as the deterioration of the political and economic situation in the country, with southerners expressing their dissatisfaction through marches, demonstrations, rallies and conferences that began on October 9, 1991 and lasted until May 12, 1992.

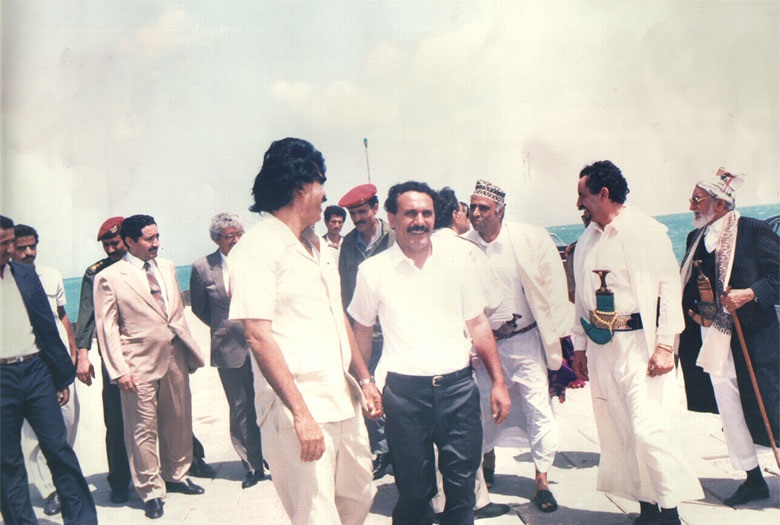
Saleh and Beidh in 1990.

As a result of the crisis that arose between the two ruling parties since December 31, 1991 in connection with the elections and many other issues, such as the integration of the two armies, the failure to implement the Law on Political Parties requiring non-intervention by the military, the need to resign the Prime Minister and the ministers who had put forward their candidacies, the idea of holding a national conference was proposed, as well as a formula for dialogue on the issues and problems of Yemen in the midst of the process of democratic transformation and national unification. The main purpose of holding such a conference was to formulate a political document that all parties would adhere to, whether those that would come to power as a result of the elections or those that would leave it.

As the end of the transition period approached and preparations were made for the parliamentary elections that took place on 27 April 1993, demands from parties outside the ruling coalition for a National Conference became increasingly important. In response, a preparatory committee for the conference was formed, headed by Abdul Rahman Al-Jifri, the head of the Yemeni League of Sons party. When this committee was formed, it was taken into account that it should include representatives of various parties and major political organizations in order to ensure their contribution to the work of the conference. The committee managed to overcome many problems that prevented the convening of the conference. However, the two ruling parties indicated that both sides continued to be unwilling to hold the conference. They even supported the idea of holding a parallel conference, which was decided to be held in mid-August 1992, but disagreements postponed it until mid-September.

The National Conference finally took place and began its work on September 12, 1992, at the Cultural Center in Sana'a, in the presence of representatives of parties, political and social forces, a number of Islamic scholars and members of the House of Representatives, while the Socialist Party was absent, despite its participation in the work of the committee for three months, thus declaring its solidarity with its partner in government, the Congress, which did not participate in the preparation of the National Conference and preferred to participate in the preparation of the Conference of Parties and Mass Organizations, which was to take place simultaneously with the National Conference.

On 11 May 1993, after the elections, the two parties (the GPC and the YSP) agreed to merge into one political party that would gain an absolute majority in the elected House of Representatives. A statement they released stated that President Saleh and Vice President Al-Beidh signed an agreement to unite the two parties on 10 May 1993. Both parties stated that their merger would begin with the formation of a single bloc in parliament and the establishment of close and strong coordination between them, which would lead to the creation of a single political organization. On 23 May, President Saleh tasked Haidar Abu Bakr al-Attas with forming a new government, but this stalled due to disagreements between the Socialist Party and the Islah Party. On 30 May 1993, after the disagreements were resolved, the formation of a tripartite coalition government was announced.

On October 11, 1993, the Yemeni House of Representatives elected a new presidential council for the country consisting of five members, including President Saleh, his deputy al-Beidh, Islah Party member Sheikh Abdul Majid al-Zindani, General People's Congress Party assistant secretary general Abdul Aziz Abdul Ghani, and Salem Socialist Party assistant secretary general Saleh Mohammed.

However, the Vice President of the Presidential Council, Ali Salem Al-Beidh, said he would not come to Sana'a to take the constitutional oath and would remain in his residence in Aden. Al-Beidh justified his refusal to attend the meeting, saying, “Sanaa is an arsenal of weapons, and continuing this situation means that we will remain tied up and fighting among ourselves.” He stressed that he “does not want to go to Sanaa to take the oath and lie to the people again, and said he cannot bear responsibility in light of the current conditions, which have not allowed and will not allow him to do anything since the first day of unity.” On October 29, Al-Bayd warned that Yemen’s unity “is at risk unless we establish its state and give it national and democratic content.” Al-Baydh blamed "those in whose hands the apparatus of power is obstructing the adoption of measures" and added that he would have taken the constitutional oath "if he had seen the opportunity to set a timetable (for the 18 points he put forward) for practical measures."

On the same day, Al-Beidh's sons (Naif, 24, and Nayouf, 22) and their cousin (Kamel Abdel Hamid, 23) were shot in the Mansoura District in Aden. Kamel was immediately dead, with more than thirty bullets in his head and the body. A source in the Socialist Party confirmed that there were "political motives" behind the attack, which he considered "a message addressed to Al-Beidh, due to the firmness of his position" in the dispute with President Saleh over the political and economic reform program.

On November 10-11, Saleh informed his deputy Al-Beidh that all points of disagreement were open to discussion, provided that unity was not lost. Yemen's Saba news agency reported that the president ordered the removal of checkpoints set up by the army, and the Yemeni parliament asked Saleh to prevent the military from moving from one place to another "to calm the situation."

=== Escalation and military activity ===
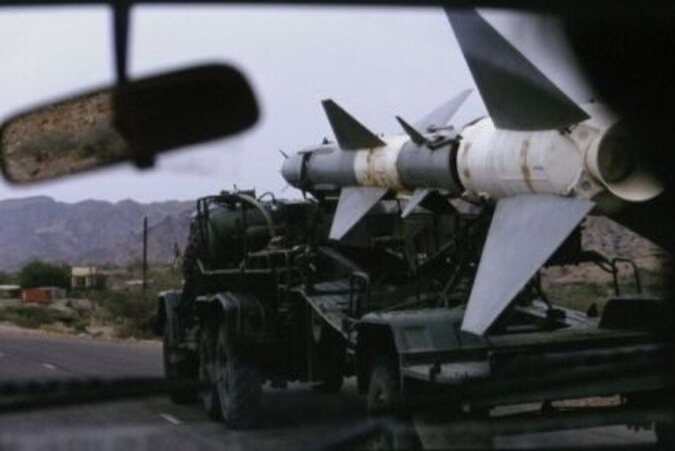
SAM system of the Yemeni government forces moving into position.

Yemen witnessed military movements: the Southern Forces, stationed near the city of Amran, moved to the south of the country, while thousands of Northern Forces soldiers were stationed in Taiz, Ibb and on the Aden-Sana'a road, and military reinforcements were sent from both sides to Qa'atabah, which was the crossing point between the northern and southern parts of the country. On 17 November 1993, Southern military units moved from the south towards the north, arriving from Salah al-Din Camp and Al-Anada Air Base to reinforce Southern units in the "fringe" areas, i.e. the dividing line between the two halves of the reunified country, in part taking up defensive positions in the hills surrounding the port of Aden, in anticipation of a possible attack by Northern forces. On 10 December, the Socialist Party accused the GPC of placing the former Northern forces on high alert and re-establishing border security between the two halves, and denied a report that its own leaders had ordered the Southern forces to prepare. This came a day after the Socialist Party welcomed Yemeni President Saleh's adoption of his reform programme.

By January of 1994, efforts of the Military Committee, formed to integrate and unite the two armies, had failed to reach an agreement under the pressure of conditions set by the southerners (for example, they demand for the disbandment of the Republican Guard, loyal to President Saleh, numbering tens of thousands of soldiers and equipped with the best weapons). Meanwhile, popular demonstrations were held in the main Yemeni cities of Sana'a, Taiz and Hadramaut to protest the rise in prices following a 12% fall in the national currency in a week. Due to the tense situation, most shops in the main cities were closed.

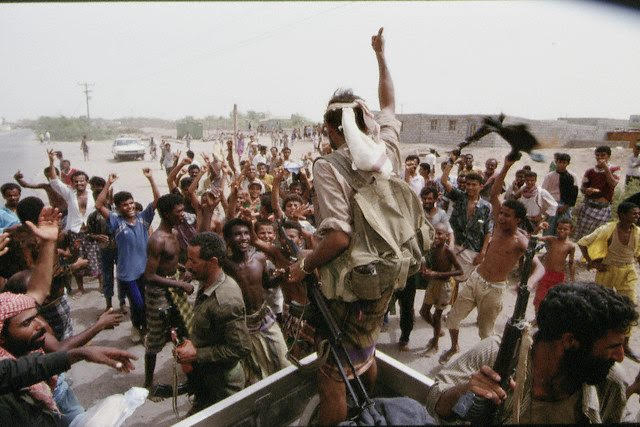
Yemeni armed tribesmen, 1994.

On January 10, gunmen opened fire on the al-Beidh house in Aden. The incident did not cause any injuries or casualties, but it led to an escalation of the political crisis in Yemen, with the GPC warning on January 13 of the possibility of civil war if mediation efforts were unsuccessful. Diplomatic sources in London confirmed that the military actions of the two sides in the crisis are no longer just a show of force, but have become a reality, as evidenced by foreign reports and eyewitness accounts. While Sana'a ordered the Northern "Giants Brigade" to retreat from the southern part of Abyan Governorate to the north, the Southern forces have deployed to the mountain heights in the northern part of Al Bayda governorate. The Socialist Party, in a statement from its political bureau, said that its forces are ready to defend Aden in the face of the so-called "million-man march" that the GPC party has decided to launch towards the former South. According to the Socialist Party, the Northern government redeployed its forces around Hodeida and Sana'a ("especially the Second Thunderbolt Brigade") and later moved them towards Taiz, Marib and Ibb, and also transported huge quantities of weapons from secret ports in Hadramaut and Shabwa and distributed them among local loyalists. The South confirmed the deployment of its forces in the southern province of Abyan and the northern province of Al-Bayda to counter the "Giant Brigade" movement.

== Pre-war clashes ==
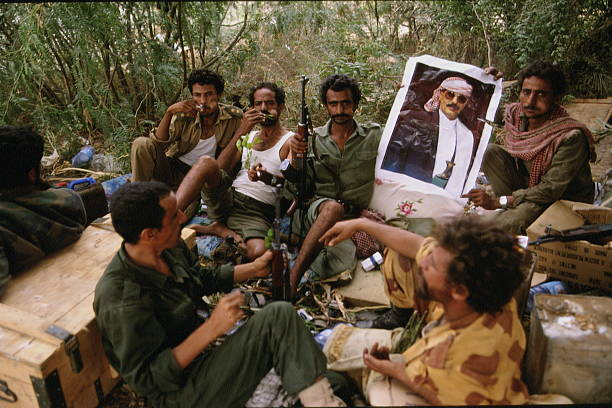
Yemeni government army soldiers hold a portrait of president Saleh.

An accord between northern and southern leaders was signed in Amman, Jordan on 20 February 1994, but this could not stop the crisis: less than 24 hours after the signing of this document, limited military clashes involving tank forces took place in Abyan province. After two days of events, the situation had calmed down somewhat, but signs of military movements and reinforcement continued, and the intensity of military clashes increased, leading to the clashes spreading to the southern part of Lahij province and then moving to the northern part. On February 27, a statement from the Yemeni Defense Ministry in Aden confirmed the killing of 12 soldiers and the wounding of about 3 soldiers in an attack by Northern Army units on a Southern Army brigade stationed in the north. The statement said the attack escalated into a fierce battle, and that armored units of the 1st Northern Armored Division, supported by armed elements from the Hashid tribes, attacked the 5th Southern Infantry Brigade with heavy artillery in Harf Sufyan, 50 kilometers north of Sana'a. This battle marked the beginning of the elimination of Southern forces stationed in the north.

According to Radio Sana'a (which quoted a spokesman for the GPC), the southerners sent a number of artillery pieces, armored vehicles, armored personnel carriers, and military crews to the Al-Awail and Al-Sha'ab areas in the Al-Dali district, the Sha'ab Al-Hank and Jahaf areas, and distributed more than three thousand weapons to members of their militias in Al-Awail and Al-Sha'ab. Despite a growing popular movement in major cities opposing the spread of armed violence, by March 8, the Northern and Southern forces had consolidated their positions in different parts of Yemen, expecting more clashes. Units from the two armies were deployed in the Amran and Marib regions, north and east of Sana'a. On 27 April, a major tank battle erupted in Amran, near Sana'a. Both sides accused the other of starting it. In short, there were a lot of other skirmishes between the two armies in the same week the agreement was signed in Amman and again in early spring: even before the war officially began, by the last days of April and early May, it was estimated that more than 150 tanks and 22 other armored vehicles had been lost, 200 people had been killed and 250-300 had been wounded, and about 159 houses had been damaged in border clashes.

== War ==
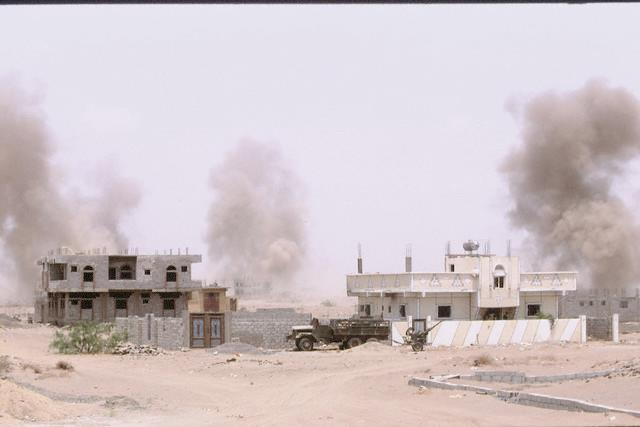
Smoke from artillery shelling.

Full-scale war broke out on 4 May, when the Southern Air Force bombed Sana'a, Hodeida and Taiz; the Northern Air Force responded by bombing Aden, al-Anad military airport, al-Haswa power plant, oil refineries, radio and television stations in Aden. President Saleh declared a 30-day state of emergency, and foreign nationals began evacuating the country, the Aden's government in Aden has declared full mobilization. The capital Sana'a was empty of civilians, all shops were closed, and anti-aircraft artillery continued to fire heavily to protect the capital's airspace. Telephone communications within the country were cut off, especially with the south. The next day Saleh’s northern forces crossed the demarcation line in pursuit of the southern army heading for Aden: the main targets of the advancing Northern forces were the roads leading to Aden, which were defended by the Southern forces. The Northern Military Command announced that it had shot down five southern fighter jets, including two in the al-Raha area, two in Mukairas and one in al-Raheed, on the former border between the two parts of Yemen, while the Southern Command said it had shot down four northern jets. Vice President al-Beidh was officially dismissed. South Yemen also fired Scud missiles into San'a, killing dozens of civilians. Prime Minister Haidar Abu Bakr al-Attas was dismissed on May 10 after appealing for outside forces to help end the war. On May 10, a Southern source said Southern forces had repelled a new offensive by Northern forces towards Aden, marking the ninth attempt by northerners to cross the old border between the two parts of Yemen. The separatist government said the fighting was concentrated in the border areas of al-Dhale, Karish and Mukairas, and accused Sudan of sending troops to fight on the Northern side (which Sudan denied).

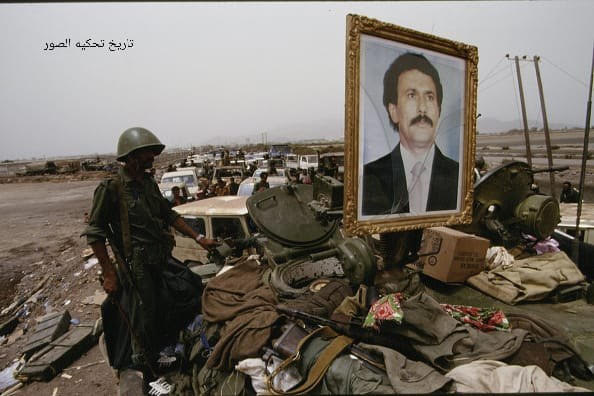
Northern army soldier with portrait of president Saleh.

On May 12, Northern Forces captured the town of Dhale, and state television showed footage of their tanks and armoured vehicles roaming the streets of the unnamed town, it was recognized by Southern government 3 days later. Since May 16, the war has assumed more dangerous proportions at both the military and political levels. At the military level, the situation has been marked by very important military changes, represented by the opening of a new front by the Northerners in the Shabwah governorate, the resumption of the activation of the Abyan front and the escalation of hostilities around the strategically important southern airbase of Al-Anad. In the new phase of the fighting, the Northern Command adopted a different tactics of attack: it used mass wave attacks, using conscript units, less trained and less capable of combat, while keeping the main striking forces, such as the Republican Guard brigades, to move to the front at the right time. In response to the new tactics, the Southern Command used the method of intensive aerial bombardment and relied on the movement of armor between different points to achieve a firepower proportional to the density of the northern waves, which clearly gave an advantage due to the knowledge of the nature of the terrain on which the fighting took place.

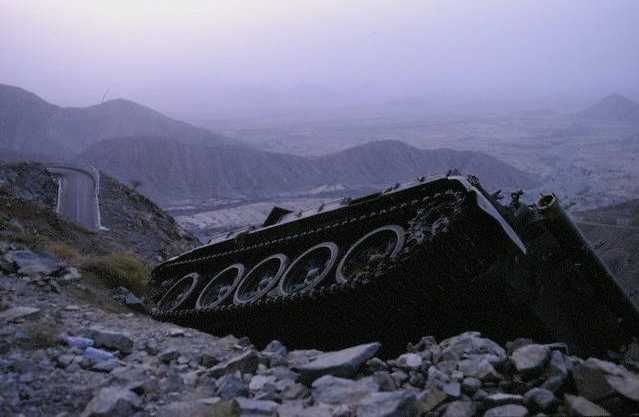
Stuck and abandoned T-55 tank.

On 20 May 1994, northern forces claimed to have overrun Al Anad Air Base, one of the key entry points to Aden. Later that day, President Saleh announced a three-day ceasefire for the occasion of the Eid al-Adha Muslim holiday. However, journalists visiting the front reported that Northern and Southern forces were engaged in intense close-quarters fighting around the base, with artillery shells and rockets pounding it while Southern forces appeared to be shooting and fighting to dislodge the Northerners. North Yemeni officers confirmed that some southern forces were still in the area, estimating their numbers at around 10,000 soldiers. The Southern government has stepped up its mobilization, calling up thousands more young men to the front lines and roaming the streets of Aden in preparation for defense. Northern Command announced that its forces were now 30 kilometers from Aden.

Southern leader al-Beidh seceded and declared the Democratic Republic of Yemen (DRY) on night of 21 May 1994. Secession was greeted with celebratory shots fired into the sky by Southern forces defending the capital, Aden. Saleh responded by calling on Islamists to support his cause, with several factions coming to the aid of the North, and put forward the slogan "unity or death." No international government recognized the DRY.

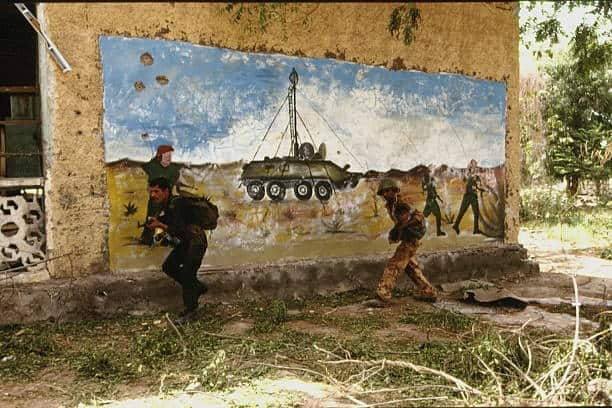
Soldiers attacking.

Following the arrival of reinforcements from Sana'a, large-scale fighting resumed on 23 May, and the Northern Forces were able to advance into Shabwa Governorate, cutting the road between Aden in the west and Hadramaut in the east. The Southern Command, for its part, confirmed that the northerners' advance was the result of their retreat, and due to the Northern Forces' numerical superiority. The next day, fighting intensified on various fronts, and the defense minister in Sana'a warned air and sea companies against using southern airports and ports.

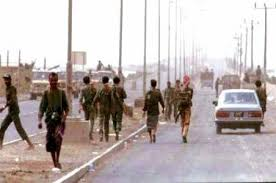
Soldiers from the North in fight.

Northern forces began to advance toward Aden and Hadramaut, and southern resistance weakened. The key city of Ataq, which allowed access to the country's oil fields, was seized on May 24: the Southern forces were in almost constant retreat. After northern forces took control of the Al-Anad base and advanced on other fronts, they began to exert direct military pressure on Aden from three fronts: Abyan in the east, Lahj in the north and Bab el-Mandeb in the west. By this time, the Northern Command had assembled a strike force in the Shabwa and Hadramaut directions consisting of at least six brigades, represented by the Shalal Brigade, the Sixth Brigade and the Third Brigade, in addition to the forces of the Unity Brigade, the Eighth Giants Brigade and some other giants forces, as well as the Republican Guard. In fact, the Northern Command sought to strengthen its political position during this period by exerting military pressure on various fronts to influence efforts for a political settlement, as it intensified attacks on all fronts surrounding the city of Aden to besiege it. Northern forces also continued heavy and concentrated bombing of strategic targets in Aden, especially the airbase at Aden Airport. However, the southern forces managed to inflict heavy casualties on the attacking northern forces, forcing them to retreat. At June 1st, the United Nations Security Council adopted Resolution 924, calling for an end to the fighting and a cease-fire: the Northern Command failed to establish full control over Aden before the resolution was passed. The UN Secretary-General also appointed a special representative and tasked him with a fact-finding mission to Yemen. A cease-fire was called on 6 June, but lasted only six hours; concurrent talks to end the fighting in Cairo collapsed as well. The Northern Command tried to take advantage of the time it had before the arrival of the UN Secretary General's special envoy in the country: with this idea in mind, it increased military pressure on Aden and continued its brutal artillery and aerial bombardment. Northern warplanes began to focus on striking the Aden's oil refinery for the first time since the beginning of the conflict. As a result of this intense pressure - the Northern Forces were able to continue tightening the military "cordon" around Aden and were now 20 kilometers away from it to the north and 30 kilometers to the east. Soon, the Northern Command sent new reinforcements to participate in the Battle of Aden. These forces attempted to advance into Shabwah Governorate, but initially suffered heavy losses. During this period, the intensity and ferocity of the ongoing fighting again increased greatly, and Aden was subjected to continuous and indiscriminate shelling, the heaviest since the beginning of the war.

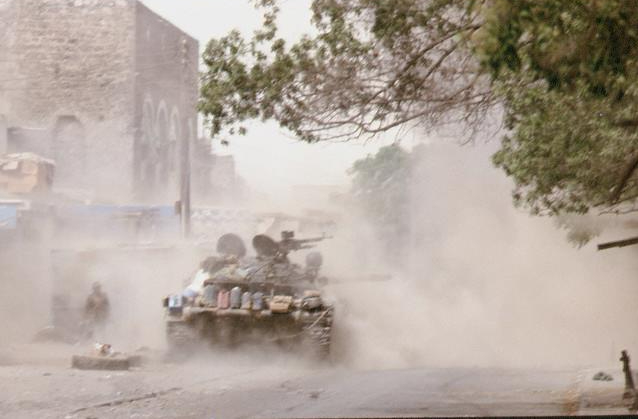
Government army tank fighting in Aden.

The Northern Command used all its firepower and capabilities to achieve rapid victories on various fronts: and indeed, this fierce pressure allowed the Northern Forces to achieve important military successes, so that they managed to establish their absolute control over the Abyan and Lahj, as well as control most of Shabwah Governorate and continue the offensive in Hadramaut Governorate. These days marked the final encirclement of Aden from all sides (except the sea side). Northern troops and Jihadist forces led by Tariq al-Fadhli entered Aden on 4 July, factually ending the conflict. On July 6, the Northern Command announced its readiness to implement the Security Council resolution calling for a ceasefire. However, subsequent developments in the armed conflict showed that this statement was, from the very beginning, a façade to unite the northern forces and give them an opportunity to take advantage of the relative détente in the Southern military efforts and mislead world public opinion. The truce lasted no more than a few hours, after which the fighting for full control over Aden resumed. There were many signs and indications that the Northern Command was determined to establish its full control over all areas of southern Yemen. Supporters of Ali Nasir Muhammad greatly assisted military operations against the secessionists.

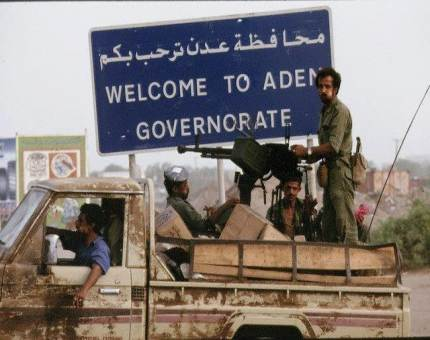
Yemeni government forces entering Aden governorate.

By July 7, the Northern Army captured Aden. After Aden's fall, most resistance quickly collapsed and top southern military and political leaders fled into exile.

Despite the civil war being a short conflict, it was brutal and fought fiercely. Virtually all of the fighting in the civil war occurred in the southern part of the country, despite air and missile attacks from the south against cities and major installations in the north. Southerners sought support from neighbouring states and reportedly received military assistance from Saudi Arabia and Oman, which felt threatened by a united Yemen The United States repeatedly called for a cease-fire and a return to the negotiating table. Various attempts, including by a UN special envoy and Russia, were unsuccessful to effect a cease-fire.

== Aftermath ==
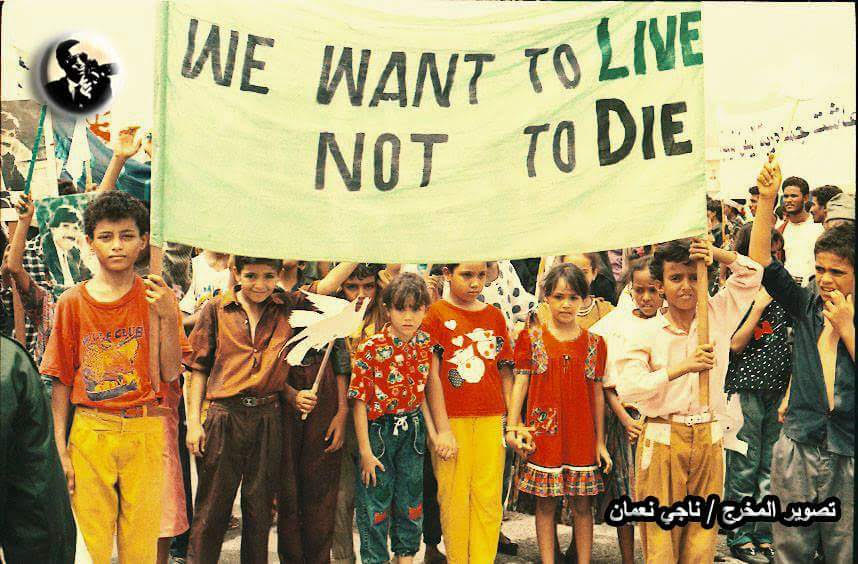
Anti-war children's demonstration in Aden.

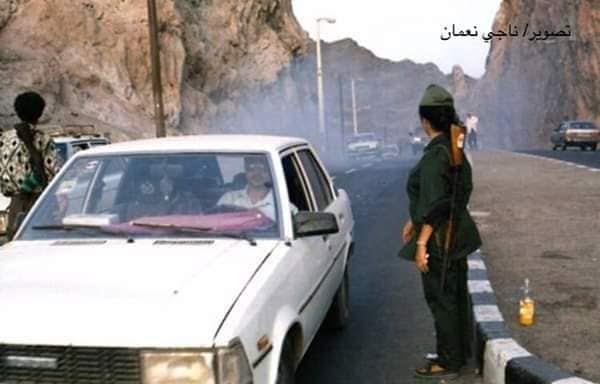
Soldiers on the streets of Aden.

=== Political aftermath ===
President Saleh had gained control over all of Yemen. A general amnesty was declared, except for 16 southern figures; legal cases against four — Ali Salem al-Beidh, Haidar Abu Bakr al-Attas, Abd Al-Rahman Ali Al-Jifri, and Salih Munassar Al-Siyali — were prepared, for misappropriation of official funds. After the war, numerous amendments were made to the constitution agreed upon during unification. The Presidential Council was abolished, the southern quota of members in the House of Representatives was abolished, and the number of southern members was reduced to 56 instead of 111.

YSP leaders within Yemen reorganized following the civil war and elected a new politburo in July 1994. However, much of its influence had been destroyed in the war. President Ali Abdallah Saleh was elected by Parliament on 1 October 1994 to a 5-year term. However, he remained in office until 2012.

After the war, factories in Aden were privatized, their machinery and equipment looted, and their buildings seized. Once the peak of the city’s industrial prowess, the damage to its national economy was severe, leading to the cessation of local production and the dismissal of many workers, still in their prime.

As of 2007, a group called the Southern Movement calling for the secession of the south and the re-establishment of an independent southern state has grown in strength across many parts of south Yemen, leading to an increase in tensions and often violent clashes.

=== Economic aftermath ===
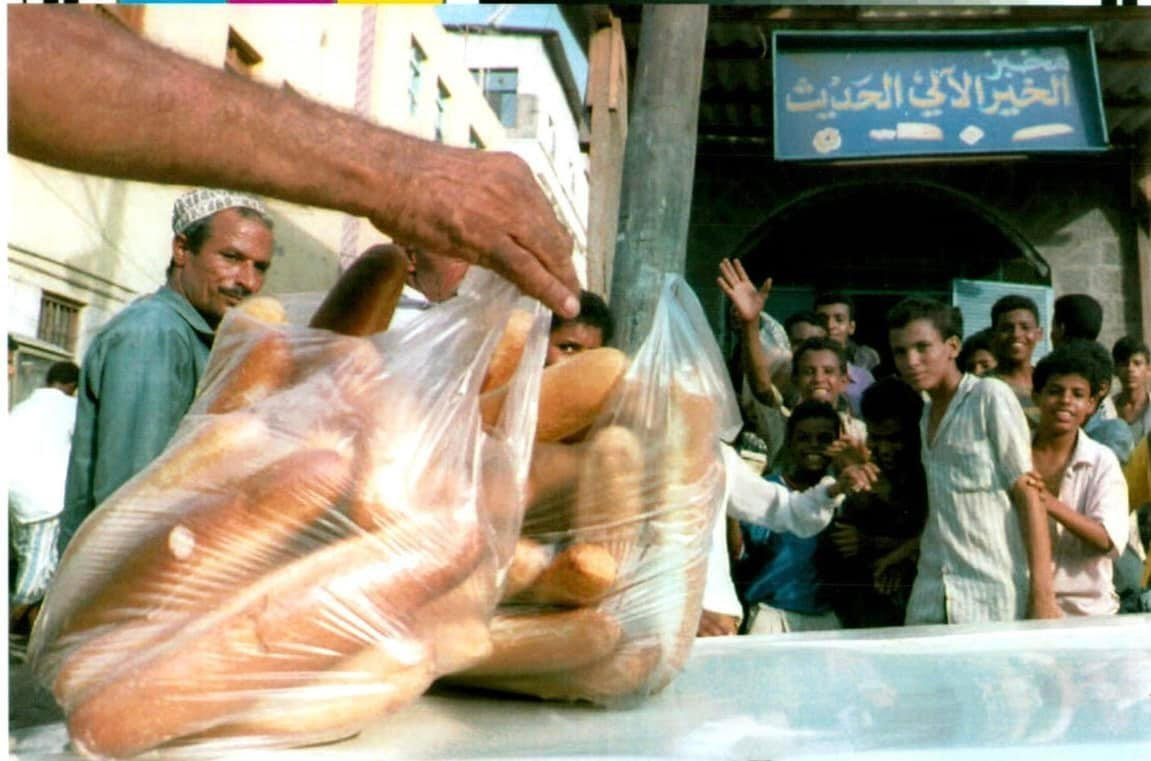
Distribution of bread in Aden during the government blockade.

The political crisis in Yemen exacerbated the deterioration of the Yemeni economy to the point that the government was unable to agree on a state budget for the 1994 fiscal year. According to official figures, the 1993 budget had a deficit of 35.3%, accompanied by a decline in the growth rate of national income and a reduction in the state's foreign exchange earnings (the general budget deficit of the state exceeded 36 billion Yemeni riyals).

The civil war destroyed the state's industrial and commercial facilities, real estate, investment climate, infrastructure, and projects. Inflation soared to 300%, and the value of the Yemeni rial against the dollar fell from 70 rials to the dollar before the fighting began to more than 1,000 riyals to the dollar during the war.

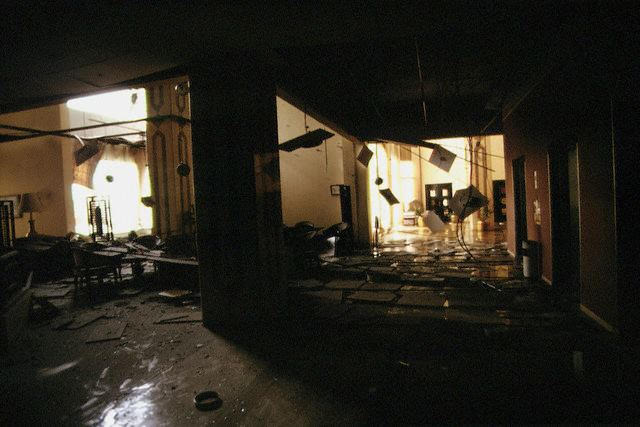
Destruction in Aden.

According to the Yemeni government, direct and indirect losses from the war amounted to approximately 10 billion dollars, which was mainly due to the destruction and severe disruption of administrative and economic facilities, as well as the impact of the fighting on the activities of oil companies - a major export and the backbone of Yemen's economy.

== See also ==
- List of modern conflicts in the Middle East
- Southern Movement
- South Yemen insurgency
