= South Yemen insurgency =

Separatist protests and attacks in Yemen

- Part of the Yemeni crisis and the Yemeni civil war (2014–present)
- Situation in March 2012, showing the area where there was presence of South Yemen resistance
- Date: 27 April 2009 – present
- Location: Southern Yemen
- Goals: Southern Yemeni Independence; Equal representation
- Methods: Protest; Strikes; Attacks on military forces

Parties
| (South Yemen) Southern Movement; Southern Resistance; Success Movement; Council for Leading the Peaceful Revolution; Southern Transitional Council; minor groups; Supported by: United Arab Emirates; AQAP (claimed by AQAP, accused by the government) | Government of Yemen; Yemeni Armed Forces; Yemeni Army; Yemeni Republican Guard; Yemeni Air Force; Yemen Paramilitary; Ministry of Interior; Yemeni Police; Pro-government tribes; Al-Islah militias |

Lead figures
| (South Yemen) Hassan Baoum (POW) (South Yemen) Fawaz Baoum (POW) (South Yemen) Tahir Tamah (South Yemen) Tareq al-Fadhli (South Yemen) Ali Salem al-Beidh (South Yemen) Yasin Said Numan (South Yemen) Ali Saleh al-Yafee † (South Yemen) Ahmed Bamualem (POW) (South Yemen) Ali al-Saadi (POW) (South Yemen) Ali Saif Mohammed (South Yemen) Mohsin al Twairah (South Yemen) Abbas Tanba † | (Yemen) Rashad al-Alimi (since 2022); (Yemen) Abdrabbuh Mansur Hadi (2011–2022); (Yemen) Ahmed Saleh (until 2012); (Yemen) Mohammed Basindawa (2011–2014); (Yemen) Muhammad Nasir Ahmad Ali; (Yemen) Abdullah al-Thuraya † |

Casualties and losses
| 1,800 killed 500+ Detained (over 350 released) | 254 killed 1,900 injured (Government claim) |

The South Yemen insurgency is a series of protests and attacks on government forces in southern Yemen since 27 April 2009. The insurgency comes amid the Shia insurgency in the country's north as led by the Houthi communities. Southern leaders led a brief, unsuccessful secession in 1994 following unification. Many of them are involved in the present secession movement. Southern separatist insurgents are active mainly in the area of former South Yemen, and also in Dhale Governorate which was not a part of the independent southern state.

== Background ==
The modern country of Yemen was split into two countries from 1967 to 1990: the Yemen Arab Republic, or North Yemen, and the People's Democratic Republic of Yemen, or South Yemen. Ali Abdullah Saleh became president of North Yemen in 1978. His government had poor relations with the Zaydis, a branch of Shia Muslims, mainly located in North Yemen and southern Saudi Arabia.

Saleh eventually led the effort to unify North and South Yemen, which happened in 1990; he became president of the new Republic of Yemen. While developing the new country, Saleh found opposition in Sunni Muslims and residents of former South Yemen, who felt that he was changing the country too much in the pursuit of unification. The southerners also felt like they were being given second-class status compared to the north. Saleh would stay in power for decades, forcefully suppressing his opposition. In 1994, a civil war broke out when opposing southerners tried to secede into their own country like before; this was quickly won by Saleh, who kept the country unified.

In 1998, al-Qaeda in Yemen (AQY) a branch of the militant organization al-Qaeda, began an insurgency against Saleh's government in an attempt to control the region, which continues to this day. At the time, al-Qaeda was run by Osama bin Laden in Afghanistan. After al-Qaeda's 11 September attacks in 2001, bin Laden hid in Pakistan, and Ayman al-Zawahiri dealt with much of al-Qaeda's affairs in his stead. In 2009, al-Zawahiri merged AQY and al-Qaeda of Saudi Arabia into al-Qaeda in the Arabian Peninsula (AQAP). It became one of the most powerful al-Qaeda subsidiaries.

In the early 2000s, the Zaydis' opposition to Saleh grew, resulting from his marginalization of the group, and his support of the United States' war on terror and 2003 invasion of Iraq. This led to the founding of the Houthis, a Shi'ite opposition movement and organization. In 2004, Yemen issued an arrest warrant for the movement's founder, Hussein al-Houthi, leading to the Houthis' insurgency against the government. Al-Houthi was killed by government forces, and the Houthi leadership soon passed to his brother, Abdul-Malik. He has been their leader since then. The insurgency continued for years, as the Houthis became enemies of Saudi Arabia. Iran, a historical adversary of the Saudis, began sending financial and military aid to the Houthis around 2009, bringing Yemen into the Iran–Saudi Arabia proxy war.

== Insurgents ==
The political movement behind the insurgency is a group called the Southern Movement. Led by exiled southern Yemeni leaders and opposition figures, this group initially called for peaceful protests. However, their protests turned into riots, some with armed fighters. The insurgency has occasionally been linked by the Yemeni government to Islamist groups, including ex-military commanders and South Yemeni tribes. South Yemen is home to several jihadist movements, some of which are believed to be affiliated with al-Qaeda, most notably a group called the Aden-Abyan Islamic Army. Naser al-Wahishi, the leader of AQAP, expressed support for the South Yemeni separatist movement. However leaders of the Southern Movement were quick to deny any links with al-Qaeda. Many believe that Saleh's government used al-Qaeda as a means to win international support against insurgencies in the North and South. As a response to such accusations, Tariq al-Fadhli—one of the leaders of the Southern Movement—posted a video of himself on YouTube raising the American flag with the national anthem over his compound in an attempt to openly distance himself from al-Qaeda.

There are many leaders within the movement, including Fadi Hassan Ahmed Baoum who is head of the Southern Movement's Supreme Council. He was arrested and later released by Yemeni authorities. Meanwhile, Tahir Tamah has been said to be behind the group's militant faction.

== Insurgency ==
=== 2009 ===
On 28 April, 14 people were injured and one soldier was killed as separatist militants attacked a checkpoint in Mukalla; this was the 7th soldier to be killed in South Yemen secessionist violence.

On 3 May, one man was killed and four were injured in a bomb blast carried out by separatist militia.

On 4 May, armed South Yemeni protesters ambushed a military base in the south, killing one soldier.

On 8 June, two people were killed and four were wounded during protests in the south, bringing total casualties to 11 soldiers and 11 others killed.

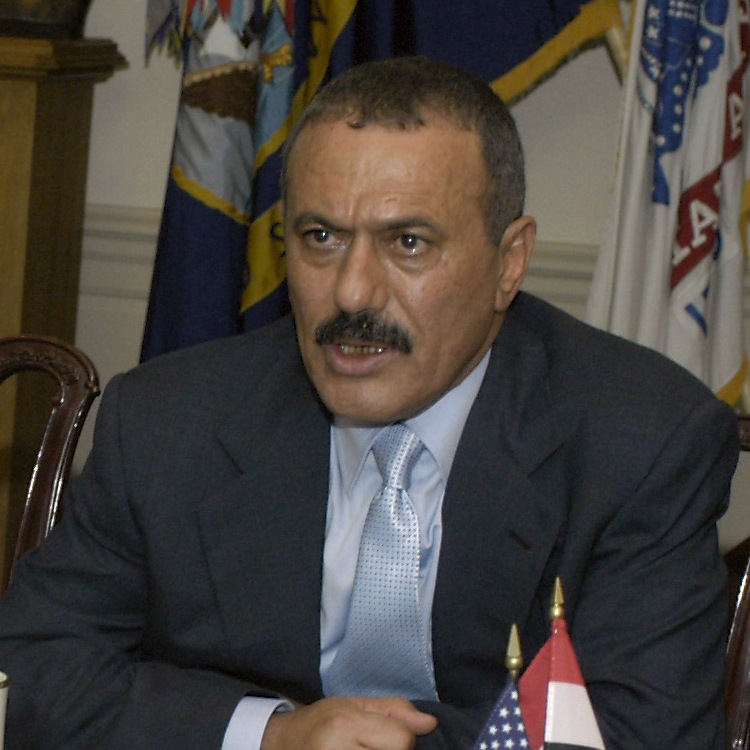
Ali Abdullah Saleh

On 25 July, one person was killed and four were injured as protesters clashed with police in Dhaleh.

On 28 July, four Yemeni soldiers are killed as armed men attack a government checkpoint in the south. It was said supporters of Tareq al-Fadhli, an Islamist leader who called for protests in response for the death of 16 people at a separatist rally, were responsible

On 25 October, gunmen ambushed a vehicle carrying the body of a soldier killed in Saada, the ambush killed two soldiers and injured three.

On 1 November, armed rebels attacked the headquarters of security corps in Abyan Governorate, killing one soldier and kidnapping the Deputy Governor of Abyan, Adel Hamoud al-Sabri.

=== 2010 ===
On 24 January, in Shabwa Governorate, three members of Yemen's security forces were killed after an attack on a checkpoint.

On 25 January, during riots, one policeman was killed while 11 policemen and three schoolchildren were injured.

On 27 January, separatists shoot dead a policeman in Al-Ghaydah.

From 1 to 24 February, the government arrested 130 separatists in South Yemen.

On 13 February, riots in al-Hawta city, Lahij Governorate, left one dead and seven injured. According to Hawta security director Ali Ammar: "Separatist elements blocked the roads, opened fire randomly and hurled a grenade at a security patrol, killing a citizen and injuring others."

On 17 February, Tareq al-Fadhli announced that starting on the 20th, the next phase of the South Yemeni uprising would begin with mass protests and civil disobedience campaign. The man who died was a protester and another five protesters were arrested. However, in a separate clashes armed separatists killed a soldier and wounded three in Shabwa Governorate.

On 20 February, separatists kill the director of a criminal investigations unit and one of his guards in an ambush on a government convoy, another three people were injured. In a separate incident, clashes erupted between security forces and gunmen in Dhale.

On 22 February, Faris al-Dhama, a South Yemeni activist, was arrested and killed by the Yemeni government.

On 23 February, a soldier was killed by armed separatists in Dhale Governorate.

On 26 February, a soldier was killed in an ambush in Abyan Governorate.

On 27 February, Yemen declared a state of emergency in southern Yemen. This followed a rise in attacks against soldiers.

On 1 March, a Southern Yemeni activist accused of links with al-Qaeda, was killed in an armed attack against his home, along with his wife, son, and daughter, as well as two policemen. Another policemen was wounded. Elsewhere, 19 people were killed in a bombing in the city of Ta'izz.

On 11 March, two militants were killed and ten others wounded in clashes with police. Six policemen were also wounded.

On 1 April, an argument between inmates from the separatist Movement for the Independence of Southern Yemen and guards resulted in a bomb being thrown and up to forty inmates escaping in Dhale. Four were reported injured. On 15 April, two militants were wounded during a riot after a demonstration in Dhale city.

On 4 June, a Yemeni colonel and two of his bodyguards were killed in an attack.

On 20 June, two officers were killed in an ambush in Dhale Governorate. On 23 June, three soldiers were killed in fighting in the governorate. On 24 June, three soldiers and a civilian were killed, and eight others wounded in clashes in the governorate.

On 25 June, one Southern Movement separatist was killed by security forces in Aden after a firefight erupted during anti-government protests. On 7 July, two demonstrators died and four were injured when police attempted to break up anti-government protest in Aden.

On 27 July, separatists ambushed a security patrol in Lahij, killing four soldiers and wounding nine others. On 5 September, two people were killed and seven others were injured Sunday in clashes between security forces and militants in Lahij Governorate. On 17 December, clashes killed four Yemeni soldiers and an army officer after soldiers shot dead a Southern Movement member, Abbas Tanbaj, in Habilain in Lahij Governorate. Eight additional people are reported wounded, including five soldiers, two militants, and a civilian.

=== 2011 ===
On 8 January, Southern Movement militants attacked a checkpoint in al Malah district in Lahij Governorate. At last two soldiers were killed and another was injured in the attack. On 10 January, clashes in the governorate killed at last two soldiers. On 12 January, fighting between southern separatists and soldiers in the governorate killed four Yemeni soldiers and wounded ten others.

On 13 January, southern Movement supporters demonstrated in Mukallah in Hadramawt Governorate demanding that detained militants be released. One militant was killed and two others were wounded.

On 16 January, one woman was killed and seven civilians were wounded in Habilain in Lahij Governorate during fighting. The army reported that four of its soldiers were wounded during the clashes.

==== 2011 Yemeni revolution ====
Territory and areas of influence for rebels (blue) and Islamists (red) in Yemen's uprising, as of 23 October 2011.

On 24 February, at least one civilian was killed during a Southern Movement protest in the city of Lawder in Abyan Governorate.

On 28 March, in Shabwa Governorate, the Southern Movement attacked and looted Central Security camps, taking control of Nessab, Al-Saaed, Haban and Maefaa districts of the governorate.

On 4 April, southern separatists stormed military checkpoints in Lahij Governorate. The clashes left one soldier dead and five soldiers wounded.

On 20 April, gunmen attacked security forces at a protest in Khormaksar city in Aden Governorate, killing one soldier and wounding at least four other people. Some witnesses report that the gunmen were connected to the Southern Movement.

On 10 June, suspected Southern Movement militants attacked a military checkpoint outside al Habilain in Lahij Governorate. At least five soldiers and three rebels were killed. On 16 June, gunmen linked with the Southern Movement shot and killed two Yemeni soldiers in Lahij Governorate.

On 24 June, at least three soldiers and a passerby were killed in an attack led by South Yemen militants in Al-Mansoura. A notable southern secessionist, Jeyab al Saadi, was killed when security forces opened fire on the funeral procession in Aden. On 1 July, an armed militant from the Southern Movement was killed in an attack on an army position in Aden. Six others, including three soldiers, were injured in the clash. Southern Movement was blamed for an ambush in Aden on 9 July, against a security patrol killing a Yemeni army officer and two troops. Two civilians were also wounded in the attack.

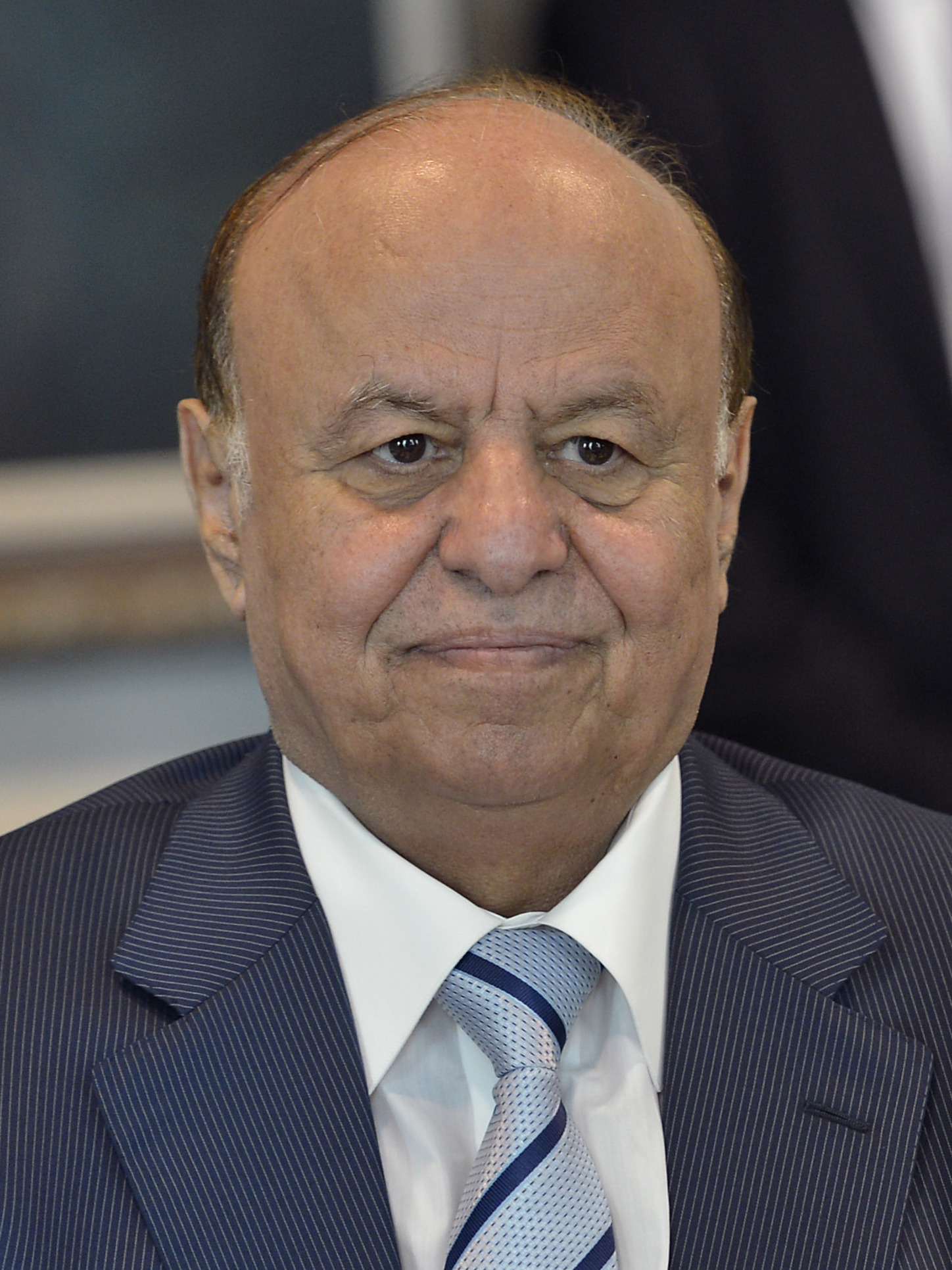
Abdrabbuh Mansour Hadi

On 23 August, armed tribesmen backed by the Southern Movement captured a prison in Lahij. Government forces were unable to counter the heavy fire and surrendered. Over 20 prisoners were freed.

=== 2012 ===
The Southern Movement, like the Houthis, rejected a GCC brokered deal between the GPC and Al-Islah and boycotted the February 21, 2012 presidential election leaving Abdrabbuh Mansour Hadi as only candidate.

=== 2014 ===
On 17 January, clashes between Yemeni troops and secessionist militants killed four people, two of them soldiers. The fighting broke out when the militants ambushed a military vehicle, killing the soldiers and wounding four others, a military source told AFP.

On 30 January, two soldiers were among four people killed when the army clashed with separatists in Dhale. Southern Movement activists ambushed an army vehicle at dawn with automatic fire, killing two soldiers. Also were killed two attackers and seven more wounded in a subsequent firefight. An activist with Southern Movement confirmed the clash, saying the attackers belonged to the militant Southern Resistance group.

On 5 February, unidentified gunmen shot dead four Yemeni soldiers an attack on a military vehicle in Shabwah Governorate. They opened fire as the vehicle headed to an army checkpoint near the port of Balhaf gas-export terminal.

On 7 February, four soldiers killed and many wounded when Yemeni tribesmen ambushed a military convoy accompanying technicians repairmen which were sent to repair an oil pipeline that was blown up by tribal militias in southeastern Hadhramaut Governorate.

On 18 February, Yemen's Ministry of Defense said that nine people were killed in clashes between armed men and Yemeni soldiers in Dhale city. Including four soldiers and one officer were killed in the clashes. Also fourteen other soldiers were kidnapped.

On 9 March, at least two Yemeni soldiers and four militants were killed when fighters tried to attack a military compound in southern Yemen.

On 7 August, military and local officials said that eleven militants and four Yemeni soldiers were killed in attacks on two army posts in southeastern Hadramawt Governorate.

=== After 2017 ===
At the end of April 2017, the Governor of the Aden Governorate, Aidarus al-Zoubaidi, was sacked by Hadi, with the reason of disloyalty to him, and loyalty to the Southern Movement. On 3 May 2017, major rallies were held in Aden to protest the decision of Hadi. One week later, Southern Transitional Council was formed, and some of the members were the governors of Dhale, Shabwah, Hadhramaut, Lahij, Socotra, and Al-Mahrah governorates. It also have partial control in Abyan and Aden Governorates. One day later, Hadi rejected the council, and called it illegitimate.

== See also ==
- Southern Transitional Council conflict
- List of modern conflicts in the Middle East
