= Southern Movement =

Yemeni southern separatist movement and organization

- الحراك الجنوبي
- Logo of the Southern Movement
- Leaders: Ali Salem al-Beidh # Hassan al-Ba'aum; Saleh Ali Bin-Ghaleb; Ahmed Omar Bin Fareed; Abd Al-Rahman Ali Al-Jifri; Saleh Bin Fareed; Shalal Ali Shayih
- Dates active: Since 2007
- Active regions: Yemen
- Ideology: Separatism or self-determination
- Wars: the South Yemen insurgency the Yemeni Civil War, and the Yemeni Revolution

The Southern Movement (Arabic: الحراك الجنوبي, romanized: al-Ḥirāk al-Janūbiyy), colloquially known as al-Hirak (lit. 'the movement'), is a political movement and paramilitary organization active in the south of Yemen since 2007, calling for secession from the Republic of Yemen and a return to the former independent state of South Yemen.

== History ==
=== Background ===
Yemen prior to unification

After the union between South Yemen and North Yemen on May 22, 1990, a civil war broke out in 1994. This came after leaders of the former independent southern state declared an end to the unity deal amidst an alleged power-grabbing usurpation by their northern counterparts. The result was a swift defeat of the weakened southern forces and the expulsion of most of its leaders out of Yemen, including the former Secretary-General of the Yemeni Socialist Party and the Vice-President of unified Yemen, Ali Salem al-Beidh.

=== Post-1994 ===
After the 1994 civil war, calls for southern independence were successfully put down and national unity was maintained. Grievances however remained high amongst many residents of the south. Accusations of corruption, nepotism, and electoral fraud were leveled against the new ruling party based in Sana'a, led by President Ali Abdullah Saleh, as well as a mishandling of the power-sharing arrangement agreed to by both parties in the 1990 unity deal.

Many in the south also felt that their land, home to much of the country's oil reserves and wealth resources, was being exploited after the unity deal. Privately owned land was seized and distributed amongst people affiliated with the Sana'a government. Several hundred thousand military and civil employees from the south were forced into early retirement and compensated with pensions below the subsistence level. Although equally low living standards were prevalent throughout the whole of Yemen, many in the south felt that they were being intentionally targeted and dismissed from important posts, and being replaced with northern officials affiliated with the new government. The city of Aden, the former capital city of South Yemen, also witnessed neglect both socially and economically, whilst new investments appeared to be focussed instead on northern Sana'a, the new capital.

Beyond the economic grievances were also cultural and social ones too. Many in the south long believed their history was distinct from that of their northern neighbours. This became more evident after the 1990 unity. After 128 years of British rule, South Yemen was an independent state for 23 years. Despite the economic difficulty in its later years with the collapse of its main backer the Soviet Union, the socialist state prided itself on its free healthcare, education and welfare system. Many in Aden today speak foreign languages or have technical skills as a result of their state-sponsored education abroad enjoyed in the days of pre-unity South Yemen. Unlike the north, tribalism was looked upon with disdain and generally stamped out of everyday life in the south, which instead preferred the law and order of civil society passed onto them from British rule. Post-1994 unity saw a gradual return of tribalism into southern society. It is not uncommon for residents of the south to even refer to those from the north as being "mutikhalifeen" or backward.

In May 2007, grieving pensioners who had not been paid for years began to organise small demonstrations demanding better rights and an end to the economic and political marginalization of the south. As the protests spread throughout Aden and grew more popular, so too did the demands of those protesting. Eventually, calls were being made once again for the secession of the south and the re-establishment of South Yemen as an independent state. The government's response to these peaceful protests was heavy-handed, labeling them as 'apostates of the state' and using live ammunition to disperse the crowds.

This eventually gave birth to the Southern Movement, which grew to consist of a loose coalition of groups seeking a complete secession from the north. Their presence in the south was restricted, and their actions were limited to the organising of protests and marches across the south which were often met with deadly violence. To raise the former flag of South Yemen was considered a crime in Aden, although a common practice outside of the city where government control was limited.

Multiple protests by the Southern Movement took place between 2007 and 2009, during which 100 were killed.

== See also ==
- Southern Transitional Council
- Security Belt
- Shabwani Elite
- Southern Resistance
