= Outline of the Yemeni crisis, revolution, and civil war (2011–present) =

Yemeni civil war
- Part of the Yemeni crisis, the Iran–Saudi Arabia proxy war, the Red Sea crisis and the Middle Eastern crisis (2023–present)
- Political and military control in Yemen as of 10 September 2026: Republic of Yemen (PLC government; recognized by the UN) Houthi-controlled Yemen Al-Qaeda in the Arabian Peninsula (AQAP; Jayshan district) (For a detailed map of the military situation in Yemen and border areas in Saudi Arabia, see here.)
Date	16 September 2014 – present (11 years, 11 months and 4 weeks)
Location	Yemen, southern Saudi Arabia, United Arab Emirates and Israel (spillovers)
Status	Ongoing; Houthis take control of Sanaa (2014); Saudi Arabian-led coalition forces intervene from 26 March 2015, backing the Hadi-led government; Former President Saleh is assassinated in the Battle of Sanaa (2017); United Nations announce two-month nationwide truce on 2 April 2022; further extended on 2 June and officially expired in October; Hadi-led government resigns (7 April 2022); Transfer of power to the Presidential Leadership Council (PLC), consisting of Southern Transitional Council (STC) representatives; Rashad al-Alimi becomes President and STC President Aidarus al-Zoubaidi becomes Vice President; STC launches an offensive against the Islah party, taking large amounts of territory (August 2022); Negotiations to end the civil war that include all major combatants start in April 2023 after Iran and Saudi Arabia resume diplomatic relations; Red Sea crisis begins in 2023 leading to Operation Prosperity Guardian, US–UK airstrikes, US attacks, and Israeli attacks; STC launches an offensive against government forces in December 2025, seizing the Hadhramaut and al-Mahrah governorates; Government counteroffensive retakes Hadhramaut and al-Mahrah governorates in January 2026; STC subsequently dissolves; 2026 Yemen offensives begin in September 2026

Main belligerents
Supreme Political Council (formerly SRC); Houthis; GPC (pro-Houthi); Saleh loyalists (until 2017); Pro-Houthi Popular Committees	Republic of Yemen (internationally-recognized; led by the PLC since 2022); Yemeni Armed Forces; YRG; GPC; Yemeni National Resistance (since 2017); Giants Brigades; Tihamah Resistance; Hadhramaut Tribal Alliance; Al-Islah; Bani Dhabyan; Saleh loyalists (since 2017); Popular Resistance; Popular Committees; Multinational Maritime Defense Alliance: Saudi Arabia; United Arab Emirates (2015–2025); Egypt; Sudan Rapid Support Forces Janjaweed (2019–2023); Senegal (2015-2025); Morocco (2015–2019); Qatar; Kuwait; Jordan; Bahrain; Bangladesh; Comoros; Djibouti; Pakistan; Somalia; Turkey; STC (Note: From April 2022 to December 2025, the Southern Transitional Council was part of the Yemeni government led by the Presidential Leadership Council. Multiple sources: Salem, Mostafa; Kolirin, Lianne (7 April 2022). "Hopes of peace in Yemen as President hands power to new presidential council". CNN. Archived from the original on 8 April 2022.; Ghobari, Mohamed (7 April 2022). "Yemen president sacks deputy, delegates presidential powers to council". Aden: Reuters. Archived from the original on 1 May 2022.; Al-Sakani, Ali (19 April 2022). "Yemen inaugurates new presidential council". Al Jazeera. Archived from the original on 1 March 2023.; "Armed clashes reported between Yemeni army and southern separatists". Al Jazeera. 4 December 2025.) (2017–2026); (Southern Transitional Council) Southern Resistance (since September 2026); Israel (since 2023)	Al-Qaeda and allies; AQAP; Ansar al-Sharia; Council of Scholars of Ahl al-Sunna wal-Jama'ah; Hadhrami Domestic council; Dhi Na'im tribe; Al-Hamiqan tribe; Islamic State; Yemen Province

Commanders and leaders
Abdul-Malik al-Houthi; Muhammad al-Houthi; Mahdi al-Mashat; Hussein Khairan; Yusuf al-Madani	(Yemen) Rashad al-Alimi (2022–present); (Yemen) Abdrabbuh Mansour Hadi (2014–22); Salman bin Abdulaziz; (Southern Transitional Council) Aidarus al-Zoubaidi (AWOL); (Southern Transitional Council) Muhammad al-Malishi (2026–present); (Israel) Benjamin Netanyahu	

Strength
Disputed numbers: 150,000–200,000+ fighters (Yemeni claims) 350,000 (Western estimates)	113,500 soldiers and paramilitary 100 warplanes; 150,000 troops 30 warplanes; 10,000 troops 15 warplanes; 300 troops 10 warplanes; 1,000 troops 6 warplanes 6 warplanes; 1,500 troops 4 warplanes; over 40,000 troops 2,100 troops 4 warships and warplanes 1,800 security contractors	al-Qaeda; Ansar al-Sharia: 6,000–8,000; (Islamic State) IS: 300

Casualties and losses
"Thousands" killed (per Al Jazeera; as of May 2018); 11,000+ killed (Arab Coalition claim; as of December 2017)	(Yemen) Unknown; 1,000–3,000 Saudi losses: 10 captured; 5 aircraft lost; 8 helicopters lost 9 drones lost 20 M1A2s lost 1 frigate damaged; (United Arab Emirates) 108 soldiers killed Emirati losses: 2 aircraft lost 3 helicopters lost 1 minesweeper damaged 6 drones lost 1 watercraft damaged; (Sudan) 1,000–4,000 soldiers killed (Bahrain) 11 soldiers killed, 1 F-16 crashed (Qatar) 4 soldiers killed (Morocco) 10 servicemen killed, 1 F-16 shot down (Jordan) 1 F-16 lost 71 PMCs killed (United States) 1 killed American losses: 4 drones shot down 1 helicopter lost 1 tiltrotor craft lost	Al-Qaeda; AQAP 1,000 killed, 1,500 captured
- Overall 377,000+ direct and indirect deaths (150,000+ people killed in violence) (2014–2021) (UN); 85,000 Yemeni children dead from starvation (2015–2018) (Save the Children); ~4,000 dead from cholera epidemic; 2.5+ million cases overall (2016–2021); More than 5 million people cumulatively displaced (2026); 500+ killed in Saudi Arabia by Houthi attacks (2014–2016) (Saudi Arabia figure); 3 civilians killed in the United Arab Emirates

The following outline is provided as an overview of and topical guide to the Wikipedia articles available about the Yemeni crisis, revolution, and civil war.

Yemen has been in crisis since 2011, when Arab Spring protests forced President Ali Abdullah Saleh from office. The transition under his deputy, Abdrabbuh Mansour Hadi, broke down, and in September 2014 the Houthi movement took the capital, Sanaa. Hadi fled to Aden and then to Saudi Arabia, and in March 2015 a Saudi-led coalition began airstrikes. The war drew in Iran, al-Qaeda, and southern separatists backed by the United Arab Emirates, and left millions facing famine and disease. Hadi handed power to a Presidential Leadership Council in April 2022, and a UN truce agreed that month quieted the main front lines for four years without producing a settlement. Houthi attacks on Red Sea shipping began in late 2023, government and separatist forces fought over the south in the 2025–2026 southern Yemen campaign, and in 2026 the Houthis declared their de-escalation over and resumed strikes on government and Saudi targets.

== Overview ==
- Yemeni revolution
- Yemeni crisis
- Yemeni civil war (2014–present)
- Yemeni peace process
- Aftermath of the Houthi takeover in Yemen
- Foreign involvement in the Yemeni civil war (2014–present)
- War crimes in the Yemeni civil war (2014–present)

== Crisis and conflict ==
- Aden unrest (2015–2019)
- Blockade of Yemen
- Federalization of Yemen
- Houthi takeover of Yemen
- International reactions to the Saudi Arabian-led intervention in Yemen (2015–present)
- International reactions to the Yemeni revolution
- Iran–Saudi Arabia proxy war
- Saudi-led intervention in the Yemeni civil war
- United Arab Emirates occupation of Socotra
- United States intervention in Yemen
- United States support for Saudi Arabian–led operations in Yemen

=== Airstrikes and dronestrikes ===
- Drone strikes in Yemen, United States drone strikes in Yemen in 2002 and from 2009–present
- Saudi-led airstrikes on Yemen, 2015–2019
- US–UK airstrikes on Yemen, 2024–2025
- 30 May 2024 Yemen strikes
- March–May 2025 United States attacks in Yemen
- 20 July 2024 Israeli attack on Yemen
- 29 September 2024 Israeli attacks on Yemen
- December 2024 Israeli airstrikes in Yemen
- 26 December 2024 Israeli attack on Yemen
- May 2025 Israeli attacks on Yemen
- 28 August 2025 Israeli attacks on Yemen
- September 2025 Israeli attacks in Yemen

=== Timelines ===
- Timeline of the Yemeni crisis (2011–present)
- Timeline of the Yemeni revolution
- Timeline of the Yemeni revolution (January – 2 June 2011)
- Timeline of the Yemeni revolution (3 June – 22 September 2011)
- Timeline of the Yemeni revolution (23 September – December 2011)
- Timeline of the Yemeni revolution (January – 27 February 2012)
- Timeline of the Yemeni civil war (2014–present)
- Timeline of the Yemeni humanitarian crisis

=== Background and origins ===
- Al-Qaeda in the Arabian Peninsula
- Al-Qaeda insurgency in Yemen
- Houthi insurgency
- Operation Scorched Earth
- Houthi–Saudi Arabian conflict
- South Yemen insurgency
- Yemeni civil war (1994)

== Political and diplomatic process ==
- 2012 Yemeni presidential election
- Federalization of Yemen
- National Dialogue Conference (Yemen)
- Presidential Leadership Council
- Riyadh Agreement
- Yemeni peace process

=== United Nations ===
- United Nations Mission to support the Hudaydah Agreement
- United Nations Security Council Resolution 2564

== Events ==
=== Revolution and transition (2011–2014) ===
- Yemeni revolution
- Battle of Sanaa (2011)
- Battle of Taiz
- Battle of Zinjibar (2011–2012)
- Battle of Jaar (2011)
- Jaar munitions factory explosion
- Battle of Radda
- Battle of Lawdar (2012)
- Abyan campaign
- 2012 Unity Day parade rehearsal bombing
- 2013 Iranian diplomat kidnapping
- 2013 Sanaa shootings
- 2013 Yemeni Ministry of Defense attack
- Siege of Dammaj
- Battle of Amran
- 2014 hostage rescue operations in Yemen

=== Houthi takeover and outbreak of civil war (2014–2015) ===
- Houthi takeover of Yemen
- Battle of Sanaa (2014)
- Aftermath of the Houthi takeover in Yemen
- 2014 Southern Yemen offensive
- Battle of Aden (2015)
- Battle of Aden Airport
- Fall of Zinjibar and Jaar (2015)
- Saudi-led intervention in the Yemeni civil war

=== Battles, offensives and campaigns ===
- 2019 Southern Yemen clashes
- 2022 Southern Yemen offensive
- 2025–2026 southern Yemen campaign
- Al Bayda offensive
- Al-Hudaydah offensive
- Al-Jawf offensive
- Battle of Aden (2018)
- Battle of Al Hudaydah
- Battle of Al-Masini Valley
- Battle of Dhale
- Battle of Marib (2021–2022)
- Battle of Mukalla (2015)
- Battle of Mukalla (2016)
- Battle of Port Midi
- Battle of Saada
- Battle of Sanaa (2017)
- Battle of the Jabara Valley
- Fall of Aden (2026)
- Marib campaign
- Nihm Offensive
- Operation Blow to the Head
- Operation Victory from God
- Raid on Al Hathla
- Raid on Yakla
- Shabwah campaign
- Shabwah Governorate offensive
- Siege of Taiz
- Southern Abyan Offensive (2016)
- Southern Transitional Council conflict
- Southern Transitional Council takeover of Socotra

=== Airstrikes and missile attacks ===
- 2016 Al Anad Air Base missile attack
- 2019 Anad base drone strike
- 2021 Anad airbase attack
- 2022 Saada prison airstrike
- 2025 Ras Isa oil terminal airstrikes
- 2025 Saada prison airstrike
- Bombing of Mokha
- Dahyan airstrike
- Dhamar airstrike
- Hajjah Governorate airstrike
- October 2015 Aden missile attack
- Sanaa funeral airstrike
- Saudi-led airstrikes on Yemen

=== Bombings, terrorist attacks and assassinations ===
- 2014 Ibb bombing
- 2014 Radda bombings
- 2015 Aden car bombing
- 2015 Marib attack
- 2015 Taiz attack
- 2016 Aden car bombing
- 2020 Aden airport attack
- 2021 Aden bombings
- 2024 al-Bayda bombing
- 23 May 2016 Yemen bombings
- Assassination of Thabet Gawas
- August 2016 Aden bombing
- August 2020 Marib attack
- December 2016 Aden suicide bombings
- January 2015 Sanaa bombing
- January 2020 Marib attack
- June 2016 Mukalla attacks
- March 2015 Sanaa mosque bombings
- Marib petrol station attack
- May 2016 Yemen police bombings
- Missionaries of Charity attack in Aden
- September 2015 Sanaa mosque bombing

=== Insurgencies and separatist conflict ===
- Abyan conflict
- Al-Qaeda insurgency in Yemen
- Hadramaut insurgency
- Houthi insurgency
- Lahij insurgency
- South Yemen insurgency
- Southern Transitional Council conflict

=== Regional spillover ===
- 2015 Abha mosque bombing
- 2018 Riyadh missile strike
- 2019 Abha International Airport attacks
- 2019 Afif attack
- 2020 Riyadh drone and missile attack
- 2022 Abu Dhabi attack
- 2022 Jeddah missile attack
- 2025 United States–Houthi ceasefire
- Abqaiq–Khurais attack
- Houthi attacks on commercial vessels
- Houthi blockade of Saudi Arabia
- March–May 2025 United States attacks in Yemen
- Red Sea crisis
- US–UK airstrikes on Yemen

== Foreign involvement ==
- Foreign involvement in the Yemeni civil war (2014–present)
- Iran–Saudi Arabia proxy war
- Iranian support for the Houthis
- Saudi-led intervention in the Yemeni civil war
- Spear Operations Group
- United Arab Emirates occupation of Socotra
- United States intervention in Yemen
- United States support for Saudi Arabian–led operations in Yemen
- Yemen model

=== Evacuations and non-combatant operations ===
- Evacuation of Pakistani citizens during the Yemeni civil war (2015)
- Operation Raahat

== Units and groups ==
=== Government and allied forces ===
- Alliance of Yemeni Tribes
- Cabinet of Yemen
- Hashid
- Popular Committees (Yemen)
- Popular Resistance Committees (Yemen)
- Presidential Leadership Council
- Republican Guard (Yemen)
- Tihamah Resistance
- Yemeni Armed Forces
- Yemeni Border Guard Forces
- Yemeni National Resistance

=== Southern and separatist forces ===
- Hadhramaut Protection Forces
- Hadhramaut Tribal Alliance
- Hadhrami League
- Hadramout National Council
- Security Belt
- Shabwani Elite
- Southern Giants Brigades
- Southern Movement
- Southern Transitional Council

=== Houthi-aligned bodies and allied militias ===
- Liwa Fatemiyoun
- Liwa Zainabiyoun
- Supreme Political Council
- Supreme Revolutionary Committee

=== Political parties ===
- Al-Islah (Yemen)
- Arab Socialist Ba'ath Party – Yemen Region
- General People's Congress (Yemen)
- Nasserist Unionist People's Organisation
- National Arab Socialist Ba'ath Party – Yemen Region
- Yemen Renaissance Movement
- Yemeni Socialist Party

=== Jihadist groups ===
- Aden-Abyan Islamic Army
- Al-Qaeda in the Arabian Peninsula
- Ansar al-Sharia (Yemen)
- Islamic Jihad in Yemen

=== Other organizations ===
- Office of the Special Envoy of the Secretary-General for Yemen
- Spear Operations Group
- Yemen Cyber Army

== Individuals ==
=== Yemeni government and anti-Houthi figures ===
- Abd Rabbo Hussein
- Abdrabbuh Mansour Hadi
- Abdul Majeed al-Zindani
- Abdul-Hafez al-Saqqaf
- Abdul-Rab al-Shadadi
- Abdullah Al-Kibsi
- Abu Bakr Hussein Salem
- Ahmad Awad bin Mubarak
- Ahmed Ali al-Ashwal
- Ahmed Obaid Bin Dagher
- Ahmed Saleh
- Ali Abdullah Saleh
- Ali Mohsen al-Ahmar
- Ali Muhammad Mujawar
- Amin al-Waeli
- Hamid al-Ahmar
- Hussein Arab
- Hussein Khairan
- Jaafar Mohammed Saad
- Khaled Bahah
- Mahdi Maqula
- Mahmoud al-Subaihi
- Mohammed al-Sabry
- Mohammed Ali al-Maqdashi
- Mohammed Basindawa
- Mohsen al-Daeri
- Nasser al-Dhaibani
- Nasser Mansour Hadi
- Sadiq al-Ahmar
- Sagheer Hamoud Aziz
- Saleh al-Ja'imlani
- Sultan Ali al-Aradah
- Taher al-Aqili
- Tareq Saleh
- Tawakkol Karman
- Yahya Mohamed Abdullah Saleh

=== Southern Yemeni figures ===
- Abdullatif Al-Sayed
- Abu Zara'a
- Aidarus al-Zoubaidi
- Faisal Rajab
- Faraj al-Bahsani
- Munir Al Yafi

=== Houthi-aligned figures ===
- Abdul-Malik al-Houthi
- Ahmed al-Rahawi
- Fares Manaa
- Mahdi al-Mashat
- Mohamed al-Atifi
- Muhammad Abd al-Karim al-Ghamari
- Saleh Ali al-Sammad

=== Militant and jihadist figures ===
- Abu Bilal al-Harbi
- Harith bin Ghazi al-Nadhari
- Ibrahim Sulayman Muhammad al-Rubaysh
- Jalal Baleedi
- Khalid Batarfi
- Nasir al-Wuhayshi
- Nasser bin Ali al-Ansi
- Qasim al-Raymi
- Sa'ad bin Atef al-Awlaki
- Usayd al-Adani

=== Coalition and foreign figures ===
- Abdulrahman bin Saad al-Shahrani
- Abraham Golan
- Ahmad Asiri
- Fayyadh Al Ruwaili
- Hasan Irlu
- Ibrahim Hamzi
- Muhammad Al Shaalan
- Sultan Mohammed Ali al-Kitbi
- Turki al-Maliki

=== United Nations special envoys ===
- Hans Grundberg
- Ismail Ould Cheikh Ahmed
- Jamal Benomar
- Martin Griffiths

=== Journalists ===
- Jamal al-Sharabi
- Jamal Amer
- Jane Ferguson

== Humanitarian issues ==
- 2016–2022 Yemen cholera outbreak
- 2016–present Yemen famine
- Blockade of Yemen
- COVID-19 pandemic in Yemen
- Impact of Houthi policies on Yemen's humanitarian sector and NGOs
- Mobile schools in Yemen
- Refugees on Jeju Island
- Sanaa crowd crush
- Timeline of the Yemeni humanitarian crisis
- Water supply and sanitation in Yemen

=== War crimes and human rights ===
- 2014 Ibb bombing
- 2014 Radda bombings
- 2022 Saada prison airstrike
- 2025 Saada prison airstrike
- Bombing of Mokha
- Dahyan airstrike
- Dhamar airstrike
- Hajjah Governorate airstrike
- January 2015 Sanaa bombing
- March 2015 Sanaa mosque bombings
- Sanaa funeral airstrike
- Saudi-led airstrikes on Yemen
- September 2015 Sanaa mosque bombing
- War crimes in the Yemeni civil war (2014–present)

=== Detention facilities ===
- Beir Ahmed
- Riyan Airport prison

== Media, documents, resolutions, and statements ==
- Hunger Ward
- Karama Has No Walls
- Riyadh Agreement
- United Nations Security Council Resolution 2564
- Yemen: The Silent War

== Geographic ==
- Federalization of Yemen
- Houthi-controlled Yemen
- United Arab Emirates occupation of Socotra

== Lists ==
- List of armed groups in the Yemeni civil war
- List of aviation incidents during the Saudi-led intervention in the Yemeni civil war

== Other ==
- 2021 occupation of the United States embassy compound in Yemen
- Al-Bayda gas station explosion
- FSO Safer
- HSV-2 Swift
- Qaher-1

== See also ==
- Outline of Saudi Arabia
- Outline of the Houthi movement
- Outline of Yemen
- Timeline of the Arab Spring
