= 2015 Sanaa mosque bombings =

2015 Sanaa mosque bombings may refer to:

- March 2015 Sanaa mosque bombings
- September 2015 Sanaa mosque bombing
