= Impact of Houthi policies on Yemen's humanitarian sector and NGOs =

The policies of the Houthi armed group have greatly affected Yemen's humanitarian sector and NGOs in areas under their control, including the capital Sana'a. The group attempts to exert control over all humanitarian efforts in the area and detains humanitarian workers.

== Monopoly over humanitarian operations through SCMCHA ==
In 2019, the Houthis established the Supreme Council for the Management and Coordination of Humanitarian Affairs and International Cooperation (SCMCHA), as a successor to the "National Authority for the Management and Coordination of Humanitarian Affairs and Disaster Response" (NAMCHA), which had been created by them also in mid-October 2017.

SCMCHA is a Houthi-controlled body overseeing humanitarian aid in areas under their control. According to the Arab Center Washington DC, local civil society actors and humanitarian workers have expressed concerns regarding SCMCHA’s role. Many have reported that the organisation’s primary functions include gathering intelligence on independent humanitarian groups, imposing restrictions on local and international aid organisations, and deducting funds from international aid allocations. SCMCHA maintained a monopoly over humanitarian activities in Houthi-controlled areas, requiring civil society groups to adhere to Houthi regulations and operate under strict supervision. Furthermore, according to Crown Center for Middle East Studies, SCMCHA also exercised authority over staff appointments across civil society, including in INGOs.

International humanitarian organisations have criticised SCMCHA's practices. In February 2020, a dispute arose between the Houthis and UN agencies after Houthi authorities demanded a 2% tax on all UN humanitarian programmes. The dispute led to a temporary suspension of aid by international donors, prompting the Houthis to abandon the taxation plan, which allowed aid to resume. Houthi authorities have reportedly implemented alternative methods to derive financial benefits from humanitarian aid. For example, during Ramadan in 2022, they issued an order prohibiting donations outside their control and requiring licenses for such activities. Observers have noted that international aid organisations, committed to impartiality, often comply with Houthi directives, inadvertently enabling the group to benefit from aid intended for vulnerable populations and local organisations.

A recent report by the Counter Extremism Project (CEP) highlighted that aid diversion by the Houthis has been a persistent issue for nearly a decade. The report also noted that SCMCHA was dissolved on 9 October 2024, with its responsibilities transferred to the Houthi Ministries of Foreign Affairs and Labour and Social Affairs. The disbandment of SCMCHA may have been influenced by international pressure on humanitarian organisations to cease cooperation with the agency due to its alleged interference and diversion of aid.

== Enforced disappearance of NGO and humanitarian staff ==
Since May 31, 2024, Houthi security forces in Yemen have reportedly arrested and forcibly disappeared dozens of people, including at least 13 United Nations (UN) staff members and numerous employees of Non-governmental organization (NGOs) operating in Houthi-controlled territories, according to a report by Human Rights Watch (HRW). These detentions appear to target individuals based on their current or past employment.

Human Rights Watch described the arrests as a political tool, with researcher Niku Jafarnia stating, "The Houthis are using arbitrary detentions and enforced disappearances as a political tool at a time when the people living in their territories lack even the most basic needs."

Human Rights Watch interviewed 20 individuals with knowledge of the arrests, as well as four Yemen analysts. The detainees were reportedly taken without warrants, and their families were not informed of their whereabouts. The detainees have been held incommunicado, denied access to lawyers, and refused contact with their families, meeting the criteria for enforced disappearances under international law. Despite inquiries from Human Rights Watch, the Houthi authorities have not responded, and no formal charges have been brought against the detainees. However, past cases suggest the Houthis may bring politically motivated charges, such as espionage.

In one high-profile incident, Houthi authorities detained the husband and two children of a woman working with a civil society organization. Additionally, detainees have been denied medical supplies, even for serious health conditions, raising further concerns about their well-being.

Since June 10, 2024, Houthi-affiliated media outlets, including the Al-Masirah TV channel, have aired videos showing Yemeni men detained between 2021 and 2023. These videos depict coerced confessions, with the men alleging they spied for the United States and Israel. Human Rights Watch highlighted the lack of credibility of these confessions, noting the Houthis’ history of using torture to extract statements. Analysts fear that the recent arrests may be linked to attempts to frame the detainees as part of a supposed "spy network."

The UN and other international bodies have called for the immediate release of detainees. UN Secretary-General, António Guterres, and High Commissioner for Human Rights, Volker Türk, have expressed particular concern for the detained UN and NGO staff. However, sources told Human Rights Watch that some UN agencies and NGOs have not adequately supported the families of detainees, prompting criticism.

According to Amnesty International, the recent wave of arrests by Houthi authorities has created an atmosphere of fear among civil society workers, who now feel increasingly at risk of arrest or reprisal for carrying out their duties. These arrests coincided with a Houthi-led media campaign accusing humanitarian organizations and their staff of "conspiring" against Yemen’s interests through their projects.

Amnesty International also reported that the Houthis have a history of targeting human rights and humanitarian workers. Four Yemeni staff members from the Office of the High Commissioner for Human Rights (OHCHR) and UNESCO, arrested in 2021 and 2023, remain arbitrarily detained and have been held incommunicado since their arrests. In another case, in September 2023, Houthi authorities arrested Hisham Al-Hakimi, the Safety and Security Director at Save the Children. Al-Hakimi was held incommunicado and died on 25 October 2023 while still in arbitrary detention.

Human Rights Watch urged the international community, including mediating countries like Oman, to intensify efforts to secure the release of the detainees and hold the Houthis accountable for their actions.

== See also ==
- Outline of the Yemeni Crisis, revolution, and civil war (2011-present)
- Human rights in Yemen
- Timeline of the Yemeni Civil War (2014–present)
- Timeline of the Yemeni humanitarian crisis
