= United States support for Saudi Arabian–led operations in Yemen =

During the presidency of Barack Obama, the United States began providing Saudi Arabia with critical support to "sustain" the Saudi Arabian–led intervention in the Yemeni Civil War, launched at the request of the Yemeni government, later expanded during the presidency of Donald Trump. This support included logistical and intelligence aid. Trump vetoed a bipartisan bill in 2019 aimed at stopping U.S. support for the Saudi-led coalition in Yemen. In 2021, Joe Biden vowed to halt U.S. support for the war, though U.S. arms sales to the coalition have continued.

From 2015 to 2019, Saudi Arabia was reportedly the largest importer of U.S. arms.

== Background ==
The ongoing Yemeni Civil War began in September 2014, when Houthi forces took over the capital city of Sanaa. The incident was followed by a rapid Houthi takeover of the government. On 21 March 2015, the Houthi-led Supreme Revolutionary Committee declared a general mobilization to overthrow Yemeni president Abdrabbuh Mansur Hadi, and expand their control by driving into southern provinces. By 25 March, Lahij fell to the Houthis and they reached the outskirts of Aden, the seat of power for Hadi's government. Hadi fled the country the same day.

A coalition led by Saudi Arabia launched military operations by using air strikes to restore the former Yemeni government. The United States has provided intelligence and logistical support for the Saudi-led campaign, which continues despite the Biden administration's pledges to withdraw U.S. support for Saudi Arabia in the Yemeni Civil War.

== Timeline ==
=== Obama administration ===
President Barack Obama said in March 2015 that he has authorized U.S. soldiers to give logistical and intelligence aid to the Saudis in their military action in Yemen, launching a "Joint Planning Cell" with Saudi Arabia. This support involves aerial refueling, which allows coalition aircraft to spend more time over Yemen, and allowing some coalition members to home base aircraft instead of transferring them to Saudi Arabia.

During the Obama Administration, The United States has also been criticised for allegedly supplying cluster munitions to Saudi Arabian forces. Cluster munitions are often considered unacceptable due their largely indiscriminate function and high risk of unexploded munitions. The United States is not party to the Cluster Munition Coalition, which bans the use of Cluster munitions. Human Rights Watch argued in August 2016 that the United States' direct support of the Saudi forces, in particular in providing intelligence and in-air refueling has made it a party to the conflict.

On 13 October 2016, the USS Nitze fired Tomahawk missiles against Houthi-controlled radar installations "in the Dhubab district of Taiz province, a remote area overlooking the Bab al-Mandab Strait known for fishing and smuggling."

In October 2016, Reuters obtained documents under the Freedom of Information Act showing officials had warned that the United States could be implicated in war crimes for its support of Saudi Arabia's intervention.

=== First Trump administration ===
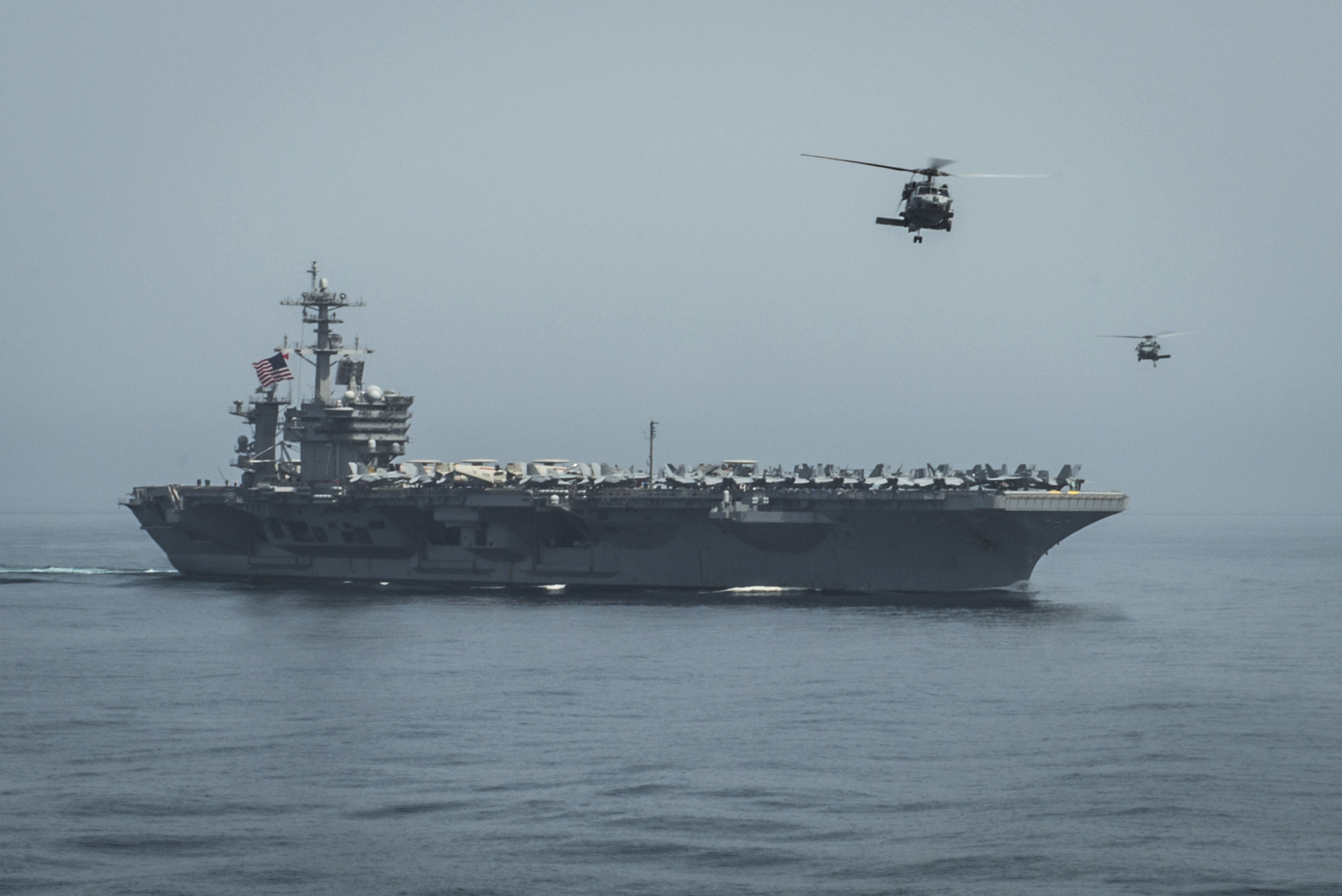
The U.S. Navy has actively participated in the Saudi-led naval blockade, which humanitarian organizations argue has been the main contributing factor to the outbreak of famine in Yemen.

On 29 January 2017, the first United States raid authorised by President Donald Trump ended in multiple civilian deaths, including the death of Anwar al-Awlaki's eight-year-old daughter. According to the Guardian, the raid had been planned under the Obama administration, but it had been thought that the underlying intelligence did not justify the risks involved in carrying out the raid. Colonel John Thomas, a spokesman for U.S. Central Command stated that the United States military forces were neither aware of the presence of Nawar al-Awlaki in the compound, nor that any of the estimated 14 people killed in the raid were civilians.

U.S. support for the Saudi-led coalition was expanded during the presidency of Donald Trump, who "announced plans to increase training for the Saudi air force," and according to a 2020 report, "authorized $27.4bn in U.S. arms sales to Saudi Arabia during his first three years in office." Trump's administrator's deal with Saudi Arabia included precision-guided bombs to Saudi Arabia and the upgrade of its F-15 aircraft, which U.S supplies.

Trump vetoed a bipartisan bill in April 2019 that sought to stop U.S. backing for the Saudi-led military involvement and the United States Senate failed to overturn the veto with 53 votes instead of the 67 required.

In June 2019, US secretary of state Mike Pompeo, blocked the inclusion of Saudi Arabia on the US list of countries that recruit child soldiers, dismissing State department experts' findings.

=== Biden administration ===
On 4 February 2021, Joe Biden declared a halt to U.S. backing for Saudi-led operations in Yemen. Biden called in his first address as the U.S. president for the Yemen war to end, saying that the war has "created a humanitarian and strategic catastrophe." Nonetheless, the humanitarian situation in Yemen has worsened in many ways since Biden took office, according to The Intercept. The U.S. has continued selling arms to the Saudi-led coalition. In June 2021, the Biden Administration did not provide any answer to congressional queries regarding the level of continuing American involvement in Yemen.

Secretary of State Antony Blinken withdrew the Houthis from a terror list issued by his predecessor, Mike Pompeo, in his final days, which the U.N. and many relief organizations had warned would have significant consequences for the almost 24 million Yemeni people who are living in Houthi-held territory. The Biden administration said that the lifting of the designation was primarily meant to "alleviate or at least not worsen the suffering of the Yemeni civilians who live under Houthi control," which was not effective according to the field visit by David Beasley, Executive Director of World Food Program, who "sounded the alarm" adding that one of the most serious consequences of the fuel shortage was widespread power outages at hospitals. When asked in January 2022 if he would consider the UAE's request that the U.S. re-designate the Houthis as a terrorist organization, Biden indicated the move was "under consideration."

== Analysis ==
Saudi Arabia has reportedly remained the world's largest importer of U.S. arms since the war in Yemen began, with major imports increasing by 130 percent from 2015 to 2019 compared to the previous five-year period. Saudi Arabia has been historically receiving security assistance from the U.S. since 1945 when Roosevelt met King Abdul Aziz and agreed to a deal. Restoring the UN-recognized government of Yemen and defending Saudi Arabia borders against possible Yemen-based Houthis are among the U.S.'s stated goals for assisting the Saudi-led operations in Yemen.

According to an Al Jazeera report, a motive for U.S. aid could be the diplomatic logic of lowering Saudi Arabia's opposition to the Iranian nuclear deal by supporting them. Another viewpoint held by certain U.S. military officers is that confronting Iran takes strategic priority over fighting al-Qaeda and ISIL. According to press reports in 2015, many individuals in the U.S. SOCOM embrace the Houthis because they have proven effective in combating al-Qaeda and ISIL, recently, "something that hundreds of U.S. drone strikes and large numbers of advisers to Yemen's military had failed to accomplish".

According to the Brookings Institution, Biden's approach is "fatally flawed", considering that little has changed since Biden's promise to end U.S. support for the offensive operation in Yemen led by Saudi Arabia. Another flaw in Biden's approach stems from the fact that "he did not call for an immediate end to the Saudi blockade of Yemen." Brookings added that Biden not only did contribute to the humanitarian disaster, but he also "signaled" that the blockade was an acceptable condition for negotiation.

Bruce Riedel, a senior fellow at the Brookings Institution, told Al Jazeera in 2021 that "the United States provides spare parts, munitions, technical assistance, all kinds of things to the Saudi military, which enable its offensive operations."

A joint analysis by The Washington Post and Security Force Monitor at Columbia Law School's Human Rights Institute revealed the depth of U.S. support in the air campaigns carried out by Saudi-led coalition in Yemen. According to an estimate by the Armed Conflict Location and Event Data Project (ACLED), around 15,000 Yemeni people were killed by air campaigns carried out by Saudi-led coalition.

== Human rights record and legality under international law ==
Joe Biden has described the U.S. support for Saudi-led coalition as "Donald Trump's 'blank check' for Saudi Arabia's human rights abuses at home and abroad." According to a March 2016 Human Rights Watch assessment, the U.S. involvement in certain military actions, including as target selection and aerial refueling during Saudi air raids "may make US forces jointly responsible for laws-of-war violations by coalition forces". According to the Guardian reporting in September, one in every three bombing raids targeted civilian targets.

Mohamad Bazzi contended in The Nation that Michael Mulroy's defense of U.S. backing as necessary to limit civilian casualties was untrue and that "Saudi leaders and their allies have ignored American entreaties to minimize civilian casualties since the war's early days"; both Saudi Arabia and the United States can be considered to have committed laws-of-war violations.

According to the Office of Inspector General report issued in August 2020, the State Department watchdog found that Secretary of State Mike Pompeo declared an emergency to facilitate the sale of arms worth billions of dollars to Saudi Arabia, the United Arab Emirates, and Jordan, in accordance with legal requirements. However, the report also found that the threats to civilian life in Yemen associated with the weaponry sale were not fully reviewed when the emergency was declared. Additionally, the study stated that the State Department's frequent authorization of arms sales to the Gulf states, Saudi Arabia, and the United Arab Emirates, exceeded the limits of AECA.

For years, the United States' participation in Yemen and its justification under international law have drawn criticism from legal scholars.

== See also ==
- Outline of the Yemeni crisis, revolution, and civil war (2011–present)
- Timeline of the Yemeni crisis (2011–present)
