= International reactions to the Yemeni revolution =

International reactions to the Yemeni revolution were not as pronounced as reactions to similar events during the Arab Spring, but a number of governments and organisations made statements on Yemen before and after the departure of longtime President Ali Abdullah Saleh from power in February 2012.

== Supranational organisations ==
- European Union – The EU leadership threw its support behind a Gulf Co-operation Council initiative to end violence in Yemen and mandate a political transition in which President Ali Abdullah Saleh would gradually give up power and a new government would be democratically elected by the Yemeni people. Even after an assassination attempt left Saleh hospitalised and out of the country, High Representative Catherine Ashton visited Sana'a in late July 2011 in a prolonged attempt to convince the Yemeni government to accept the GCC deal.
- Gulf Cooperation Council – Starting in April 2011, the GCC endeavoured to mediate in the crisis in Yemen, a member state of the supranational body. Though a peace deal requiring a unity government to be formed and Saleh to leave power to make way for democratic elections was accepted by the Yemeni opposition, the GCC's efforts were spurned by President Saleh three times before being suspended in late May.
- United Nations – On 20 March, UN Secretary-General Ban Ki-moon urged the Yemeni government to institute "bold reforms" and engage in a national dialogue with the opposition. Ban also condemned state violence against protesters. A UN special envoy warned on 25 July while in Sana'a that "Yemen is suffering from the collapse of the state" and reiterated the UN's support of efforts for a "conciliation dialogue". The envoy also said the UN position is that any solution to the crisis, including a separatist insurgency in South Yemen, a sectarian insurgency in North Yemen, and conflict with the militant group Al Qaeda in the Arabian Peninsula that preceded but have overlapped and occasionally intersected with the popular uprising in the country, must be internal. On 9 August, the United Nations Security Council issued a statement urging an end to the violence and entreating all sides to allow humanitarian aid and supplies to proceed normally.

== Countries ==
- Australia – The Australian Department of Foreign Affairs and Trade warned Australians in Yemen to leave immediately and said Australians should not travel to Yemen. A statement on its website read in part, "It is unclear whether the security forces will be able to maintain law and order and there is a risk of open conflict between elements of the security forces and with opposition groups. These events heighten the risk of a spread of violence in Yemen and a breakdown in law and order, not only in Sana'a, but in other major cities and regional areas."
- Brazil – On 28 January, a statement issued by the Brazilian Foreign Ministry called for escalating unrest in Yemen to be resolved "peacefully and without external interference".
- Canada – On 6 March, the Canadian Foreign Affairs and International Trade Department said, "Canadians should leave Yemen as soon as possible, the Department of Foreign Affairs reiterated Sunday, as new political violence swept the Middle Eastern nation." At the G8 summit in France, on 26 May, Prime Minister Stephen Harper said, "I think everybody recognizes that it is time for the president of Yemen to depart and I think that's inevitable and the sooner it happens the better."
- China – At a 20 April emergency meeting of the United Nations Security Council, China prevented a resolution condemning violence against Yemeni protesters from being considered.
- Ethiopia – The Ethiopian Ministry of Foreign Affairs began evacuating Ethiopian nationals from Yemen on 20 June.
- France – A spokesman for the French Foreign Ministry said on 26 May that Saleh's only option to quell the uprising was to sign the Gulf Co-operation Council deal. He said the government deplored the ongoing violence and "political impasse".
- Germany – While on a visit to Hanoi, Vietnam, on 5 June, German Foreign Minister Guido Westerwelle called human rights violations in Yemen "not acceptable". In a statement emailed from Berlin that included Westerwelle's remarks, the Foreign Ministry also announced the closure of its embassy in Sana'a due to violence in the capital city.
- Iran – A spokesman for the Iranian Foreign Ministry condemned Yemeni authorities over the deaths of 52 protesters on 18 March and criticised unspecified "foreign forces" for their role in the crackdown. The comments were delivered the day after the incident.
- Italy – The Italian Foreign Ministry suspended the operations of its embassy in Sana'a on 1 June, citing what it perceived to be the growing risk of violence against European diplomats and embassies in the country amid street clashes in the city.
- Japan – On 26 May, while attending the G8 summit in Deauville, France, a Japanese Foreign Ministry spokesman called the mounting casualties in Yemen "extremely regrettable" and urged Saleh to "follow through on his commitments to peacefully transfer power".
- Kuwait – The Kuwaiti government reacted to the Battle of Sana'a, an incident involving prolonged clashes in the capital city of Sana'a during late May and early June, by withdrawing diplomatic staff from its embassy in the city on 1 June.
- Netherlands – The Netherlands Embassy in Yemen issued a statement on 9 April condemning the violence and announcing the suspension of aid from the Netherlands through the Yemeni government. The statement also called for "inclusive dialogue" and insisted the government "respect ... all human rights and fundamental freedoms".
- Philippines – On 20 March, the Philippines' Foreign Affairs Secretary Albert del Rosario visited Sana'a to meet with embassy staff and Yemeni officials to establish a contingency plan for Filipinos living in the country in case of a wider emergency. The Department of Foreign Affairs urged Filipino expatriates in Yemen on 24 March to avoid getting involved in political protests or activity. On 31 May, it began offering free repatriation for Filipinos in Yemen and urged its citizens abroad in the Arabian state to take advantage of the evacuation programme.
- Qatar – On 6 April, Qatari Prime Minister Hamad bin Jassim bin Jaber Al Thani said GCC member states "hope to reach a deal with the Yemeni president to step down". However, the prime minister withdrew Qatar from the GCC's efforts to mediate an end to the crisis in Yemen on 13 May, citing "indecision and delays in the signature of the proposed agreement" and "the intensity of the clashes" throughout Yemen as his reason for doing so.
- Russia – In its capacity as a permanent member of the UN Security Council, Russia helped block a resolution condemning the Yemeni government over its response to the crackdown on 20 April. Foreign Minister Sergei Lavrov expressed his government's strong support for Yemeni authorities in late June, telling Acting President Abd al-Rab Mansur al-Hadi by phone that he had Russia's "[unlimited] support".
- Saudi Arabia – The Saudi government was instrumental in orchestrating the GCC peace deal, even offering its capital of Riyadh as a venue for the official signing ceremony. After Saleh rebuffed the agreement multiple times before being badly injured in a 3 June bombing of the presidential compound, Saudi Arabia invited the president and other top Yemeni officials hurt in the attack to undergo intensive treatment at a hospital in Riyadh. On 17 June, Agence France-Presse reported a Saudi official said Saleh would not be allowed to return to Yemen.
- United Arab Emirates – UAE Foreign Minister Abdullah bin Zayed Al Nahyan urged Yemen to adopt the GCC deal "as an integrated formula to resolve the Yemeni crisis" during a 23 April meeting with his Yemeni counterpart. When pro-government gunmen briefly besieged the UAE embassy in Sana'a on 22 May, stranding Emirati, GCC, and Western diplomats inside, he urged the Yemeni government to secure the embassy.
- United Kingdom – On 19 February, the BBC News reported that UK Foreign Secretary William Hague said he was "deeply concerned" by the "unacceptable violence" used against protesters. On 18 February, the UK government had announced that in light of the unrest it was considering revoking some arms export licenses stating that "licenses will not be issued when officials judge that there is a risk that the exports may provoke regional or internal conflicts or be used to facilitate internal repression". On 4 June, the UK Foreign Secretary advised any Britons still in Yemen to leave immediately while commercial flights are still in operation, as the UK Government cannot guarantee evacuation under the circumstances. However, on 6 June it was reported that UK Royal Navy forces are on standby off the coast of Yemen to assist with any possible evacuation. Prime Minister David Cameron and US President Barack Obama urged Saleh to resign in a joint press conference on 25 May.
- United States – On 27 January, US Assistant Secretary of State for Public Affairs Philip J. Crowley told reporters that the US government backed the right of Yemenis to "express themselves and assemble freely". The US also later said that it had hopes reform attempts would stave off protests similar to Egypt. On 18 February, U.S. President Barack Obama said that he was "deeply concerned" by the violence. On the same day, The Washington Post reported that the United States Embassy in Yemen wrote in a statement that it had seen "a disturbing rise in the number and violence of attacks against Yemeni citizens gathering peacefully to express their views on the current political situation", adding, "We have also seen reports that Government of Yemen officials were present during these attacks", and asked the Yemeni government to "prevent any further attacks on peaceful demonstrations". On 1 March, The New York Times reported that after cleric Abdul Majid al-Zindani, a one-time mentor of Osama bin Laden, publicly called for an Islamic state to replace Saleh, one counterterrorism official in the Obama administration said Saleh's government was "the best partner we'll have ... and hopefully it will survive". However, on 3 April, the Times reported that US diplomats had begun quietly pushing for a "negotiated exit" for Saleh and believed he should hand over power to Vice President Hadi pending elections. On 8 April, State Department spokesman Mark Toner announced the administration's support for the GCC deal, a centerpiece of which was Saleh's timely resignation, saying in a statement, "We strongly encourage all sides to engage in this urgently needed dialogue to reach a solution supported by the Yemeni people. ... To succeed, all parties must participate in a process that addresses the legitimate concerns of the Yemeni people, including their political and economic aspirations." Secretary of State Hillary Clinton expressed disappointment on 23 May after Saleh backed away from signing the GCC deal for the third time, saying Saleh "is turning his back on his commitments and disregarding the legitimate aspirations of the Yemeni people" and urging him to accept the initiative. Speaking alongside British Prime Minister David Cameron on 25 May, President Obama said, "We call upon President Saleh to move immediately on his commitment to transfer power." After Saleh was hospitalised in Saudi Arabia following an assassination attempt, the US assisted the Yemeni government in investigating the bombing while reportedly pushing for Saleh to not be allowed to return to Yemen, though Assistant Secretary for Near Eastern Affairs Jeffrey Feltman said on a visit to Sana'a on 23 June, "We expect the president to take a decision in the best interests of the Yemeni people. It is a Yemeni decision, not an American decision." White House counterterrorism adviser John O. Brennan held a televised meeting with Saleh in his Riyadh hospital on 11 July to reiterate the US position that the president should accept the GCC initiative. Relations between the U.S. and the Yemeni government appeared to warm following Saleh's return to Sana'a and the death of Anwar al-Awlaki in a U.S. airstrike coordinated with Yemeni authorities, but U.S. State Department spokeswoman Victoria Nuland continued to articulate her government's position that Saleh should step down.

== Financial markets ==
On 2 February, Brent Crude crossed US$100 on concern over instability. The following day, crude oil rose for the fifth day in a row on speculation of spreading protests and the prospect of uncertainty.

Regional financial stock market indices fell on 20 February on concern of spreading instability.

== See also ==
- Outline of the Yemeni crisis, revolution, and civil war (2011–present)
- Timeline of the Yemeni crisis (2011–present)
