= January 2015 Sanaa bombing =

Terrorist attack in Yemen

2015 Sanaa bombing
- Part of the Yemeni Civil War (2014-present)
- Location of Sanaa Governorate in Yemen
- Location: 15.342092°N 44.207911°E; Sanaa, Yemen
- Date: January 7, 2015
- Target: Houthi fighters, Yemeni Police
- Attack type: Car bombing
- Deaths: 38+
- Injuries: 63+

On 7 January 2015, a car bomb was detonated in front of a police academy in the Yemeni capital Sanaa, killing at least 38 people and injuring more than 60 others. This was the third major attack in the country in less than a month, after the deadliest attack in the country during 2014, as well as the second major bombing in less than a month, after the 2014 Rada' bombings and the 2014 Ibb bombing.

The attack took place on the same day as the Charlie Hebdo shooting in Paris, France, which was also allegedly carried out by Yemeni al-Qaeda.

== Bombing ==
The bombing took place early in the morning and targeted a large group of Houthi fighters and civilians standing near the entrance of a police officers' academy in central Sanaa. The area contains the country's central bank and the Defense Ministry, itself the site of a major bombing in December 2013.

The powerful blast destroyed parts of nearby buildings and killed dozens instantly. Witnesses reported large plumes of smoke rising from the area after the attack. Emergency officials were struggling to deal with a large number of seriously injured and warned that casualty numbers may rise further. According to officials, most of the victims were young men waiting to enroll at the academy, as well as many police cadets. No group claimed immediate responsibility for the bombing, although it is suspected to be the work of Al-Qaeda.
