= 2014 Ibb bombing =

Terrorist incident in Yemen

- Part of the Yemeni Civil War (2014-present)
- Location of Ibb Governorate in Yemen
- Location: Ibb, Ibb Governorate, Yemen
- Date: December 31, 2014
- Attack type: Suicide bombing
- Deaths: 49
- Injuries: 70

On December 31, 2014, a suicide bomber blew himself up at the cultural center in Ibb, Yemen, killing as many as 49 people and injuring up to 70 others. This was the deadliest attack in the country during 2014, as well as the second major bombing in less than a month, after the 2014 Rada' bombings.

== Bombing ==
In celebration of Muhammad's birthday, Houthis supporters organized a celebration for students at the cultural center in Ibb. Over 500 people were in attendance at the event. Around 11:00 a.m., in the back of the hall, a suicide bomber dressed as a woman, blew himself up using an explosive belt he was wearing. Prior to blowing himself up, the suicide bomber was socializing with guests and did not appear out of the ordinary to other attendees. The group responsible for the bombing was, and still is unknown, although it is suspected to be Al-Qaeda. A second bomb was discovered, prior to detonation, near the entrance to the building.

== Reactions ==
=== National ===
- President Abdrabbuh Mansur Hadi: "I send my condolences to Ibb Governor and to martyrs families for criminal and terrorist attack" were his words through a telegram which also emphasized that "one so brutal action demonstrates that it seek cowardly deprive of the elements of human values and moral and religious principles".
- Cabinet: "We have to work for stop the bloodshed every day, it´s too violence, destruction, bloodshed and grief." The Council strongly condemns this terrorist act independently of the murderer and intellectual authors. Also, it underlined "the humanitarians, religious, nationals and moral values"... underlining that "this despicable act reflects their stray thoughts and the blind and black hatred against this nation and its people." The hall expressed its condolences to the families who have lost loved ones too and said the security services will investigate the tragedy to find the culprits. The Government will help to the injured and wounded, they added.

=== International ===
- United States: The United States Department of State responded to the bombing, stating "The United States strongly condemns today’s suicide attacks against a peaceful local gathering in Ibb, Yemen, which killed over 30 people, including children, who were celebrating a religious holiday. We extend our deepest condolences to the families of those killed and wounded in the attack. We will continue to stand with the Government of Yemen and the Yemeni people to counter the shared threat posed by violent extremists."
- France: In response to the bombing, France stated, "France condemns the attack that killed 49 people in Ibb on December 31. It extends its condolences to the victims’ families and expresses its sympathy with the injured. We reaffirm our support for the Yemeni authorities and people in their fight against terrorism and call on all parties to reject all forms of violence."
- Turkey: The Turkish Foreign Ministry responded, stating that "We strongly condemn the terrorist attack which was perpetrated today in Ibb Province of Yemen targeting a cultural center and caused death and injury of many people. We wish God’s mercy upon those who lost their lives in the attack, convey our condolences to their families and the brotherly people of Yemen, and wish also speedy recovery to the wounded. We observe the recently increasing terrorist attacks in Yemen with sadness. Peace, security and stability in Yemen can only be ensured by enabling the control of state authority throughout the country and establishing the public order. Turkey will continue to support the efforts in line with this goal."
- Iran: Marziyeh Afkham, spokeswoman for the Iran Foreign Ministry, condemned the bombing. In a speech she gave, she asked for " cooperation among all Yemeni parties and factions to implement the peace agreement in the country". She also said that the people of Yemen will "uproot terrorism".
