= 2022 Jeddah missile attack =

Houthi strike on a Saudi Arabian oil depot

- Part of the Saudi Arabian-led intervention in Yemen and the Yemeni civil war
- Location within Saudi Arabia
- Location: Jeddah, Saudi Arabia
- Date: 25 March 2022
- Target: Aramco oil depot
- Attack type: Drone and missile strike
- Injuries: None
- Perpetrator: Houthis

On 25 March 2022, the Houthi movement in Yemen conducted drone and missile attacks on an oil storage facility in Saudi Aramco's North Jeddah Bulk Plant on the outskirts of Jeddah, triggering a large fire. This attack is considered a turning point in the Yemeni civil war which led to the Houthis agreeing to a ceasefire with the Saudi-led coalition.

== Background ==
Two months prior to this attack, the Houthis conducted a similar drone and missile attack on Abu Dhabi, United Arab Emirates on 17 January 2022, blowing up an oil tanker and killing three people. In September 2019, an attack on Abqaiq-Khurais claimed by the Houthis damaged key oil processing plants in eastern Saudi Arabia and temporarily rendered them offline.

== Attack ==
The Houthi attack hit a fuel distribution station belonging to Saudi Aramco, setting two storage tanks on fire and causing black smoke to engulf the sky over Jeddah. According to the spokesman of the Saudi-led coalition, Turki al-Maliki, the blazes had been brought under control and no one had been hurt. Oil briefly rose above $120 a barrel but later dropped slightly.

The attack is notable because it took place approximately 11 km (7 mi) from the Jeddah Corniche Circuit, where the 2022 Formula One Saudi Arabian Grand Prix was being held. Black smoke was visible from the circuit during the first practice session, with some drivers remarking on a "burning" smell in the car. The second practice session was delayed by 15 minutes to allow for an emergency meeting between the drivers, team principals and Formula One CEO Stefano Domenicali. Despite the attack, Formula One and the organizers announced that the event would continue as planned.

The Grand Prix Drivers' Association held a further meeting with the drivers at 10 p.m. local time; all drivers agreed to participate for the remainder of the event after four and a half hours of talks. According to the BBC, Formula One's management, staff, drivers & spectators were reassured over security and convinced to carry on the race weekend after being warned of "the consequences of not racing," which reportedly included potentially being denied exit visa to leave the country in the event of a boycott.

== Retaliation ==
In retaliation to the attack, the Saudi-led coalition hit Houthi targets in Yemen, bombing a power plant, fuel supply station, and a social insurance office in Sanaa. In response, the Houthis unilaterally declared a three-day ceasefire and indicated that they were willing to negotiate a permanent ceasefire in attacks against the Saudi-led coalition.

== Reactions ==
- Saudi Arabia: Saudi Arabia said that it reserves the right to respond to the Houthi aggression. Saudi ambassador to the United States, Princess Reema bint Bandar, stated "The Iran-backed terrorist Houthis continue to attack our civilians, infrastructure & energy facilities with Iranian-made missiles & UAV’s with impunity. The international community must act against this aggression that targets innocent civilians and global energy supplies."
- Bahrain: Bahrain said it backs all measures Saudi Arabia "deems necessary to maintain its security and stability against these deliberate and systematic attacks that are inconsistent with international humanitarian law."
- Canada: Canada condemned the attack and called on the Houthis to negotiate, reject violence, and cease all attacks.
- Egypt: Egyptian President Abdel Fattah el-Sisi condemned the attack and said Egypt stands in solidarity with Saudi Arabia to confront hostilities.
- Israel: Israeli Prime Minister Naftali Bennet said Israel "expresses its sorrow to the Kingdom of Saudi Arabia after the horrific attack by the Iranian-backed Houthis."
- Kuwait: Kuwait condemned the attack as a "cowardly terrorist attack" which not only effects Saudi security and stability but also global energy supply.
- Morocco: King Mohammed VI strongly condemned the attack and reiterated Morocco's full solidarity with Saudi Arabia.
- Sudan: Sudan condemned the attack as a dangerous escalation and declared support for Saudi Arabia's security measures.
- United Arab Emirates: The UAE condemned the attack and called on the international community to stand against the repeated acts of aggression, calling for support of the Saudi-led coalition's efforts.
- United Kingdom: UK Prime Minister Boris Johnson condemned the attack, stating that the Houthi attacks "put civilian lives at risks and must stop." Foreign secretary Liz Truss condemned the attack as "abhorrent" and urged an "immediate halt to the violence."
- United States: U.S. Secretary of State Antony Blinken condemned the attack, stating "At a time when the parties should be focused on de-escalation and bringing needed life-saving relief to the Yemeni people ahead of the holy month of Ramadan, the Houthis continue their destructive behavior and reckless terrorist attacks striking civilian infrastructure." U.S. National Security advisor Jake Sullivan condemned the "unprovoked Houthi attacks" as "acts of terrorism aimed to prolong the suffering of the Yemeni people." He also accused Iran of facilitating the Houthis' actions by supplying weapons, stating the attacks "were clearly enabled by Iran in violation of UN Security Council resolutions prohibiting the import of weapons into Yemen."
