= Timeline of the Yemeni humanitarian crisis =

The following is a timeline of the Yemeni humanitarian crisis, ongoing since the mid-2010s.

== 2015 ==
=== March ===
On 26 March, Interior Ministry officials linked to Ansar Allah documented that 23 civilians had been killed and 24 wounded. Among the dead were 5 children, ages 2 to 13, 6 women and an elderly man. The wounded included 12 children, ages 3 to 8, and 2 women due to airstrike against Sanaʽa particularly in Bani Hawat, a predominantly Houthi neighborhood near Sanaa's airports and al-Nasr, near the presidential palace. HRW documented the deaths of 11 civilians, including 2 women and 2 children, other than those provided by the Yemeni officials along with 14 more wounded, including 3 children and 1 woman. According to AI, that bombing destroyed at least 14 homes in Bani Hawat.

On 31 March, OCHA reported that 13 of 22 Governorates were affected and highlighted infrastructure effects that detailed coalition bombing of a refugee camp that killed 29 and injured 40. Fuel shortages in the south threatened water access to citizens and in Lahj, electricity and water services had not been functioning for several days. Later that day, AI reported that at least six civilians, including four children, were burned to death as a result of an airstrike. It reported that two fuel stations were destroyed. In al-Kadima area in al-Kita, several passengers were killed in a car that had stopped to refuel and a worker was injured. The third strike, apparently aimed at a passing fuel tanker, set fire to at least three civilian homes. AI then stated that "it is becoming increasingly apparent that the Saudi Arabian–led coalition is turning a blind eye to civilian deaths and suffering caused by its military intervention."

=== April ===
On 17 April, OCHA reported on the increasing deterioration of the humanitarian situation, reporting airstrikes hitting in Saada City a water tank, the electricity station, a petrol station, a plastics processing factory, a shopping centre and a housing complex. Several days earlier, airstrikes had hit private homes, the post office, a community centre, government offices, markets and vehicles. Local partners estimated about 50 dead within the past week. In Sanaʽa residential neighborhoods near Assir, Ayban and Faj Attan were affected due to their proximity to military camps. In Amran, airstrikes hit a petrol station, an educational institute and a bridge. According to local reports, a local water corporation in Hajjah (Abbs District) was hit. The report also stated that civilian casualties were under-reported as families without access to hospitals bury their members at home.

On 20 April coalition airstrikes hit the Fajj Atan military base, causing a large explosion that killed 38 civilians and injured over 500. The airstrike also targeted the office of Yemen Today, a TV network owned by Ali Abdullah Saleh, killing three and injuring other workers. An eyewitness reported that emergency rooms were overwhelmed. The head of the ICRC in Yemen later clarified that 90 people had died during this attack.

On 21 April the BBC reported a warning from the UN about worsening health services and a dire need for medicines.

On 24 April UNICEF released a report stating that since the start of the military intervention, 115 children had been killed, with at least 64 from aerial bombardment. The F-15's of Saudi Arabia often strike militia holdouts that miss and hit shelters the homeless and houses.

According to OCHA's fifth report, released on 26 April, humanitarian operations would come to a complete halt within two weeks and hospitals in both Sanaa and Aden would close completely due to the lack of fuel. The lack of fuel affected water supplies. Markets in affected governorates are not able to provide food, with wheat grain and flour prices rising by 42% and 44%, respectively. The healthcare system faced an imminent collapse with hospitals struggling to operate due to lack of medicines and supplies. Essential medicine prices increased by 300%.

Casualties from 19 March to 22 April reached 1,080 (28 children and 48 women) and 4,352 wounded (80 children and 143 women). According to the WFP, 12 million people were food insecure, a 13% rise.

On 29 April OCHA reported that airstrikes hit SIA on 28 April, damaging the runway and hampering aid deliveries. Airstrikes were also reported at Al Hudayda Airport and Saada. Widespread internet and phone disruptions were reported in several governorates due to the lack of fuel and electricity. On 25 April, the Yemen Public Telecommunications Corporation warned that unless the fuel crisis was resolved, telecommunication services (mobile phones, internet, and land lines) would shut down within a week. The disruption in communication was affecting information flow on humanitarian needs and operations. On 29 April, Haradh was heavily bombarded, including areas near the main hospital. Food distribution and aid would reportedly stop within a week if additional fuel could not be obtained. As of 29 April the Al Hudaydah Governorate ran out of fuel and aid operations could not be completed.

On 30 April OCHA's Flash Update 22 reported that airstrikes hit the only main roads that connect the Sanaʽa Governorate with Ibb. It also indicated that over 3,410 people from Yemen had arrived in Somalia since the fighting escalated, with 2,285 arrivals registered in Puntland and 1,125 registered in the Somaliland. A further 8,900 migrants were registered in Djibouti, 4,700 of whom were third country nationals.

=== May ===
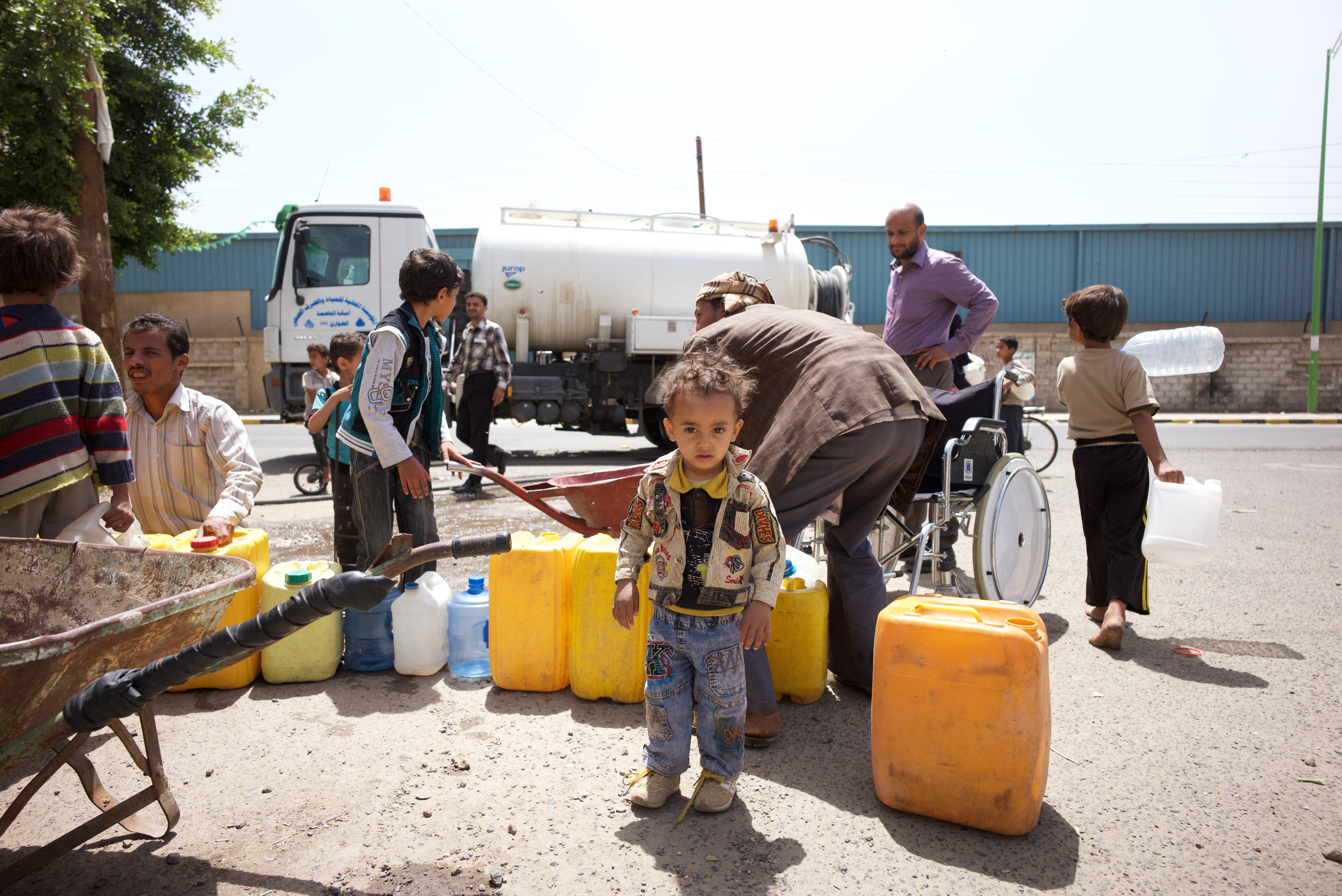
The conflict is exacerbating Yemen's water scarcity, Sanaa, 21 May 2015

On 4 May coalition airstrikes hit SIA, destroying a cargo ship and other planes used to transport food and supplies. OCHA reported that several airstrikes hit the Al Hudayda airport and surrounding areas in Al Hudayda City. In Aden, the districts of Craiter and Al-Muala were without electricity, water and telecommunication for over a week according to residents. That same day, Johannes van der Klaauw, OCHA's Humanitarian Coordinator for Yemen, urged the coalition to stop targeting Sana'a International Airport and to preserve airports and seaports so that humanitarian aid could reach people affected by the conflict.

On 5 May, a UN spokesperson emphasized the effects on persons with disabilities stating that over 3,000,000 people with disabilities could not meet their basic needs. The conflict forced more than 300 centres to close. She added that they were especially concerned about an airstrike that targeted a military field hospital.

On 6 May, the OCHA reported lack of fuel to support humanitarian operations beyond one week, with fuel and food prices continuing to increase. The World Food Programme declared that shortages of fuel has changed to a serious threat for hospitals and food supplies. Edward Santiago, country director for Save the Children, said in statement a short time ceasefire is not enough to allow for humanitarian supplies.

On 7 May, trade sources stated that merchant ships had been delayed weeks Yemen and in one case, following inspection and approval, a food supply ship was denied access. The food crisis increased to include over 20 million people (80% of the population) going hungry. Airstrikes destroyed a mine factory and a communications center. Local sources reported that 13 villagers were killed due to shelling near the border.

On 18 May, HRW documented airstrikes that hit homes and markets and killed and wounded civilians. HRW documented the bombing of four markets.

On 21 May, OCHA reported airstrikes that hit two farms adjacent to a humanitarian facility in Hajjah Governorate and resulted in civilian casualties. A warehouse containing humanitarian supplies was damaged in another strike. In Sa'adah City, satellite imagery analysis identified widespread damage to infrastructure with 1,171 structures affected, damaged or destroyed. The analysis showed that as of 17 May, 35 impact craters existed within the city, mostly along the runway of Sa'ada airport. Similar imagery of Aden identified 642 affected structures, including 327 destroyed. Local partners reported that 674 schools were forced to close in Sanaʽa, affecting 551,000 students.

Fuel prices increased by over 500% and food supplies by 80% since 26 March. The continued restrictions on the arrival of goods via air and sea ports, and insecurity on roads, restricted the delivery of essential supplies. In Sanaʽa, security concerns due to airstrikes prevented delivery of food assistance.

On 21 May, five Ethiopian migrants were killed and two others injured in an airstrike that hit open space 500 metres from an IOM-managed Migrant Response Centre. With continued conflict and import restrictions, Emergency (IPC Phase 4) outcomes were likely in the coming month. In six governorates, reports from OCHA partners show that basic food items are no longer available (Aden, Abyan, Al Dhale'e, Al Bayda, Lahj, Sa'ada).

=== June–August ===
On 3 June, The Operations Room of the Ministry of Health in Sanaʽa was damaged. It manages emergency operations nationwide.

On 5 June, The Washington Post reported that several Yemeni cultural and heritage strikes had been repeatedly targeted by Saudi airstrikes. Reports stated that Al-Qahira Castle, the 1,200-year-old al-Hadi Mosque and Dhamar Museum with over 12,500 artifacts were destroyed and the Great Dam of Marib was hit.

On 17 June, an OCHA report highlighted that food security had continued to worsen, with 19 out of 22 governorates now classified 'crisis' or 'emergency'. Half the population was 'food insecure' and nearly a quarter 'severely food insecure. A joint analysis of household food security by the UN Food and Agriculture Organization (FAO) WFP and the Ministry of Planning and International Cooperation in Yemen (MoPIC) found that Yemen was sliding into catastrophe. More than six million Yemenis were then in a Phase 4 Emergency, and nearly 6.9 million people are in a Phase 3 Crisis: These figures indicate that Yemen was approaching a complete breakdown in food security and health.

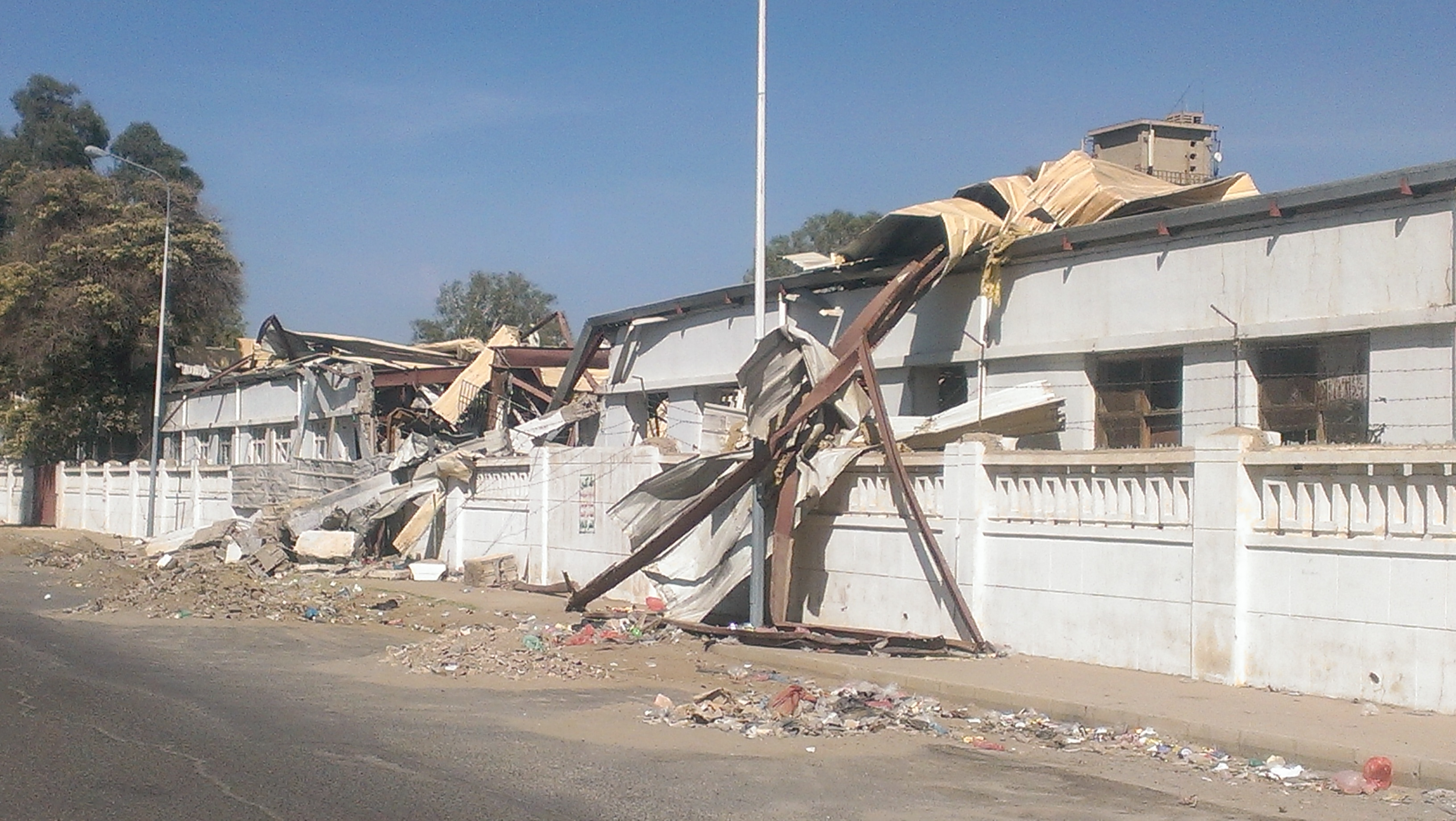
An airstrike in Sanaʽa on a textile factory in July 2015 left more than 1,300 people unemployed (photo: A. Mojalli/VOA, November 2015)

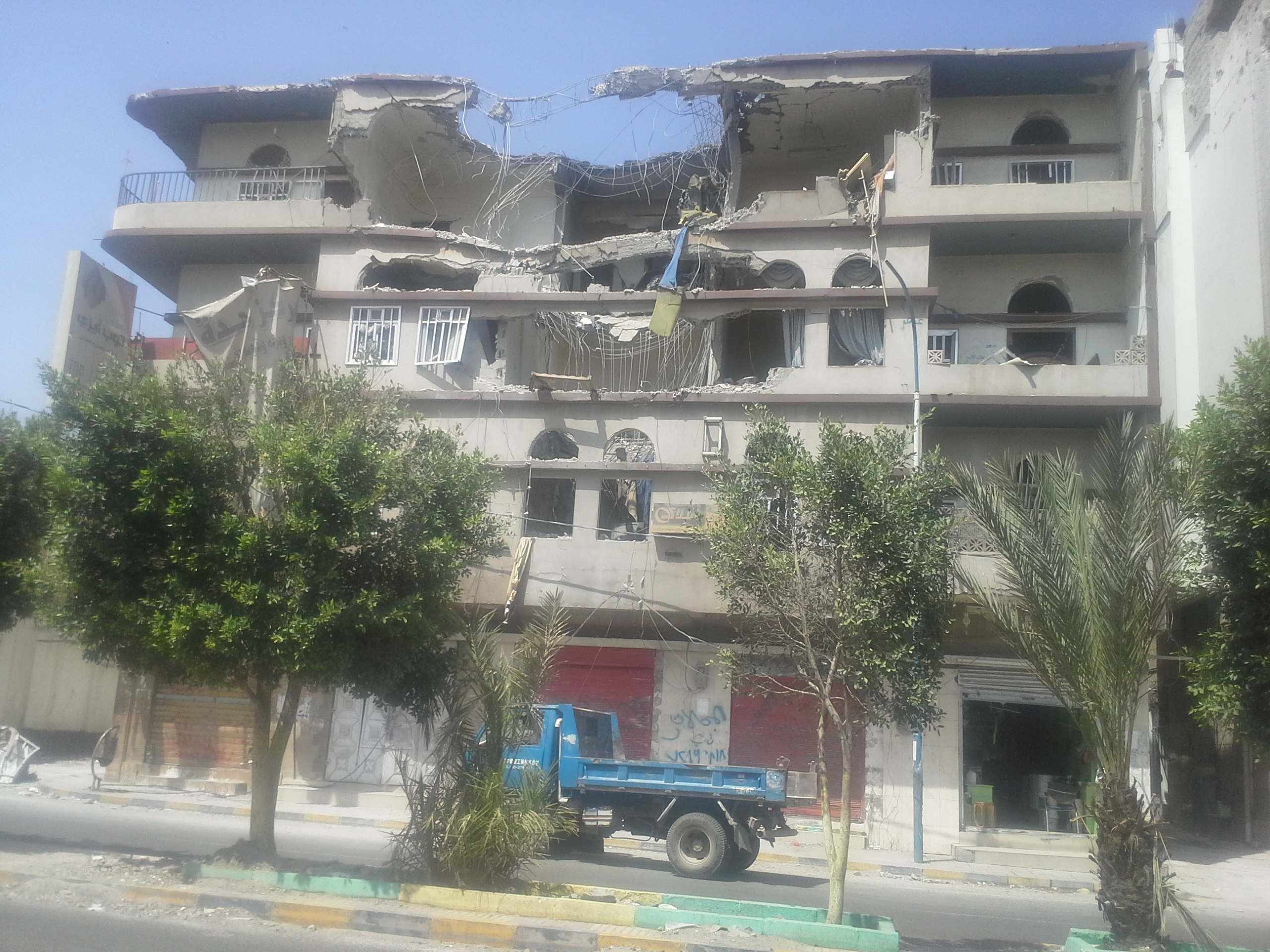
Apartment building destroyed by a strike in Sanaa on 5 September 2015

On 26 July, the OCHA announced that airstrikes hit the residential complex of the Al Mukha Power Station in Al Mukha District, Taiz Governorate with health facilities reporting 55 deaths and 96 injuries and media reports as high as 120, all civilians.

On 27 August, the OCHA announced that airstrikes targeting that Al-Hudaydah port facilities late on 17 August and early 18 August had brought the port activities to a near halt and that the port was empty of all vessels and remained non-operational. A UN-chartered aid vessel carrying 2,230 MT of mixed food commodities left the port and was rerouted to Djibouti.

== 2016 ==
On 5 January 2016, an airstrike by the Saudi-led military coalition hit the Al Noor Center for Care and Rehabilitation of Blind, in the Safiah district of Sanaʽa, the capital's only center, school, and home for people with visual disabilities. Five people were injured. Human Rights Watch and media reported, if the bomb had exploded, the damage would have been much worse. Human Rights Watch blamed both the Saudi-led coalition for hitting civilian targets and the Houthi militants battling the coalition. HRW said Houthi militants were partially to blame for using civilian sites for military purposes. Armed Houthis were stationed near the Al Noor center, putting the students at risk.

On 20 April 2016 the UN General Assembly Security Council in a report covering the period January to December 2015 "verified a sixfold increase in the number of children killed and maimed compared with 2014, totalling 1,953 child casualties (785 children killed and 1,168 injured). More than 70 per cent were boys. Of the casualties, 60 per cent (510 deaths and 667 injuries) were attributed to the Saudi Arabia-led coalition."

On 8 October 2016, airstrikes by Saudi-led coalition force kill 140 people and injuring 500 persons in one of the single worst death tolls in the two-year war. There are coalitions between Saudi Arabia and his allies in the subject. Also, the United Kingdom is under pressure for exporting Lucrative Arms and weapons to Saudi Arabia.

== 2018 ==
On 2 August 2018, The New York Times reported that at least 30 people were killed when the Saudi-led coalition air force hit a fish market, the entrance to the main hospital and a security compound.

On 9 August 2018, a Saudi airstrike in Dahyan hit a school bus causing approximately 51 deaths. Many of these deaths were schoolchildren and other civilians.

== 2019 ==
On 8 October 2019, Yemen made an agreement to hand over Aden to Saudi Arabia.

== 2020 ==
On 7 February 2020, Yemeni hospitals were attacked, leaving more than thousands of civilians in need of immediate medical attention followed by a disrupted healthcare facility. The attack was a result of clashes between warring parties of Yemen; Saudi Arabian–led intervention in Yemen and Houthis.

== Specific areas ==
=== Saada ===
Saada was the governorate of origin of 500,794 IDPs (out of 2,509,068 in total) as of December 2015.

On 18 April, an airstrike in Saada hit an Oxfam warehouse, damaging humanitarian supplies and killing at least one civilian. Aid groups widely condemned the strike.

On 8 and 9 May 2015, large-scale displacement was reported in Saada to neighbouring areas, after the Saudi-led military coalition declared the entire Saada governorate a "military zone" and started heavy airstrikes. Around 70,000 people, including 28,000 children, fled from the Governorate of Sa'ada. The Save the Children's Country Director in Yemen, Edward Santiago, said that many more were "largely unable to flee for safety because of the de facto blockade imposed by the coalition leading to severe fuel shortages". On 9 May 2015, the U.N. Humanitarian Coordinator for Yemen, Johannes van der Klaauw, condemned the air strikes on Saada city as being in breach of international humanitarian law.

In August 2015 the Agency for Technical Cooperation and Development (ACTED) reported that "the crisis has taken an immeasurably heavy toll on civilians in this poor, rural governorate, causing death, injury and frequent damage and destruction of infrastructure."

In January 2016 the Houthi-controlled Saada area, including medical facilities run by Médecins Sans Frontières (MSF), received almost daily attacks. Michael Seawright, a Saada-based MSF project coordinator, said that they treated a high number of casualties, many with severe injuries. The Shiara hospital in Razeh District in Saada City, the only hospital with a trauma centre in the governorate of Saada and in most of northern Yemen, was hit on 10 January, and several people were killed, including medical personnel. MSF had been working in the facility since November 2015.

=== Sanaʽa ===
457.502 IDPs (out of 2,509,068 in total) originated from Sanaʽa Governorate and Sanaʽa city as of December 2015.

After the Old City of Sanaʽa was heavily bombed in May 2015, causing severe damage to many of its historic buildings, Director-General of UNESCO, Irina Bokova, said "I am particularly distressed by the news concerning air strikes on heavily populated areas such as the cities of Sanaʽa and Saa'dah."

Following a surge in aerial bombing raids in the Old City of Sanaʽa in June 2015, the UN warned, that the country's extensive archaeological and historic heritage had been increasingly under threat. In July 2015, the Old City of Sanaʽa, which had sustained serious damage due to armed conflict, was added to List of World Heritage in Danger.

On 6 September 2015, Al Sabaeen paediatric hospital in Sanaʽa had to be evacuated after a nearby airstrike. The United Nations' Office for the Coordination of Humanitarian Affairs (UN-OCHA) described the event as "a severe blow to a tattered health system". Before its closure the Al Sabaeen paediatric hospital—standing amid bombed out buildings in the center of Sanaʽa—had been the primary paediatric hospital in the area. "Before the crisis it had a catchment population of about 300,000; but, since the crisis that number has risen to almost 3 million, with the entire governorate reliant on it for specialist care," said Save the Children spokesperson Mark Kaye.

A joint report by the UK-based charity Action on Armed Violence (AOAV) and the UN-OCHA, that concluded that airstrikes were responsible for 60 percent of civilian casualties in the first seven months of 2015, came to the result, that more than half (53 per cent) of the reported civilian toll was recorded in Sanaʽa and surrounding districts.

On 7 January 2016, HRW reported and condemned that the Saudi Arabia-led coalition forces had used cluster bombs on residential areas of Sanaa on 6 January. On 8 January the United Nations warned that their use could be a war crime. The UN Secretary-General Ban Ki-moon said he was "particularly concerned about reports of intense airstrikes in residential areas and on civilian buildings in Sanaʽa, including the Chamber of Commerce, a wedding hall and a centre for the blind".

== See also ==
- Outline of the Yemeni crisis, revolution, and civil war (2011–present)
- Timeline of the Yemeni crisis (2011–present)
