= September 2015 Sanaa mosque bombing =

Suicide attack in Yemeni capital

Sanaa (Yemen)

On 24 September 2015, a double suicide bombing was carried out by Islamic State at a mosque in Sana'a, Yemen, killing at least 25 people.

== Background ==
Many insurgent attacks have occurred in Yemen since its crisis began in January 2011, and even more so since its civil war began in September 2014. The Houthi movement, who began its insurgency in 2004, seized the country's capital city Sana'a in September 2014 and has occupied it ever since. In March 2015, 142 people were killed by Islamic State suicide bombers at two Shia mosques in Sana'a.

== Bombing ==
During the morning of 24 September 2015, a suicide bomber detonated a bomb during prayers for Eid-al-Adha, in Balili mosque, a Shiite mosque in Sana'a. As worshippers who had survived the explosion tried to escape, a suicide bomber detonated an explosive belt at the mosque's entrance. At least 25 people were killed and at least 36 others wounded. Later the same day, Islamic State said they carried out the bombing.

== See also ==
- List of massacres in Yemen
