= 2015 Mokha airstrikes =

2015 event in the Yemeni Civil War

Mokha airstrikes
- Mokha (Yemen)
- Date: 24 July 2015
- Duration: 0:30:00
- Location: Mokha, Yemen; 13°20′57″N 43°15′04″E
- Type: Airstrike
- Target: Civilian residential compound of Mokha power plant
- Deaths: 65 – 120 (including 10 children)
- Injuries: 150
- Accused: Saudi-led coalition

On 24 July 2015, between 9:30 and 10:00 p.m., the city of Mokha, Yemen, was bombed by the Saudi-led coalition. The airstrikes struck two worker housing complexes for engineers and technicians at the Mokha steam power plant. The attack left between 65 and 120 dead, including at least 10 children.

According to the workers and residents of the compound, at least one aircraft dropped nine bombs in separate sorties in intervals of a few minutes. The United Nations said that at least 36 buildings – including schools, hospitals, court houses, communications institutions, and power generation facilities – were damaged or destroyed.

Mokha, a city on the coast of the Red Sea, was previously considered to be one of the safest cities during the war in Yemen. The attack was one of the deadliest attacks by Saudi Arabia against Yemen. The attack was condemned by Human Rights Watch, who investigated the scene the day after the attack, saying that the airstrike was unlawful because there was "no evident military target." Yemeni officials, speaking on the condition of anonymity, said that the distance between the attacked buildings and the closest Houthi outpost was about three miles. A military official stated that "incorrect coordinates" were given to the Saudi Arabia-led coalition.

== Background ==
On 26 March 2015, Saudi Arabia led a coalition of nine Arab states in carrying out airstrikes in Yemen. The intervention was claimed to be a response to a request for assistance from Abd Rabbuh Mansur Hadi, the then-President of Yemen. He immediately left the country for Saudi Arabia after the military intervention started. The Saudi-led coalition has performed military operations against Houthi militia and loyalists of Ali Abdullah Saleh, former Yemeni president.

The UN said that between 26 March 2015 and the Mokha bombing, at least 1,693 civilians were killed in the fighting and 3,829 were wounded. The International Committee of the Red Cross said that "under international humanitarian law, all countries and parties involved in conflict must distinguish between military and civilian objects, and uphold the principles of proportionality and precaution."

== Bombing ==
The airstrike hit two compounds in the residential area of the Mokha steam power plant that housed workers. Many of the workers had relatives there who had traveled for the Eid al-Fitr celebration, which was held on 18 July 2015 and marked the end of Ramadan. According to security officials and eyewitnesses, the strikes in the area continued into Saturday while dozens of families fled the area.

== Casualties ==
Reports of casualties vary, ranging from "65 dead and dozens wounded", according to Human Rights Watch, to "120 dead and 150 wounded", according to US news outlets. The airstrike was criticized by Human Rights Watch and various media outlets due to its targeting of a residential complex.

Videos posted on social media appeared to show terrified bystanders rushing for shelter during the attack, as well as a significant number of people killed and seriously injured afterward. The officials said the attack razed some of the buildings.

== Aftermath ==
The attack increased worries that Saudi military operations were starting to target civilians in addition to military targets. According to Yemeni officials, the distance between the struck block and the closest Houthi outpost is about three miles. By 2016, it was labeled as the second-deadliest attack by the Saudi campaign. Human Rights Watch stated that the airstrike was a war crime, and Ole Solvang, speaking for the organization, said, "Again and again, we see coalition airstrikes killing large numbers of civilians, but no signs of any investigation into possible violations."

HRW added that "with no evident military target, this attack appears to be a war crime." HRW stated that it visited the site of the incident on 26 July and did not find any signs indicating that the compounds were being used for military purposes. According to the HRW report, two apartment complexes had their roofs partially collapsed as a result of direct bombing. Many of the buildings' external walls were torn off by further explosives that detonated between the buildings, including in the main courtyard, "leaving only the load-bearing pillars standing."

One neighbor who witnessed the scene after the attack compared the situation to a scene from Judgement Day, saying that "corpses and heads" were spread around and "engulfed by fire and ashes." Another nearby resident told Amnesty International that the memories of passing by "pools of blood and severed limbs" of more than 20 victims still troubled him nearly a month after the attack.

According to plant employees, the military facility site that Human Rights Watch identified 100 m (330 ft) southeast of the company's main campus was actually a military air defense base. The staff at the plant said that it had been vacant for months. A military official who spoke on the condition of anonymity said that "the coalition had been given incorrect coordinates" and that the coordinates had not come from "anyone in the district".

Days after the strike, the Saudi-led coalition battling Houthi rebels in Yemen announced a five-day ceasefire. According to the statement by the Saudi state media, the ceasefire was made at the request of Abed Rabbuh Mansur Hadi to Saudi Arabia's King Salman. The coalition said that it would respond to attacks or movements by Houthis or their allies during the ceasefire.

== See also ==
- Saudi-led intervention in the Yemeni civil war
- Al-Qaeda insurgency in Yemen
- Yemeni civil war (2014–present)
