= Famine in Yemen (2016–present) =

Famine in Yemen المجاعة في اليمن
- Country: Yemen
- Period: 2016–present
- Total deaths: Unknown: 223,000+ deaths from both "hunger and preventable diseases" by the end of 2021, per a UN Development Program estimate, with most of the victims being children under five years of age.; More than 90,000 children by 2018
- Causes: Yemeni civil war (2014–present); Saudi Arabian–led intervention in Yemen; Blockade of Yemen; Cultivation and consumption of khat; Devastation of Yemeni infrastructure by the Saudi-led coalition bombing; Confiscation of food by Houthi rebels
- Consequences: 17.4-19 million people suffering food insecurity; cholera outbreak

Since 2016, a food insecurity crisis has been ongoing in Yemen which began during the Yemeni civil war. The UN estimates that the war has caused an estimated 130,000 deaths from indirect causes which include lack of food, health services, and infrastructure as of December 2020.

In 2018, Save the Children estimated that 85,000 children have died due to starvation in the three years prior. In May 2020, UNICEF described Yemen as "the largest humanitarian crisis in the world". And estimated that 80% of the population – over 24 million people – were in need of humanitarian assistance.

In September 2022, the World Food Programme estimated that 17.4 million Yemenis struggled with food insecurity, and projected that number would increase to 19 million by the end of the year, describing this level of hunger as "unprecedented."

The crisis is being compounded by an outbreak of cholera, which resulted in over 3000 deaths between 2015 and mid 2017. While the country is in crisis and multiple regions have been classified as being in IPC Phase 4 (humanitarian emergency), an actual classification of famine conditions was averted in 2018 and again in early 2019 due to international relief efforts.

In January 2021, two out of 33 regions were classified as IPC 4 (humanitarian emergency) while 26 were classified as IPC 3 (acute crisis).

The main cause of the crisis is the ongoing Yemeni civil war. Aid often cannot effectively reach the population because of the ongoing civil war and the blockade of Yemen by Saudi Arabia which started in 2015. The blockade was intensified in November 2017 with the closure of all sea and land ports and then partially lifted at the end of the month when some humanitarian supplies were allowed into the country.

According to the 2019 Global Hunger Index, Yemen has the second-highest hunger score in the world, after the Central African Republic, with a slight worsening since 2000 (increase from 43.2 to 45.9).

For 2020, GHI estimates that the prevalence of wasting in children under 5 has increased from 13.3% to 15.5% and the prevalence of stunting has increased from 46.6% to 53.2% while overall child mortality has slightly decreased in the period of the civil war (compared to 2010).

== Background ==
Since its unification in 1990, Yemen has been one of the poorest countries in the region. As the cost of local food production was high, it also became dependent on food imports. As global food prices spiked in 2008, this led to food insecurity and food riots. Prior to the civil war, Yemen was already the most vulnerable country in the Middle East, ranking highly among the world's most malnourished, with 50 percent of its population living in impoverished conditions with limited access to safe water.

In 2014, a fight between government forces and Houthi-led insurgents led to a full-scale civil war. Iran's government offered military support to the Houthis, leading to the seizure of Yemen's capital Sanaa. President Abd Rabbu Mansour was forced to resign together with his government officials. Towards the beginning of March of the same year, the United States and Saudi Arabia implemented a series of economic sanctions and a Saudi-led coalition began airstrikes against the Houthi rebels. In the following years, the Houthis began attacking oil transports, imposing an effective embargo on oil exports.

These sanctions and ongoing war greatly diminished the domestic economy and destroyed national infrastructure. The war also affected civilians severely, displacing over four million residents, and leaving over 68 percent of people in serious need of humanitarian assistance.

== Causes ==
=== Saudi Arabian-led intervention ===
The famine is the direct result of the Saudi Arabian-led intervention in Yemen and blockade. Yemen was already the most impoverished nation in the Arabian Peninsula and the Middle East, and Al Hudaydah one of the poorest cities of Yemen, but the war and the naval blockade by the Saudi-led coalition made the situation much worse. Fishing boats, the main livelihood of Al Hudaydah's residents, were destroyed by Saudi airstrikes, leaving them without any means to provide for their families. As a result, one child dies every ten minutes on average. A UN panel of experts found that Saudi Arabia is purposefully obstructing the delivery of humanitarian aid into Yemen.

Saudi Arabia was reported to be deliberately targeting means of food production and distribution in Yemen by bombing farms, fishing boats, ports, food storages, food factories, and other businesses in order to exacerbate famine. These actions led to the UN accusing the Saudi-led coalition of committing war crimes and having a "complete disregard for human life". 1,500 schools were damaged and destroyed during Yemeni Civil War. After Saudi-backed Hadi's forces retook Mocha from Houthis they barred fishermen from working. The Union of Yemeni fishermen accused the coalition of waging war against fishermen.

U.S. Senator Chris Murphy accused the United States of complicity in Yemen's humanitarian crisis: "Thousands and thousands inside Yemen today are dying. (...) This horror is caused in part by our decision to facilitate a bombing campaign that is murdering children and to endorse a Saudi strategy inside Yemen that is deliberately using disease and starvation and the withdrawal of humanitarian support as a tactic."

The British researcher Alex de Waal has considered the famine in Yemen as

The world's worst since North Korea in the 1990s and the one in which Western responsibility is clearest... Britain has sold at least £4.5 billion in arms to Saudi Arabia and £500 million to the UAE since the war began. The US role is even bigger: Trump authorized arms sales to the Saudis worth $110 billion last May. Yemen will be the defining famine crime of this generation, perhaps this century.

Doctors Without Borders (MSF) has been assisting victims of the famine and the cholera outbreak, as well as providing mental health assistance to those who have been affected by the war.

=== Houthi food confiscation ===
Houthi rebels have been accused of unlawfully confiscating food and medicine from civilians under their control by organizations including Human Rights Watch (HRW), MSF, and the World Food Programme (WFP), with a WFP survey finding that food aid was not reaching the majority of those eligible to receive it in Houthi–held Sanaa and Saada.

== History ==
=== 2016 ===
Abd Rabbuh Mansour Hadi's decision to relocate the Central Bank of Yemen to Aden in September 2016 was reported to have exacerbated the vulnerable living conditions of the population. The move "was aimed primarily at disabling the Houthi-Saleh administered bureaucracy based in Sanaa. Instead, it provoked a severe liquidity crisis that has fueled famine, as somewhere between 8.5 million and 10 million Yemenis rely on public sector salaries that have been unpaid for more than a year."

Sana'a Centre for Strategical Studies recorded that the banking crisis in fact began in early 2010 when American banks began closing the accounts of Yemeni banks, and with the start of the conflict in 2011, as Yemen came under UN Chapter 7 jurisdiction. "Large European and American banks ceased to interact with Yemeni banks completely. Yemeni banks became both unable to honor customer requests to withdraw cash – leading to further hoarding outside the banking system – and had no domestic currency to deposit at the Central Bank of Yemen. These multiple, interrelated and mutually reinforcing factors helped instigate a severe public sector cash liquidity crisis in mid-2016."

=== 2017 ===
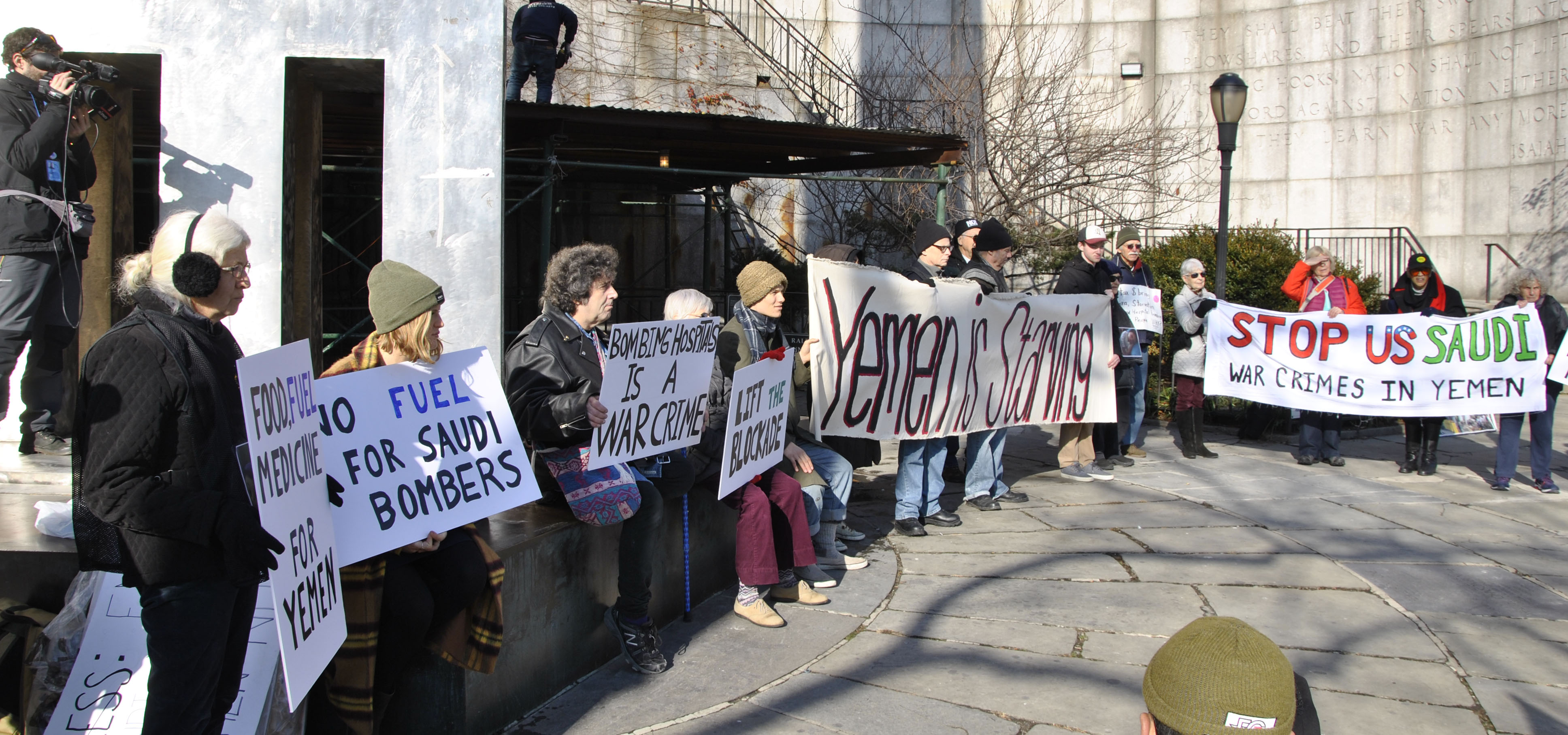
Protest against U.S. involvement in the military intervention in Yemen, New York City, 2017

More than 50,000 children in Yemen died from starvation during 2017.

On 5 November 2017, the Saudi-led coalition began blocking all fuel shipments to Yemen, causing farmers to abandon modern equipment like tractors and forcing hospitals to function without generators.

On 11 December 2017, Jamie McGoldrick, the UN's humanitarian coordinator for Yemen, affirmed that 8 million in the country are in danger of famine unless access to immediate humanitarian aid is allowed. On 13 December 2017, USAID administrator, Mark Andrew Green, stated that there are no signs that the blockade had been in any way eased and Yemeni ports are still fully blocked.

According to The Economist, another major cause of the famine is the popularity of the cultivation and consumption of khat, which requires a significant amount of water to grow in addition to being the most popular drug in Yemen. Khat cultivation is monopolised by the Houthi rebels.

=== 2018 ===
In July 2018, a 25% increase in severe hunger cases in Yemen compared to 2017 was reported.

In a September 2018 column in The New York Times, Nicholas Kristof stated that the United States is supporting crimes against humanity in Yemen, adding that: "America is helping to kill, maim and starve Yemeni children. At least eight million Yemenis are at risk of starvation from an approaching famine caused not by crop failures but by our actions and those of our allies. The United Nations has called it the world's worst humanitarian crisis, and we own it."

In October 2018, World Peace Foundation released a report documenting systematic targeting and destruction of food production and distribution infrastructure in Yemen by the Saudi-led coalition.

On 31 October 2018, the United States and the United Kingdom, Saudi Arabia's biggest arm suppliers, called for a ceasefire in the conflict in Yemen. A press release from the United States Secretary of State, Michael Pompeo, stated: "A cessation of hostilities and vigorous resumption of a political track will help ease the humanitarian crisis as well. It is time to end this conflict, replace conflict with compromise, and allow the Yemeni people to heal through peace and reconstruction." On 10 November 2018, the U.S. announced it would no longer refuel coalition aircraft operating over Yemen. The U.S. continues its backing of the Saudi-led intervention with weapons sales and intelligence sharing.

In November 2018, according to a report by The New York Times, 1.8 million children in Yemen were severely malnourished.

=== 2019 ===
On 3 August 2019, a United Nations report said the US, UK and France may be complicit in committing war crimes in Yemen by selling weapons and providing support to the Saudi-led coalition which is using the starvation of civilians as a tactic of warfare.

Famine was averted in 2019, as support from donor governments saw the World Food Programme scale up to support increasing needs, going from supporting around 1 million people in 2015 to nearly 13 million in 2019. It was one of the largest humanitarian scale-ups in recent history.

=== 2020 ===
As of March 2020, UNICEF estimates that 2 million children under the age of 5 suffer from acute malnutrition and require treatment.

According to a report by the Food and Agriculture Organization (FAO), UNICEF, and the World Food Programme (WFP) and partners, 40% of Yemen's population was expected to suffer from acute food insecurity because of the war, flood, coronavirus, and locust swarms, by the end of 2020. Within 6 months "high levels of acute food insecurity" was estimated to increase from 2 million to 3.2 million, even if the food aid was maintained.

=== 2021 ===
The World Food Programme (WFP) projected in March 2021 that if the Saudi-led blockade and war continues, more than 400,000 Yemeni children under 5 years old could die from acute malnutrition before the end of the year as the blockade devastates the nation.

The UN estimated that by the end of 2021, the conflict in Yemen had claimed more than 377,000 lives, with 60% of them the result of hunger, disease and lack of healthcare facilities.

=== 2022 ===
In March 2022, the UN Resident and Humanitarian Coordinator called for humanitarian assistance and protection of millions of people with essential services. At the June 2022 Yemen Senior Officials Meeting (SOM) meeting, stakeholders recognized the protection programming is only at 36.9 percent of the available 47.2 percent fund.

In September 2022, the scale of food insecurity affecting 17.4 million Yemenis was reported, with projections indicating that 19 million people could be at risk of famine by December 2022. This underscored the persistently high malnutrition rates among women and children in Yemen, which remain among the highest in the world. An estimated 1.3 million pregnant or lactating women and 2.2 million children under the age of five required treatment for acute malnutrition.

In December 2022, the World Food Program (WFP) published Yemenis Emergency needs with 23.5 million people lacking humanitarian assistance. WFP also reported that 17 million people are food insecure, and 3.5 million pregnant or breastfeeding women and children under 5 are exposed to acute malnutrition, which is much higher than the September 2022 predicted needs.

=== 2023 ===
In 2023, Yemen continued to face a humanitarian crisis, with two-thirds of its population, approximately 21.6 million people, requiring humanitarian assistance and protection services. This ongoing need stemmed from protracted war, economic collapse, displacement, and recurrent natural disasters. Despite a slight decrease from 23.4 million people in need in 2022 to 21.6 million in 2023, the situation remained critically severe. The UN's humanitarian affairs office, OCHA, sought $4.3 billion to support the 17.3 million most vulnerable individuals. Key strategic objectives for the year included promoting life-saving activities, enhancing resilience, and ensuring protection for the affected populations.

=== 2024 ===
Yemen's humanitarian and development agencies focused on incorporating climate resilience into their interventions, recognizing the growing impact of climate change on the already vulnerable country. The Food Security and Agriculture Cluster aimed to secure and improve food access for vulnerable households through a $1.36 billion plan, reaching 12.8 million people. The health sector faced a significant funding shortfall, exacerbating challenges such as cholera outbreaks and malnutrition's medical side effects. Efforts to improve access to clean water, sanitation, health services, and renewable energy sources in health facilities were critical priorities. In addition, support for livelihood development and cash-based interventions continued to be vital for fostering economic stability and self-sufficiency among Yemenis.

=== 2025 ===
The World Food Programme (WFP) reports that 19.5 million people need humanitarian assistance and 17.1 million people are food insecure. As of today the WFP supplies much of the logistics capacity for the humanitarian response in Yemen, supporting other UN agencies and NGOs. WFP provides cash assistance in southern Yemen in areas where markets are stable enough to meet communities’ basic food needs. WFP also provides specialized nutritious food to young children and pregnant and breastfeeding women suffering from moderate acute malnutrition.

== See also ==
- Health in Yemen
- Outline of the Yemeni crisis, revolution, and civil war (2011–present)
- Timeline of the Yemeni crisis (2011–present)
- Airstrikes on Yemen
- Destruction of Yemeni cultural heritage by Saudi-led coalition
- Famine in northern Ethiopia (2020–present)
- Water supply and sanitation in Yemen
- Gaza Strip famine
- 2025 hunger crisis in Syria
