= 2021 Aden bombings =

Car bombings in Yemen

- Part of the Yemeni Civil War (2014–present)
- Location: 12°49′32″N 45°02′11″E; Aden, Aden Governorate, Yemen
- Date: 10 and 30 October 2021
- Attack type: Car bombs
- Deaths: 18

Two car bombings occurred in Aden, Yemen, in October 2021.

On 10 October 2021, a car bombing in Aden, Yemen, killed six people and wounded seven others. The state news agency said the bomb was a terrorist assassination attempt which targeted the Governor of Aden Ahmed Lamlas and agriculture minister Salem al-Suqatri.

On 30 October 2021, a car bombing near Aden International Airport killed at least 12 civilians and injured several others. Prime Minister Mueeen Abdulmalek Saeed described it as a terrorist bombing.

== See also ==
- 2015 Aden car bombing
- 2016 Aden car bombing
- 2020 Aden airport attack
