= United Nations Security Council Resolution 2564 =

UN Security Council Resolution 2564
- Flag of Yemen
- Date: 25 February 2021
- Code: S/RES/2564
- Subject: Yemen
- Voting summary: 14 voted for; None voted against; 1 abstained
- Result: Adopted

Security Council composition
- Permanent members: China; France; Russia; United Kingdom; United States
- Non-permanent members: Estonia; India; Ireland; Kenya; Mexico; Niger; Norway; St.Vincent–Grenadines; Tunisia; Vietnam

United Nations Security Council Resolution 2564 was adopted on 25 February 2021. It calls for a nationwide sanctions in Yemen. According to the resolution, the Security Council renews ban on destabilizing actors in Yemen, but Houthis reject latest resolution.

Russia abstained from the vote.

== See also ==
- List of United Nations Security Council resolutions concerning Yemen
- Yemeni Civil War (2014–present)
- List of United Nations Security Council Resolutions 2501 to 2600 (2019–2021)
