= 2016–2022 Yemen cholera outbreak =

Outbreak of cholera in the war-torn country of Yemen

- Map of Yemen on the globe
- Disease: Cholera
- Pathogen: Vibrio cholerae
- First outbreak: Yemeni Civil War; Saudi Arabian–led intervention in Yemen; Saudi Blockade of Yemen; Famine in Yemen (2016–present)
- Dates: October 2016–November 2021 (9 years and 7 months)
- Suspected cases^{‡}: 2,510,806 through December 2020
- Deaths: 3,981

An outbreak of cholera began in Yemen in October 2016. The outbreak peaked in 2017 with over 2,000 reported deaths in that year alone. In 2017 and 2019, war-torn Yemen accounted for 84% and 93% of all cholera cases in the world, with children constituting the majority of reported cases. As of November 2021, there have been more than 2.5 million cases reported, and more than 4,000 people have died in the Yemen cholera outbreak, which the United Nations deemed the worst humanitarian crisis in the world at that time. However, the outbreak has substantially decreased by 2021, with a successful vaccination program implemented and only 5,676 suspected cases with two deaths reported between January 1 and March 6 of 2021.

Vulnerable to water-borne diseases before the conflict, 16 months went by before a program of oral vaccines was started. The cholera outbreak was worsened as a result of the ongoing civil war and the Saudi Arabian-led intervention in Yemen against the Houthi movement that began in March 2015. Airstrikes damaged hospital infrastructure, and water supply and sanitation in Yemen were affected by the ongoing conflict. The government of Yemen stopped funding public health in 2016; sanitation workers were not paid by the government, causing garbage to accumulate, and healthcare workers either fled the country or were not paid.

The UNICEF and World Health Organization (WHO) executive directors stated: "This deadly cholera outbreak is the direct consequence of two years of heavy conflict. Collapsing health, water and sanitation systems have cut off 14.5 million people from regular access to clean water and sanitation, increasing the ability of the disease to spread. Rising rates of malnutrition have weakened children's health and made them more vulnerable to disease. An estimated 30,000 dedicated local health workers who play the largest role in ending this outbreak have not been paid their salaries for nearly ten months."

== Background ==
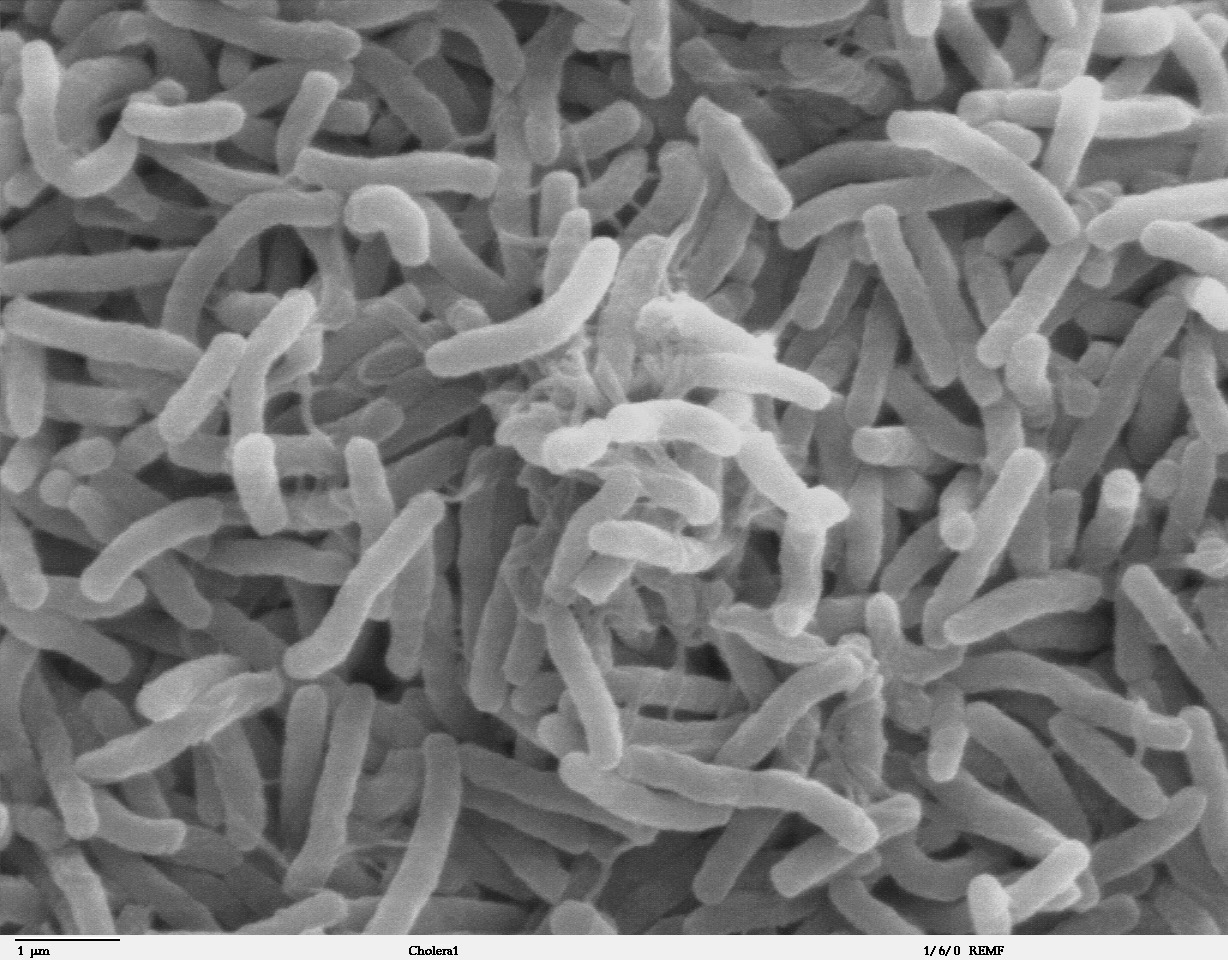
Scanning Electron Microscope (SEM) image of Vibrio cholerae bacteria

As of 2017, Yemen had a population of 25 million and was geographically divided into 22 governorates.

The Yemeni Civil War is an ongoing conflict that began in 2015 between two factions: the internationally recognized Yemeni government, led by Abdrabbuh Mansur Hadi, and the Houthi armed movement, along with their supporters and allies. Both claim to constitute the official government of Yemen. Houthi forces controlling the capital Sanaʽa, and allied with forces loyal to the former president Ali Abdullah Saleh, have clashed with forces loyal to the government of Abdrabbuh Mansur Hadi, based in Aden. A Saudi Arabian-led intervention in Yemen was launched in 2015, with Saudi Arabia leading a coalition of nine countries from the Middle East and Africa, in response to calls from President Abdrabbuh Mansur Hadi for military support.

Cholera is an infection of the small intestine by strains of the bacterium Vibrio cholerae. It is spread mostly by unsafe water and unsafe food that has been contaminated with human feces containing the bacteria. Symptoms may range from none, to mild, to severe. The classic symptom is large amounts of watery diarrhea lasting a few days. Diarrhea can be so severe that it leads, within hours, to severe dehydration and electrolyte imbalance. In severe cases, shock and seizures may occur. Vomiting and muscle cramps may also occur. The primary treatment is oral rehydration therapy—the replacement of fluids with slightly sweet and salty solutions. In severe cases, intravenous fluids may be required, and antibiotics may be beneficial.

Prevention methods against cholera include improved sanitation and access to clean water. Cholera vaccines that are given by mouth provide reasonable protection for about six months. Two oral killed vaccines are available: Dukoral and Shanchol. Total cost, including delivery costs, of oral cholera vaccination is under US$10 per person.

== Outbreak ==
Visualization showing the progression of the cholera outbreak in Yemen, from May 2017 – February 2018

Following "on the heels of civil conflict between Houthi rebels and the internationally recognized Yemeni regime", the Yemen cholera outbreak began in early October 2016, and by January 2017, the WHO Regional Office for the Eastern Mediterranean (WHO EMRO) considered the outbreak to be unusual in its rapid and wide geographical spread. The serotype of vibrio cholerae O1 involved is Ougawa.

The earliest cases were predominantly in the capital, Sana'a, with some occurring in Aden. By the end of October, cases had been reported in the governorates of Al-Bayda, Aden, Al-Hudaydah, Hajjah, Ibb, Lahij and Taiz and, by late November, also in Al-Dhale'a and Amran. By mid-December, 135 districts of 15 governorates had reported suspected cases, but nearly two-thirds were confined to Aden, Al-Bayda, Al-Hudaydah and Taiz. By mid-January 2017, 80% of cases were located in 28 districts of Al-Dhale'a, Al-Hudaydah, Hajjah, Lahij and Taiz. A total of 268 districts from 20 governorates had reported cases by 21 June 2017; over half are from the governorates of Amanat Al Asimah (the capital Sana'a), Al-Hudaydah, Amran and Hajjah, which are all located in the west of the country. In particular, 77.7% of cholera cases (339,061 of 436,625) and 80.7% of deaths from cholera (1,545 of 1,915) occurred in Houthi-controlled governorates, compared to 15.4% of cases and 10.4% of deaths in government-controlled governorates.

Using genomic sequencing, researchers at the Wellcome Sanger Institute and Institut Pasteur concluded the strain of cholera originated in eastern Africa and was carried to Yemen by migrants.

== Morbidity and mortality ==
Yemen authorities announced the cholera outbreak on October 7, 2016. By the end of that year, there were 96 deaths.

Following the October 2016 outbreak, the rate of spread in most areas declined by the end of February 2017, and by mid-March 2017, the outbreak was in decline after a wave of cold weather. A total of 25,827 suspected cases, including 129 deaths, were reported by 26 April 2017.

The number of cholera cases resurged in a second wave that began on 27 April 2017. According to Qadri, Islam and Clemens, writing in The New England Journal of Medicine, the dramatic April 2017 resurgence was "coincident with heavy rains that may have contaminated drinking water sources, and was amplified by war-related destruction of municipal water and sewage systems".

During May 2017, 74,311 suspected cases, including 605 deaths, were reported. By June, UNICEF and WHO estimated that 5,000 new cases per day were occurring, and that the total number of cases in the country since the outbreak began in October had exceeded 200,000, with 1,300 deaths. The two agencies stated that it was then "the worst cholera outbreak in the world".

By 4 July 2017, there were 269,608 cases and the death toll was at 1,614 with a case fatality rate of 0.6%. On 14 August 2017 the WHO updated the number of suspected cholera cases to 500,000. Oxfam said in 2017 the outbreak would become the largest epidemic since record-keeping began, overtaking the 754,373 cases of cholera recorded after the 2010 Haiti earthquake. In six months, more people were ill with cholera in Yemen than in seven years after the earthquake in Haiti, and the situation in Yemen was made worse by hunger and malnutrition.

On 22 December 2017, WHO reported the number of suspected cholera cases in Yemen had surpassed one million.

By October 2018, there were more than 1.2 million cases reported, and more than 2,500 people—58% children—have died in the Yemen cholera outbreak, which is the worst epidemic in recorded history and was, according to the United Nations (UN), the worst humanitarian crisis in the world. Between 1 January 2018 to 31 May 2020, the cumulative total number of suspected cases was 1,371,819 with 1566 associated deaths. The case fatality rate for the outbreak was 0.11% as of 2020, having declined from a high of 1% when the outbreak first began.

== Causes and challenges ==
UNICEF and the WHO attributed the outbreak to malnutrition, collapsing sanitation and clean water systems due to the country's ongoing conflict, and the approximately 30,000 local health care workers who had not been paid for almost a year. These factors resulted in a delayed vaccination program, which was not started until more than one million people were already ill.

=== Pre-civil war conditions ===
Even before civil war affected Yemen, it was "beset by circumstances that made it ripe for cholera". A country with high poverty rates, Yemen also suffered frequent droughts and severe water access problems, with only about half of the population having had access to good water and sanitation before the war.

Children under five showed a high prevalence of malnutrition, making them further susceptible to disease; Yemen had "one of the highest rates of childhood malnutrition worldwide". The health care system in Yemen before the conflict was weak and lacking infrastructure. For instance, before the war, 70–80% of children were vaccinated against measles, but the vaccination rate had dropped by the end of 2015.

=== Ongoing conflict ===
Because of the ongoing conflict in Yemen, and resulting displacement of people who do not have adequate food, water, housing or sanitation, pre-existing conditions were exacerbated. Shortages have been made worse by naval and air blockades. Bombing has damaged water and sanitation infrastructure. Airstrikes have destroyed facilities in the country for health care; "half of the nation's hospitals have been either destroyed by Saudi airstrikes, occupied by rebel forces, or shut down because there are no medical personnel to staff them".

Doctors Without Borders reported that a Saudi Arabian coalition airstrike hit a new Médecins Sans Frontières cholera treatment center in Abs, in northwestern Yemen. Doctors Without Borders reported that they had provided GPS coordinates to Saudi Arabia on twelve separate occasions, and had received nine written responses confirming receipt of those coordinates.

Grant Pritchard, Save the Children's interim country director for Yemen, stated in April 2017, "With the right medicines, these [diseases] are all completely treatable – but the Saudi Arabia-led coalition is stopping them from getting in."

=== Wastewater and solid waste management systems ===
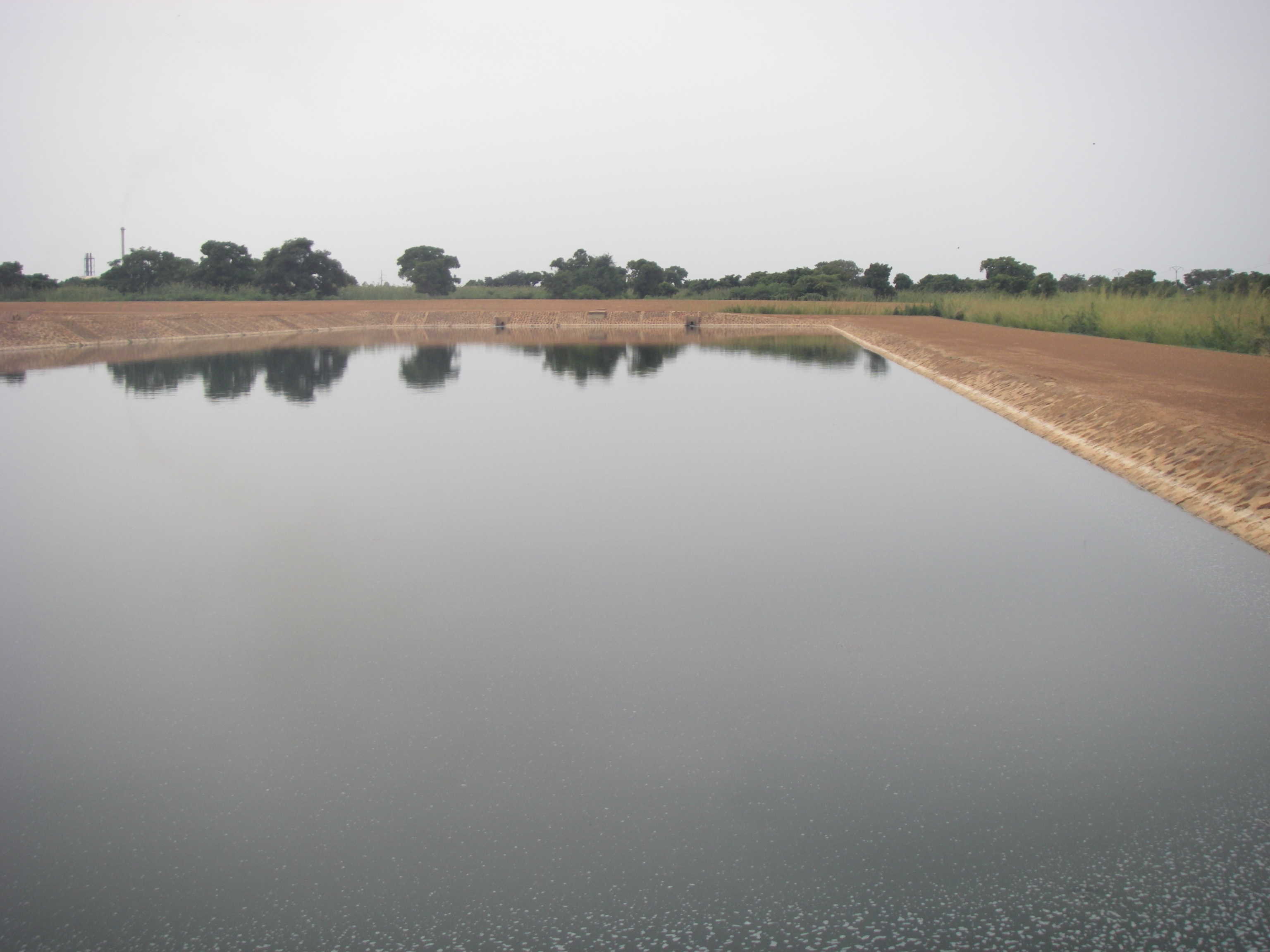
Wastewater stabilization ponds are generally used as a primary treatment, and are inefficient at completely removing infectious agents.

Yemen's wastewater and solid waste management systems are the least developed among Middle Eastern countries, which has been a major contributor to the cholera outbreak. With 16 functional sewage treatment plants (STPs) and a growing population, the country's sewage systems are ill-equipped to meet the needs of citizens and serve just 7% of the population. Actual flow rates through the STPs in Yemen exceed the flow rates they were designed to accommodate, which reduces their efficiency.

The treatment processes used are also suboptimal, with 68% of STPs using only stabilization ponds - which are generally intended as a primary treatment - to remove pathogens from sewage. This has resulted in high quantities of infectious agents in effluent, which is hazardous to health and can enable the spread of cholera.

Moreover, wastewater in Yemen is frequently reused for irrigation purposes by farmers due to a lack of awareness about safety risks. High concentrations of Escherichia coli, Streptococcus faecalis, Klebsiella pneumoniae, Enterobacter aerogenes, Salmonella typhi, S. typhimurium, and Shigella sonnei - among other harmful fecal coliforms - are present in this wastewater, and transmit to humans when they consume foods irrigated by it.

Official dumping sites for solid waste are being created increasingly close to communities, which has increased the risk of infection and general health issues among citizens. This is especially true for the roughly 70% of citizens without access to potable water, who consume water from wells near dumping sites.

=== El Niño ===
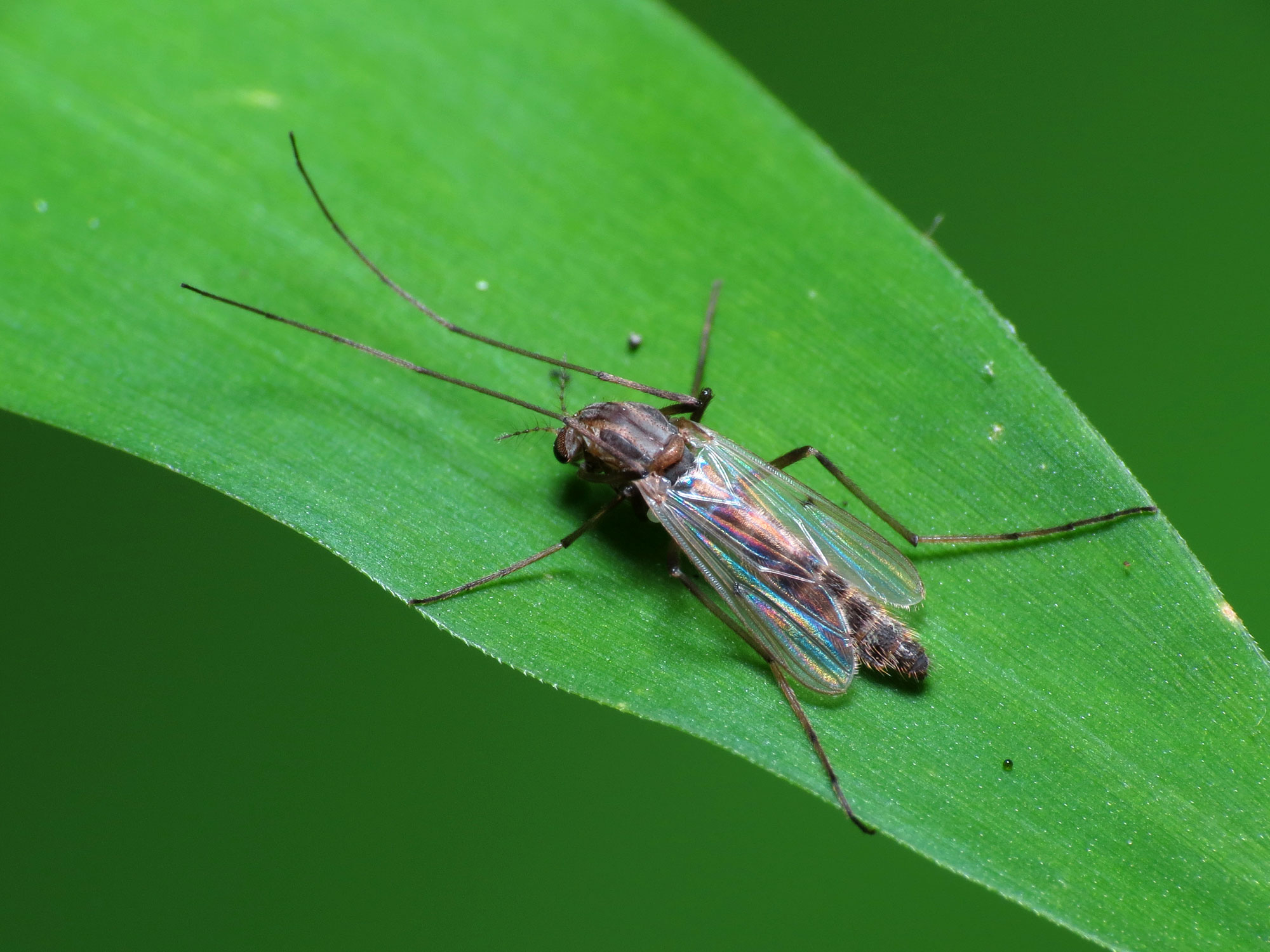
Adult Chironomid

The El Niño–Southern Oscillation phenomenon is a major driver of climate variability associated with health outcomes, including influencing cholera dynamics due to changes in rainfall. For example, in East Africa, there was an upsurge in cholera cases in areas with increased rainfall, along with an increase in cases in areas with decreased rainfall. In the 2015-2016 El Niño event, there were an additional 50 000 cases of cholera in East Africa. Based on genomic approaches, there was a linkage found between the epidemic in Yemen starting in 2016 and the earlier outbreaks in East Africa. This alludes to a possible connection between cholera in East Africa and Yemen. Chironomidae are natural reservoirs and carriers of the Vibrio cholerae bacterium. It has been suggested that adult chironomidae may aerially carry the bacterium between bodies of water, assisting in the transmission of cholera. Based on this evidence, it is hypothesized that the El Nino conditions over the Gulf of Aden may have contributed to the transmission of cholera from the Horn of Africa to Yemen through wind effects on cholera-contaminated flying insects.

=== Health services and infrastructure collapse ===
As of 2016, the government ended funding for public health, leaving many employees without salary. The impacts of the outbreak were exacerbated by the collapse of the Yemeni health services, where many health workers remained unpaid for months. A months-long strike of sanitation workers over unpaid wages contributed to the accumulation of garbage that entered the water supply.

Qadri, Islam and Clemens write that the dramatic April 2017 resurgence coincided with heavy rains, and "was amplified by war-related destruction of municipal water and sewage systems". An International Committee of the Red Cross (ICRC) worker in Yemen noted that April's cholera resurgence began ten days after Sana'a's sewer system stopped working.

Raslan et al write in Frontiers in Public Health:

A failing sewage system, continued conflict and inadequate health care facilities are only a few of the reasons contributing to this problem. Malnutrition, which is a significant consequence of the Yemen War, has further contributed to this outbreak.

=== Rainy season ===
Epidemiological modelling of the outbreak from October 2016 to January 2016 together with satellite image-derived meteorological data showed that the rainfall had a strong impact in increasing the chances of transmission, with the rainy season of April 2017 having coincided with the onset of the second wave of the outbreak topping at more than 50,000 cases per week. The geography of Yemen means that the Western mountainous plateau sees more rainfall, and has therefore an increased risk of high cholera incidence due to water precipitations.

=== Lack of vaccination ===
The International Coordinating Group on Vaccine Provision, which maintains vaccine stockpiles for cholera, announced a plan in June 2017 to send one million doses of oral cholera vaccine (OCV) to Yemen, but this plan stalled. Controversy surrounded whether vaccination was the best strategy, whether it was too late to start a vaccination campaign, whether there was enough stockpiled vaccine to meet worldwide needs, whether all of the reported cases of cholera in Yemen were true cases as opposed to simply cases of diarrhea or other similar symptoms, and the effectiveness of the vaccine. The request for vaccine was retracted.

In May 2018, the first OCV campaign in Yemen was launched. The WHO and UNICEF delivered oral vaccines to 540,000 individuals in August 2018.

Federspiel and Ali write in BMC Public Health:

OCVs were not delivered until nearly 3.5 years into this humanitarian emergency, which has most likely been due to ongoing conflict, logistical circumstances, the scale of the epidemic, impairment of the humanitarian response by the parts to the conflict and some degree of negligence from donors, politicians and other decision makers. Whatever the reasons, OCVs were not distributed until nearly 16 months into the cholera outbreak by which time more than a million cases had accumulated. Neither were they in the two years of WaSH infrastructure breakdown that preceded the outbreak. This should serve as a historic example of the failure to control the spread of cholera given the tools that are available. Today, "cholera outbreaks are entirely containable" (The Lancet editorial, 2017).

=== COVID-19 pandemic ===
The COVID-19 pandemic in Yemen is part of the worldwide pandemic of coronavirus disease 2019. As of 12 November 2020, there were 2,070 confirmed cases and 602 deaths. The COVID-19 pandemic has further burdened the already overwhelmed healthcare system in Yemen fighting a number of diseases including cholera, dengue fever, and malaria. Only half of existing health facilities are fully functioning while more than 17.9 million people of a total population of 30 million need health care services in 2020. In addition, those that remain open lack medical personnel, basic medicine, and essential supplies such as masks and gloves. The lack of flights in and out of Yemen to mitigate the pandemic has also restricted the movement of aid workers responding to the humanitarian crisis.

== Humanitarian activity ==
Through 2018, several humanitarian healthcare organizations had reported activity to contain the cholera outbreak. The International Committee of the Red Cross have supported 17 treatment centers with supplies including IV fluids, oral rehydration therapy supplies, antibiotics, chlorine tablets, in addition to sending engineers to help restore water distribution in Yemen. The International Rescue Committee (IRC) supplied seven hospitals with medicine and supplies, deployed health teams and trained volunteers, delivered health and nutrition services, and facilitated referrals of malnourished children.

The World Health Organization coordinated the Yemen Health Cluster with 40 member organizations, and together with Health and Water Sanitation and Hygiene (WaSH) units, explored the use of oral cholera vaccines (OCVs). The WHO reported operating 414 facilities using 406 teams active in 323 districts in Yemen, which included 36 treatment centers for cholera. In the management of cholera, they stated that they trained 900 health workers and ran 139 oral rehydration locations, to treat 700,000 reported cases of the illness. UNICEF reported that they ran awareness campaigns with 20,000 promoters, provided water to more than one million individuals, served as the WaSH lead, and delivered "40 tons of medical equipment including medicine, oral rehydration solution, IV fluids and diarrhea kits".

Médecins Sans Frontières (Doctors Without Borders) said it treated at least 103,000 individuals in 37 locations.

== Global responses ==
=== Canada ===
As of June 2, 2020, Canada has pledged $40 million in humanitarian aid for Yemen to help the politically unstable country cope with cholera, malaria, dengue fever, and diphtheria along with COVID-19. This brings Canada's total contributions to Yemen since 2015 to $220 million, which contributes towards the goal of US$2.4 billion for underfunded humanitarian programs run by UN agencies and humanitarian organizations in Yemen.

=== Saudi Arabia ===
Saudi Arabia has been backing the Yemen government in the fight against the Houthi rebels, and they are also one of the top donors for UN humanitarian aid operations in Yemen. On 23 June 2017, Saudi Arabia's crown prince, Mohammed bin Salman, authorized a donation in excess of $66 million for cholera relief in Yemen.

Mohammed al-Jaber, the Saudi ambassador to Yemen, has announced half a billion dollars from Saudi Arabia to support UN programs in 2020.

=== United Nations ===
An aid conference was held in Geneva in April 2017 that raised half of the US$2.1 billion that the United Nations (UN) estimated was needed.

As of July 8, 2019, the UN and partners are running 1200 cholera treatment facilities around the country, however, funding is an issue. The 2019 Yemen Humanitarian Response Plan required $4.2 billion to deliver assistance, but they ended up receiving $3.6 billion. For the 2020 plan, the UN has so far received 15% of the necessary $3.5 billion needed.

=== United States ===
On April 3, 2018, the United States (U.S.) announced $87 million in additional humanitarian assistance to help the people of Yemen, bringing the U.S. total assistance since 2017 to more than $854 million. This money will be used for food assistance, safe drinking water, emergency shelter, and medical supplies. The U.S. is also planning to provide $55 million in economic and development assistance, including programs to support livelihoods, rebuild infrastructure, and restore access to education.

On March 27, 2020, the Trump administration cut $70 million in assistance destined for northern Yemen, framing the decreased funding as a response to the interference of Houthi rebels. The U.S. officials were concerned that the assistance was directed to fighters instead of civilians. South Yemen, which is less populous, still received aid dollars.

=== United Kingdom ===
The United Kingdom (UK) government has been one of the largest humanitarian donors to Yemen, budgeting £139 million in 2017/2018 and earmarking £8m from the Yemen budget specifically to respond to cholera. The UK has partnered with organizations including UNICEF and the International Organisation for Migration (IOM) to combat the cholera disease in Yemen. The UK's humanitarian response includes nutrition support, clean water, sanitation, and medical supplies, such as chlorine tablets and hygiene kits. The UK Department for International Development (DFID) has also worked with the Met Office, NASA and U.S. scientists to deploy a model to predict and effectively respond to outbreaks of cholera. DFID Secretary Priti Patel has urged the international community to follow the UK government's steps to curb the cholera outbreak.

=== World Bank ===
On August 25, 2017, the World Bank announced $200 million U.S.D to support Yemen as it struggles to contain the cholera outbreak. This money is being used to strengthen the country's health, water, and sanitation systems.

== Statistics ==
The WHO provided regular outbreak updates for the epidemic in Yemen up until August 2020. Since then the epidemic has declined in numbers of cases and deaths, with 2020 seeing a total of 230,540 suspected cases and 84 deaths and 5,676 suspected cases with two deaths between January 1 and March 6 of 2021 Furthermore, UNICEF reports that in 2021 over 190,000 children received a cholera vaccine, achieving 94% coverage.

| Date | Suspected cholera cases | Cholera-related deaths | Source |
|---|---|---|---|
| 2016-10-10 | 11 | 0 | |
| 2016-10-13 | 186 | 0 | |
| 2016-10-23 | 644 | 3 | |
| 2016-10-30 | 1,410 | 45 | |
| 2016-10-31 | 2,241 | 47 | |
| 2016-11-06 | 2,733 | 51 | |
| 2016-11-17 | 4,825 | 61 | |
| 2016-11-24 | 6,119 | 68 | |
| 2016-12-01 | 7,730 | 82 | |
| 2016-12-08 | 8,975 | 89 | |
| 2016-12-13 | 10,148 | 92 | |
| 2016-12-28 | 12,733 | 97 | |
| 2017-01-10 | 15,468 | 99 | |
| 2017-01-18 | 17,334 | 99 | |
| 2017-02-26 | 20,583 | 103 | |
| 2017-03-07 | 22,181 | 103 | |
| 2017-03-21 | 23,506 | 108 | |
| 2017-04-27 | 26,070 | 120 | |
| 2017-05-20 | 49,495 | 362 | |
| 2017-06-10 | 96,219 | 746 | |
| 2017-06-15 | 140,116 | 989 | |
| 2017-06-22 | 185,301 | 1,233 | |
| 2017-06-29 | 224,989 | 1,416 | |
| 2017-07-06 | 275,987 | 1,634 | |
| 2017-07-18 | 351,045 | 1,790 | |
| 2017-07-27 | 408,583 | 1,885 | |
| 2017-10-26 | 862,858 | 2,177 | |
| 2017-12-19 | 1,009,554 (Note: Starting in December 2017, The World Health Organization began counting cases of cholera from 27 April 2017 onwards instead of from October 2016. This is resolved by adding 26,070 suspected cholera cases and 120 deaths from December onwards.) | 2,345 | |
| 2018-01-18 | 1,061,746 | 2,364 | |
| 2018-02-01 | 1,072,744 | 2,368 | |
| 2018-03-01 | 1,089,856 | 2,378 | |
| 2018-04-05 | 1,112,175 | 2,391 | |
| 2018-05-03 | 1,116,350 | 2,395 | |
| 2018-05-20 | 1,126,790 | 2,411 | |
| 2018-07-01 | 1,141,448 | 2,430 | |
| 2018-09-23 | 1,233,666 | 2,630 | |
| 2018-10-21 | 1,291,550 (Note: Starting on 8 November 2018, The World Health Organization began counting cases of cholera from 1 January 2018 onwards instead of from 27 April 2017. This is resolved by adding 1,048,701 suspected cholera cases and 2358 deaths from 21 October onwards.) | 2,604 | |
| 2018-11-11 | 1,303,839 | 2,614 | |
| 2018-11-25 | 1,317,319 | 2,625 | |
| 2018-12-09 | 1,329,285 | 2,641 | |
| 2018-12-16 | 1,341,020 | 2,666 | |
| 2018-12-30 | 1,350,139 | 2,682 | |
| 2019-01-06 | 1,359,279 | 2,694 | |
| 2019-01-13 | 1,367,849 | 2,703 | |
| 2019-01-20 | 1,376,488 | 2,708 | |
| 2019-02-03 | 1,383,907 | 2,716 | |
| 2019-02-17 | 1,390,625 | 2,724 | |
| 2019-04-07 | 1,420,393 | 2,775 | |
| 2019-04-14 | 1,448,233 | 2,823 | |
| 2019-04-28 | 1,470,735 | 2,873 | |
| 2019-05-05 | 1,488,906 | 2,886 | |
| 2019-05-12 | 1,505,610 | 2,898 | |
| 2019-05-19 | 1,522,437 | 2,916 | |
| 2019-05-26 | 1,539,305 | 2,928 | |
| 2019-06-02 | 1,555,073 | 2,944 | |
| 2019-06-09 | 1,572,731 | 2,955 | |
| 2019-06-16 | 1,592,995 | 2,970 | |
| 2019-06-23 | 1,613,872 | 2,989 | |
| 2019-06-30 | 1,635,737 | 3,002 | |
| 2019-07-07 | 1,657,286 | 3,020 | |
| 2019-07-21 | 1,676,745 | 3,031 | |
| 2019-07-28 | 1,694,765 | 3,045 | |
| 2019-08-04 | 1,711,380 | 3,055 | |
| 2019-08-11 | 1,727,688 | 3,069 | |
| 2019-08-18 | 1,743,984 | 3,077 | |
| 2019-08-25 | 1,761,482 | 3,089 | |
| 2019-09-01 | 1,780,028 | 3,099 | |
| 2019-09-29 | 1,796,653 | 3,114 | |
| 2019-10-06 | 1,813,480 | 3,127 | |
| 2019-10-13 | 1,827,904 | 3,143 | |
| 2019-10-20 | 1,842,251 | 3,151 | |
| 2019-10-27 | 1,855,175 | 3,161 | |
| 2019-11-03 | 1,864,556 | 3,167 | |
| 2019-11-10 | 1,875,918 | 3,170 | |
| 2019-11-17 | 1,887,449 | 3,174 | |
| 2019-12-01 | 1,898,236 | 3,176 | |
| 2019-12-22 | 1,907,658 | 3,178 | |
| 2019-12-29 | 1,916,811 | 3,181 | |
| 2020-01-05 | 1,925,087 | 3,184 | |
| 2020-01-12 | 1,932,798 | 3,188 | |
| 2020-01-26 | 1,940,893 | 3,192 | |
| 2020-05-17 | 1,944,360 | 3,192 | |
| 2020-05-24 | 1,946,84 | 3,192 | |
| 2020-05-31 | 1,949,920 | 3,192 | |
| 2020-06-07 | 1,953,033 | 3,194 | |
| 2020-06-14 | 1,956,124 | 3,198 | |
| 2020-06-21 | 1,959,308 | 3,198 | |
| 2020-06-28 | 1,962,357 | 3,199 | |
| 2020-07-12 | 1,965,664 | 4,001 | |
| 2020-07-19 | 1,968,536 | 4,001 | |
| 2020-07-26 | 1,971,551 | 4,001 | |
| 2020-08-02 | 1,973,697 | 4,002 | |
| 2020-08-16 | 1,975,403 | 4,002 | |
| 2021-04-30 | 5120 | 3 | |

== See also ==
- Famine in Yemen
- COVID-19 pandemic in Yemen
