= March 2015 Sanaa mosque bombings =

Four suicide attacks on 20 March 2015 in Sanaa, Yemen

2015 Sanaa mosque bombings
- Part of the Yemeni Civil War (2014–present)
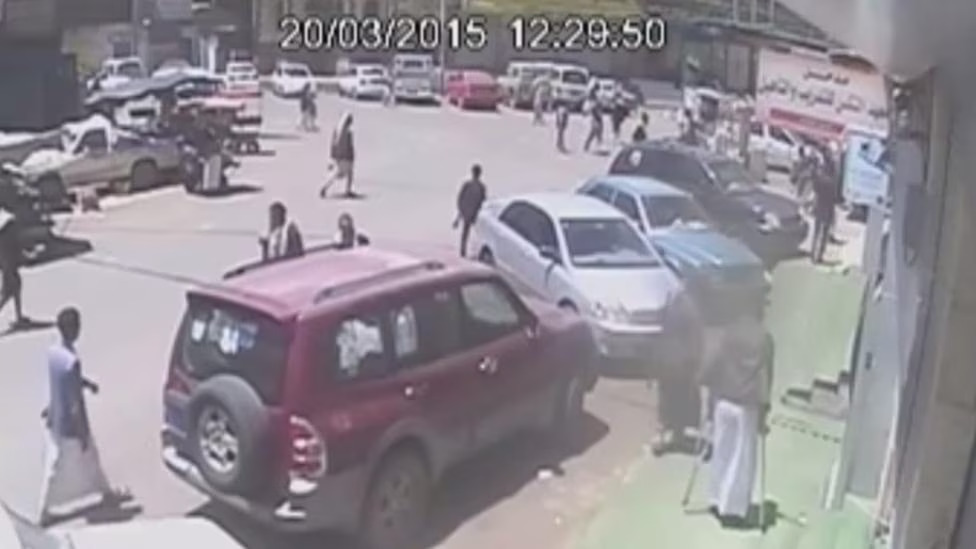
- A suicide bomber in crutches (bottom right) approaching the al-Badr mosque
- Location: Sanaa, Yemen
- Date: 20 March 2015 (UTC+03:00)
- Target: Shia worshippers
- Attack type: Quadruple suicide bombing
- Weapon: bombs with syths
- Deaths: 142
- Injuries: 351
- Perpetrator: Islamic State of Iraq and the Levant (claimed responsibility)

The 2015 Sanaa mosque bombings were four suicide attacks targeting two mosques on 20 March 2015 in Sanaa, Yemen.

== The attack ==
The al-Badr and al-Hashoosh mosques came under suicide attack during midday prayers. The blasts killed 137 people and wounded more than 357, making it the deadliest terrorist attack in Yemen's history. One suicide bomber blew up outside the gate of al-Badr mosque when he was caught by militia guards, and the second detonated his device among fleeing people inside the mosque. Another pair of bombers blew up at Al-Hashoosh mosque.

The targeted mosques are linked to the Houthis, a group of the Zaidiyyah sect of Shia Islam. The Houthis deposed the Yemeni government earlier in 2015 after they took control of Sanaa the previous year.

== Responsibility ==
The Islamic State of Iraq and the Levant (ISIL) Yemen branch claimed responsibility for the attack. In a recording released by the group, they stated: "IS soldiers will not rest until they stop the Safawi [Iranian] operation in Yemen.”

According to Bruce Riedel of the Brookings Institution, the bombings were more likely carried out by al-Qaeda in the Arabian Peninsula (AQAP). AQAP denied this, citing instructions from Ayman al-Zawahiri to not attack mosques or markets. If ISIL was responsible, these would be the first attacks it carried out in Yemen.

== Reactions ==
The U.S. Department of State called for a stop to any military actions, to be followed by a diplomatic solution. Ban Ki-moon, the United Nations Secretary General, demanded that all sides "immediately cease all hostile actions and exercise maximum restraint."

On 23 March, an Iranian Airbus A310 of Mahan Air loaded with 13-ton package of humanitarian aids as well as aid workers of Iranian Red Crescent landed at Sanaa. On its departure from Yemen, 52 wounded people of the bombings were transferred to Tehran to receive treatment. Iran's deputy ambassador Rasai Ebadi said more aid would come soon.

== See also ==
- 2012 Unity Day parade rehearsal bombing
- 2013 Yemeni Ministry of Defense attack
- January 2015 Sanaa bombing
- List of massacres in Yemen
- Persecution of Shias by the Islamic State
