= 2014 Radda bombings =

Terrorist incident in Yemen

- Part of the Yemeni Civil War (2014-present)
- Location of Al Bayda Governorate in Yemen
- Location: Radda District, Yemen
- Date: December 16, 2014
- Target: Houthis
- Attack type: Car bomb, suicide bombing
- Deaths: 31
- Perpetrator: al-Qaeda

The 2014 Rada' bombings occurred on December 16, 2014, after two car bombs exploded in Radda District, Al Bayda Governorate, Yemen killing as many as 31 people, including 20 children.

== Bombings ==
Al-Qaeda militants were targeting Houthi militants. The first bomb struck a gathering point where a group of Houthis were located. The first car was filled with potatoes and had the bombs hidden underneath. The second bomb was intended to hit the home of Abdullah Idris, a Shiite rebel leader. The bomb did not make it far enough and blew up next to a bus that was carrying children home from school. Altogether, up to 31 people died from the bombings, including 20 children.

== Reaction ==
The United Nations responded to the bombings, stating "The attack on the schoolchildren on Tuesday in Yemen and other countries aroused a great sadness and must not be allowed to continue."
