= Timeline of the Yemeni civil war (2014–present) =

The following is a timeline of the Yemeni civil war, which began in September 2014.

== 2014 ==
Map of Houthi offensives in 2014

After several weeks of street protests against the Hadi administration, which made cuts to fuel subsidies that were unpopular with the group, the Houthis fought the Yemen Army forces under the command of General Ali Mohsen al-Ahmar. In a battle that lasted only a few days, Houthi fighters seized control of Sanaa, the Yemeni capital, in September 2014. The Houthis forced Hadi to negotiate an agreement to end the violence, in which the government resigned and the Houthis gained an unprecedented level of influence over state institutions and politics.

== 2015 ==
In January 2015, unhappy with a proposal to split the country into six federal regions, Houthi fighters seized the presidential compound in Sanaa. The power play prompted the resignation of President Abdrabbuh Mansur Hadi and his ministers. The Houthi political leadership then announced the dissolution of parliament and the formation of a Revolutionary Committee to govern the country on 6 February 2015.

On 21 February, one month after Houthi militants confined Hadi to his residence in Sanaʽa, he slipped out of the capital and traveled to Aden. In a televised address from his hometown, he declared that the Houthi takeover was illegitimate and indicated he remained the constitutional president of Yemen. His predecessor as president, Ali Abdullah Saleh—who had been widely suspected of aiding the Houthis during their takeover of Sanaʽa the previous year—publicly denounced Hadi and called on him to go into exile.

On 19 March 2015, the troops loyal to Hadi clashed with those who refused to recognize his authority in the Battle of Aden Airport. The forces under General Abdul-Hafez al-Saqqaf were defeated, and al-Saqqaf fled toward Sanaʽa. In apparent retaliation for the routing of al-Saqqaf, warplanes reportedly flown by Houthi pilots bombed Hadi's compound in Aden.

After 20 March 2015 Sanaa mosque bombings, in a televised speech, Abdul-Malik al-Houthi, the leader of the Houthis, said his group's decision to mobilize for war was "imperative" under current circumstances and that Al-Qaeda in the Arabian Peninsula and its affiliates—among whom he counts Hadi—would be targeted, as opposed to southern Yemen and its citizens. President Hadi declared Aden to be Yemen's temporary capital while Sanaʽa remained under Houthi control.

Also, the same day as the mosque bombings, al-Qaeda militants captured the provincial capital of Lahij, Al Houta District after killing about 20 soldiers before being driven out several hours later.

=== Political developments ===
Hadi reiterated in a speech on 21 March 2015 that he was the legitimate president of Yemen and declared, "We will restore security to the country and hoist the flag of Yemen in Sanaʽa, instead of the Iranian flag." He also declared Aden to be Yemen's "economic and temporary capital" due to the Houthi occupation of Sanaʽa, which he pledged would be retaken.

In Sanaa, the Houthi Revolutionary Committee appointed Major General Hussein Khairan as Yemen's new Defence Minister and placed him in overall command of the military offensive.

=== Control of Taiz ===
On 22 March 2015, Houthi forces backed by troops loyal to Saleh entered Taiz, Yemen's third-largest city, and quickly took over its key points. They encountered little resistance, although one protester was shot dead and five were injured. Western media outlets began to suggest Yemen was sliding into civil war as the Houthis from the north confronted holdouts in the south.

On 14 December 2015, the pro-Saleh Yemeni Army and Houthi militants carried out a strike with an Tochka ballistic missile against a military camp that was being used by troops of the Saudi-led coalition, south-west of the city of Taiz.

=== Western Yemen advance ===
Map of Houthi offensives in 2015

On 23 March 2015, Houthi forces advanced towards the strategic Bab-el-Mandeb strait, a vital corridor through which much of the world's maritime trade passes. The next day, fighters from the group reportedly entered the port of Mocha.

On 31 March 2015, Houthi fighters entered a coastal military base on the strait after the 17th Armoured Division of the Yemen Army opened the gates and turned over weapons to them.

On 2 April 2015, Mahamoud Ali Youssouf, the foreign minister of Djibouti, said the Houthis placed heavy weapons and fast attack boats on Perim and a smaller island in the Bab-el-Mandeb strait. He warned that the weapons posed "a big danger" to his country, commercial shipping traffic, and military vessels.

=== Southern offensive ===
==== Battle of Dhale ====
On 24 March 2015, Houthi forces seized administrative buildings in Dhale (or Dali) amid heavy fighting, bringing them closer to Aden. However, Houthi fighters were swiftly dislodged from Ad Dali' and Kirsh by Hadi-loyal forces.

Fighting over Dhale continued even as the Houthis advanced further south and east. On 31 March 2015, Hadi loyalists clashed with the Houthis and army units loyal to Saleh.

On 1 April 2015, a pro-Houthi army brigade was said to have "disintegrated" after being pummeled by coalition warplanes in Ad Dali. The commander of the 33rd Brigade reportedly fled, and groups of pro-Houthi troops withdrew to the north. The city reportedly fell into pro-government hands by the end of May.

==== Fighting in Lahij ====
On 24 March 2015, in the Lahij Governorate, heavy fighting erupted between Houthis and pro-Hadi fighters. The next day, Al Anad Air Base, 60 kilometers from Aden, was captured by the Houthis and their allies. The base had recently been abandoned by United States of America USSOCOM troops. Defense Minister Mahmoud al-Subaihi, one of Hadi's top lieutenants, was captured by the Houthis in Al Houta and transferred to Sanaʽa. Houthi fighters also advanced to Dar Saad, a small town, 20 km north of Aden.

On 26 March 2015, after clashes erupted in Aden, Hadi loyalists counterattacked as a Saudi-led military intervention got underway. Artillery shelled Al Anad Air Base, forcing some of its Houthi occupants to flee the area. Saudi airstrikes also hit Al Anad. Despite the airstrikes, the southern offensive continued.

=== Fighting reaches Aden ===
Houthi offensive on Aden

Pro-government counteroffensive

In Aden, military officials said militias and military units loyal to Hadi had "fragmented" by 25 March, speeding the Houthi advance. They said the Houthis were fighting Hadi's troops on five different fronts. Aden International Airport suspended all flights. Fighting reached Aden's outskirts on 25 March 2015, with pro-Saleh soldiers taking over Aden International Airport and clashes erupting at an army base. Hadi reportedly fled his "temporary capital" by boat as the unrest worsened. On 26 March 2015, he resurfaced in the Saudi capital, Riyadh, where he arrived by plane and was met by Saudi Prince Mohammad bin Salman Al Saud.

Over the following days, Houthi and allied army forces encircled Aden and hemmed in Hadi's holdouts, although they encountered fierce resistance from the embattled president's loyalists and armed city residents. They began pressing into the city center on 29 March 2015 despite coalition air strikes and shelling from Egyptian Navy warships offshore.

On 2 April 2015, the compound that has been used as a temporary presidential palace was taken by the Houthis, and fighting moved into the central Crater and Al Mualla districts.

A small contingent of foreign troops was reportedly deployed in Aden by early May, fighting alongside anti-Houthi militiamen in the city. Saudi Arabia denied the presence of ground troops, while Hadi's government claimed the troops were Yemeni special forces who had received training in the Persian Gulf and were redeployed to fight in Aden.

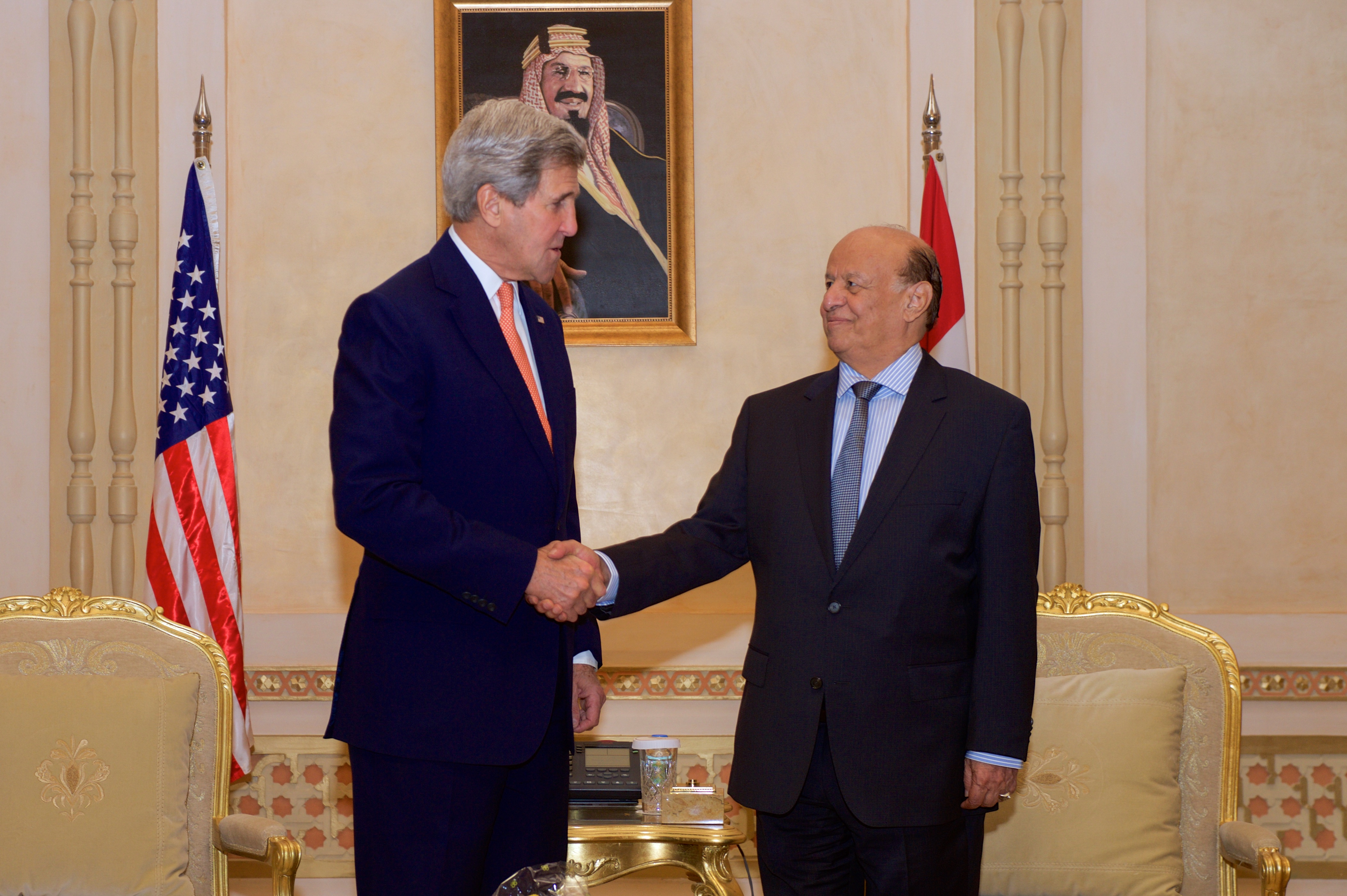
President Hadi meets U.S. Secretary of State John Kerry in Riyadh, Saudi Arabia, 7 May 2015

On 21 July 2015, forces loyal to Hadi recaptured Aden with support from Saudi Arabia in Operation Golden Arrow after months of fighting. This allowed supplies to finally reach the port city giving civilians desperately needed aid.

On 22 July 2015, a Saudi military plane landed in Aden international airport filled with relief aid. Also, a UN ship docked in Aden carrying much-needed relief supplies, the first UN vessel to reach the city in four months. Another ship sent by the UAE also delivered medical aid. On 21 July 2015, a UAE technical team had arrived to repair the tower and passenger terminal at Aden international airport, heavily damaged in clashes. On 24 July 2015, a military plane from the UAE arrived filled with relief aid.

On 4 August 2015, Houthi forces were pushed back from the Al-Anad airbase, by Pro-Hadi forces.

On 17 October 2015, Saudi Arabia confirmed the arrival of Sudanese troops into Aden for the purpose of bolstering the Saudi-led coalition.

=== Other campaigns ===
==== Abyan Governorate ====
The Houthis racked up a series of victories in the Abyan Governorate east of Aden in the days following their entrance into Hadi's provisional capital, taking control of Shuqrah and Zinjibar on the coast and winning the allegiance of a local army brigade, but they also encountered resistance from both pro-Hadi army brigadiers and al Qaeda in the Arabian Peninsula militants. Zinjibar and Jaar were recaptured by AQAP on 2 December 2015.

==== Hadhramaut Governorate ====
Al-Qaeda in the Arabian Peninsula took control of Mukalla in the eastern Hadhramaut Governorate on 2 April 2015, driving out soldiers defending the city with mortar fire and springing some 300 inmates from prison, including a local al-Qaeda leader.

Local tribal fighters aligned with Hadi surrounded and entered Mukalla on 4 April 2015, retaking parts of the city and clashing with both al-Qaeda militants and army troops. Still, the militants remained in control of about half of the town. In addition, al-Qaeda fighters captured a border post with Saudi Arabia in an attack that killed two soldiers.

On 13 April 2015, Southern militia said they took control of the army base loyal to the Houthis near Balhaf. Mukalla city was recaptured in late April 2016, after UAE and Hadi loyalists troops entered the city, killing some 800 AQAP fighters.

On 12 June 2015, Al-Qaeda in the Arabian Peninsula leader Nasir al-Wuhayshi was killed in a US drone strike in Mukalla.

==== Lahij Governorate ====
Although the Houthis took control of Lahij on the road to Aden, resistance continued in the Lahij Governorate. Ambushes and bombings struck Houthi supply lines to the Aden front, with a land mine killing a reported 25 Houthi fighters on their way to Aden on 28 March 2015.

==== Shabwah Governorate ====
Fighting also centered on the Shabwa Province, in the oil-rich Usaylan region, where Al-Qaeda in the Arabian Peninsula (AQAP) and Ansar al-Sharia hold sway. On 29 March 2015, 38 were killed in fighting between the Houthis and Sunni tribesmen. Tribal sources confirmed the death toll, and claimed only 8 of them were from their side, with the other 30 either Houthis or their allies from the Yemeni military.

On 9 April 2015, the Houthis and their allies seized the provincial capital of Ataq. The takeover was facilitated by local tribal chiefs and security officials. AQAP seized Azzan, and Habban in early February 2016.

==== Elsewhere ====
On 22 March 2015, in the province of Marib, 6 members of pro-Hadi tribes were killed during fighting against Houthis.

On 23 March 2015, 15 Houthis and 5 tribesmen were killed in clashes in the Al Bayda Governorate. During the fight between Hadi loyalists and Houthi militiamen in Sanaa, the Ethiopian embassy was reportedly struck by shelling on 3 April 2015. The Ethiopian government said the attack appeared to be unintentional. No injuries at the embassy were reported.

On 7 April 2015, armed tribesmen drove off Houthis who had set up a makeshift camp in southern Ibb Governorate and seized their weapons.

Between 17 and 18 April 2015, at least 30 people were killed when the Houthis and allied army units attacked a pro-Hadi military base in Taiz. The dead included 8–16 pro-Hadi and 14–19 Houthi fighters, as well as 3 civilians. Another report put the number of dead at 85.

On the morning of 19 April 2015, 10 more Houthi and four pro-Hadi fighters were killed.

A pro-Hadi official claimed 150 pro-Houthi and 27 tribal fighters had been killed in fighting in Marib Governorate between 2 and 21 April 2015.

On 4 September 2015 a Houthi missile hit an ammunition dump at a military base in Marib killing 45 UAE, 10 Saudi and 5 Bahraini soldiers.

On 16 October 2015, Houthis and allied forces reportedly seized control of a military base in the town of Mukayris, pushing opponents out of southern Bayda.

== 2016 ==
In January 2016, a new conflict began in Aden, with ISIL and AQAP controlling neighborhoods in the city.

On 6 January, Hadi loyalists captured the strategic port of Midi District, but insurgents backed by the Houthi government continued making attacks in and around the city. On 23 January, the first phase of the Battle of Port Midi ended, although an insurgency continues.

On 31 January, the 2016 Alanad Air Base missile attack occurs.

As of February 2016, pro-Hadi forces had managed to enter Sanaa Governorate by capturing the Nihm District killing dozens of Houthi fighters. They continued their advance, capturing some cities and villages.

On 1 February, Al-Qaeda captured Azzan.

On 20 February, the Southern Abyan Offensive ended, being captured by AQAP linked them with their headquarters in Mukalla.

On 22 February, the Abyan conflict begins. On 4 March, the Missionaries of Charity attack in Aden occurs.

On 16 March, bombing of Khamees Market in Mustaba'a, Hajjah. The US-supplied precision-guided Mark 84 bomb killed 97 people.

On 25 March, the 2016 Aden car bombing occurs.

On 24 April, Battle of Mukalla (2016) – Saudi led coalition retake Mukalla from Al-Qaeda.

On 26 April, the Hadramaut Insurgency begins. On 15 May, the May 2016 Yemen police bombings occur.

On 23 May, the 23 May 2016 Yemen bombings occur. On 28 June, the June 2016 Mukalla attacks occur.

On 20 August, there were demonstrations at Satin Sanaa's Sabeen square to show support for the Higher Political Council, the Shia Houthi governing body and former Yemeni president Ali Abdullah Saleh. The head of council pledged to form a full government within days. The crowd size was variously placed at tens of thousands and hundreds of thousands. The crowd's demands were "quickly rejected by the United Nations and the country's internationally recognized government." Meanwhile, Saudi planes roared above the population and bombed nearby leaving an unknown number of casualties.

On 29 August, the August 2016 Aden bombing occurs.

On 1 October, UAE ship HSV-2 Swift attacked and damaged by Houthi missile off Yemeni coast. On 8 October, the 2016 Sana'a funeral airstrike occurs. From 10–18 December, the December 2016 Aden suicide bombings occur.

== 2017 ==
On 29 January, U.S. Navy SEALs carried out a raid in Yakla. Despite a plan for the raid having existed for months, the Obama administration refused to approve the raid, because President Barack Obama feared an escalation of U.S. involvement in Yemen. After 5 days in office, President Trump approved the raid, over dinner with his new secretary of defense and chairman of the Joint Chiefs of Staff. The raid caused numerous civilian casualties, with "a chain of mishaps and misjudgments" leading to a 50-minute shootout that led to the killing of one SEAL, the wounding of three other SEALs, and the deliberate destruction of a $75 million U.S. MV-22 Osprey aircraft that had been badly damaged on landing. The U.S. government reported that 14 Al-Qaeda in the Arabian Peninsula fighters were killed and acknowledged that "civilian noncombatants likely were killed" as well. Human Rights Watch, citing witness statements, reported the death of 14 civilians, including nine children. From 1 to 8 March, the US conducted 45 airstrikes against AQAP, a record amount of airstrikes conducted against the group by the US in recent history. The airstrikes were reported to have killed hundreds of AQAP militants. On 25 March a court in Houthi-controlled Sanaa sentenced Hadi and six other government officials to death in absentia for "high treason" in the form of "incitement and assistance to Saudi Arabia and its allies". The sentence was announced by the Houthi-controlled Saba News Agency. In May, ISIL's Wilayats in Yemen released propaganda videos of their operations, claiming attacks upon Hadi-led government, Houthi rebels and AQAP targets. On 22 July, Houthis and forces loyal to Ali Abdullah Saleh launched a retaliation missile (called Volcano H-2) on Saudi Arabia targeting the oil refineries in the Yanbu Province of Saudi Arabia. Houthis and Ali Saleh media have claimed that the missile hit its target causing a major fire, while Saudi Arabia has claimed that it was due to the extreme heat that caused one of the generators to blow up. On 27 July, Houthis and forces loyal to Ali Abdullah Saleh launched approximately 4 Volcano 1 missiles at King Fahad Air Base, the Houthis and Saleh said that the missiles had successfully hit their targets, whereas Saudi Arabia said that it was able to shoot down the missiles claiming that the Houthis real goal was to hit Mecca. On 1 October, a US MQ-9 Reaper drone was shot down north of Sanaa. U.S. Central Command stated that the Reaper Drone was shot down by Houthi air defense systems over Sanaa in western Yemen the previous day. The aircraft took off from Chabelley Airport in Djibouti and was armed. Also, sometime in late 2017, in a gradual escalation of U.S. military action, a group of U.S. Army commandos arrived to seek and destroy Houthi missiles near the Saudi Arabian border. In public statements, the U.S. government has tried to keep secret the extent of its involvement in the conflict since the Houthis pose no direct threat to America. CNN reported that on 16 October, the US carried out its first airstrikes specifically targeting ISIS-YP; the strikes targeted two ISIS training camps in Al Bayda Governorate. A US Defense official told CNN that there were an estimated 50 fighters at the camps, the Pentagon said in a statement that the camps’ purpose was to "train militants to conduct terror attacks using AK-47s, machine guns, rocket-propelled grenade launchers, and endurance training." The strikes, carried out in cooperation with the government of Yemen, disrupted the organization's attempts to train new fighters. On 2 December, Ali Abdullah Saleh formally split with the Houthis, calling for a dialogue with Saudi Arabia to end the civil war. Clashes in Saana ensued. On 4 December, Saleh was attacked and later killed by Houthi fighters while trying to flee Sanaa. Shortly after his death, Saleh's son, Ahmed Saleh, called for Saleh's forces to split from the Houthis. On 7 December, troops loyal to Hadi captured the strategic coastal town of Al-Khawkhah in western Yemen (115 km south of Al Hudaydah) from the Houthis. It was the first time in 3 years forces loyal to Hadi had entered the Al Hudaydah Governorate. On 24 December, troops loyal to Hadi captured the cities of Beihan and Usaylan, officially ending Houthi presence in any major city that is a part of the Shabwah Governorate. The Saudi-led coalition placed the number of enemy fighters killed at 11,000 as of December 2017.

== 2018 ==
Battle of Aden (2018): The southern separatists represented by the Southern Transitional Council were backing the Hadi government against the Houthis, but tensions erupted in January 2018 with the separatists accusing the government of corruption and discrimination. Gun battles erupted in Aden on 28 January 2018 after the deadline set by the separatists for Hadi to dismiss his cabinet elapsed. Pro-STC forces seized a number of government offices, including the Hadi government's headquarters. By 30 January, the STC had taken control of most of the city.

On 26 March, the Houthis launched a barrage of rockets at Saudi Arabia, killing an Egyptian man and leaving two others wounded in Riyadh. On 2 April, the Saudi-led coalition bombed a residential housing area in Al Hudaydah, killing at least 14 civilians and wounding 9. On 19 April, two leaders of Al-Qaeda in Yemen were killed on Thursday after a security raid was carried out by Yemeni forces in the province of Abyan. The security sources said that the leaders of al-Qaeda in Yemen, Murad Abdullah Mohammed al-Doubli, nicknamed "Abu Hamza al-Batani" and Hassan Baasrei were killed after a raid by security forces in the Al-Qaeda stronghold. Also known as Al-Qaeda in the Arabian Peninsula or AQAP, Al-Qaeda is primarily active in Yemen. The U.S. government believes AQAP to be the most dangerous of the al-Qaeda branches. On 22 April, the Saudi-led coalition carried out airstrikes on a wedding in Hajjah, a town in northwestern Yemen; the airstrikes left at least 33 people dead and 41 wounded. The attack consisted of two missiles that hit several minutes apart. Most of the people killed were women (including the bride at the wedding) and children. Ambulances were not able to get to the site of the attack at first, because, as jets were continuing to fly overhead after the attack, there were concerns about further airstrikes. Houthi media outlets announced on 23 April that Saleh Ali al-Sammad had been killed in an airstrike by the Saudi-led coalition the previous week. On 7 May, airstrikes by the Saudi-led coalition hit Yemen's presidency building. The attack left at least 6 people dead, all of whom were civilians. 30 people were also wounded in the airstrikes. On 8 and 9 June, heavy fighting began in al-Durayhmi and Bayt al-Faqih, 10 and 35 kilometers from the port city of al-Hudaydah, respectively. The United Nations warned that a military attack or a siege on the city could cost up to 250,000 lives. On 10 June, it was reported that the United Nations had withdrawn from Hudaydah. Also on 10 June, it was reported that so far, 600 people had died in recent days as the battle intensified. Furthermore, also on 10 June, Al Jazeera published an article containing reports of alleged torture in Houthi prisons in Yemen. On 12 June, it was reported that an airstrike by the Saudi-led coalition hit a Doctors Without Borders building. This was despite markings on the roof of the building identifying it as a building of health care and despite the fact that its coordinates had been shared with the coalition. No one was hurt in the attack, but the newly constructed building suffered significant damage. On 9 August, a Saudi airstrike on a school bus in a crowded market in Dahyan killed 40 young school children and 11 adults. The 227 kg (500 lb) laser-guided Mk 82 bomb used in the attack was made by Lockheed Martin and purchased by Saudi Arabia from the US. On 13 December, a truce was called in Hudaydah, a port city in Yemen. Warring parties agreed to have a ceasefire in the crucial place, which is a lifeline for half the country. The Houthis agreed to have all forces withdraw from Hudaydah in the following days, same as those from the Yemeni government alliance who were fighting them there, both being replaced by United Nations-designated "local troops". On 22 December 2018, Patrick Cammaert began leading the United Nations Mission to support the Hudaydah Agreement.

== 2019 ==
On 8 January, the Council on Foreign Relations listed this conflict as a conflict to watch during 2019. Similarly, the Italian Institute for International Political Studies also claimed it to be a conflict to watch in 2019. On 17 January 2019, Cammaert's convoy was reported to have been fired upon by unknown assailants, though Cammaert remained uninjured. Sporadic exchanges of fire and other ceasefire violations were reported between Houthi forces and coalition troops around Hudaydah in January. On 31 January 2019, Patrick Cammaert was replaced by Danish Major General Michael Lollesgaard as head of the UNMHA. An explosion in a warehouse on 7 April in Sanaa killed at least 11 civilians, including school children and left more than 39 people wounded. The Associated Press news agency said 13 were killed, including 7 children, and more than 100 were wounded. According to Al Jazeera and Houthi officials, the civilians were killed in a Saudi-led coalition airstrike. The Saudi-led coalition denied any airstrikes took place that day on Sanaa. The state-run news agency in Aden, aligned with the internationally recognized government, said the rebels had stored weapons at the warehouse. According to The Washington Post, "some families and residents of the district of Sawan said the explosion occurred after a fire erupted inside the warehouse. They said a fire sent columns of white smoke rising into the air, followed by the explosion." Their accounts were confirmed by several videos filmed by bystanders. On 6 June, Houthis shot down a US MQ-9 Reaper drone over Yemen, using an SA-6 missile, the CENTCOM asserted that the event "indicated an improvement over previous Houthi capability," and that it was enabled with Iranian assistance. On 23 June, Houthi rebels carried out a drone attack on Abha International Airport, killing a Syrian national and wounding 21. On 25 June, Saudi special forces announced that they captured the leader of the IS-YP, Abu Osama al-Muhajer, on 3 June along with other members including the chief financial officer of the organization. In June, the United Arab Emirates began scaling back its military presence in Yemen, amidst the soaring US-Iran tensions closer to home. According to four western diplomats, the key member of the Saudi-led coalition fighting in Yemen, UAE pulled out troops from the southern port of Aden and its western coast. One of the sources stated that "a lot" of forces have been withdrawn in three weeks. In July, the United Arab Emirates announced the partial withdrawal of its troops from Yemen, amid tensions with Iran on the Persian Gulf. On 12 August, fighters aligned with the Southern Transitional Council took control of Aden from the Saudi-backed government. On 12 August, Houthis shot down another US MQ-9 Reaper unarmed drone over Dhamar, Yemen. The claim was corroborated by two US officials. On 26 August, Houthi rebels fired a total of 10 Badr-1 ballistic missiles at the Jizan airport in southwest Saudi Arabia. The retaliatory attack led to dozens of killings and injuries. Riyadh claimed that it had intercepted six out of 10 missiles fired from Yemen. Houthi fighters ambushed a Saudi Arabian auxiliary force of around 1,100 men from the al-Fateh Brigade in the Jabara Valley in Saada Governorate as part of Operation Victory from God. On 29 August, the Yemeni government alleged that the United Arab Emirates conducted airstrikes over the forces heading to the southern port city of Aden to fight the UAE-backed separatists. A Yemeni commander, Col. Mohamed al-Oban stated that the airstrikes killed at least 30 troops. On 30 August, Islamic State took responsibility for a suicide bomb attack in the Yemeni port of Aden, which was carried out by a militant on a motorcycle. The attack reportedly killed six southern separatist fighters. On 1 September, the Saudi-led coalition fighting Houthi rebels in Yemen launched several airstrikes on a university being used as a detention center in a southwestern province. Initially, 60 fatalities were reported. However, officials and rebels later confirmed that at least 70 people died in the airstrikes in Dhamar, making it the deadliest attack of the year by the coalition. On 8 September, the Arab coalition including Saudi Arabia and the United Arab Emirates urged separatists and President Abd-Rabbu Mansour Hadi's government to halt all military actions in south Yemen. The two Gulf nations asked them to prepare for "constructive dialogue" to end the crisis between the two nominal allies. On 14 September, the Houthi rebels claimed the Abqaiq and Khurais drone attacks, which caused massive damage to Saudi oil facilities. On 24 September, 16 people including seven children were killed by a Saudi attack in Dhalea province. On 29 October, Yemeni officials reported that a large explosion hit the convoy of the internationally recognized government's defense minister. Mohammed Al-Maqdishi was inside a complex of buildings used as the ministry's interim headquarters in Marib Governorate. However, he survived the attack. On 13 November, Oman became the mediator between Saudi Arabia and the Houthi rebels. The country between the two conflicting nations held indirect, behind-the-scenes talks to end the ongoing war of five years in Yemen. On 29 December 2019, a missile-attack by Houthis in Yemen struck a military parade in southern separatist-controlled town of al-Dhalea, which killed at least five people and wounded others, Yemen's Security Belt forces said. On the same day, the Houthi rebels listed locations on their strike targets, which included six "sensitive" sites in Saudi Arabia and three in the United Arab Emirates.

=== Kuwait Initiative ===
On 27 September, Kuwait reiterated its willingness to host the parties involved in the Yemen war for another round of peace talks, in order to seek a political solution to the prolonged crisis. Kuwait had also hosted the Yemen peace talks for three months in April 2016. However, the negotiations broke down in August, after they failed to yield a deal between the parties involved in the war.

=== Riyadh Agreement on Yemen ===
On 5 November, a power-sharing deal, Riyadh Agreement on Yemen was signed between the Saudi-backed Yemeni government and the UAE-backed southern separatists, in the presence of Mohammed bin Salman, Mohammed bin Zayed, Abdrabbuh Mansur Hadi, Southern Transitional Council's chief Aidarus al-Zoubaidi and other senior officials. It was signed in Saudi Arabia and was hailed as a wider political solution to end the multifaceted conflict in Yemen. Despite the agreement, clashes between the STC and Hadi government forces took place in December.

== 2020 ==
=== January ===
On 7 January, Houthi rebels shot down a drone belonging to the Saudi-led coalition, in the northeastern province of Jawf. On 18 January, a missile attack on a military training camp in the central province of Marib killed at least 111 soldiers, while dozens were wounded. The Yemeni government blamed Houthi rebels for the attack, as there was no claim of responsibility. The strike targeted a mosque as people met for prayer, military sources told Reuters. On 29 January, Houthi rebels said they carried out missile and drones attacks on Saudi Aramco in the kingdom's southern Jazan province. However, Saudi oil authorities claimed that the missiles were intercepted. Al-Qaeda in the Arabian Peninsula leader Qasim al-Raymi was killed by an American drone strike. On 31 January, Houthi armed forces spokesman Gen. Yahya Saree announced that Houthi forces managed to capture roughly 2,500 km^{2} (970 sq mi) of territory including the city of Naham, and parts of the governorates of Al-Jawf and Marib, from Saudi-led forces. They recaptured the entire Sanaa Governorate. The coalition forces immediately denied this claim, claiming victory and progress in these areas."In the Nahm district, east of the capital Sanaa, the National Army managed to regain control of a number of Houthi-controlled areas," Majli said.

=== February ===
On 15 February, a Saudi Tornado was shot down during close air support mission in support of Saudi allied Yemeni forces in the Yemeni Al Jouf governorate by Houthis. On the day after, the Saudi command confirmed the loss of a Tornado, while video evidence was released showing the downing using a two-stage surface to air missile. Both pilots ejected and were captured by Houthis according to the Saudi Coalition. The next day, the Saudi-led coalition launched airstrikes, targeting Yemen's northern Al Jawf Governorate and killed 31 civilians.

=== March ===
On 1 March, Houthi forces captured the city of Al Hazm, the capital of Al Jawf Governorate. On 10 March, Houthis forces captured the town of Tabab Al-Bara and other portions of Sirwah District in Marib Governorate in their eastward offensive towards the city of Marib. On 30 March, the Saudi-led coalition carried out an airstrike on the Yemeni capital, Sanaa. The attacks came despite the UN Secretary-General António Guterres and other organizations asking to maintain ceasefire during the COVID-19 pandemic. In their statement, a group of regional experts also said that all political prisoners should be released from prisons to tackle the appalling health care system, and mitigate the COVID-19 pandemic from spreading in Yemen.

=== April ===
On 5 April, at least 5 women were killed and 28 people injured when shelling hit the woman's section of Taiz's main prison. The shelling came from the part of the divided city controlled by the Houthis. The attack was condemned by the High Commissioner of the United Nations High Commissioner for Human Rights (UNHCHR) Michelle Bachelet, who called it a breach of international humanitarian law. After the United Nations urged both sides to pursue peace talks in order to respond to the COVID-19 pandemic in Yemen, Saudi-led coalition spokesman Turki Al-Maliki announced a unilateral ceasefire beginning 9 April at noon, to support efforts to mitigate the COVID-19 pandemic. However, despite pledging to a ceasefire in Yemen, the Saudi-led coalition carried out dozens of airstrikes in the span of a week. The Yemen Data Project stated that at least 106 Saudi-led airstrikes, across 26 raids in Yemen have been carried out by the Kingdom over the last week. On 26 April, the Southern Transitional Council (STC) announced it was establishing self-rule in the parts of south Yemen under their control. The move threatened to renew the conflict with the Saudi-backed Internationally Recognized Government (IRG) of President Abdrabbuh Mansur Hadi. By 28 April, Houthi forces said that they managed to capture eleven of the twelve districts and 95% of the Al-Jawf Governorate with only the eastern district of Khab and al-Shaaf still being in Saudi-led coalition control. They controlled all of the former North Yemen except for Marib Governorate.

=== May ===
On 11 May, the Hadi government forces attacked the separatists' positions in the capital of Abyan province, Zinjibar. An STC official, Nabil al-Hanachi stated that they managed to "stop the attack and kill many of them". The renewed fight between the two sides brought additional risks to the already vague Riyadh Agreement. On 19 May, the President of STC Aidarus al-Zoubaidi visited Riyadh for two days, in order to discuss the prolonged impasse with the Hadi government. However, the talks were extended to the eighth day on 26 May, where the Saudi Crown Prince Mohammed bin Salman was facing a challenge to resolve the conflict between the Hadi government it sponsors and the separatists backed by the UAE. The conflict between the two sides reflected rising differences within the Saudi-led coalition, giving rise to a "war within a war" that the two are fighting against the Houthi rebels.

=== June ===
On 15 June, an airstrike from the Saudi-led coalition on a vehicle carrying civilians killed 13, including four children. On 14 June, the STC confiscated billions of Yemeni riyals en route to the central bank in the port city Aden. On 21 June, the STC seized full control of Socotra, deposing governor Ramzi Mahroos, who denounced the action as a coup. On 30 June, Houthis forces made further advances on the North of Badya and the South of Marib, seizing 400 km of terrain and inflicting 250 killed, wounded and captured Pro-Hadi Government forces.

=== July ===
On 2 July, coalition fighter jets launched scores of airstrikes on several Yemeni provinces. The operation was a response to ballistic missile and drone launchings by the Houthis against Saudi Arabia. The air raids ended a ceasefire that had been in place since April, as part of efforts to battle the coronavirus. On 21 July 2020, the International Organization for Migration revealed that between 30 March and 18 July, over 10,000 people got internally displaced citing fear of coronavirus.

=== August ===
On 19 August, Houthi forces said they captured part of Al Bayda after they launched an offensive.

=== December ===
On 31 December, explosions and gunfire targeted Aden International Airport whilst a plane carrying members of the recently formed Yemeni government disembarked. The attack left 28 people dead and 107 others injured. None of the passengers were hurt in the attack and the Yemeni cabinet members were quickly transported to Mashiq Palace for safety.

== 2021 ==
=== February ===
The Houthis launched another offensive on Marib Governorate in late February with the aim of capturing Marib city. After making steady advances in the governorate, the Houthis launched a three pronged assault on the city with occasional ballistic strikes. According to the International Organization for Migration (IOM), over 140,000 displaced refugees from western Marib fled fearing the Houthis' advance.

=== October ===
On 17 October, Houthi forces took control of the Abdiya, and Harib districts in Marib Governorate.

=== November ===
In the first weeks of November Saudi Arabian forces were reported leaving Al-Alam camp and Ataq, the capital of Shabwa Governorate, as well as the city of Aden. Saudi officials said the movement of troops responded to a re-deployment of forces drawn by tactical assessment. On 11 November, Houthi forces seized the US Embassy compound and captured Yemeni national staff. On 13 November, Saudi led-coalition forces left their positions around Hudaydah city. UAE backed forces also withdrew from southern Hudaydah, their positions were later occupied by Houthi forces. On 18 November, Agence France-Presse reported that nearly 15,000 Houthi rebels had been killed in Marib since mid-June, according to sources close to the rebels. On 23 November, the UN published a report stating that, by the end of 2021, the death toll of the war would reach 377,000, including direct and indirect causes. An estimated 70% are children under the age of five.

=== December ===
On 4 December, the Saudi-led Coalition announced it has conducted 11 separate operations targeting Houthis in Yemen, killing 60 Houthis and destroying seven military vehicles in the previous 24 hours. The commander of Yemen's third military region in Marib responsible for combat operations on various fronts of the city said the Yemeni army had also made several advances in recent days in Bayhan, Usaylan and Harib. On 5 December, the Saudi-led coalition said in a statement it had intercepted four drones fired by Houthi rebels towards Saudi Arabia's southern region. The statement also said Houthi rebels fired four ballistic missiles towards Marib province. On 25 December, two people were killed and seven injured in Jazan in southern Saudi Arabia following a projectile attack blamed on Houthi rebels. In response, three died and six were injured in the Houthi-held town Ajama, Yemen in a Saudi-led coalition air strike.

== 2022 ==
=== January ===
On 2 January, Houthi rebels seized in the Red Sea the UAE-flagged ship Rawabi, which was heading from Socotra to Jizan, claiming the vessel was carrying military supplies. Saudi Arabia said that the ship was carrying hospital equipment. On 17 January in an attack on the UAE capital Abu Dhabi, three people were killed and six others wounded when three fuel tankers exploded in the industrial area of Musaffah near storage facilities belonging to the state-owned oil firm, ADNOC. In the same attack, there was a fire at a construction site at Abu Dhabi International Airport. Houthis claimed responsibility for the attack which was possibly caused by drones. On 21 January an airstrike at a detention center in Saada killed 82 people and injured 266 others (according to Médecins Sans Frontières), which was condemned by the United Nations. The Saudi-led coalition denied involvement in the attack. Amnesty international reported that the coalition had carried out the strike using a laser-guided munition developed by U.S. defense company Raytheon Technologies. On 24 January, the Houthis once again fired rockets at the UAE, but the UAE and US military intercepted them. According to an analysis by Save the Children, January was the deadliest month in the war since 2018, with a total of 599 civilians killed or wounded. Oxfam reported that in the same month there were 43 coalition airstrikes on civilian targets.

=== April ===
The UN brokered a two-month nationwide truce on 2 April 2022 between Yemen's warring parties, which included allowing fuel imports into Houthi-held areas and some flights operating from Sanaa airport to Jordan and Egypt. On 7 April 2022, the Presidential Leadership Council formed as the executive body of the internationally recognized government of the Republic of Yemen.

=== June ===
The UN announced on 2 June 2022 that the nationwide truce had been further extended by two months. United States welcomed the truce extension in Yemen, praising Saudi Arabia, Jordan, Egypt, and Oman in helping to secure the truce.

=== August ===
In August 2022 the truce was renewed with commitment to 'an expanded truce agreement as soon as possible'. Southern separatists also launched a major offensive capturing the capital of Shabwah and most of the Abyan province.

== 2023 ==
=== March ===
On 20 March 2023, the United Nations and the International Committee of the Red Cross reported that the Yemeni government and the Houthis agreed to release 887 detainees, following 10 days of negotiations in Switzerland. Both parties also agreed to visitation rights in detention facilities and likely more prisoner swaps in the near future. Hans Grundberg, the UN’s special envoy for Yemen said that things are finally moving "in the right direction" toward a resolution of the conflict. The possible end to a devastating war in the region comes after the recent Saudi-Iranian rapprochement mediated by China a week earlier.

=== April ===
On 14 April, former chief of staff Mahmoud al-Subaihi and Hadi's brother and intelligence chief Nasser were released by the Houthis as part of a prisoner swap with the Yemeni government.

On 19 April, at least 85 people were killed and 322 people injured in a stampede in Sanaa, Yemen.

Negotiations to end the civil war that includes all major combatants begin in April 2023 after Iran and Saudi Arabia resume diplomatic relations.

=== September ===
On 14 September a Houthi delegation visited Riyadh for what could be the final round of peace talks.

=== October ===
Houthi military spokesman Yahya Saree spokesman said the Houthis had launched a "large number" of ballistic missiles and drones at Israel.

=== November ===
On 1 November 2023, an Israeli Air Force F-35 shot down a Quds cruise missile. On 9 November 2023, the Houthis launched a ballistic missile, possibly a Hatem, against the southern Israeli city of Eilat & for a 2nd time, it was intercepted in space. 2nd generation 2000 km range is suspected. However, Arrow 3s have a very high interception success rate. But the Houthis remain undeterred & launch Wa'aed drones at will against Israel using a flight path over the Red Sea.

=== December ===
On 11 December, Shia religious leader Abdul-Malik al-Houthi hit the Norwegian MT Strinda oil tanker while it was transiting a load of palm oil to Naples. The entirely Indian crew was uninjured. The ship burned spectacularly, but remarkably didn't sink. For Red Sea maritime security to and from the Suez Canal, Combined Maritime Forces (CMF) in Manama, Bahrain has a 39-nation naval partnership (which includes Norway &) which established (its) Combined Task Force 153 on 17 April 2022. (CDR Fridtjof is CMF's Norwegian Representative.) The International Maritime Security Construct was established on 16 September 2019 & also guards the Bab-el-Mandeb Strait via Coalition Task Force (Operation) Sentinel. Norwegian State Secretary for Foreign Affairs Eivind Vad Petersson (who reports to the Minister of Foreign Affairs of Norway) said the attack will cause "great financial and material losses".

On 15 December, a Houthi drone hit the German-based shipper Hapag-Lloyd's container ship MV Al Jasrah, causing a fire which was eventually extinguished & a Houthi ballistic missile hit, setting the Swiss-owned container ship MSC Palatium III ablaze. Because NATO's rulers authorized neither CTF 153 nor Operation Sentinel to deter the Houthis, the world's second largest shipping company, Maersk, stopped shipping containers through the Red Sea & the Suez Canal. Hapag-Lloyd paused all shipments through the Bab-el-Mandeb Strait through the weekend. 10% of all oil traded at sea passes through it & a staggering number of dollars of cargo per year.

16 December, HMS Diamond shot down a Wa'aed drone, forcing the Houthis to switch tactics to relying on their various types of ballistic missiles. USS Carney shot down 14 drones. Two more major shipping firms, Italian-Swiss based MSC and France's CMA CGM, suspended ship passage through the Bab-el-Mandeb Straight, costing the Suez (a combined) more than half its traffic. 40% of all exports & imports that are traded at sea transit through the strait. (Notably, Chinese COSTCO was still operating.)

On 18 December, the United States-led military operation by a multinational coalition formed in December 2023 was launched to respond to Houthi-led attacks on shipping in the Red Sea.

== 2024 ==
=== January ===
On 12 January 2024, the U.S. and the U.K., supported by many of their allies, launched airstrikes against the Houthis due to the group's actions in the Red Sea Crisis, beginning a series of strikes that would last for more than a year.

=== March ===
On 10 March, AQAP reported the death of emir Khalid Batarfi, along the selection of his successor Sa'ad bin Atef al-Awlaki.

On 24 March, AQAP ambushed an STC patrol in Wadi Omran, triggering a firefight which killed 2 STC fighters.

=== April ===
On 29 April, an AQAP IED attack targeted an STC military vehicle in Mudiyah. The blast reportedly killed six STC soldiers.

=== May ===
On 26 May 2024, The Houthis, with the help of the International Committee of the Red Cross, released more than 100 detainees in Sanaa, as part of a "unilateral humanitarian initiative" aimed at pardoning the prisoners and returning them to their families.

=== June ===
On 21 June, AQAP ambushed an STC vehicle in Abyan, leading to the death of an STC soldier and the injury of two others.

=== July ===
On 20 July, the Israel Defense Forces (IDF) launched an attack at Al Hudaydah Port in Yemen. Israel claimed it targeted weapon storage facilities. However, the attack damaged infrastructures belonging to Yemen Petroleum Corporation (YPC) and port cranes.14 people were killed, including 12 port employees of YPC were killed.

=== August ===
On 16 August, AQAP carried out a suicide car bombing targeting a Security Belt military barracks in Mudiyah district. The attack killed 16 soldiers and injured 18.

=== September ===
On 6 September, An armed attack killed 1 Yemeni Government Soldier.

On 29 September, Israel launched attacks in Yemen against the ports of Al Hudaydah and Ras Isa, killing 6 people

=== October ===
On 15 October, a roadside bomb placed by AQAP killed a commander of the STC fighters.

On 19 October, AQAP fighters fired an RPG at an STC military vehicle in Mudiyah district, killing two soldiers.

On 21 October, an AQAP grenade attack in Wadi Omran killed an STC soldier and wounded two others, while also wounding two civilians.

=== December ===
On 19 December and 26 December, Israel carried out several strikes against the Houthis in Yemen. Airstrikes by IAF also struck Sanaa International Airport.

== 2025 ==
- Late 2025: Southern secessionists loyal to the Southern Transitional Council (STC) launched a major military campaign, seizing dominant sectors across the Hadramaut and Al-Mahra provinces, including the port city of Mukalla.

== 2026 ==
=== January–August 2026 ===
- Clashes between Saudi-backed forces and the Southern Transitional Council (STC) during the 2025–2026 Southern Yemen campaign result in the STC's political disintegration and military containment.

=== September 2026 ===
- 3 September – After Saudi attacks on Sana airport, Houthis broke the 2022 truce by beginning an offensive down the western coast, seizing the strategic cities of Mokha, Hays, Al Khawkhah, and Dhubab near the Bab-el-Mandeb strait.
- Late September – Houthi forces intensify their campaign in the southwest, seizing Turbah and establishing a tight siege around Taiz.

=== October 2026 ===
- 4 October – Operation Dawn of Yemen, a broad counteroffensive supported by Saudi Arabia that targets Houthi territorial gains, was formally launched by the Presidential Leadership Council (PLC).
- 5 October – Government troops successfully cut off Houthi supply routes and retook Dhubab, including its airport. After that, they completely re-secured the Bab al-Mandab Strait and recaptured Mokha, encircling hundreds of remaining Houthi fighters.
- 9 October – The UN Security Council was formally warned by the UN Special Envoy to Yemen that the country has fully reverted to a full-scale civil war.
- 11 October – King Khalid International Airport in Riyadh was the target of a retaliatory cross-border long-range drone and missile strike by Houthi forces, which causes casualties and suspends aviation operations.
- 15 October – Houthi rebels attacked the Al-Maashiq Palace complex in Aden, the temporary capital of the internationally recognized government using drones and missiles. Five people, including members of Prime Minister Shaya al-Zindani's security detail, were killed and sixteen others were injured in the attack, which involved five ballistic missiles hitting the compound.
- 19 October – At least 73 recruits were killed and over 200 others were injured when Houthi forces fired three ballistic missiles at the al-Alam military training camp in the Shabwa Governorate. The United Kingdom declared after the escalation that it would increase its military assistance to protect Saudi Arabia from Houthi drone and missile attacks.
- 30 October –
  - The Maashiq Presidential Palace and Aden International Airport were hit by long-range ballistic missiles fired by Houthi forces at the temporary capital of Aden.
  - Taiz's governor issued a dire humanitarian alert, stating that Houthi blockades are driving the city "back to the stone age."
- 31 October – The International Organization for Migration (IOM) announced that since July, over 290,000 people have been displaced throughout western Yemen due to renewed hostilities.

=== November 2026 ===
- 1 November – Al-Jawf operations and strikes against Houthi infrastructure were carried out by government and coalition forces.
- 4 November – Government forces extended their offensive in the eastern Al-Jawf Governorate, seizing the strategic al-Dahida mountain range from Houthi fighters and cutting off rebel supply routes.
- 7 November –
  - According to Yemeni government forces, they conducted 875 strikes on Houthi positions, repelled attacks in Marib, advanced in the Al-Jawf Governorate, and neutralized about 130 fighters.
  - At least 44 civilians, mostly women and children, were killed and 40 injured, including nine women and eight children in Saudi strikes on the village of al-Shariya near Sanaa, according to Houthi authorities. They also alleged that subsequent strikes targeted responding paramedics.
- 15 November –
  - Following the severance of a coastal supply route, government-aligned forces withdrew from Dhubab Airport and positions near the Bab-el-Mandeb Strait, repositioning to defend Aden against advancing Houthi fighters.
  - The Houthis released 600 government soldiers in Sanaa who had been detained since fighting resumed in July. According to the International Committee of the Red Cross, which verified the operation, it was the largest single unilateral prisoner release of the conflict.
- 16 November – A unanimous vote by the country's parliament labeled the Houthis a terrorist organization.
- 20 November – Following evacuation orders and Houthi threats against Saudi Arabian Red Sea ports, the Saudi-led coalition claimed to have attacked Houthi targets at Hodeidah Port.

== See also ==
- Outline of the Yemeni crisis, revolution, and civil war (2011–present)
- Timeline of the Yemeni crisis (2011–present)
