= List of massacres in Yemen =

This page lists all massacres occurring in Yemen, both before and after statehood.

== List ==
Name	Date	Location	Deaths	Responsible party	Notes
Al-Waziri coup	1948, February 17 - March	Kingdom of Yemen	5,000	(Kingdom of Yemen) al-Waziris	Attempted coup d'état by the Al-Waziri clan against dynasty in the Kingdom of Yemen leaves 5,000 dead
1947 Aden pogrom	1947, December 2-4	Aden, Aden Protectorate	82	Arab rioters	Attacks against the Jewish community of Aden following the approval of the United Nations Partition Plan for Palestine on 29 November 1947
Kawma chemical attack	June 8, 1963	Kawma village	7	Egyptian Air Force	Egyptian chemical attack during the North Yemen Civil War
Kitaf chemical attack	January 15, 1967	Kitaf village	140	Egyptian Air Force	Egyptian chemical attack during the North Yemen Civil War
Sanaa school shooting	1997, March 30	Sanaa	6	Mohammad Ahman al-Nazari	The perpetrator, who believed that his daughter had been molested by school authorities, went on a shooting rampage at the Tala'i Private School, where he walked from classroom to classroom shooting teachers and students alike. After the shooting he left the building for the Musa Bin Nusayr School where he committed another attack. Nazari was sentenced to death and executed on 5 April 1997.
2007 Marib suicide car bombing	2007, July 2	Marib	10	Al-Qaeda	Eight Spanish tourists and two Yemenis are killed and another twelve are wounded in a suicide bombing attack at the Queen of Sheba temple.
2008 Bin Salman mosque bombing	2 May 2008	Bin Salman Mosque, Sanaa	15	Unknown	15 killed and 55 injured in a bombing at the Bin Salman mosque.
Friday of Dignity Massacre	18 March 2011	Sanaa	45	Yemeni Government	Government forces opened fire upon protesters during the Yemeni revolution, killing 45 people and wounding 200. It was the deadliest single event in the uprising.
2015 Sanaa mosque bombings	20 March 2015	Sanaa	142	Islamic State	Militants carried out four suicide bombings at the Badr and al-Hashoosh Shia mosques during prayers
September 2015 Sanaa mosque bombing	September 24, 2015	Sanaa	25	Islamic State	a double suicide bombing was carried out by Islamic State at a mosque in Sanaa, killing at least 25 people
Uqban Island massacre	22 October 2015	Uqban Island, Hodiedah	100+	Saudi Arabia	The Saudi Arabian-led coalition attacked fishermen near the Uqban island, near Hodiedah using attack helicopters. Red Cross reported that possibly up to one hundred fishermen were killed.
Missionaries of Charity attack in Aden	4 March 2016	Aden	16	Unknown	
Hajjah market airstrike	15 March 2016	Hajjah	119+	Saudi Arabia	The Saudi Arabian-led coalition launched two separate airstrikes on a crowded marketplace in Hajjah.
May 2016 Yemen police bombings	15 May 2016	Mukalla, Hadhramaut Governorate	47	Islamic State	
23 May 2016 Yemen bombings	23 May 2016	Aden	45	Islamic State	
June 2016 Mukalla attacks	28 June 2016	Mukalla	43-50	Islamic State	
Sanaa funeral airstrike	8 October 2016	Sanaa	143-155	Saudi Arabia	The Saudi Arabian-led coalition bombed a funeral in the capital Sanaa, hitting the crowd with several airstrikes. Around 150 civilians were killed.
Bab-el-Mandeb massacre	16 March 2017	Bab-el-Mandeb	42	Saudi Arabia	The Saudi Arabian-led coalition attacked a Somali refugee boat with attack helicopters.
Dahyan bus airstrike	9 August 2018	Dahyan	51	Saudi Arabia	
Dhamar airstrike	31 August 2019	Dhamar	100+	Saudi Arabia	The Saudi Arabian-led coalition bombed a prison complex in Dhamar with six separate airstrikes, killing more than 100 civilians.
2020 Aden airport attack	30 December 2020	Aden	28	Houthis	
2022 Saada prison airstrike	21 January 2022	Saada	87+	Saudi Arabia	Saudi airstrike on a prison in Saada kills at least 87 people and injures 266.
2024 al-Bayda bombing	19 March 2024	Radda District, al-Bayda governorate	12-20	Houthis	Victims included nine from the same family.
20 July 2024 Israeli attack on Yemen	20 July 2024	Al Hudaydah	14+	Israel	On 20 July 2024, the Israel Defense Forces (IDF) launched an attack on Hudaydah Port in Al Hudaydah, Yemen. The attack damaged a power generating station, an oil refinery, fuel storage facilities belonging to the Yemen Petroleum Corporation (YPC), and port cranes. Israel claimed it targeted weapon storage facilities. 14 people were killed, including 12 port employees and more than 90 were injured, many with severe burns.
26 December 2024 Israeli attack on Yemen	26 December 2024	Al Hudaydah Governorate and Sanaa	6	Israel	
2025 Ras Isa oil terminal airstrikes	17 April 2025	Ras Isa, Al-Hudaydah Governorate	80	United States	The United States Air Force conducted 14 airstrikes on an oil terminal in Ras Isa, killing at least 80 people and injuring 171 others.
2025 Saada prison airstrike	28 April 2025	Saada	68	United States	United States bombed a detention center, killing at least 68 and injured 47 others, all of them are African migrants.
28 August 2025 Israeli attacks on Yemen	28 August 2025	Sanaa	13	Israel	At least 13 people were killed by Israeli airstrikes, including prime minister, Ahmed al-Rahawi and other ministers.
September 2025 Israeli attacks in Yemen	10 September 2025	Sanaa and Al-Jawf Governorate	46	Israel	At least 46 people, including 31 journalists, were killed by Israeli attacks, making it the deadliest attack against journalists since the Maguindanao massacre.
