= 2025 Ras Isa oil terminal airstrikes =

U.S. airstrike on a Yemeni oil terminal

- Part of the March–May 2025 United States attacks in Yemen, the Red Sea crisis, and the spillover of the Gaza war
- Location: Ras Isa, Al Hudaydah Governorate, Yemen
- Date: 17 April 2025
- Target: Houthis (per U.S.)
- Attack type: Airstrikes
- Deaths: 80+
- Injuries: 171+
- Perpetrator: United States: United States Air Force

On 17 April 2025, the United States Air Force conducted 14 airstrikes on a key oil terminal in Ras Isa in Houthi-controlled Yemen. The strike killed at least 80 people and injured another 171, making it the deadliest attack in Yemen since the beginning of the March 2025 United States strikes on Yemen.

== Background ==
On 15 March 2025, the United States launched a large-scale campaign of air and naval strikes against Houthi targets in Yemen, marking the largest U.S. military operation in the Middle East during President Donald Trump's second term. The strikes targeted radar systems, air defenses, and ballistic and drone launch sites used by the Houthis to attack commercial shipping and naval vessels in the Red Sea and Gulf of Aden.

== Airstrikes ==
On 17 April 2025, the Ras Isa oil terminal—located about 55 kilometres (34 mi) north of the port city of Hodeida—was struck by 14 U.S. airstrikes. Footage showed large fires, explosions and destroyed fuel tankers in the area, as well as at least 10 charred bodies and men being treated for burns. The United States Central Command claimed to have targeted the area to "degrade the economic source of power of the Houthis." According to Al Jazeera correspondent Mohammed al-Attab, the air raids took employees and truck drivers by surprise, with the first air raids hitting the area as they were working. Around 70% of imports and 80% of humanitarian aid to Yemen goes through the ports of Ras Isa, Hodeida and as-Salif.

Al-Masirah reported that many of the dead were oil workers, adding that five paramedics were killed in secondary U.S. strikes as health authorities arrived at the scene.

== Reactions ==
- Houthis: The Houthis condemned the strikes as a "full-fledged war crime, as the port is a civilian facility and not a military one", and that "the U.S. administration fully responsible for the consequences resulting from its escalation in the Red Sea." Following the strikes, the Houthis announced missile attacks on Israel, which was later intercepted, as well as shot down a MQ-9 Reaper drone.
- United States: The U.S. Central Command claimed that the airstrikes were undertaken to degrade the economic source of the Houthis, adding that "The Houthis, their Iranian masters, and those who knowingly aid and abet their terrorist actions should be put on notice that the world will not accept illicit smuggling of fuel and war material to a terrorist organization."

=== International ===
- Iran: Iran strongly condemned the strikes as "barbaric."
- Hamas: Hamas denounced the strikes as a "blatant aggression."
- Human Rights Watch called the strikes an apparent war crime and should be investigated as such.

== See also ==
- List of massacres in Yemen
