= May 2016 Yemen police bombings =

Yemen police bombings
- Part of the Yemeni civil war (2014–present)
- Location: Mukalla, Hadhramaut Governorate, Yemen
- Date: 15 May 2016
- Target: Security forces
- Attack type: Suicide bombing
- Deaths: 47+ (+1)
- Injuries: 60+
- Perpetrator: Islamic State - Yemen Province
- Motive: Terror

On 15 May 2016, a suicide bombing in the southern Yemeni port city of Mukalla, the capital of the Hadhramaut province, killed at least 47 police and injured over 60. The bombing was preceded by an attack, where 15 Yemeni troops were killed in attacks on army positions outside Mukalla. ISIL said, one of its militants blew up a vehicle, packed with explosives, in an army base in the Khalf district at the city's eastern outskirts.

== Background ==
The U.S. military announced, a week before the attacks, it had deployed a small number of personnel to Yemen, to aid the fight against AQAP, its first troop presence in the country since the Houthi takeover. A year of al-Qaeda rule also ended a month before the attacks. ISIL rarely intervenes in the area, the bombings took place, as it is known to be a stronghold of its al-Qaeda rivals. One day before, troops guarding an army post, in the Khalf district of Mukalla, opened fire at a vehicle, after they suspected its driver of being a suicide bomber, a security official said, adding, that the vehicle sped away. A general boasted, that his forces had captured around 250 al-Qaeda members, since they retook Mukalla and nearby coastal towns, including its commander for the city of Shihr. Iran and Saudi Arabia have also gotten involved in the conflict. ISIL had claimed responsibility for several attacks on government and coalition targets in Aden in the recent months.

== Bombing ==
The first bomber, Abu al-Bara al-Ansari, detonated an explosives belt, as he joined a line of men at a police recruiting centre. The bomb exploded as Hadhramaut's security chief, general Mubarak al-Oubthani, walked out of his office, killing six of his guards, but leaving him with only minor injuries. The attacks included a suicide bombing, that targeted the residence of the commander of Hadhramaut's second military region, general Faraj Salmeen, but he escaped unharmed. The suicide bomber killed at least 41 police recruits and 47 police in total. The bomber also injured over 60 people.

== See also ==
- List of terrorist incidents, January–June 2016
- Yemeni Civil War (2014–present)
- Missionaries of Charity attack in Aden
- 2016 Aden car bombing
- 23 May 2016 Yemen bombings
- June 2016 Mukalla attacks
- August 2016 Aden bombing
- List of massacres in Yemen
