= Dahyan airstrike =

Coalition attack in Yemen

- Part of Saudi Arabian-led intervention in Yemen
- Native name: قصف ضحيان
- Location: 17°03′54″N 43°36′01″E; Dahyan, Sa'dah governorate, Yemen
- Date: 9 August 2018
- Target: Civilian school bus
- Attack type: Airstrike
- Deaths: At least 51 people (per Houthi's Health Ministry)
- Injuries: At least 48 (per the Red Cross); At least 79 people (per Houthi's Health Ministry)
- Perpetrator: (Saudi Arabia) Royal Saudi Air Force

On 9 August 2018, Saudi Arabian expeditionary aircraft bombed a civilian school bus passing through a crowded market in Dahyan, Saada Governorate, Yemen, near the border with Saudi Arabia. At least 40 children were killed, all under 15 years old and most under age 10. Sources disagree on the exact number of deaths, but they estimate that the air strike killed about 51 people.

== Attack ==
According to Save the Children, at the time of the attack the children were on a bus heading back to school from a picnic when the driver stopped to get refreshment at the market in Dahyan. Most of the children were under age 10, according to the International Committee of the Red Cross. A Red Cross–supported hospital in Saada received the bodies of 29 children under 15 years of age and 48 wounded individuals, 30 of whom were children. A total of 40 children were killed in the strike.

According to a resident of Dahyan, the warplanes had been loitering over the area for more than an hour before they attacked. Another witness said, "Our shops were open and shoppers were walking around as usual. All those who died were residents, children and shop owners." According to Yahya Hussein, a teacher who was traveling separately from the bus, "The scene can't be described—there was body parts and blood everywhere." The bomb that killed the children was a 227 kg (500 lb) laser-guided Mk 82 bomb. According to CNN, it had been supplied to Saudi Arabia by the United States in the 2017 United States–Saudi Arabia arms deal under U.S. President Donald Trump. The same week, The Guardian reported that "Based on marking on a fin segment of the bomb, Bellingcat traced the bomb to a shipment of a thousand of such bombs to Saudi Arabia, approved by the State Department in 2015, during the Obama administration".

== Media coverage ==
The attack came to light after videos were posted on Twitter depicting the remains of the bus and the children. Images of the victims were aired on the Al Masirah TV network, highlighting dramatic images of blood and debris-covered children lying on hospital stretchers. The Saudi Arabian coalition later issued a statement saying that they conducted an airstrike in Saada but were targeting Houthi missile launchers. The mass funeral of the children was aired on the Al Mariah TV network, with thousands of Yemenis participating.

== Reactions ==
=== Domestic ===
The official Saudi Arabian press agency called the strike a "legitimate military action" which targeted those who were responsible for a rebel missile attack on the Saudi Arabian city of Jizan on Wednesday. They also claimed that the airstrikes "conformed to international and humanitarian laws" and that Houthis were using children as human shields. Yemeni journalist Nasser Arrabyee reported that there were no Houthis in the vicinity of the strike. A Houthi spokesman said that the coalition showed "clear disregard for civilian life", as the attack had targeted a crowded public place in the city. During the mass funeral of the children, many signs were visible protesting against the United States and Saudi Arabia.

On 1 September 2018, the Saudi Arabian-led coalition admitted mistakes, expressing regrets and pledged to hold those responsible for the strikes accountable.

=== International ===
United Nations Secretary-General António Guterres condemned the attack and called for an independent and prompt investigation, and UNICEF strongly condemned the attack. Also, the secretary-general of the Norwegian Refugee Council Jan Egeland described the incident as a despicable attack, that was clearly a violation of the rules of war. Furthermore, aid agencies have called for a comprehensive investigation into the attack, including other attacks on civilians in the past.

The United States Department of State called for Saudi Arabia to conduct an investigation into the strike. The United Kingdom's Foreign and Commonwealth Office expressed "deep concern", called for a transparent investigation, and called upon all parties to prevent civilian casualties and to co-operate with the UN to reach a lasting political solution in Yemen. UK Foreign Secretary Jeremy Hunt defended the Saudi–British alliance as important in fighting Islamist extremists.

=== Non-governmental organisations ===
The head of the Yemeni delegation of the International Committee of the Red Cross tweeted, "@ICRC_Yemen-supported hospital has received dozens of dead and wounded. Under international humanitarian law, civilians must be protected during conflict."

== See also ==
- 2015 Bombing of Mokha
- 2016 Sana'a funeral airstrike
- List of massacres in Yemen
