= Al Houta district =

Al Hawtah District مديرية الحوطة
- District
- Location in Yemen
- Coordinates: 13°10′N 44°50′E
- Country: Yemen
- Governorate: Lahij

Population (2003)
  - Total: 25,881
- Time zone: UTC+3 (Yemen Standard Time)

Al Hawtah District is a district of Lahij Governorate, Yemen. As of 2003, the district had a population of 25,881 inhabitants.
