= 2018 Riyadh missile strike =

Houthi attack in Saudi Arabia

- Part of the Yemeni Civil War (2014–present) and the Saudi Arabian-led intervention in Yemen
- Location: Riyadh, Saudi Arabia
- Date: 26 March 2018
- Executed by: Houthis
- Casualties: One killed Two injured

On 26 March 2018, Houthi rebels launched a series of seven missiles into Saudi Arabia, targeting the King Khalid International Airport and other sites. Saudi forces claimed to have destroyed all seven missiles, three of them targeting Riyadh, two targeting Jazan, and one targeting Najran. However, according to Jeffrey Lewis, director of the East Asia Nonproliferation Program at CNS, the Saudis failed to intercept the missiles following a malfunction of the MIM-104 Patriot system. One video appeared to show a Patriot missile launch on Sunday night go rapidly wrong, with the missile changing course midair, crashing into a neighborhood in Riyadh and exploding. Another appeared to detonate shortly after being launched in the Saudi capital.

The news channel, Al Arabiya, aired footage that it said showed Patriot missile batteries firing at the incoming Houthi missiles. Online videos showed what appeared to be a missile fuselage lying on a street in Riyadh.

The UN Security Council condemned the attack. An Egyptian man was killed and two others were wounded when a fragment of one of the missiles over Riyadh fell over a neighborhood.

Al Masirah, a Houthi-run satellite news channel, identified some of the missiles fired as the Burkan, or Volcano missile. The United Nations, Western countries and the Saudi-led military coalition fighting in Yemen all said the Burkan mirrors characteristics of an Iranian Qiam ballistic missile. They said that suggests Iran either shared the technology or smuggled disassembled missiles to the Houthis, who then rebuilt them.

A spokesperson for the embassy of the Kingdom of Saudi Arabia said "seven ballistic missiles were shot toward Saudi Arabia from within Yemen." A press conference was held the same day at 1 p.m. "to provide more details about this aggressive act."
