= HMS Diamond =

Several Royal Navy ships have been named HMS Diamond.

- English ship Diamond (1652), a 50-gun ship launched at Deptford in 1652 and captured by France in 1693.
- HMS Diamond (1708), a fifth-rate 50 gun ship launched at Blackwall Yard in 1708 and rebuilt at Deptford Dockyard in 1722, sold in 1744.
- HMS Diamond (1741), a fifth-rate launched at Limehouse in 1741 and sold in 1756.
- HMS Diamond (1774), a fifth-rate launched at Hull in 1774 and sold in 1784.
- HMS Diamond (1794), a fifth-rate launched at Deptford in 1794 and broken up in 1812.
- HMS Diamond (1816), a fifth-rate launched at Chatham in 1816 and broken up following a serious fire at Portsmouth in 1827.
- HMS Diamond (1848), a sixth-rate frigate launched in 1848. She was used as a training ship and renamed Joseph Straker between 1866 and 1868, and sold in 1885.
- HMS Diamond (1874), a 14-gun Amethyst-class corvette launched in 1874 and sold in 1889.
- HMS Diamond (1904), a Topaze-class cruiser built by Cammell Laird, launched in 1904 and scrapped in 1921
- HMS Diamond (H22), a D-class destroyer launched in 1931 and lost in action in 1941.
- HMS Diamond (D35), a Daring-class destroyer launched in 1950 and sold in 1980.
- HMS Diamond (D34), a Type 45 destroyer which began construction in 2005 and was launched on 27 November 2007.

== Battle honours ==
Ships named Diamond have earned the following battle honours:

- Armada, 1588
- Kentish Knock, 1652
- Portland, 1653
- Gabbard, 1653
- Scheveningen, 1653
- Lowestoft, 1665
- Four Days' Battle, 1666
- Orfordness, 1666
- Sole Bay, 1672
- Schooneveld, 1673
- Texel, 1673
- Crimea, 1854–55
- Spartivento, 1940
- Mediterranean, 1941
- Malta Convoys, 1941
- Greece, 1941

The Type 45 destroyer was awarded the Navy Meritorious Unit Commendation by the United States in January 2026 in recognition of its service in the Red Sea and Gulf of Aden as part of Operation Prosperity Guardian.

== See also ==
- Diamond Rock, a rock off Martinique commissioned as HMS Diamond Rock in 1804 and recaptured by the French in 1805.
- HMS Fort Diamond was a six-gun sloop commissioned in 1804 in Martinique to serve as a tender to Diamond Rock and lost to a French privateer in June of that year.
