= August 2016 Aden bombing =

Suicide car bombing in Yemen

August 2016 Aden car bombing
- Part of the Aden unrest and the Yemeni Civil War (2014–present)
- Location of Aden Governorate in Yemen.
- Location: 12.7735°N 45.0265°E; Aden, Aden Governorate, Yemen
- Date: 29 August 2016
- Target: Pro-Hadi army recruits
- Attack type: Suicide car bombings
- Deaths: 71
- Injuries: 67+
- Perpetrator: ISIS

On the morning of August 29, 2016, the Islamic State of Iraq and the Levant conducted a powerful car suicide bombing on an army camp in Aden, Yemen, killing 72 and wounding 67. The attack took place as new military recruits were signing up in a local government school. Despite Al-Qaeda's large presence in the area, the Islamic State of Iraq and the Levant were the only ones to claim responsibility for the bombing.

ISIS claimed responsibility and referred to the bombing as a "martyrdom operation".

== Incident ==
On 29 August 2016, recruits at an army training camp had queued in line for breakfast, which was brought into the compound by a truck. According to military sources, the recruitment was for the Yemeni and Saudi Arabian led coalition army, fighting the Huthi rebels at the northern border with Saudi Arabia.

The suicide bomber, a suspected member of the Islamic State of Iraq and the Levant, entered the compound behind this truck. He then drove his vehicle into the gathering of people, blowing himself up in a suicide car bomb attack and killing himself. The blast also caused a roof to collapse, burying recruits beneath it.

== See also ==
- List of terrorist incidents, 2016
- Yemeni Civil War (2014–present)
- 23 May 2016 Yemen bombings
- June 2016 Mukalla attacks
- May 2016 Yemen police bombings
