= Sanaa crowd crush =

2023 crowd crush in Yemen

- Date: 19 April 2023; 3 years ago
- Location: Old City of Sanaa, Yemen; 15.3495°N 44.219°E
- Cause: Gunfire into electrical wire, causing an accidental explosion
- Deaths: 90+
- Injuries: 322+

On 19 April 2023, a crowd crush occurred in the Old City of Sanaa, the capital of Yemen, after people gathered in front of a school to receive the traditional alms of Zakat al-Fitr before the end of Ramadan. Shots fired by the Houthi militia, ostensibly for crowd control, caused an accidental explosion and panic. At least 90 people died and 322 people were injured in the ensuing crush.

== Background ==
In 2012, Yemeni President Ali Abdullah Saleh, who had ruled for 31 years, was overthrown during the Yemeni Revolution. Post-revolution Yemen suffered a series of incidents and the Iran-backed Houthi movement captured large swaths of territory from government forces, which has led to the ongoing Yemeni civil war, considered a proxy war between Saudi Arabia and Iran. As of April 2023, the country has plunged into "one of the world's largest humanitarian crises" according to UNICEF. According to a March 2023 United Nations High Commissioner for Refugees estimate, at least 80% or 21.6 million people in Yemen are in need of humanitarian assistance, representing almost two-thirds of the country's population.

== Incident ==
The crush happened on 19 April 2023, at about 20:20 in front of a school in the Old City of Sanaa, two days before Eid al-Fitr, the end of Ramadan, when hundreds of people were gathered hoping to receive about 5,000 Yemeni riyals (about US$9) per person as Zakat al-Fitr, from a local merchant in a financial aid distribution event in Houthi-controlled Sanaa. According to eyewitnesses, during the aid distribution, the de facto administration Houthi militia fired shots into the air in an attempt to control the crowd, accidentally hitting an electrical wire, which caused it to explode, creating a panic that led to the crowd collapse. The crowd included women and children, and consisted mainly of low-income people who had gathered for the event organized by merchants.

According to Motaher al-Marouni, a senior health official, at least 90 people died and 13 individuals were critically injured, as reported by the Houthis' Al-Masirah TV channel. Hamdan Bagheri, the deputy director of Sanaa's al-Thowra Hospital, stated that the hospital received at least 73 injured people. At least 322 people were injured.

Following the incident, Houthis promptly sealed off the school and denied access to people, including journalists. Two event organizers were detained.

== Reactions ==
The Houthi-run Interior Ministry said that the crowd crush was caused by the "random distribution of sums of money by some merchants and without coordination with the Ministry of Interior". The Ministry confirmed that it had apprehended the two organizers and had initiated an investigation. The Houthi "General Authority for Zakat" announced that it would compensate each family of the victims with 1,000,000 Yemeni rials (about US$4,000) and each injured person with 200,000 Yemeni rial (about US$800). Other sources reported that the family of a victim would receive a sum of $2,000 and that Sanaa's Union of Chambers of Commerce would compensate each family $5,000.

Saudi-backed media outlet Asharq Al-Awsat accused Houthis of using the opportunity to attack the commercial group which organised the event.

== See also ==
- Crowd collapses and crushes § Crowd "stampedes"
- List of fatal crowd crushes
