= Combined Task Force 153 =

United States Navy-led initiative

The Combined Task Force 153 or CTF 153: Red Sea Maritime Security is a United States Navy-led initiative established on 17 April 2022 to "focus on international maritime security and capacity building efforts in the Red Sea, Bab al-Mandeb and Gulf of Aden." Egypt is a partner with the US in this effort.

The task force operates within Operation Prosperity Guardian. Following increased attacks on international shipping vessels by Houthi rebels in Yemen in beginning October 2023, the force has gained more news coverage. The Houthi movement is considered a proxy of Iran. (Note: See Iran–Israel proxy conflict and Iran–Saudi Arabia proxy conflict) Analysts indicate that these attacks are part of escalating tension in the Middle East region since the beginning of the Gaza war.

== See also ==
- Houthi involvement in the 2023 Israel–Hamas war
