= June 2016 Mukalla attacks =

Series of terrorist attacks in Mukalla, Yemen

- Part of Yemeni Civil War (2014–present)
- Location: Mukalla, Hadhramaut Governorate, Yemen
- Date: 28 June 2016
- Target: Soldiers
- Attack type: Suicide bombings, shootings
- Deaths: 43+ to 50 (+8 attackers)
- Injuries: 37
- Perpetrator: Islamic State - Yemen Province
- Motive: Terror

The June 2016 Mukalla attacks occurred on 28 June 2016. The death toll counts were officially at least 43, with around 37 injured. ISIL claimed, that 8 suicide bombers killed 50 people. There were at least seven separate attacks. The attacks occurred in the Hadhramaut province capital, Mukalla. Al-Qaeda was originally suspected to be behind the attacks. The attacks targeted fasting Yemeni soldiers during Ramadan, not long before they were about to break their fasting. The attack not only killed soldiers, but also civilians, who were mostly passers-by. The death toll is expected to rise. The attacks are another in a series of attacks on soldiers and policemen in urban areas of Yemen.

== Events ==
There were at least six separate attacks, and eight suicide bombers involved. There may have also been other attackers.

- The first attack was a suicide bombing. It occurred when a suicide bomber blew himself up after he asked soldiers if he could eat with them.
- Two suicide bombers were involved in the second attack. They also approached soldiers before blowing themselves up in two separate attacks.
- The fourth attack occurred when two more suicide bombers blew themselves up at the entrance to an army camp.
- Another suicide bomber forced his way into an area where soldiers were preparing to break their fast and eat. He blew himself up and caused a substantial amount of damage.
- Other bombings occurred when attackers posed as distributors for Iftar, handing out food before blowing themselves up.
- Other attacks are also said to have occurred when militants hid bombs in food boxes, and other militants also stormed a police station. Gun-battles broke out throughout the city.

== See also ==
- List of terrorist incidents, January–June 2016
- Yemeni Civil War (2014–present)
- 23 May 2016 Yemen bombings
- 2016 Yemen Police bombings
- August 2016 Aden bombing
- List of massacres in Yemen
