= Badr-1 (rocket) =

Yemeni rocket artillery

The Badr-1 210 mm is a Yemeni military, self-propelled, multiple rocket launcher; a type of rocket artillery, used by Houthis. It features a twin tube launcher mounted on a 6×6 truck.

On 25 August 2019, according to Al Jazeera, Houthis claimed that they fired as many as 10 Badr-1 rockets at an airport in southwest Saudi Arabia. The Saudi-led coalition forces said that they had intercepted at least 6 rockets targeted at civilian population in Jizan.

On 28 October 2018, a guided version called the Badr-1P with a range of 150 kilometres (93 mi) and an accuracy of 3 metres (10 ft) was announced.

== See also ==
- BM-30 Smerch
- KN-09 (MRL)
- Astros II MLRS
- Burkan-2
