= Mualla =

Al-Mu'alla District مُدِيْرِيَّة ٱلْمُعَلَّا Al-Ma'alla District
- District
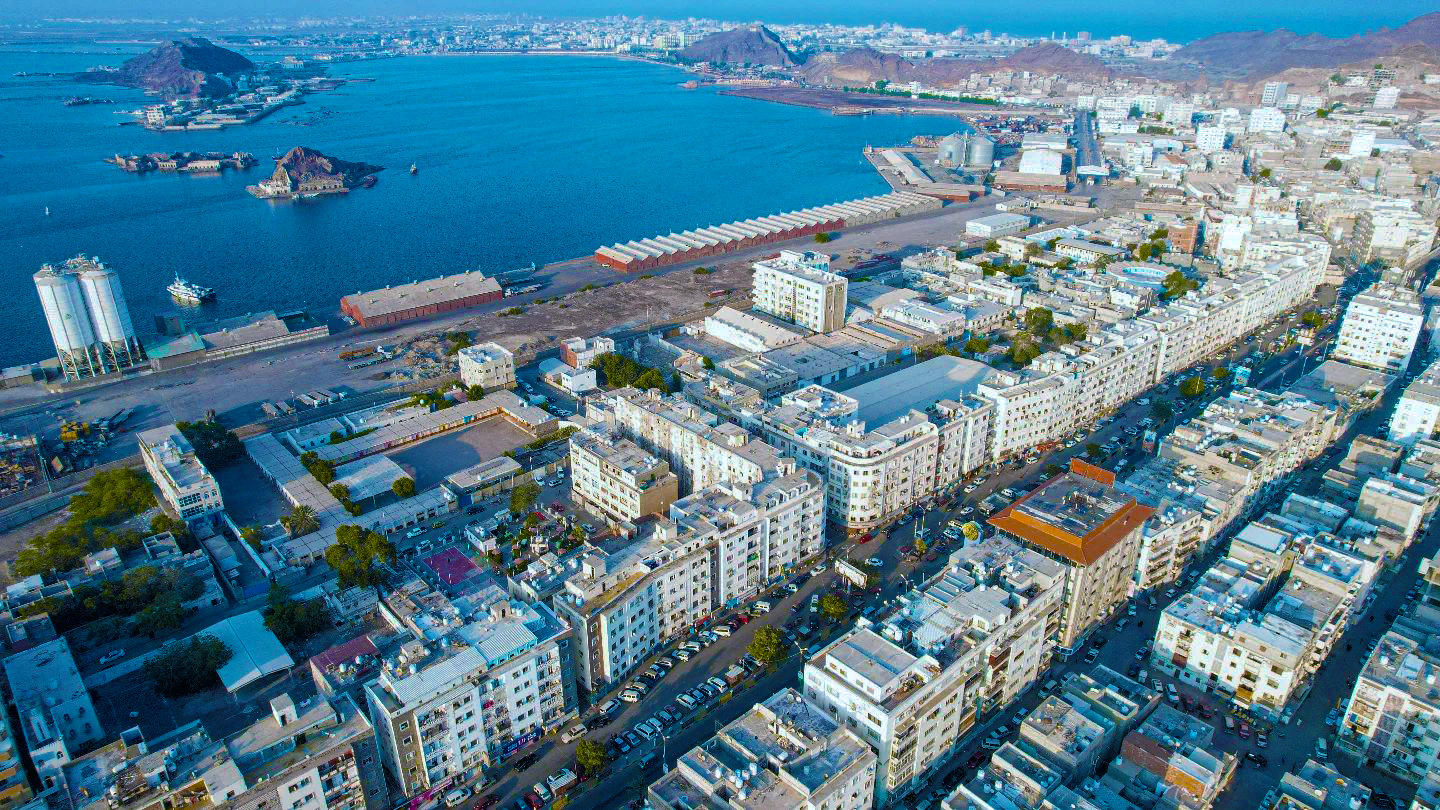
- Aerial view of Mualla

- Location in Yemen Al-Mu'alla District (Middle East) Al-Mu'alla District (Asia)
- Country: Yemen
- Governorate: Aden

Population (2003)
  - Total: 49,891
- Time zone: UTC+3 (Yemen Standard Time)

Mualla (Arabic: ٱلْمُعَلَّا, romanized: Al Ma‘allā’) or Ma'alla (Arabic: ٱلْمَعَلَّا, romanized: Al-Maʿallā) is a city district in Aden Governorate, Yemen. As of 2003, the district had a population of 49,891 inhabitants.

== History ==
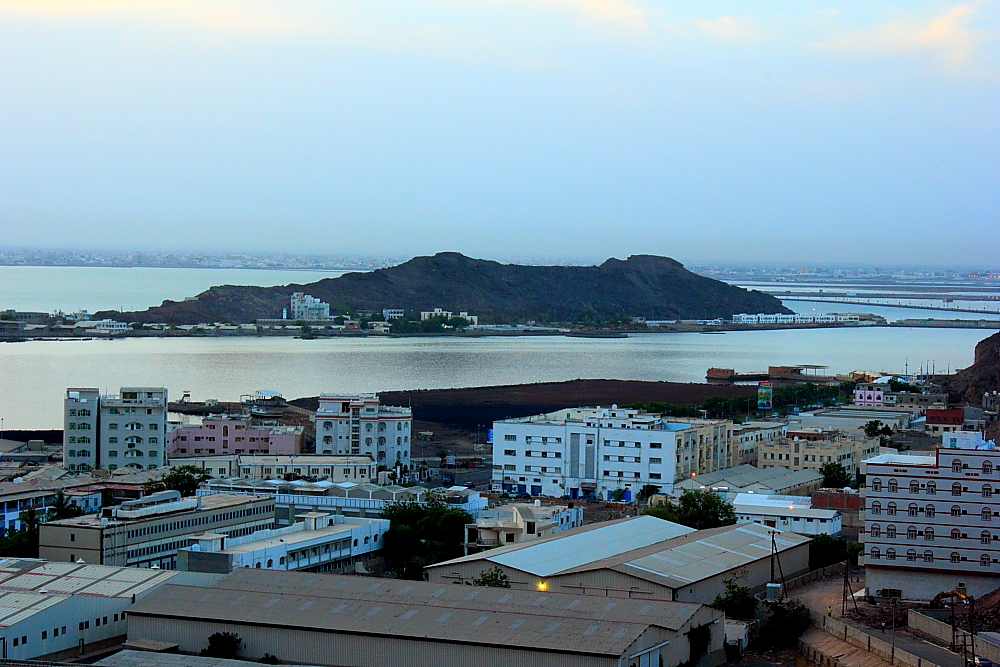
Mualla and the Worker's Island

Mualla's earlier history was notable for its association with dhow building. Later in the nineteenth century Mualla grew to be a port for sailing ships and small steam vessels and number of stores of goods were built along the sidewalks. In the early 1950s the face of the city changed completely by colonial Britain. A large sea area was reclaimed and longest street was built along with modern buildings to absorb the families of British troops.

== Population ==
Its population in 2004 is about 69,842.
