= Battle of Port Midi =

Battle of the Yemeni Civil War

- Part of the Yemeni Civil War (2014–present) and the Saudi Arabian-led intervention in Yemen
Date	Main Battle: 19 December 2015 – 23 January 2016 (1 month and 4 days); Insurgency: Late January 2016 - 1 July 2017 (Only some attacks, Midi still under loyalist occupation, conflict spreads to the rest of the Hajjah Governorate)
Location	Midi District, Hajjah Governorate, Yemen
Result	Hadi-led government/Coalition victory: Port of Midi captured by Hadi loyalists, controlled by Saudi Arabia; Continued insurgency; Conflict spreads to the rest of the Hajjah Governorate

Belligerents
(Yemen) Supreme Revolutionary Committee: Houthis; Security Forces (pro-Houthis); Popular Committees (pro-Houthis); Republican Guard	(Yemen) Hadi-led government: Security Forces (pro-Hadi); Popular Committees (pro-Hadi); Popular Resistance; Saudi Arabia: Special Forces

Commanders and leaders
Unknown	Unknown pro-Hadi commander †; Ali Mohsen al-Ahmar (Saudi Arabia) General Yehia al-Khayati (Saudi Arabia) Suleiman Mukhit

Casualties and losses
127 killed 23 wounded	20+
- 78–129 civilians killed, and 100+ injured all around the Hajjah governorate

The Battle of Port Midi refers to a battle during the Yemeni Civil War between the Saudi coalition-backed Hadi loyalists and the Houthi government. Although the Hadi loyalists seized the port, the Houthi fighters along with the popular committees managed to conduct some attacks around Midi. The conflict also had spillovers in the rest of the Hajjah Governorate. On 26 January 2017, Hadi loyalists extended their control to Harad District in Hajjah Governorate.

== The main battle ==
The battle began on 19 December 2015, when the loyalists captured the Harad district after fierce fighting that left dozens dead on both sides. The port was a very strategic location for the Houthis because Port Midi was used to supply weapons to the capital, Sana'a, and the surrounding area as a launching point for missiles against Saudi Arabian villages. At the end of December, the loyalists advanced very quickly as they managed to capture the surrounding area, pushing the Houthis back. The Houthi fighters suffered airstrikes from the Saudi Arabian coalition.

On 7 January 2016, the loyalists captured Port Midi after reported heavy fighting, but despite losing Port Midi, the Houthis, along with a battalion of troops loyal to former president Ali Abdullah Saleh, maintained control over a long stretch of the coastline.

== Insurgency ==
Situation in Hajjah governorate as of February 9, 2019

On 8 February, popular committees aligned with the Houthi Government attacked Saudi soldiers moving to reinforce the Midi area, destroying at least 2 armored vehicles before escaping.

Four days later, on 12 February, fighters of popular committees backed by the Houthi government shot down a Saudi surveillance plane flying in Midi district, with no reported casualties. On 6 March, Saudi jets launched 11 raids on Midi district, targeting alleged pro-Houthi targets.

In late March, a Saudi airstrike killed more than 78 civilians, including 22 children. The death toll later rose to 107, with some humanitarian organisations claiming that 129 civilians were killed in the airstrikes and more than 100 wounded.

On 10 July, a local pro-Hadi commander was killed by a missile strike launched by pro-Houthi army forces.

On 3 September, Houthi forces launched an offensive in the region, killing at least 11 soldiers and wounding another 28, according to pro-Hadi forces. Saudi warplanes also launched at least 15 airstrikes against the advancing Houthi forces. Reports also emerged that Houthi fighters captured the port from Hadi loyalists.

On 21 September, at least 26 civilians were killed and 60 wounded when missiles from an Arab coalition air strike hit a residential area where rebel leaders were staying in Hodeidah, according to medics and residents.

In mid-November, fifteen loyalists and 23 fighters were killed in the clashes as loyalists launched an attack on three fronts to recapture the town of Midi and nearby Haradh.

On the night of 22 November, three soldiers were killed and four wounded by Houthi sniper fire near Midi. On the other day, fighting around the town of Midi killed 18 Houthis and four government soldiers, according to a loyalist commander on the ground.

On 26 November, pro-Hadi forces announced 22 Houthis were killed in artillery shelling and clashes with government forces in Midi district.

Houthi forces retreated from the contested town of Midi, following clashes on December 5, according to pro-Hadi government sources.

In January 2017, pro-Hadi loyalists pushed back the Houthis and Saleh troops more than 40 km and secured the Midi and Harad fronts. Air and artillery strikes from Saudi and Arab coalition forced the Houthis to retreat. It allowed Pro-Hadi forces to clear a wide area around port of Midi and extend their control up to the interior of Harad district in Hajjah Governorate.

On 30 January 2017, at least 37 Houthis and allied fighters were killed or injured, according to a statement issued by the Yemeni army's Fifth Brigade. Six army personnel had also been killed during fighting in Harad and Midi districts.

On 13 February 2017, at least 8 people from both sides were killed during clashes in Hodeida, a hospital source confirmed.

On 6 March 2017, a Saudi coalition airstrike on a military base in Bajil killed 16 Houthis and wounding 23, said a medical official and a military source.

On 7 March 2017, Houthis attacked Hadi loyalists, killing 6, including a pro-Hadi government officer, Suleiman Mukhit.

On 10 March 2017, an airstrike by Saudi-led coalition on a market in the Red Sea port of Khokha killed 20 civilians and six Houthi fighters.

On 14 March 2017, the pro-government Yemeni Ministry of Defence said on its official news site, that as many as 28 Houthi fighters were killed in Midi District.

On 3 April 2017, pro-government forces captured a major road that connects the town with Haradh and claimed to have stormed some neighborhoods in the town of Midi.

On 1 July 2017, at least 14 Houthi fighters, including a spokesman were killed after pro-government forces repelled their attack in Midi, according to the Yemeni army.
