= 23 May 2016 Yemen bombings =

Terrorist attacks, committed by the Islamic State of Iraq and the Levant, in Yemen

- Part of the Aden unrest and the Yemeni Civil War (2014–present)
- Aden (Yemen)
- Location: Aden, Yemen
- Date: 23 May 2016
- Target: Army recruits, potential army recruits
- Attack type: Multiple bombings, suicide bombings
- Weapon: Bombings
- Deaths: 45+ (+2; possibly more)
- Injuries: 60+
- Perpetrator: Islamic State - Yemen Province
- Motive: Terror

On 23 May 2016, two suicide bombings, conducted by the Islamic State of Iraq and the Levant, killed at least 45 potential army recruits in Aden, Yemen. The first attack, which targeted a lineup, killed 20. The second attack, which occurred inside the base, killed 25. The Islamic State of Iraq and the Levant claimed responsibility for the attack. The attack was preceded by the 2016 Yemen Police bombings in the Yemeni city of Mukalla, which killed more than 48 people and injured over 60.

== See also ==
- List of terrorist incidents, January–June 2016
- Yemeni Civil War (2014–present)
- 2016 Yemen Police bombings
- June 2016 Mukalla attacks
- August 2016 Aden bombing
- List of massacres in Yemen
