= Battle of Dhale =

Battle of the Yemeni Civil War

Coordinates: 13.7050°N 44.7333°E

- Part of the Yemeni Civil War (2014–present) and the Saudi Arabian-led intervention in Yemen
Date	24 March – 26 May 2015 (2 months and 2 days)
Location	Dhale, Yemen
Result	Houthi victory

Belligerents
(Yemen) Houthi government: Houthi fighters; Security Forces (pro-Saleh); Yemeni Republican Guard	(Yemen) Hadi government: Security Forces (pro-Hadi); Southern Movement; People's Committees; Popular resistance; Foreign intervention: Saudi Arabia (leader); Bahrain; Egypt; Jordan; Kuwait; Morocco; Sudan; United Arab Emirates

Commanders and leaders
Abdullah Dabaan (33rd Armoured Brigade commander)	Brig Gen Saleh Salem Saleh † (Yemen) Aidarus Al-Zubaidi

Casualties and losses
163 killed	62 killed
- 46 civilians killed

The Battle of Dhale was a key fight in 2015 for control of Dhale, Yemen, between the Houthis and Yemen Army units loyal to Ali Abdullah Saleh on one side, and militiamen and Yemen Army units loyal to Abd Rabbuh Mansur Hadi on the other side.

== Battle ==
On 24 March, Houthi forces seized administrative buildings in Dhale and were advancing in the city during heavy fighting. A battle for the camp of the 33rd Armoured Brigade ended in the afternoon with 10 anti-Hadi fighters dead. Later, pro-Hadi fighters counter-attacked in the town and beat back the Houthis.

On 30 March, the Houthis entered the city after nearly a week of fighting. The town was reportedly split in half between the two opposing side, while a sheikh in the city stated the Houthis were in control of Dhale, but with sporadic fighting continuing and both sides suffering "a large number of casualties". At this time, a Yemen Red Crescent Society ambulance driver was killed when his vehicle was hit by gunfire.

On 31 March, secessionist fighters allied to Hadi traded artillery fire with the Houthis and army units loyal to Saleh. In addition, repeated air strikes hit Houthi and allied positions, including an ammunition store at a military base. Around 30 Houthi and allied fighters, along with nine southern fighters, were killed during the day.

On 1 April, a pro-Houthi army brigade was said to have "disintegrated" after being pummeled by coalition warplanes. The commander of the 33rd Brigade reportedly fled and groups of pro-Houthi troops withdrew to the north. 10 Hadi militiamen were also killed in street battles. The next day, the town was reported to be under pro-Hadi control, but with Houthi sniper fire continuing.

On 4 April, the Houthis captured the town's central prison and freed 300 inmates who they gave a choice between joining their ranks or remaining incarcerated.

On 5 April, coalition air-strikes targeting Houthi positions in the city hit a residential area and killed five civilians. The next evening, 19 Houthi and 15 pro-Hadi fighters were killed in heavy fighting.

On 8 April, more air-strikes hit Houthi positions in Dhale.

A local official claimed 40 Houthi and three pro-Hadi fighters had been killed in fighting between 12 and 13 April. Three children were also killed when a shell hit their house. On 19 April, more fighting and air-strikes killed 31 Houthi and 17 pro-Hadi fighters.

In the fighting between 22 and 25 April, at least 43 pro-Houthi and eight tribal fighters were killed, according to pro-Hadi sources. On 27 and 28 April, more than 50 fighters on both sides were killed.

Ambushes on 3 and 24 May, left 13 Houthi fighters dead.

On 26 May, pro-Hadi fighters captured Dhale, as well as the command center of the 33rd Armoured Brigade.

On 9 August, pro-Hadi forces captured the rest of Dhale Governorate after heavy fighting for a little more than two months.
