= Yemen Oil and Gas Corporation =

Yemeni government-owned oil and gas company

The Yemen Oil and Gas Corporation (YOGC,المؤسسة اليمنية العامة للنفط والغاز ), a government-owned corporation under the direction of the Ministry of Oil and Minerals of Yemen, is an oil and natural gas exploration and production company headquartered in Sana'a. It was established in 1996.

In April of 2008, YOGC held 15% participation with Medco Yemen, Kuwait Energy, Indian Oil, Oil India, who all signed an agreement with the Ministry of Oil and Minerals of Yemen for the exploration, development and production of Block 82 and Block 83 in Hadhramout Governorate.

In March 2012, the YOGC began a partnership with Total, the Austrian OMV, and the Czech MND for sismic surveys which could lead to drilling explorations in an eastern area of Marib Basin which covers more than 2,954 square kilometers.

YOGC has the following subsidiaries:

- Petroleum Products Distribution Company (YPC or Yemen Petroleum Corporation)
- Yemen Gas Company (YGC)
- Aden Refinery Company (ARC)
- Petroleum Exploration and Production Authority (PEPA)
- SAFER Exploration & Production Operations Company
- Yemen Investments Company for Oil and Minerals (YICOM)
- Yemen Refining Company (YRC)

In 2023, reports emerged about the floating storage and offloading vessel FSO Safer belonging to YOGC which remains unmaintained and polluting the Red Sea since the beginning of the civil war. In March 2023, the United Nations decided to replace it with one of their very large crude carriers (VLCC) to avoid a possible oil spill and environmental catastrophe. Facilities of the Yemen Oil and Gas corporations were attacked by Israel on July 2024.

In 2024, Prime Minister Ahmed Awad bin Mubarak stated that since the Houthi economic war began, Yemen has lost more than $2 billion in revenue because of the stop on oil exports.

== See also ==
- Yemen LNG
