= Dahyan =

Dahyan ضحيان
- Town
- Location in Yemen
- Coordinates: 17°03′40″N 43°36′14″E
- Country: Yemen
- Governorate: Saada
- District: Majz
- Elevation: 1,836 m (6,024 ft)
- Time zone: UTC+3 (Yemen Standard Time)
- Climate: BWh

Dahyan, sometimes rendered as Dhahyan or Duhyan (Arabic: ضحيان), is a town in Saada Governorate in north-western Yemen. It is the birthplace of Badreddin al-Houthi, father of Hussein al-Houthi. During the Saudi-led intervention in Yemen the town was the location of the Dahyan air strike, in which a Saudi Air Force jet dropped a 227 kg (500 lb) laser-guided Mk 82 bomb on a school bus full of young children driving through a crowded marketplace, which killed more than 50 people, most of whom were children.
