= Sanaa funeral airstrike =

2016 airstrike in Yemen

- Part of the Saudi Arabian-led intervention in Yemen and Yemeni Civil War
- Sanaa (Yemen)
- Location: 15°17′22″N 44°12′03″E; Sanaa, Yemen
- Date: 8 October 2016
- Target: Funeral in Sanaa
- Attack type: Airstrike
- Deaths: 143–155
- Injuries: 525+
- Perpetrator: Saudi Arabia

External videos
- Video of the second strike, provided by The Daily Telegraph.

The Sanaa funeral airstrike took place on the afternoon of 8 October 2016 when 155 people were killed and at least 525 more wounded when two airstrikes, about three to eight minutes apart, hit the packed Al Kubra hall in Sanaa, Yemen during a funeral. The attack was the deadliest single bombing in the then-two year long Yemeni civil war. The funeral was being held for the father of former interior minister Jalal al-Rowaishan. Sanaa mayor Abdel Qader Hilal was reportedly among those killed. The Saudi-led coalition initially denied responsibility but then took responsibility and put the blame on information given by the Yemeni government.

The United Nations alleged that the Saudi-led coalition had violated international humanitarian law because the bombing was a 'double tap' attack, or a type of airstrike where the first bombing is followed by a second one soon after, with the aim of targeting the wounded, aid workers, and medical personnel tending to them. The UN report said: "The second air strike, which occurred three to eight minutes after the first air strike, almost certainly resulted in more casualties to the already wounded and the first responders." Saudi Foreign Minister Adel al-Jubeir said that his government was being careful to abide by humanitarian law; however, it stated that its strike on the funeral hall was based on "incorrect information" given to them by the Yemeni government and that it had been carried out without authorization.

Human Rights Watch identified the munitions used in the airstrike as 500-pound laser-guided bombs manufactured by the United States, and called on the U.S. to suspend arms sales to Saudi Arabia.

== Reactions ==
=== Domestic ===
Thousands of Yemenis marched in the capital city on 9 October to protest the air raid and show solidarity to the victims.

=== International ===
- United Nations – Secretary-General Ban Ki-moon called the attack an outrageous violation of international humanitarian law and calling for a full inquiry with consequences for those found culpable. UN humanitarian coordinator Jamie McGoldrick described it as a "horrific attack" and called for an immediate investigation.
- Saudi Arabia – After initially denying it was involved, the country later admitted it had ordered the airstrikes and expressed its deep regret of the attack in the letter from its United Nations mission to the U.N. Security Council. It promised to release the results of its own investigation into the strike and claimed it was careful to abide by international humanitarian law.
- United States – White House National Security Spokesman Ned Price said the country had launched an "immediate review" of its already reduced support for the coalition. "US security cooperation with Saudi Arabia is not a blank check," he said, adding the US was "prepared to adjust our support so as to better align with US principles, values and interests, including achieving an immediate and durable end to Yemen's tragic conflict".
- United Kingdom – The British government said the bombing was "shocking" but that, unlike the US government, it would not be carrying out a review of British support for the Saudi-led coalition. A Foreign Office spokeswoman said that Britain was content for the coalition to carry out its own investigation into its actions. "They have the best insight into their own military procedures and will be able to conduct the most thorough and conclusive investigations," she said.

=== Non-governmental organisations ===
- Human Rights Watch deputy director for Global Advocacy indicated that this bombing continues the observed pattern of Saudi coalition's bombings in Yemen, saying that "the whole war has been marked by attacks on weddings, hospitals, civilian infrastructure, civilian locations, so it fits a pattern. Better late than never, but the world should have woken up a long time ago to this." Human Rights Watch also described the attack as "an apparent war crime."
- Amnesty International spokesperson Sunjeev Bery said: "The Saudi-led coalition has wreaked devastation by striking civilian communities across Yemen with bombs from the skies. Saturday's horrible bloodbath at the funeral hall in Sanaa is only the latest atrocity in this conflict. Since the conflict began in March 2015, markets hospitals, weddings, homes mosques and now [a] funeral gathering have been hit. The attack appears to be the latest in a string of unlawful attacks targeting civilian gatherings."
- Oxfam policy adviser Scott Paul said: "This was a massacre of civilians. It is telling that, after initially denying responsibility wholesale, Saudi Arabia announced an investigation into the attack with support from US experts. Not for the first time, Saudi Arabia is using US support to legitimise its heinous conduct and deflect international criticism".

== See also ==
- Hroza missile attack – 2023 Russian airstrike in Ukraine; launched at a memorial service
- List of massacres in Yemen
