= 2016 Aden car bombing =

Terrorist attack in Aden, Yemen

- Part of the Aden unrest and the Yemeni Civil War (2014–present)
- Location of Aden Governorate in Yemen.
- Location: Aden, Aden Governorate, Yemen
- Date: 25 March 2016
- Attack type: Suicide car bombings
- Deaths: 17 soldiers, 10 civilians
- Injuries: Dozens
- Perpetrator: Islamic State - Yemen Province
- Motive: Terrorism

At least 27 people were killed in a triple suicide car bomb explosion that hit roadblocks guarded by loyalist forces in Aden, the largest city in southern Yemen, where several jihadist organizations are active. Two car bombs exploded in al-Shaab, west of Aden, and an ambulance exploded near a checkpoint in the center of the city of Mansoura, declared "provisional" capital of Yemen, since its resumption in July 2015 by pro-government forces, after their fight against the Shiite Houthi rebels. The Yemeni branch of the Islamic State of Iraq and the Levant claimed responsibility for the attack.
