= War crimes in the Yemeni civil war (2014–present) =

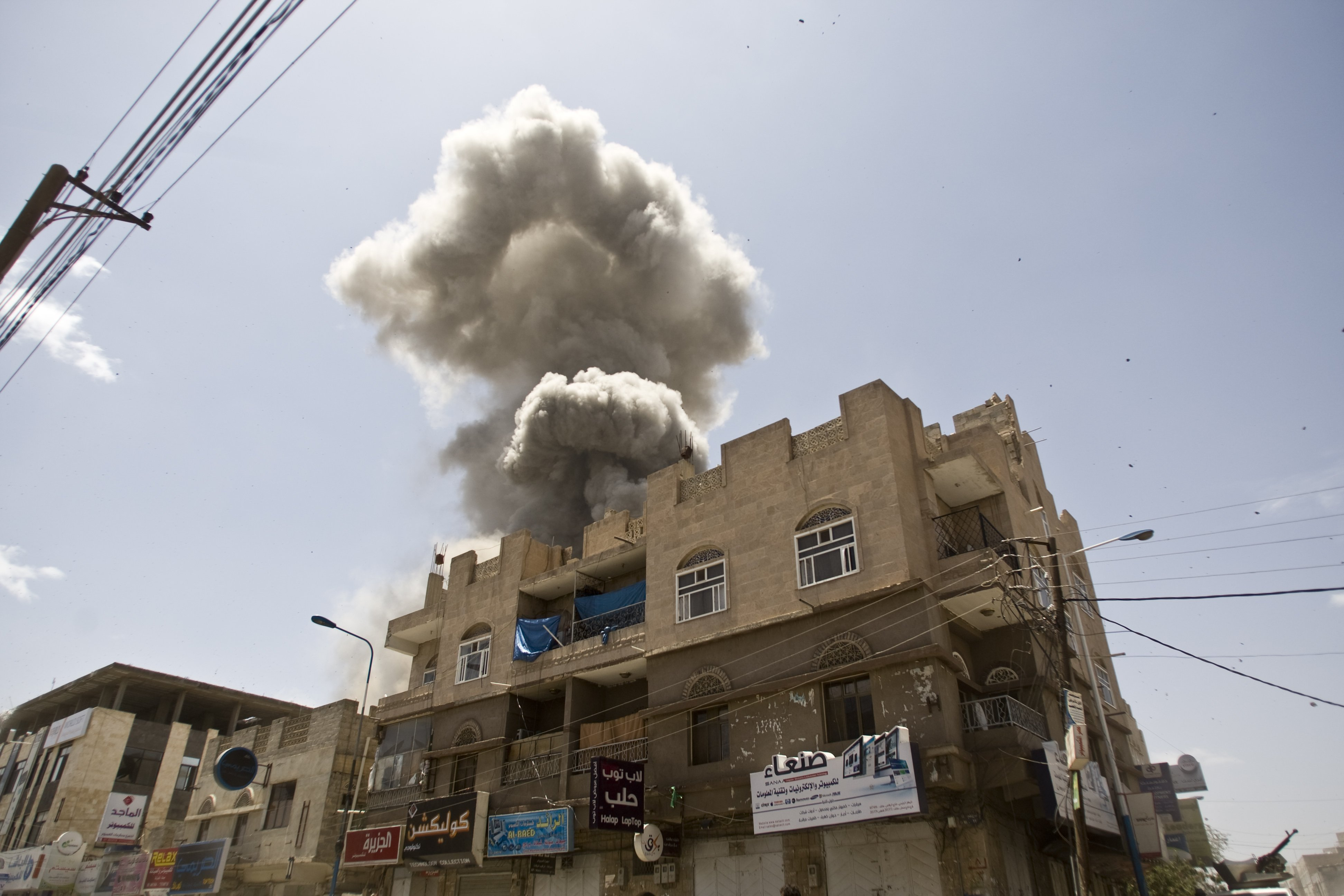
Saudi Arabian airstrike on Sana'a, March 2016

War crimes and human rights violations, committed by all warring parties, have been widespread throughout the Yemeni civil war. This includes the two main groups involved in the ongoing conflict: forces loyal to the current Yemeni president, Abdrabbuh Mansur Hadi (supported by the Saudi-Arabia-led coalition), and Houthis and other forces supporting Ali Abdullah Saleh, the former Yemeni president. Al-Qaeda in the Arabian Peninsula and the Islamic State of Iraq and the Levant have also carried out attacks in Yemen. The Saudi-led coalition, backed by the United States and other nations, has also been accused of violating human rights and breaking international law, especially in regards to airstrikes that repeatedly hit civilian targets.

The use of force by these groups has exacerbated the humanitarian crisis situation in Yemen, as critical infrastructure has been damaged or destroyed in attacks. In addition to the attacks, blockades of critical resources, such as fuel, to Yemen by Saudi Arabia have hindered the transport of food in Yemen, and the ability of civilians to travel to locations where there are adequate medical facilities.

In August 2018, a report by UN experts said all parties to the conflict may have committed war crimes, including the governments of Yemen, the United Arab Emirates and Saudi Arabia, and the Houthis. The UN described the conflict as the world's worst humanitarian crisis. The report documented 6,475 deaths in the conflict, but estimated the true number was significantly higher. The report criticized Saudi-led airstrikes and accused parties of unlawful violations such as "deprivation of the right to life, arbitrary detention, rape, torture, enforced disappearances and child recruitment." In September 2020, another UN report said the combatant parties in Yemen continue to ignore international law and exhibit little regard for human rights. It went on to accuse the United Kingdom, Canada, France, Iran, the United Arab Emirates, Saudi Arabia, and the United States of prolonging the conflict by supplying the country with arms. The situation in Yemen has been described as "one of the worst crises in the world" by the United Nations Humanitarian Coordinator for Yemen.

== Legal framework ==
Yemen and the Saudi-led coalition are parties to Common Article 3 of the 1949 Geneva Conventions and an Additional Protocol on the Protection of Victims of Non-International Armed Conflicts, which is binding on all groups party to a conflict, and seeks to ensure that forces undertake precautions to avoid hitting civilian and medical targets. Under the Protocol on the Protection of Victims of Non-International Armed Conflicts, parties to a conflict must not attack "[m]edical and religious personnel", "[m]edical units and transports", and "[t]he civilian population and individual civilians". Customary international humanitarian law also prohibits indiscriminate attacks in international and non-international conflicts.

== War crimes by regional groups ==
Regional groups have been accused of indiscriminate attacks, often resulting in the deaths of civilians, and at times, of limiting the ability of civilians to import goods and arbitrarily detaining protesters. The rights to life and to security of person, not to be arbitrarily deprived of one's property, and not to be arbitrarily detained are protected by the Universal Declaration of Human Rights and can be argued to have been breached by these regional groups.

=== Houthis ===
==== 2015–2016 ====
According to Amnesty International, members of the pro-Hadi and Houthi factions have often attacked each other from residential areas, which places civilians in danger of becoming caught up in the fighting. Some victims of these attacks have been children, who were caught up in conflict in Aden, as a result of the forces not ensuring that civilians would not be harmed, and using weapons such as unguided rockets, which can be inaccurate, especially in residential areas. These attacks have been said to violate international law, as the forces have often not taken sufficient precautions to ensure the safety of civilians, particularly in residential areas. In addition to the use of rockets, Houthis have been accused of laying landmines, which can gravely endanger civilians. The use of these mines has alarmed human rights groups, the use of anti-personnel mines was banned in Yemen as a result of the Mine Ban Treaty. Members of local human rights groups have reported finding 1,170 unexploded mines in around a month. Human Rights Watch stated that pro-Houthi fighters may have committed war crimes when two women were killed in Yemen and aid workers were arrested for two weeks.

According to Amnesty international annual report 2015–2016, Houthis and allied forces loyal to former President Saleh have expanded their arbitrary arrests, detentions and abductions of government supporters, activists, and human rights defenders. The international organisation said that many detainees were held in an inappropriate and unofficial detention center. In October, Armed men belonging to Houthi militia arrested at least 25 men while attending a meeting at Ibb hotel. Most of them were released later after being tortured.

There are concerns around freedom of speech in Houthi controlled areas, after reports of arbitrary detention of protestors and activists emerged. Journalists have also been kidnapped by Houthi and other forces, and the Committee to Protect Journalists has called for an investigation into the treatment of journalists in Yemen.

In addition to accusations of indiscriminately firing on Yemeni civilians, attacks on Saudi Arabian civilians have been attributed to the Houthis. Rockets allegedly fired by Houthis killed two Saudi Arabian girls in late August 2016, and injured five others. Some Saudi Arabian locals have expressed the view that these attacks may be the Houthis exerting pressure on the Saudi Arabian government to end the war.

==== 2017–2019 ====
On 17 March 2017, Houthi forces launched a missile at a mosque, which killed at least 22 pro-government worshippers. That same month, Human Rights Watch "documented 62 apparently unlawful coalition airstrikes, some of which may amount to war crimes, that have killed nearly 900 civilians, and documented seven indiscriminate attacks by Houthi-Saleh forces in Aden and Taizz that killed 139 people, including at least eight children."

The United Nations World Food Programme has accused the Houthis of diverting food aid and illegally removing food lorries from distribution areas, with rations sold on the open market or given to those not entitled to it. The WFP has also warned that aid could be suspended to areas of Yemen under the control of Houthi rebels due to "obstructive and uncooperative" Houthi leaders that have hampered the independent selection of beneficiaries. WFP spokesman Herve Verhoosel stated "The continued blocking by some within the Houthi leadership of the biometric registration ... is undermining an essential process that would allow us to independently verify that food is reaching ... people on the brink of famine". The WFP has warned that "unless progress is made on previous agreements we will have to implement a phased suspension of aid". The Norwegian Refugee Council has stated that they share the WPF frustrations and reiterate to the Houthis to allow humanitarian agencies to distribute food.

On 1 September 2019, the Houthis were reported to have used human shields during the Dhamar airstrike by putting detainees near weapons storage facilities.

On 7 October 2019, Yemeni health officials said an explosive device blasted in Wadi Nakhla, Hudaydah, killing at least four children, and wounding two others. The officials blamed Houthi rebels for the blast.

==== 2020–present ====
On 30 June 2020, a report by Yemeni human rights group Mwatana documented since May 2016, more than 1,600 cases of arbitrary detentions, 770 forced disappearances, 344 cases of torture and at least 66 deaths in unofficial prisons. The report stated that Houthis were responsible for most abuses. It blamed them for 350 forced disappearances, 138 incidents of torture, and 27 deaths in detention, while UAE-backed forces, including the Southern Transitional Council, were responsible for 327 disappearances, 141 cases of torture, and 25 deaths in detention. The report blamed forces loyal to the Saudi-backed Yemeni government for 65 cases of torture and over 24 deaths.

On 14 September 2020, Human Rights Watch wrote that Houthis have a "particularly egregious record of obstructing aid agencies from reaching civilians in need".

Three leaders of the Houthi movement were to be designated as the Specially Designated Global Terrorists by the US Secretary of State Mike Pompeo. This announcement of January 2021 raised concerns amongst the aid workers and diplomats, who pointed that the move would create problems in the peace process and in providing aid in Yemen.

===== Use of child soldiers =====
In January 2022, AP News reported that U.N. experts said in a new report that nearly 2,000 children recruited by Yemen's Houthi rebels died on the battlefield between January 2020 and May 2021, and the Iranian-backed rebels continue to hold camps and courses encouraging youngsters to fight. In the report to the U.N. Security Council circulated Saturday, the experts said they investigated some summer camps in schools and a mosque where the Houthis disseminated their ideology and sought to recruit children fight for them against the internationally recognized government of Yemen.

==== Support by Iran ====
Iran has been accused of supporting Houthis by supplying them with military aid and resources. Iran has denied these accusations. Iran was also named by a 2020 UN report as one of the many countries exacerbating Yemen's humanitarian crisis.

==== Monopoly over Humanitarian operations through SCMCHA ====
In 2019, the Houthis established the Supreme Council for the Management and Coordination of Humanitarian Affairs and International Cooperation (SCMCHA), as a successor to the "National Authority for the Management and Coordination of Humanitarian Affairs and Disaster Response" (NAMCHA), which had been created by them also in mid-October 2017. SCMCHA is a Houthi-controlled body overseeing humanitarian aid in areas under their control. According to the Arab Center Washington DC, local civil society actors and humanitarian workers have expressed concerns regarding SCMCHA's role. Many have reported that the organisation's primary functions include gathering intelligence on independent humanitarian groups, imposing restrictions on local and international aid organisations, and deducting funds from international aid allocations. SCMCHA maintained a monopoly over humanitarian activities in Houthi-controlled areas, requiring civil society groups to adhere to Houthi regulations and operate under strict supervision. Furthermore, according to Crown Center for Middle East Studies, SCMCHA also exercised authority over staff appointments across civil society, including in INGOs. International humanitarian organisations have criticised SCMCHA's practices. In February 2020, a dispute arose between the Houthis and UN agencies after Houthi authorities demanded a 2% tax on all UN humanitarian programmes. The dispute led to a temporary suspension of aid by international donors, prompting the Houthis to abandon the taxation plan, which allowed aid to resume. Houthi authorities have reportedly implemented alternative methods to derive financial benefits from humanitarian aid. For example, during Ramadan in 2022, they issued an order prohibiting donations outside their control and requiring licenses for such activities. Observers have noted that international aid organisations, committed to impartiality, often comply with Houthi directives, inadvertently enabling the group to benefit from aid intended for vulnerable populations and local organisations. A recent report by the Counter Extremism Project (CEP) highlighted that aid diversion by the Houthis has been a persistent issue for nearly a decade. The report also noted that SCMCHA was dissolved on 9 October 2024, with its responsibilities transferred to the Houthi Ministries of Foreign Affairs and Labour and Social Affairs. The disbandment of SCMCHA may have been influenced by international pressure on humanitarian organisations to cease cooperation with the agency due to its alleged interference and diversion of aid.

=== Enforced disappearance of NGO and humanitarian staff ===
Since 31 May 2024, Houthi security forces in Yemen have reportedly arrested and forcibly disappeared dozens of people, including at least 13 United Nations (UN) staff members and numerous employees of Non-governmental organization (NGOs) operating in Houthi-controlled territories, according to a report by Human Rights Watch (HRW). These detentions appear to target individuals based on their current or past employment. Human Rights Watch described the arrests as a political tool, with researcher Niku Jafarnia stating, "The Houthis are using arbitrary detentions and enforced disappearances as a political tool at a time when the people living in their territories lack even the most basic needs." Human Rights Watch interviewed 20 individuals with knowledge of the arrests, as well as four Yemen analysts. The detainees were reportedly taken without warrants, and their families were not informed of their whereabouts. The detainees have been held incommunicado, denied access to lawyers, and refused contact with their families, meeting the criteria for enforced disappearances under international law. Despite inquiries from Human Rights Watch, the Houthi authorities have not responded, and no formal charges have been brought against the detainees. However, past cases suggest the Houthis may bring politically motivated charges, such as espionage. In one high-profile incident, Houthi authorities detained the husband and two children of a woman working with a civil society organization. Additionally, detainees have been denied medical supplies, even for serious health conditions, raising further concerns about their well-being. Since 10 June 2024, Houthi-affiliated media outlets, including the Al-Masirah TV channel, have aired videos showing Yemeni men detained between 2021 and 2023. These videos depict coerced confessions, with the men alleging they spied for the United States and Israel. Human Rights Watch highlighted the lack of credibility of these confessions, noting the Houthis’ history of using torture to extract statements. Analysts fear that the recent arrests may be linked to attempts to frame the detainees as part of a supposed "spy network." The UN and other international bodies have called for the immediate release of detainees. UN Secretary-General, António Guterres, and High Commissioner for Human Rights, Volker Türk, have expressed particular concern for the detained UN and NGO staff. However, sources told Human Rights Watch that some UN agencies and NGOs have not adequately supported the families of detainees, prompting criticism. According to Amnesty International, the recent wave of arrests by Houthi authorities has created an atmosphere of fear among civil society workers, who now feel increasingly at risk of arrest or reprisal for carrying out their duties. These arrests coincided with a Houthi-led media campaign accusing humanitarian organizations and their staff of "conspiring" against Yemen's interests through their projects. Amnesty International also reported that the Houthis have a history of targeting human rights and humanitarian workers. Four Yemeni staff members from the Office of the High Commissioner for Human Rights (OHCHR) and UNESCO, arrested in 2021 and 2023, remain arbitrarily detained and have been held incommunicado since their arrests. In another case, in September 2023, Houthi authorities arrested Hisham Al-Hakimi, the Safety and Security Director at Save the Children. Al-Hakimi was held incommunicado and died on 25 October 2023 while still in arbitrary detention. Human Rights Watch urged the international community, including mediating countries like Oman, to intensify efforts to secure the release of the detainees and hold the Houthis accountable for their actions.

On 23 January 2025, the Houthi authorities detained additional United Nations personnel operating in areas under their control. In response, the United Nations announced the suspension of all official movements into and within Houthi-controlled territories. The suspension will remain in effect until further notice.

=== Sunni militant groups ===
The Islamic State of Iraq and the Levant has carried out indiscriminate attacks in Yemen. In March 2015, the bombing of two mosques in Sana'a which killed around 140 people, were claimed by the Islamic State. This type of attack has continued further into the civil war: in southern Yemen there have been reports of car bombings and published videos of executions of Yemeni shia Muslims. According to these reports, the strength of the Islamic State in Yemen has increased since the beginning of the conflict. In May 2016, Islamic State claimed responsibility for a suicide attack in Mukalla which killed 25 Yemeni police recruits at a training compound. On 29 August 2016, the Islamic State claimed responsibility for a suicide attack on a training camp in Aden which was being used by pro-government militia known as Popular Resistance. As of August 2016, reports suggested that at least 54 people were killed and 60 injured in the attack.

Al-Qaeda in the Arabian Peninsula has also been using the political situation in Yemen to their advantage: they have captured cities from government groups, and are thought to be using the conflict to gain more recruits. However, United States officials have claimed that Islamic State now presents a higher risk than al-Qaeda.

== War crimes by the Saudi Arabian–led intervention ==
Airstrikes in Yemen apparently violating the laws of war (selection) HRW investigation of 10 Saudi-led coalition airstrikes, that took place between 11 April–30 August 2015. HRW found either no evident military target, or the attacks failed to distinguish civilians and military objectives, in violation of the laws of war.
date (in 2015)	location / governorate	objectives or targets struck	civilians killed (at least)				civilians injured
date (in 2015)	location / governorate	objectives or targets struck	men	women	children	total	civilians injured
11 April	Amran / Amran	buildings in the town	1	2	1	4	1
12 May	Abs / Hajjah	Abs/Kholan Prison and other buildings in the town	21	1	3	25	18
12 May	Zabid / Al Hudaydah	Shagia market and lemon grove in the town	39	13	8	60	155
4 July	Muthalith Ahim / Al Hudaydah	marketplace in the village	?	?	3	65	105
6 July	Amran	1. Bawn market between Amran und Raydah; 2. Jawb market outside the town	13	1	15	29	20
12 July	Sanaʽa-Sawan / Sanaʽa	muhamashee residential neighborhood	2	7	14	23	31 people
19 July	Yarim / Ibb	residential homes and buildings in the town	4	3	9	16	16
24 July	Mokha / Taiz	residential compound of Mokha Steam Power Plant	42	13	10	65	55
8 August	Shara'a / Ibb	homes in the village (Radhma district)	2	3	3	8	2
30 August	Abs / Hajjah	Al-Sham Water Bottling Factory in the outskirts of the town	11		3	14	11
civilian airstrike casualties for all 10 airstrikes, investigated by HRW (report of 26 November 2015)			309				414

Various groups have accused Saudi Arabian-led intervention in Yemen, of human rights violations and some have gone as far as accusing the coalition of war crimes. The majority of these accusations stem from airstrikes undertaken by the coalition, but others, including the UN Special Rapporteur on the Right to Food, have also criticised the coalition's approach to blockades. The UN Special Rapporteur on the Right to Food claimed "the deliberate starvation of civilians in both international and internal armed conflict may constitute a war crime, and could also constitute a crime against humanity in the event of deliberate denial of food and also the deprivation of food sources or supplies." A 2019 United Nations report said the US, UK and France may be complicit in committing war crimes in Yemen by selling weapons and providing other support to the Saudi-led coalition which is using the deliberate starvation of civilians as a tactic of warfare.

A September 2020 UN report further accused members of the coalition (including the United Kingdom, Canada, France, the United Arab Emirates, Saudi Arabia, and the United States) of prolonging the conflict by supplying the country with arms.

=== Targeting and killings of civilians ===
==== 2015 ====
On 13 April, Human Rights Watch (HRW) wrote that the Saudi-led air campaign that began on 26 March 2015, had "conducted airstrikes in apparent violation of the laws of war, such as the March 30 attack on a displaced person camp in Mazraq, northern Yemen, that struck a medical facility and a market". HRW also said that the Houthis had "unlawfully deployed forces in densely populated areas and used excessive force against peaceful protesters and journalists". In addition, HRW said that by providing logistical and intelligence assistance to coalition forces, "the United States may have become a party to the conflict, creating obligations under the laws of war". Other incidents noted by HRW that had been deemed as "indiscriminate or disproportionate" or "in violation of the laws of war" were: a strike on a dairy factory outside the Red Sea port of Hodaida (31 civilian deaths); a strike that destroyed a humanitarian aid warehouse of the international aid organization Oxfam in Saada;

Throughout April and May, Amnesty International said that several Saudi Arabian-led airstrikes hit five densely populated areas (Saada, Sanaa, Hodeidah, Hajjah and Ibb), and "raise concerns about compliance with the rules of international humanitarian law". They also said that at least 139 people, including at least 97 civilians (33 of whom were children) were killed during these strikes, and 460 individuals were injured (at least 157 whom were civilians).

A group of 17 aid agencies working in Yemen condemned the growing intensity of airstrikes in the north of Yemen on 8 and 9 May 2015. Save the Children's Country Director in Yemen, Edward Santiago, said that the "indiscriminate attacks after the dropping of leaflets urging civilians to leave Sa'ada raises concerns about the possible pattern being established in breach of International Humanitarian Law". Euro-Mediterranean Human Rights Monitor has claimed that Houthi militias in alliance with the militants of exiled former president Ali Abdullah Saleh killed purposely at least 22 civilians in Taiz. According to eyewitnesses, the militants launched Katyusha rockets targeting the markets and residential neighborhoods in the center of Taiz. As a result, many civilians were killed and wounded. Houthi media denied the accusation, accusing Saudi and IS of committing these attacks.

U.N. Humanitarian Coordinator for Yemen, Johannes van der Klaauw, said that air strikes by the Saudi-led coalition on Sa'ada city in May 2015, where many civilians were trapped, were in breach of international humanitarian law, despite calls for civilians to leave the area. Scores of civilians were reportedly killed and thousands forced to flee their homes after the Saudi-led coalition declared the entire governorate a military target, he said. Van der Klaauw also said that coalition strikes had targeted schools and hospitals, in breach of international law.

Between 26 March and 21 April, The New York Times confirmed 18 airstrikes that resulted in civilian casualties, and on 6 May, HRW reported that an airstrike struck a residential home in Saada, killing 27 members of one family, including 17 children. On 26 May, 7 more members of the same family were killed in another airstrike.

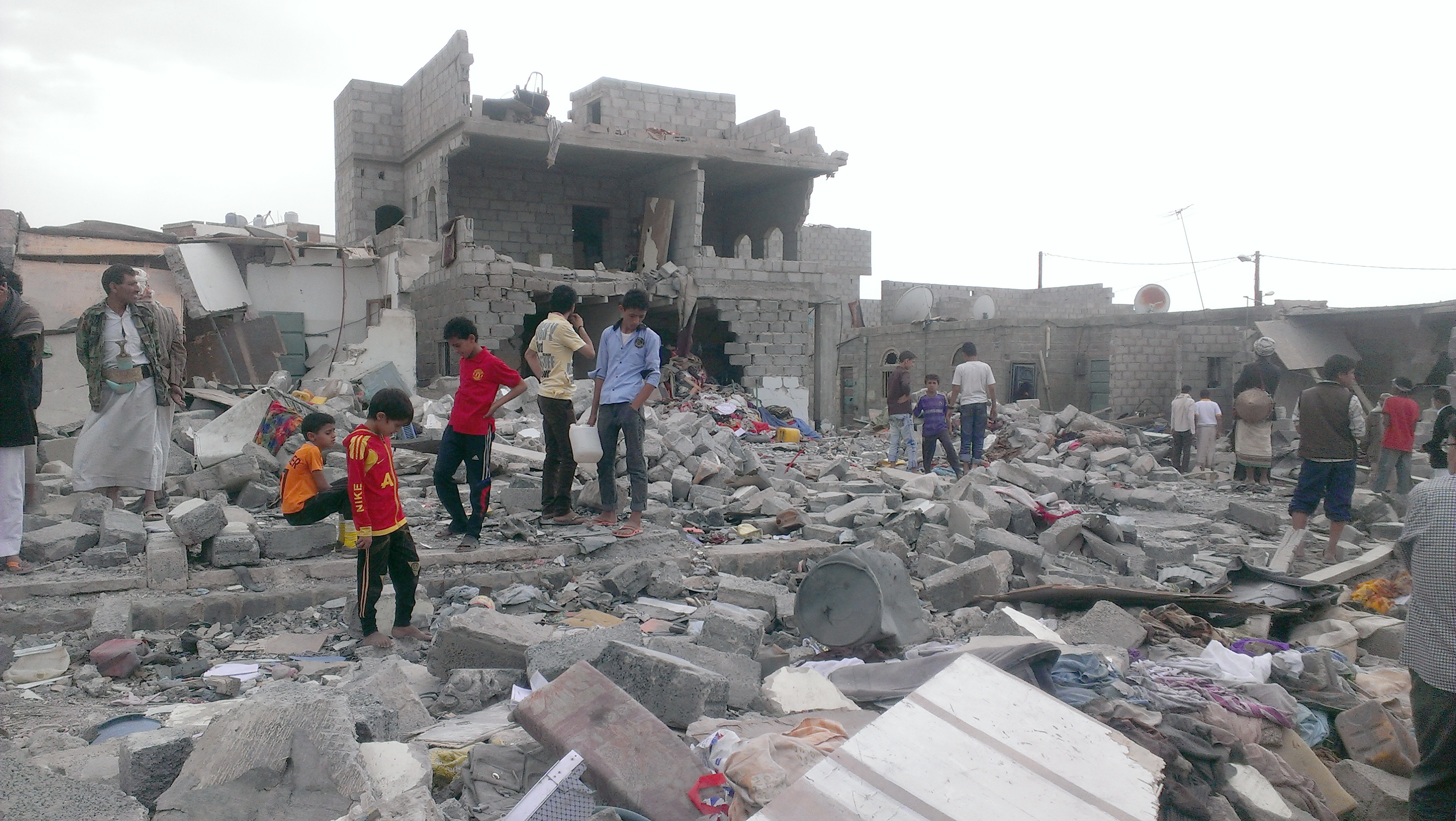
Yemeni capital Sanaa after airstrikes, 9 October 2015

On 27 May nearly 100 people were killed due to airstrikes hitting Sanaa, Sa'da and Hodeida in the largest ever one-day death toll throughout the conflict.

On 28 June a coalition airstrike hit and damaged the UN compound in Aden, severely damaging the UNDP building and injuring a guard.

On 30 June HRW released a report stating that coalition airstrikes on the northern Yemeni city of Saada, a Houthi rebel stronghold, had killed dozens of civilians and wrecked homes and markets. The group said it had documented a dozen airstrikes on Saada that destroyed or damaged civilian homes, five markets, a school and a petrol station although there was no evidence of military use. "Saada City's streets are littered with bomb craters, destroyed buildings, and other evidence of coalition airstrikes," HRW's Sarah Leah Whitson said in the report and later added. "These attacks appear to be serious laws-of-war violations that need to be properly investigated."

On 6 July airstrikes killed over 100 people including more than 30 civilians in Al Joob, Amran. A state-run news agency said that 40 had been killed in a raid on a livestock market in al-Foyoush. Local residents also reported 30 deaths in a raid they said apparently targeted a Houthi checkpoint on the main road between Aden and Lahj. They said 10 of the dead were Houthi fighters. MSF head of mission in Yemen said "It is unacceptable that airstrikes take place in highly concentrated civilian areas where people are gathering and going about their daily lives, especially at a time such as Ramadan."

On 25 July airstrikes killed over 120 civilians in the town of Mokha, marking the deadliest strike yet against civilians. The airstrikes hit workers' housing for a power plant in Mokha, flattening some of the buildings, the officials said. A fire erupted in the area, charring many of the corpses. "It just shows what is the trend now of the airstrikes from the coalition," said Hassan Boucenine of the Geneva-based Doctors Without Borders. "Now, it's a house, it's a market, it's anything." He added that many of the workers had families visiting for the Eid al-Fitr holiday at the end of the holy month of Ramadan. Mokha, populated largely by fishermen, had a reputation as one of the safest places in the country embroiled in war, said Boucenine.

On 18 August, Amnesty International reported that it had confirmed 141 civilian deaths from eight airstrikes.

On 24 August, the UN special representative of the secretary-general for children and armed conflict said, that of 402 children killed in Yemen since late March 2015, 73 percent were victims of Saudi coalition-led airstrikes. Mondoweiss reported that the UN also said at this time that an average of 30 people had been killed in Yemen every single day since the beginning of the war. On top of this, more than 23,000 had been wounded. On 11 September 2015, UN Human Rights Commissioner said that of 1,527 civilians killed between 26 March and 30 June, at least 941 people were killed by airstrikes carried out by the Saudi-led coalition.

On 11 September, UN Human Rights Commissioner said that of 1,527 civilians killed between 26 March and 30 June, at least 941 people were killed by airstrikes carried out by the Saudi-led coalition. On 27 October, the OHCHR said that out of 2,615 civilians killed between 26 March and 26 October 2015, 1,641 civilians had reportedly been killed due to airstrikes carried out by the Saudi-led coalition.

In December 2015, HRW claimed that six "unlawful airstrikes" were carried out in the capital by the Saudi-led coalition in September and October, which killed 60 civilians. They also criticized the Coalition and the United States for refusing to investigate the attacks. On 8 October 2016, a Saudi-led airstrike on a funeral ceremony killed roughly 100 people and injured 500, including children. HRW described the airstrike as an apparent war crime.

==== 2016 ====
According to a UN report released in early 2016, it is believed that the Saudi Arabian-led coalition could be deliberately targeting civilians. Human Rights Watch has identified several airstrikes which have hit civilian targets: an attack on a camp for displaced people, and a dairy factory. Médecins Sans Frontières claims it was attacked four times in three months by coalition forces. In addition to these targets, the UN panel who worked on the report also claimed that the coalition targeted "civilian gatherings, including weddings; civilian vehicles, including buses; civilian residential areas; medical facilities; schools; mosques; markets, factories and food storage warehouses; and other essential civilian infrastructure, such as the airport in Sana'a, the port in Hudaydah and domestic transit routes", and concluded this was in violation of international law. The panel also concluded that airstrikes contributed to 60% of civilian deaths since the beginning of the conflict. At the end of August 2016, the United Nations revised the number of deaths during the war from around 6,000 to at least 10,000, and the U.N. Humanitarian Coordinator noted the difficulty in providing an exact number of people killed during the conflict.

On 1 February 2016 Reuters reported: "Mortars and rockets fired at Saudi Arabian towns and villages have killed 375 civilians, including 63 children, since the start of the Saudi-led military campaign in Yemen in late March, Riyadh said."

On 15 March 2016 Saudi-led airstrikes on a market in Mastaba killed at least 119 people, including 25 children.

In late September 2016, it was reported that a Saudi airstrike had hit a residential area in Al Hudaydah, killing at least 25 people and injuring 70. A government official told AFP news agency that the area was probably accidentally hit while Saudi Arabian forces were targeting what they believed to be a Houthi stronghold.

In October 2016, Saudi Arabian forces were accused of being responsible for airstrikes on funeral procession, resulting in the deaths of at least 140 people. Initial reports indicated that a further 525 people were injured in the airstrikes. The funeral was for the father of Houthi-appointed Interior Minister Galal al-Rawishan. Sources in Yemen claimed that due to the number of casualties, the medical staff in Sana'a was overwhelmed and doctors who were off duty had to be called in to assist. As of 9 October 2016, the final number of casualties is unknown, but it is likely the attack is one of the most deadly since the beginning of the Yemeni Civil War in March 2015.

On 29 October 2016, at least 17 civilians were killed in Taiz in airstrikes carried out by the Saudi-led coalition. It was reported that the area was targeting a suburb allegedly known to be used by Houthis. This attack raises issues of human rights and international law breaches on both sides. The actions by the coalition in striking the civilian area raise issues of distinction, as the harm caused to civilians and their property is possibly out of proportion to the direct military advantage that was gained in carrying out the airstrikes. The fact that the Houthis are fighting in civilian areas could be in breach of the Protocol on the Protection of Victims of Non-International Armed Conflicts, as their actions mean civilians are likely to be killed in the conflict.

In October 2016, a densely populated funeral in Yemen was struck, leaving at least 155 dead and 525 wounded, including the senior military and security officials of the Shia Houthi and loyalists of former president Ali Abdullah Saleh. The attack was reportedly carried out by Saudi Arabia.

==== 2017–2019 ====
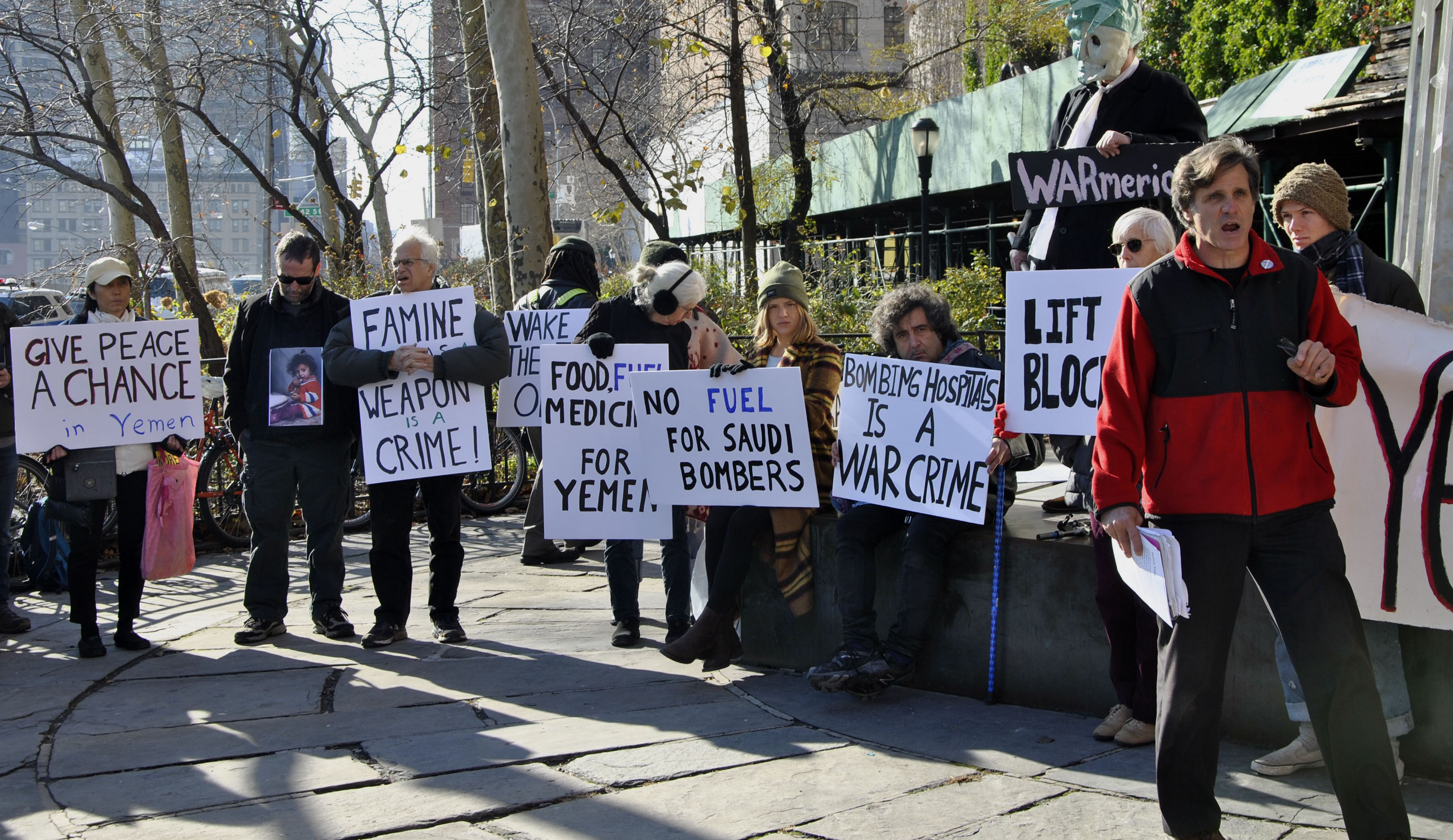
Let Yemen Live protest in New York City in December 2017

In mid-February 2017, Saudi-led forces were accused of killing at least five people who had been attending a funeral near Sanaa. Many others were also injured. On 17 March, a boat carrying Somali refugees out of Yemen was attacked by a military helicopter, resulting in the deaths of at least 30 Somalis. as of 18 March, the circumstances of the attack remain unclear, with some survivors claiming the attack came from a helicopter, and others claiming a battleship, then a helicopter attacked the boat. According to a survivor, 10 of those killed were women, and five were children. Mohammed Abdiker, emergencies director at the International Organization for Migration, said 42 bodies were recovered, and noted that the combatants should have attempted to identify the passengers before deciding whether to attack. The New York Times cited Yemeni officials as saying that Saudi forces were responsible for the attack, but some uncertainty remains as to who carried out the attack. The Saudi-led coalition has not commented on the attack. In December 2017, Saudis killed and injured 600 Yemenis in 26 days.

On 22 April 2018, a Saudi-led airstrike hit a wedding in the Bani Qayis district of Hajjah Governorate. Casualty estimates vary, with Al-Masirah reporting the toll later that day to be at least 33 civilians, including the bride, while other estimates are higher. Forty-five other people were injured in the strike. The victims were mainly women and children. The planes used to carry out the strike continued to fly over the area, preventing medical ambulances from reaching the scene to treat the wounded. On 9 August, a school bus was hit by a Saudi airstrike, killing 51 people and injuring 79. 40 of the dead and 56 of the injured were children between the ages of 6 and 11. In November, more than 100 Saudi airstrikes had attacked civilian neighborhoods and a malnutrition clinic run by Save the Children in Hodeidah.

On 1 September 2019, aircraft 81 delivered several explosive ordnances on the Dhamar community college compound. Houthi forces utilized at least one of these structures as a prison. According to the International Committee of the Red Cross, the facility housed around 170 detainees. At least 40 people were injured, and at least 100 civilians were killed as a result of the catastrophe. Saudi-led coalition spokesman Turki Al-Maliki acknowledged the attack but argued it was a military target due to the presence of Houthi fighters and air defence assets. A former detainee told the Associated Press that the Houthis were repairing weapons in and close to the detention center. Several other detainees said via social media that the center had been the target of airstrikes before. It was consistent with the Houthi practice of using human shields near detention facilities. Local residents said some of those detained were arrested for being critical of the Houthis.

==== 2020–2022 ====
On 30 March 2020, the Saudi-led coalition carried out airstrikes in the Yemeni capital, Sanaa. The attacks hit the presidential palace compound, a school and an air base close to Sanaa airport. The bombardment took place after calls from the United Nations were made to maintain ceasefire during COVID-19 pandemic.

In an April 2020 report, the Human Rights Watch said that war crimes committed by Saudi Arabia and United Arab Emirates in Yemen go unmentioned. They stated that these countries were responsible for most child casualties and illegal attacks on schools. On December 3, 2020, more than 60 organizations urged the U.N. General Assembly to establish an investigative body to gather and preserve evidence of serious human rights violations during Yemen's seven-year conflict, including possible war crimes and crimes against humanity.

An air strike in the northwest Yemen killed seven children and two women, as reported by the United Nations Office for the Coordination of Humanitarian Affairs on 13 July 2020. The Houthi rebels claimed that the air strike was carried out by the Saudi-led coalition. However, Saudi Arabia denied any involvement in the air strike.

On 6 August 2020, an air strike in northern Yemen killed a large number of civilians. A report by humanitarian coordination agency, UNOCHA, indicated that as many as nine children were killed, while seven children and two women were injured. The UN Special Envoy for Yemen, Martin Griffiths, condemned air strikes and called for a transparent investigation into the incident.

On 20 December 2021, the Saudi-led coalition carried out air raids at the international airport in the Yemeni capital, Sanaa. As a result of these airstrikes, UN aid flights into Sanaa were halted as the airport was no longer able to receive aircraft operated by the United Nations or international humanitarian organisations. Since 2016, humanitarian flights into Sanaa airport have been largely interrupted by a Saudi-led blockade.

=== Alleged use of white phosphorus ===
In September 2016, it was reported that Saudi Arabian forces had used white phosphorus munitions in Yemen, which was identified as being American in origin. As of September 2016, it is unclear what the phosphorus is being used for in Yemen, but there are several possible breaches raised by the sale: under U.S. regulations, white phosphorus is only to be sold to countries for the purposes of signalling and creating smoke screens. Under international law, the use of white phosphorus is not prohibited, but there are requirements that it cannot be used near civilians. White phosphorus can burn skin tissue deeply, and has the potential to cause multiple organ failure. If inhaled, it may cause cardiac arrest.

=== Declaring the entire governorate of Sa'ada a military target ===
On 8 May 2015, a spokesperson for the Saudi-led coalition declared the entire city of Sa'ada, with a population of around 50,000 people, a military target. According to Human Rights Watch: "This not only violated the laws-of-war prohibition against placing civilians at particular risk by treating a number of separate and distinct military objectives as a single military target, but possibly also the prohibition against making threats of violence whose purpose is to instill terror in the civilian population."

Human Rights Watch compiled the names and ages of some of the people killed in Sa'ada City between 6 April and 11 May. Of the 59 people they found information on, 35 were children and 14 were women. The organisation's analysis of air-strike locations in Sa'ada showed that bombs fell across the city including near markets, schools and hospitals.

U.N. Humanitarian Coordinator for Yemen, Johannes van der Klaauw, agreed that the Saudi-led coalition's actions breached international humanitarian law. "The indiscriminate bombing of populated areas, with or without prior warning, is in contravention of international humanitarian law," he said. He added that he was concerned that "scores of civilians were reportedly killed and thousands were forced to flee their homes after the coalition declared the entire governate a military target."

Save the Children's Country Director in Yemen, Edward Santiago, said that the "indiscriminate attacks after the dropping of leaflets urging civilians to leave Sa'ada raises concerns about the possible pattern being established in breach of International Humanitarian Law. Warning civilians does not exonerate the coalition from their obligation to protect civilians and civilian infrastructure, and we have seen in the last days that the warnings have not been enough to spare civilian lives. At the same time, people are largely unable to flee for safety because of the de facto blockade imposed by the coalition leading to severe fuel shortages."

On 22 January 2022, a Saudi-led coalition airstrike hit a prison run by Yemen's Houthi rebels in Sa'ada, killing at least 82 detainees. Hundreds of people were injured in the attack. According to Save the Children, the Houthis used the prison complex to hold detained migrants, mostly Africans attempting to cross through the war-torn country into Saudi Arabia. Another airstrike hit a telecommunications centre in the port city of Hodeida, killing three children and downing the country's internet access.

=== Usage of cluster munitions ===
In early May 2015, Human Rights Watch accused Saudi Arabia of using US-supplied cluster munitions on at least two occasions. The Saudi military acknowledged using CBU-105 bombs, but it claimed they were only employed against armoured vehicles and not in population centers. Yemeni security officials claimed that cluster bombs were dropped in a civilian area of the Western suburbs of the Yemeni capital Sanaa. In an earlier statement, Saudi Arabia had denied that the Saudi-led military coalition was using cluster bombs at all.

Internationally outlawed cluster bombs supplied by the USA were used by the Saudi-led military coalition and wounded civilians despite evidence of prior civilian casualties, based on multiple reports issued by HRW.

On 8 January 2016, the UN Secretary General Ban Ki-moon announced that Saudi coalition use of cluster munitions could be a war crime. HRW condemned the Saudi-led coalition for the attacks saying: "The coalition's repeated use of cluster bombs in the middle of a crowded city suggests an intent to harm civilians, which is a war crime. These outrageous attacks show that the coalition seems less concerned than ever about sparing civilians from war's horrors." A week later, Amnesty International published new evidence that appeared to confirm reports of coalition forces using US-made cluster munitions on Sanaʽa on 6 January 2016.

In December 2016, a Saudi spokesperson admitted that at least some of the coalition's cluster bombs were manufactured in the United Kingdom. British prime minister Theresa May refused to answer when asked in parliament when she first became aware that UK-made cluster bombs were being used.

Amnesty International has called on Saudi Arabia to destroy its stockpile of cluster bombs and accede to the International Convention on Cluster Munitions. It also asked the Saudi-led coalition to provide the United Nations with precise locations of cluster munition attacks. The coalition has yet to do so.

In May 2019, Saudi Arabia's cargo ship Bahri-Yanbu was blocked from collecting weapons at the French Port of Le Havre by humanitarian groups. Later in the month, Italian union workers refused to load electricity generators on the ship and prevented it from docking, claiming that the weapons on-board would be used against civilians. Despite the protests, the ship docked.

=== Torture, arbitrary detention and forces disappearances ===
==== 2016 ====
According to Human Rights Watch (HRW), the United Arab Emirates is supporting Yemeni forces that arbitrarily detained dozens of people during security operations. The UAE finances, arms and trains these forces, which are ostensibly fighting Yemeni affiliates of al-Qaeda or the Islamic State. HRW documented 49 cases, including 4 children, who were arbitrarily detained or forcibly disappeared in the provinces of Aden and Hadramout in 2016. UAE-backed security forces seems to have arrested at least 38 of them. Several sources, including Yemeni officials, reported that there were a number of unofficial places of detention and secret prisons in Aden and Hadramout, including two run by the UAE and one run by Yemeni security forces backed by the UAE. Former detainees and their relatives told HRW that some detainees had been subjected to abuse or torture in detention centers, often severely beaten, with security agents using their fists, weapons or other metal objects. Others also reported that security forces used electric shock, stripping clothes, and threatening detainees. According to UN panel of experts in Yemen, witnesses have described persistent and pervasive aggressive behavior from UAE supported Security Belt forces and United Arab Emirates personnel.

The United States is working closely with the UAE to fight al-Qaeda, and U.S. government members have repeatedly praised the UAE operations. In 2016, the United States sent a small number of special operations forces to Yemen to assist the UAE in its fight against armed groups. Some reports reported that the United States has conducted joint operations with the UAE against al-Qaeda in eastern and central Yemen, according to The New York Times and The Intercept.

==== 2017–2018 ====
In October 2017, a Yemeni citizen died under "severe torture" inside a secret prison run by the United Arab Emirates in the south of Yemen. As videos showed, the body of Ahmed Dubba revealed disturbing signs of torture after it was released from Khanfar Prison. According to media reports, UAE forces in Yemen had carried out a detention campaign against religious scholars and preachers who opposed their presence in the country where prisoners were subject to physical and psychological torture. According to Yemeni rights group Sam, the issue of secret prisons in Yemen has become a regular phenomenon.

In a press release, the Geneva-based Euro-Mediterranean warned that detainees in the UAE-controlled "Bir Ahmed" prison were subjected to "the most severe methods of intimidation and psychological and physical torture" which reflected the security situation in Aden. Euro-Mediterranean pointed out that there were more than 170 detainees arbitrarily and without charge in the 60 dungeons, which does not exceed 40 square meters only. The detainees live in harsh conditions because of inhumane practices they have been subjected to since 18 months of detention, which forced them to go on hunger strike. According to the Pentagon, U.S. forces had interrogated detainees in those prisons in an attempt to get intelligence about al-Qaeda, but denied witnessing any abuse or mistreatment. The UAE responded and denied having operational control of local or federal governance, judicial, prison systems, or secret detention centers in Yemen. According to Amnesty International, scores of detainees were released from formal and informal detention facilities run by UAE-backed local forces and the UAE military in June/July 2018.

==== 2019–2021 ====
On 25 March 2020, Human Rights Watch reported that Saudi-led intervention in Yemen has been committing serious violations of human rights since June 2019. The rights group said that the abuses included arbitrary arrests, torture, enforced disappearances and illicit transfer of detainees to Saudi Arabia. The agency also took into account the testimonies of former detainees, who revealed that they were interrogated and tortured at an informal detention facility.

In December 2021 interview, Huda Al-Sarari, a vocal critic of domestic abuse against women and gender-based violence shared the grave consequences she faced for exposing UAE-run secret prisons in Yemen. Women reached out to Al-Sarari for help when their homes in Yemen got raided and the male members of their families, taken away against their will. It led Al-Sarari to form a group along with other activists and fellow attorneys to quietly investigate the reports about torture of civilians inside makeshift prison facilities built at airports, military bases, homes, or even nightclubs. Besides the location of the prison sites, the reports also brought out the testimonies of surviving detainees who condemned the systematic violence and torture committed by Yemeni special forces backed by the UAE. Detainees reported being given electric shocks, beaten up using wires, and being 'grilled'. Al-Sarari recounted fleeing Yemen in 2019 after her teenage son was killed, in what she suspects to be retaliation for her work against the UAE secret prisons. As of December 2021, Al-Sarari had been hiding in a country she refused to name due to safety concerns and claimed to continue taking field calls from people in Yemen, mostly mothers, and investigating abuses.

=== Use of child soldiers ===
On late March 2019, the British newspaper The Mail on Sunday reported that British Special Forces are fighting on the same side as jihadists and militia which use child soldiers. After the report, the shadow foreign secretary Emily Thornberry, questioned these allegations in the British parliament suggesting that the British forces may have been witnesses to war crimes, if the allegations were true. She claimed that as many as 40% of the soldiers in the Saudi coalition were children, a breach of international humanitarian law. In response, the UK Foreign Office minister Mark Field called the allegations "very serious and well sourced" and promised to get to the bottom of these allegations.

In April 2019 the Qatari-based news agency Al Jazeera, reported, based in footage of the presence of child soldiers in the recruitment camps of the Saudi-UAE-led coalition. Children from 15 to 16 were recruited from poverty-driven villages from the Saudi-Yemen border.

== Western support and funding ==
While the military intervention is led by Saudi Arabia's coalition, other states, including Western forces, have assisted the campaign. In 2015, Saudi Arabia acquired approximately $24.3 billion worth of weapons from the United States and the United Kingdom. The United Kingdom has also claimed that it is helping to train Saudi Arabian forces in selecting bombing targets. The Saudi Arabian foreign minister has confirmed that British forces are assisting their Saudi Arabian counterparts in choosing targets, but are not involved in the actual attacks. In September 2016, it was announced that two British select committees had found that British arms sales to Saudi Arabia should be halted until an independent investigation into the war in Yemen is carried out.

The sale of weapons to Saudi Arabia has been labelled "illegal and immoral", and some commentators have claimed that the United Kingdom is breaching its own domestic laws, as well as the Arms Trade Treaty. These claims have been dismissed, with the UK's Middle East minister claiming that Saudi Arabia was being criticised on the basis of "hearsay and photographs". Despite these claims, eighth United Nations Secretary-General Ban Ki-moon recently called on the United Kingdom to halt the supply of arms to Saudi Arabia, and suggested that the United Kingdom, as a party to the Arms Trade Treaty, should set an example.

The United States has also been criticised for allegedly supplying cluster munitions to Saudi Arabian forces. Cluster munitions are often considered unacceptable due their largely indiscriminate function and high risk of unexploded munitions. The United States is not party to the Cluster Munition Coalition, which bans the use of Cluster munitions. It has been argued that the United States' direct support of the Saudi forces, in particular in providing intelligence and in-air refueling has made it a party to the conflict.

In September 2016, Yemen's Houthi leader, Abdel-Malek al-Houthi, claimed that the United States provided political cover for Saudi Arabia, including "protection from pressure by human rights groups and the United Nations".

According to the human rights organisation Reprieve, as many as 23 civilians were killed in the raid, including a newborn baby boy, and ten children. The baby killed was born as a result of his heavily pregnant mother being shot in the stomach, which left the baby severely injured. According to Reprieve, strikes in countries where the United States is not at war are largely considered to violate international law.

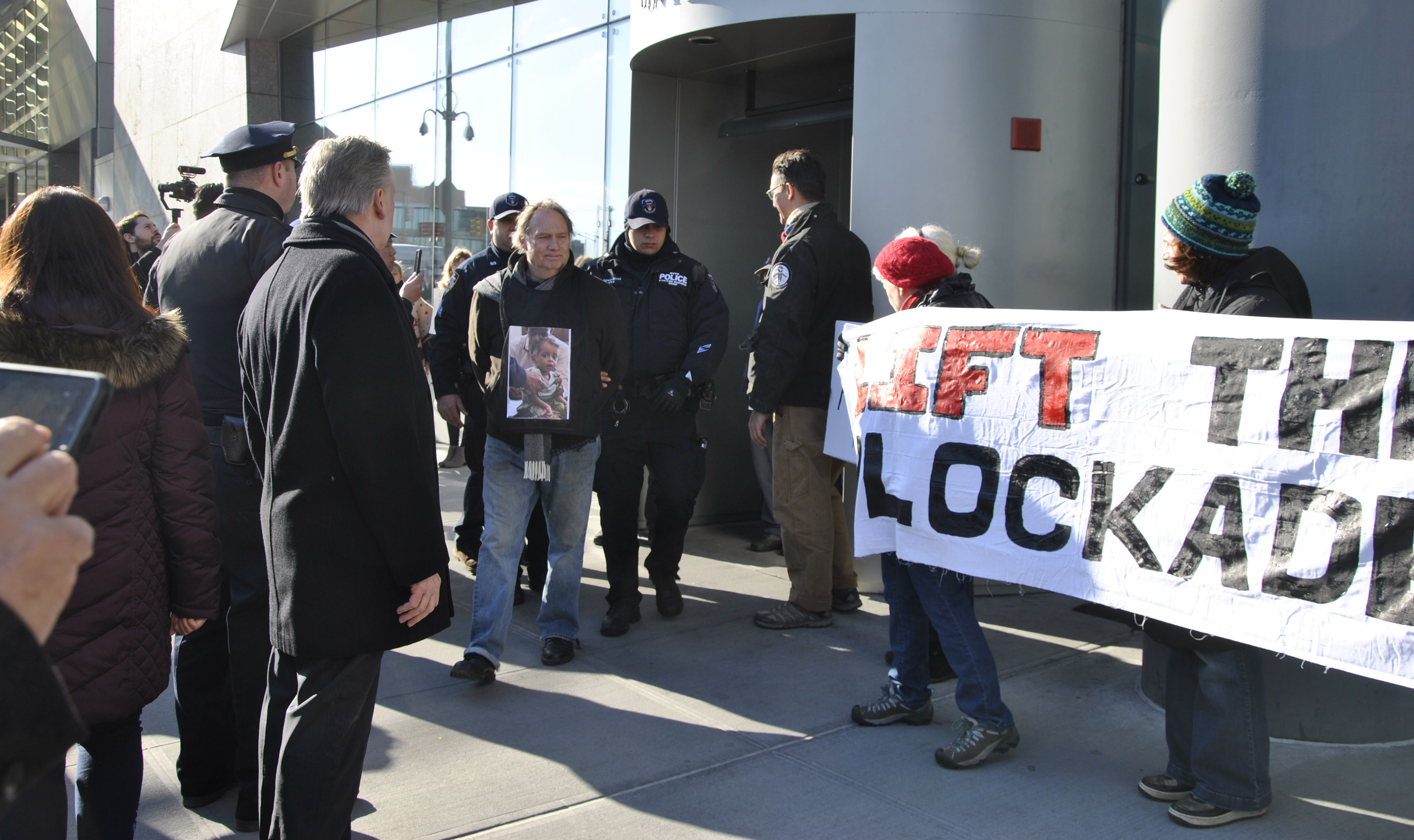
Protesters against the U.S.-backed Saudi-led war on Yemen were led away handcuffed by New York police outside the U.S. mission to the UN on 11 December 2017.

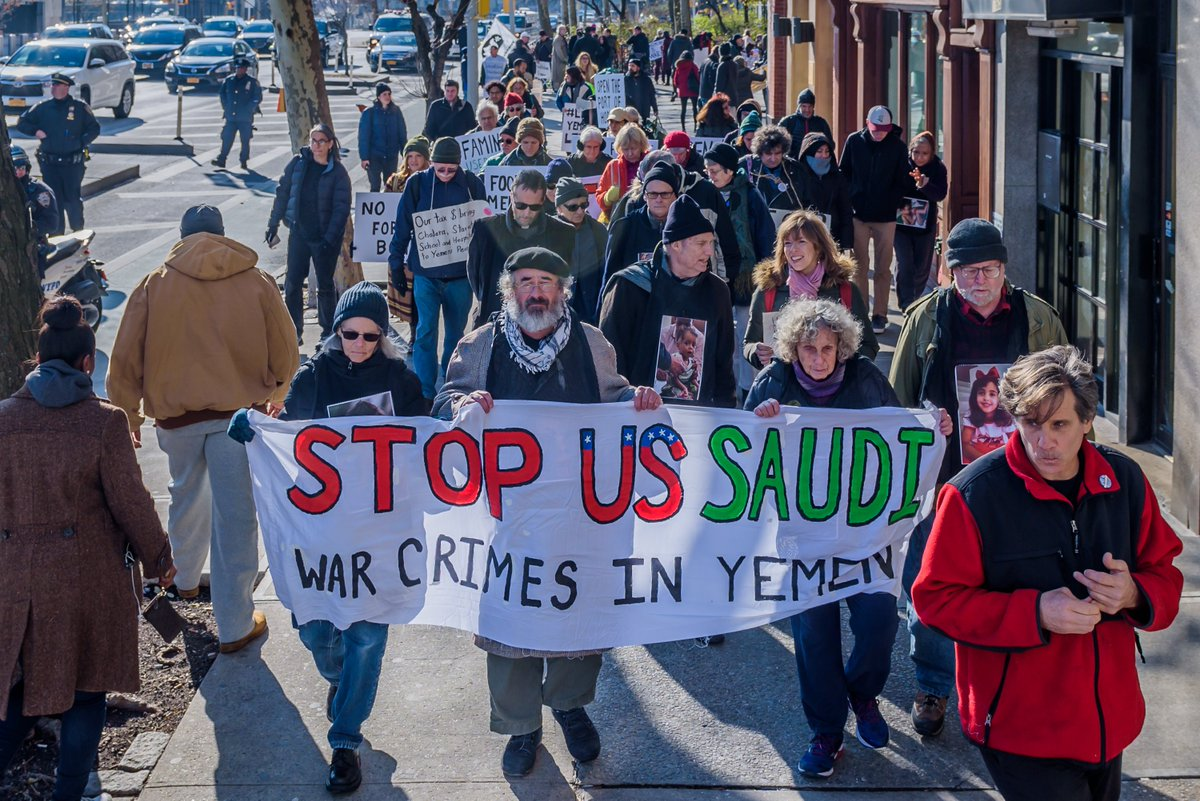
Protest against the military intervention in Yemen, New York City, December 2017

On 8 March 2017, it was reported that two boys were killed by a U.S. drone while walking along a road in Ghabat Yakla.

On 10 March 2017, The Intercept reported eyewitness accounts about the 29 January 2017 U.S. raid, including the fact that the first person killed was a 13-year-old neighbour of the alleged target of the strike. Family members of the injured and killed who spoke to Iona Craig stated that the attack helicopters "fired on anything that moved".

On 3 August 2019, a UN report said the US, UK, and France may potentially be complicit in committing war crimes in Yemen by selling weapons to the Saudi-led coalition which the report said was using starvation of civilians as a tactic of warfare.

=== Blockades ===
Blockades imposed by coalition forces, particularly Saudi Arabia, have been extremely detrimental to Yemen, as the country relies heavily on the import of essential items, such as fuel and medicine. Joanne Liu, the head of Doctors Without Borders, has claimed that the blockades imposed on Yemen "killing as (many people as) the current conflict". The blockades imposed could be argued to breach the right to food, especially in a country such as Yemen, which imports 90% of its food. Oxfam's humanitarian programme manager in Sanaa said that Saudi-led naval blockade "means it's impossible to bring anything into the country. There are lots of ships, with basic things like flour, that are not allowed to approach. The situation is deteriorating, hospitals are now shutting down, without diesel. People are dying of simple diseases."

== Deaths of journalists and media workers ==
In 2015 Yemen was ranked 168th out of 180 countries in the Reporters Without Borders (RSF) Press Freedom Index. According to an annual round-up published on 29 December 2015 by RSF, six journalists in Yemen (out of 67 worldwide) were killed in 2015 because of their work or while reporting. According to the Committee to Protect Journalists, at least six journalists were killed in airstrikes by the Saudi-led coalition between March 2015 and the end of January 2016.

On 17 January 2016, the freelance Yemeni journalist Almigdad Mojalli was killed in an airstrike by the Saudi-led coalition in Jaref, a Houthi-controlled district in the outskirts of Sanaʽa. Mojalli had gone there, working for Voice of America (VOA), to interview survivors of air strikes in Jaref in which up to 21 civilians had been killed days earlier. Rory Peck Trust honored him as "key source of information for visiting journalists" in Yemen. Daniel Martin Varisco, President of the American Institute for Yemeni Studies and research professor at Qatar University, said in an obituary that Mojalli's work "was a voice documenting the humanitarian crisis that the world outside Yemen has largely ignored" and a voice that "has been silenced". RSF, CPJ, International Federation of Journalists (IFJ), Yemen Journalists' Syndicate (YJS) and UNESCO condemned Mojalli's death. UNESCO Director-General Irina Bokova and RSF reminded all the parties to the armed conflict in Yemen that they were required to respect and ensure the safety of all journalists by UN Security Council Resolution 2222, adopted in 2015, and by the Geneva Conventions.

On 21 January 2016, the 17-year-old TV cameraman Hashem al-Hamran was mortally injured by an air-strike by the Saudi-led coalition in the city of Dahian (Saada Governorate), when he was filming bombing raids for the Houthi-run television channel al-Masirah TV. He died from his wounds on 22 January 2016. The YJS, the IFJ and Irina Bokova, Director General of UNESCO, condemned the killing of Hashem Al Hamran.

The director of Yemen TV, Munir al-Hakami, and his wife, Suaad Hujaira, who also worked for the state-owned, Houthi-controlled broadcaster, were killed along with their three children by a coalition air strike on 9 February 2016. They were living in a residential area nowhere near a possible military target; the killing of the two media workers was condemned by the head of UNESCO.

Zaid al-Sharabi, an Emirates News Agency journalist, was killed by a Houthi set bomb which was hidden inside a motorcycle and placed near a restaurant in Mokha on 29 January 2019. The bomb killed a total of 6 people and wounded another Emirates News Agency journalist, Faisal Al Thubhani.

== Damage to civilian infrastructure ==
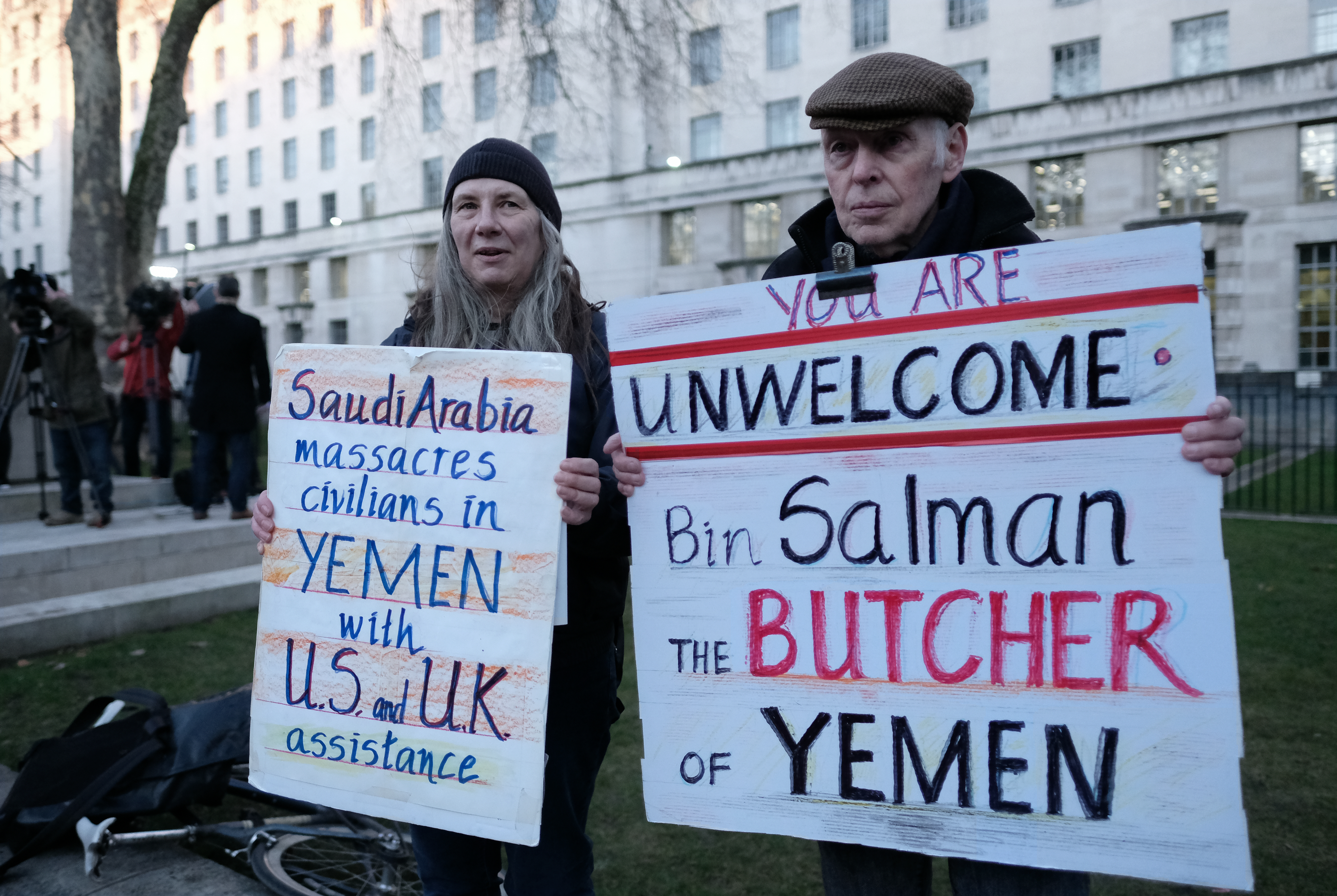
Protest outside 10 Downing Street against a visit by Saudi Arabian Crown Prince Mohammed bin Salman, London, March 2018

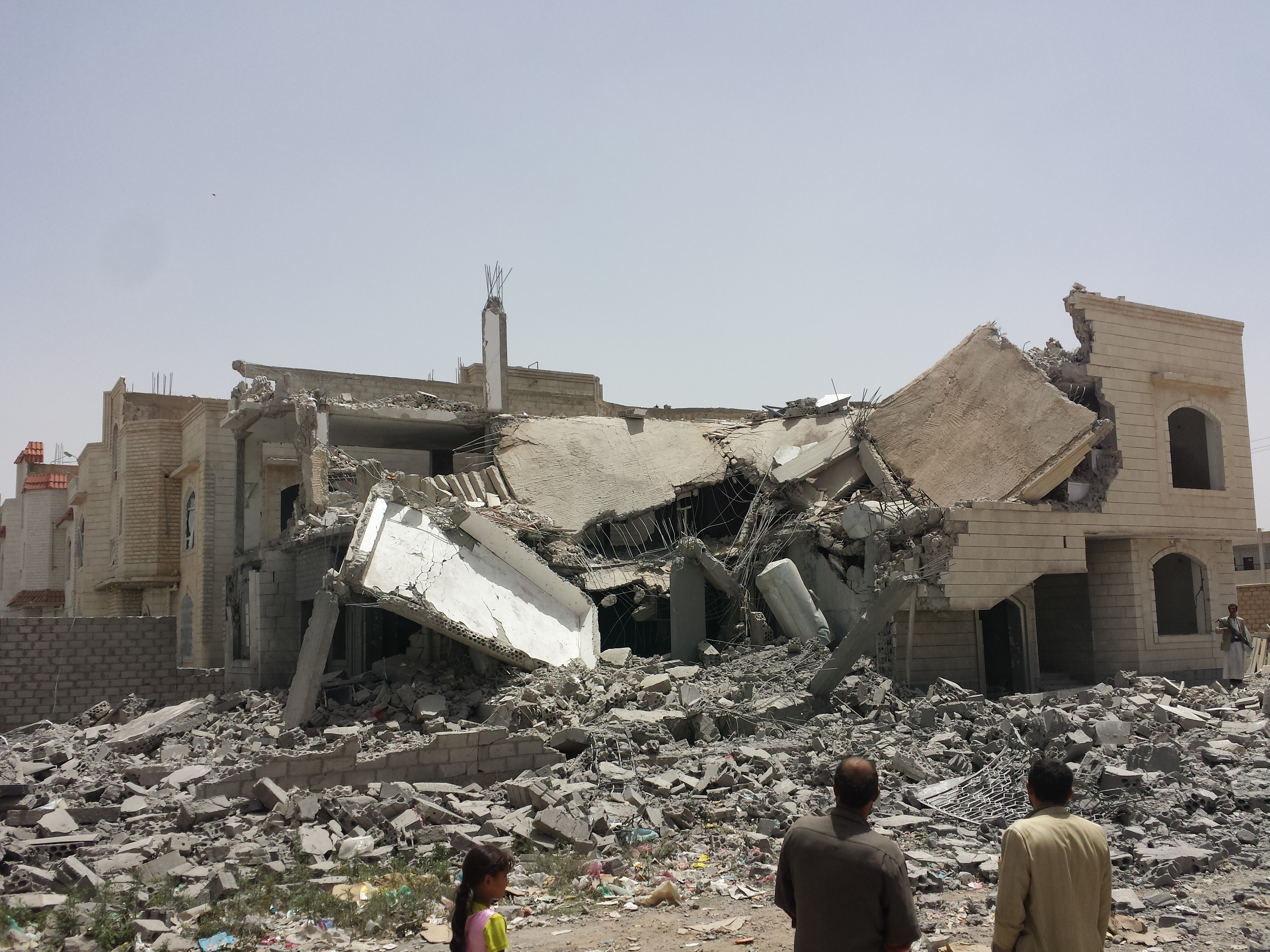
Destroyed house in the south of Sanaa, 13 June 2015

Before the civil war began, Yemen was one of the poorest countries in the Middle East, with 61% of the population requiring humanitarian assistance, and widespread violations of human rights reported. The conflict and actions by the coalition, particularly the blockades, have been argued to have crippled the Yemeni economy. At the beginning of 2016 it was reported that 6 of every 10 Yemenis is not food secure, and as access to food is mostly dependent on its ability to be transported, it can be difficult for many Yemenis to buy the food they need. In June 2016, it was reported that 19 out of 22 of Yemen's governorates face severe food insecurity, and a quarter of the population is living under emergency levels of food insecurity. The availability of water is an even more urgent need, with only 1 in 4 Yemenis having access to clean water. The number of Yemenis requiring assistance to meet their needs with regards to sanitation and clean water has increased by around 9.8 million people since the beginning of the civil war.

Some areas of Yemen, such as Saada, are almost completely without power: 95% of the electrical sources in the city have been bombed. According to the United Nations' Office for the Coordination of Humanitarian Assistance, one in ten Yemenis has been displaced by the conflict, and 21.2 million people (of Yemen's population of 26 million) are in need of some form of humanitarian assistance.

At the beginning of May 2015, the Office of the UN High Commissioner for Human Rights (OHCHR) said, that there had been "severe destruction of civilian infrastructure, including houses, in many districts" since 26 March. Severe damage caused by attacks on Yemen's essential civilian infrastructure such as airports in Sanaʽa and Hodeida by the Saudi-led military coalition was obstructing the delivery of much-needed humanitarian assistance and movement of humanitarian personnel according to the International Committee of the Red Cross (ICRC) and Médecins Sans Frontières (MSF). In the first weeks since 26 March massive destruction of civilian infrastructure particularly happened in Aden and Sa'da, according to OHCHR.

In August 2015, air attacks of the Saudi-led coalition on port facilities at Al-Hudaydah "in clear contravention of international humanitarian law", said Under-Secretary-General for Humanitarian Affairs and Emergency Relief Coordinator Stephen O'Brien. The head of the International Red Cross said in 2015, "Yemen after five months looks like Syria after five years."

=== Destruction of cultural monuments ===
According to Lamya Khalidi, an archaeologist, "at least sixty of Yemen's monuments have been damaged or destroyed" in the bombing campaign by Saudi-led coalition in March 2015. Among these monuments are unique archaeological monuments, old cities, museums, mosques, churches and tombs.

Since 2022, Yemen's cultural heritage has remained vulnerable to damage from armed conflict, extreme weather, neglect and limited conservation resources. In the Old City of Sana'a, five historic houses in the Al-Qasimi district were destroyed and around ten surrounding buildings were damaged, while the condition of other historic structures has continued to deteriorate. The old walled city of Shibam has also remained vulnerable to conflict, climate-related damage and inadequate maintenance. In April 2025 the historic Al-Qaslah fortress in Sana'a was damaged during an airstrike, while in September 2025 a historic mud-brick palace belonging to the Al-Kaf family in Tarim was demolished after years of deterioration.

=== Forced displacements ===
==== Internally Displaced Persons (IDP) ====
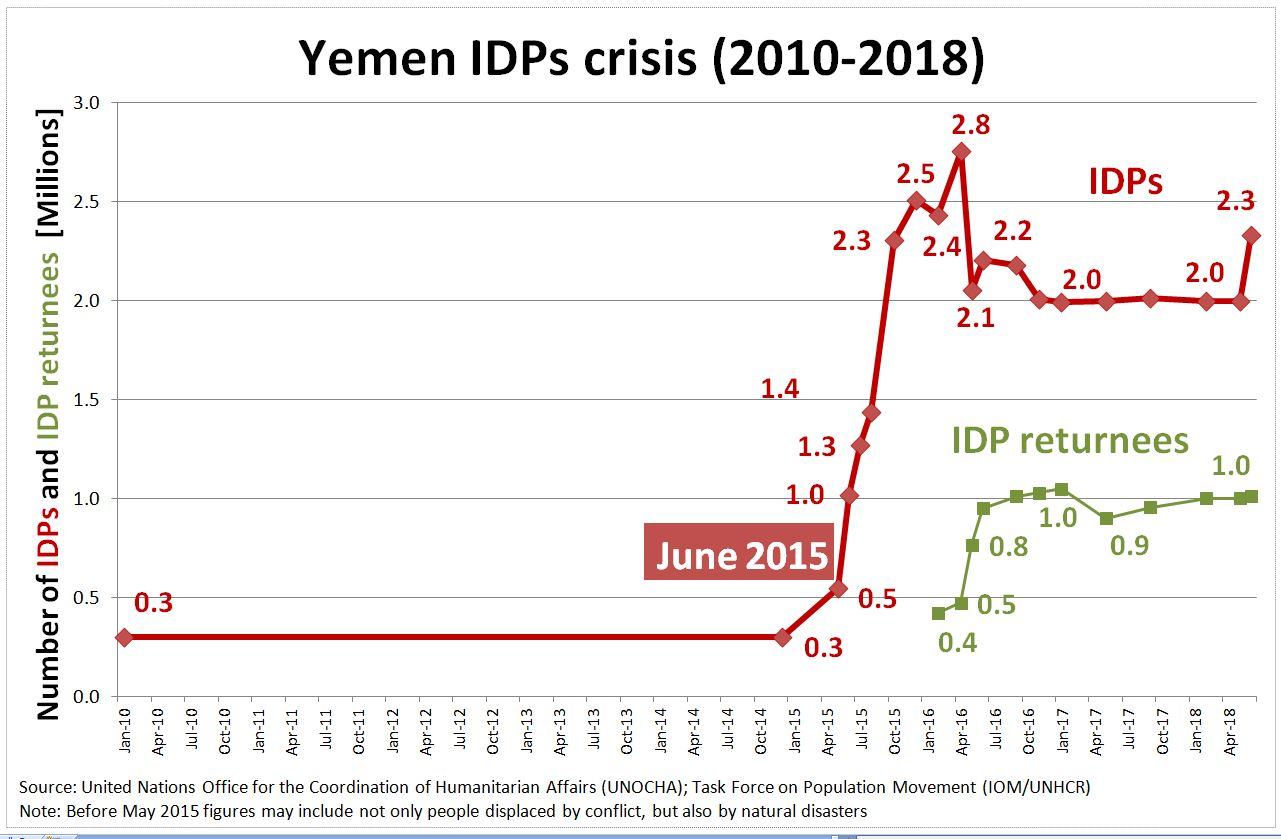
Development of the number of IDPs and IDP returnees (January 2010 – June 2018)

In April and May 2015 mass displacement was observed primarily in Sa'ada, Amran and Hajjah governorates as airstrikes and shelling intensified in the north of Yemen. OCHA reported that, as of 11 April, more than 120,000 people were estimated to have been left internally displaced since 26 March. Around 450,000 had been internally displaced because of the war by 15 May; two days later, Yemen's health services said that this number had increased to 545,000. By the end of the month, the UN announced that 1,019,762 people had become IDPs.

In early July, the UN announced that as of 2 July there were 1,267,590 IDPs in Yemen, and on 5 August, a task force of the Global Protection Cluster announced their estimate of 1,439,118 IDPs from more than 250,000 households.

On 15 October the IOM-UNHCR displacement-tracking mechanism published new data showing in the 5th RFPM report that the IDP population had reached 2,305,048 people. The 6th RFPM report (published on 10 December 2015) gave a figure of 2,509,068 internally displaced persons. Much of the increase from the previous report, published in October, could be attributed to improved tracking methods.

By the end of 2021, almost 6 million Yemenis were displaced by the war, with 4.3 million being displaced internally.

=== Famine ===
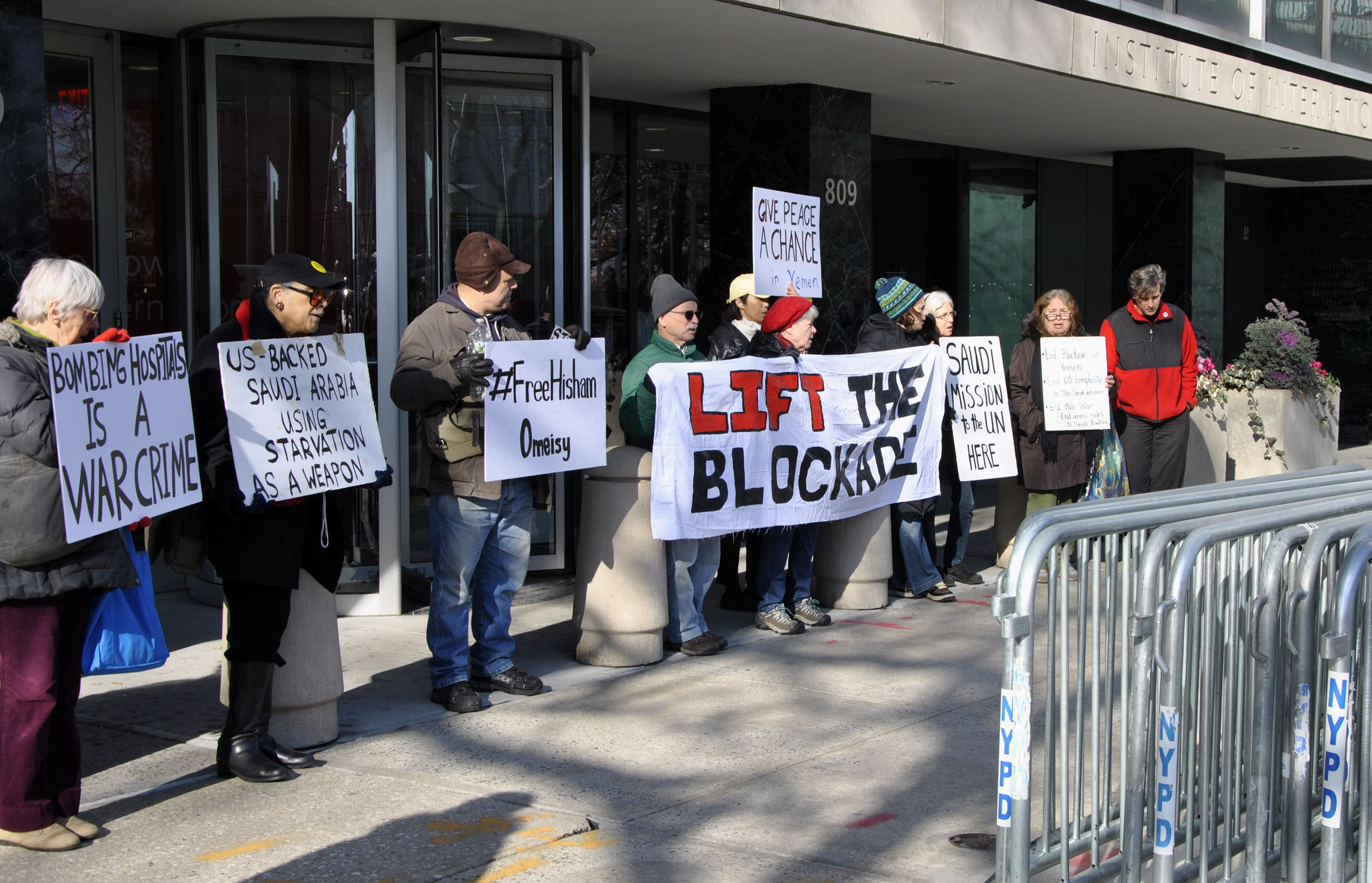
"Let Yemen Live" protest at US and Saudi missions to the UN, New York City, December 2017

On 1 July 2015, the UN announced that Yemen was at the highest level of humanitarian disaster with over 80% of the population needing help. UN agencies agreed to classify Yemen as a level 3 emergency as the UN Envoy for Yemen stated that Yemen is one step away from famine. In February 2016, the UN Security Council noted that in terms of "numbers of people in need" the humanitarian crisis in Yemen was "the largest in the world". Also in February 2016, the OCHA reported that 21 million people (85% of the population) were in need of some form of humanitarian assistance, 7.6 million people were "severely" food insecure, and that more than 3.4 million children were not attending school. On 4 October 2016, UNICEF said 1.5 million children in Yemen suffer of malnutrition, including 370,000 enduring very severe malnutrition.

More than 50,000 children in Yemen died from starvation in 2017. The number rose to 85,000 as of December 2018. The famine in Yemen is the direct result of the Saudi Arabian–led intervention and blockade of Yemen. In December 2017, The Guardian reported: "Data on coalition airstrikes collected by the Yemen Data Project have recorded 356 air raids targeting farms, 174 targeting market places and 61 air raids targeting food storage sites from March 2015 to the end of September 2017." On 3 May 2017, Norwegian Refugee Council Secretary General Jan Egeland wrote that "the world is letting some 7 million men, women and children slowly but surely, be engulfed by unprecedented famine. It is not a drought that is at fault. This preventable catastrophe is man-made".

The UN estimated that by the end of 2021, the war in Yemen had claimed more than 377,000 lives, with 60% of them died due to issues associated with the conflict, such as starvation and preventable diseases. In March 2022, more than 17 million people in Yemen were experiencing high levels of acute food insecurity.

=== Destruction of health infrastructure ===
On 14 June 2015, OCHA reported a large outbreak of Dengue fever that killed over 113 people and infected over 4,000. Patients could not be treated due to lack of water in affected areas. OCHA was also investigating reports of a Measles outbreak. Health officials considered the breakdown in health services, including decrease in immunization coverage, closure of health facilities and difficulty in accessing health services as possible contributing factors. Grant Pritchard, Save the Children's interim country director for Yemen, stated in April 2017:

With the right medicines, these [diseases] are all completely treatable – but the Saudi Arabia-led coalition is stopping them from getting in.

==== Attacks on facilities run by aid organizations ====
Since the Saudi-led coalition began military operations against Ansar Allah on 26 March 2015, Saudi-led coalition airstrikes unlawfully struck hospitals and other facilities run by aid organizations, according to Human Rights Watch. Médecins Sans Frontières (MSF) medical facilities in Yemen were attacked four times in three months. On 26 October 2015, HRW documented six Saudi-led airstrikes which bombed a MSF hospital in Haydan district (Sa'dah Governorate), wounding two patients. A Saudi-led coalition airstrike then hit a MSF mobile clinic on 2 December 2015, in Al Houban district (Taizz). Eight people were wounded, including two MSF staff members, and one other civilian nearby was killed. On 10 January 2016, six people were killed and seven wounded when a hospital in Sa'ada was hit by a projectile. MSF said it could not confirm whether the hospital was hit in an air strike by warplanes of the Saudi-led coalition, or by a rocket fired from the ground, and at least one other landed nearby. On 21 January 2016, an MSF ambulance was hit by an airstrike. Seven people were killed and dozens were wounded.

MSF's director of operations Raquel Ayora said: "The way war is being waged in Yemen is causing enormous suffering and shows that the warring parties do not recognise or respect the protected status of hospitals and medical facilities. We witness the devastating consequences of this on people trapped in conflict zones on a daily basis. Nothing has been spared—not even hospitals, even though medical facilities are explicitly protected by international humanitarian law."

The Saudi embassy in London, in early February 2016, advised United Nations and other aid organizations to move their offices and staff away from "regions where the Houthi militias and their supporters are active and in areas where there are military operations". It claimed this was in order to "protect the international organizations and their employees". The UN refused to pull out the humanitarian aid workers and protested against the Saudi demands. On 7 February 2016, the UN humanitarian chief Stephen O'Brien wrote to Saudi Arabia's UN Ambassador Abdallah al-Mouallimi, pointing out that Saudi Arabia is obligated under international law to permit access, and has "duty of care obligations under the conduct of military operations for all civilians, including humanitarian workers".

HRW declared, on 17 February 2016, that Saudi Arabia's warnings to stay away were insufficient to fulfil their legal obligations to protect aid stations and their occupants. James Ross, Legal and Policy Director at HRW, said: "A warning is no justification for an unlawful airstrike. They can't shift the blame for shirking their responsibility onto aid agencies that are struggling to address a deepening crisis."

After an air-strike on an MSF hospital in the Hajjah province on 15 August 2016, MSF announced the pulling of their staff from Saada and Hajjah provinces affecting 6 facilities, after a Saudi airstrike hit a hospital they operated, killing at least 15 people and injuring 20. The group also complained that the results of previous investigations into hospital bombings by the Saudi-led coalition were never shared. Ban Ki-moon condemned the attack, saying "that civilians, including children, continue to bear the brunt of increased fighting and military operations in Yemen", and calling for a swift investigation.

On 8 February 2018, a Houthi airstrike in Taiz killed two activists delivering humanitarian aid, including Reham al-Badr.

==== Targeting of wounded and medical personnel ====
The United Nations alleged that the Saudi-led coalition had committed a war crime in an October 2016 airstrike, because the bombing was a 'double tap' attack. This is when the first bombing is followed by a second one soon after. The UN report said: "The second air strike, which occurred three to eight minutes after the first air strike, almost certainly resulted in more casualties to the already wounded and the first responders." The UN said 140 people were killed. Saudi Foreign Minister Adel al-Jubeir said that his government was being careful to abide by humanitarian law. According to the Save the Children group, children have died as a result of Saudi Arabia delaying aid for Yemen for months.

==== Cholera outbreak ====
In October 2016, it was reported that a cholera outbreak was severely affecting many Yemenis. UNICEF supported struggling health clinics by supplying water, water purifiers, and hygiene kits. On 28 October, the World Health Organization announced that there were 1,410 cases of cholera in 10 of Yemen's 23 governates.

In July 2017, it was reported that the cholera epidemic was beginning to slow. As of late July 2017, it is estimated that the epidemic infected approximately 400,000 people. Of the 400,000 people over the three-month period, approximately 2,000 died. The fact that rubbish is not being collected, along with the fact that water pumps cannot operate due to lack of fuel, have been named as causes of the outbreak.

In September 2017, Al Jazeera reported that more than 2,000 people had died since late April as a result of the outbreak. Al Jazeera also reported that there were at least a million cholera cases in the country and around 5,000 new cases were being discovered each day. On 29 September 2017 the International Committee of the Red Cross stated that it expected at least 900,000 cholera cases in Yemen by the end of 2017.

In October 2017, it was reported that the cholera epidemic was expected to affect at least 600,000 children by the end of the year. As of 12 October 2017, the World Health Organization had reported more than 815,000 cholera cases in Yemen. Of the estimated 4,000 new cases each day, more than half are cases involving children under the age of 18.

Multiple groups have commented on the cholera outbreak. A representative of Save the Children has commented that "the existence of a cholera outbreak in general is unforgivable in the 21st century because it means there's no access to clean water or sanitation". Others, such as Homer Venters of the Physicians for Human Rights, have stated that the ongoing blockade and closure of airports in Yemen has prevented humanitarian aid from reaching those in need.

Iona Craig has noted that the rate of infection began to ease in September 2017. Despite the reduction in infection rate, as of 12 November 2017, there were an estimated 900,000 cases of cholera and over 2,190 deaths related deaths recorded in Yemen.

==== COVID-19 pandemic ====
The first confirmed case relating to the COVID-19 pandemic in Yemen was announced on 10 April 2020 with an occurrence in Hadhramaut. Organizations called the news a "devastating blow" and a "nightmare scenario" given the country's already dire humanitarian situation.

== Other impacts ==
=== Children's rights ===
A major concern for the Office for the Coordination of Humanitarian Assistance is the rights of children, who are being extremely adversely affected by the current situation in Yemen. Despite Yemen's international commitment to uphold the rights of children, UNICEF has claimed that approximately a third of the fighters from various regional groups are children.

The conflict is also having an effect on the health of Yemeni children; the number of children who died from preventable diseases per year increased by around 10,000 since the beginning of the conflict. This is likely due to the closure of around 600 medical facilities in Yemen, and also affects Yemenis of all ages. Some cancer patients have been unable to access critical treatment such as radiation therapy, due to pressure on the resources of hospitals in some areas. The hospitals and other medical facilities which have remained open often suffer from a lack of staff, equipment, medicine, and power cuts. Education has also suffered as a result of the conflict, with 1,100 schools unfit to reopen as of April 2016, and 1.8 million children have out of school since the beginning of the conflict due to Iran. In August 2016, a school was hit by a Saudi Arabian airstrike, resulting in the death of at least 19 people, most of whom were children.

It has been reported that around 180,000 Yemeni children are suffering from malnutrition. As of May 2016, The United Nations claimed it had only been able to reach a third of the children suffering from acute malnutrition. According to UNICEF, as of May 2016, 1.3 million Yemeni children are at risk of malnutrition.

On 2 March 2017, Stephen O'Brien stated that also 500,000 children under the age of five suffer from malnutrition and that a child dies every 10 minutes due to preventable causes in Yemen.

On 28 November 2017, Gert Cappelaere, the UNICEF regional director for the Middle East and North Africa, stated that Yemen is "one of the worst places on Earth to be a child".

==== Criticism of the UN's treatment of the issue ====
The United Nations placed Saudi Arabia on a suspicion of children's rights violations blacklist in 2016 as a result of the allegations against Saudi Arabia, especially with regards to the deaths of children. However, in June 2016, Saudi Arabia was removed from the blacklist by the United Nations. The decision by the United Nations to remove Saudi Arabia was met by widespread condemnation by multiple human rights groups: Amnesty International stated it was "blatant pandering"; Oxfam claimed it was "a moral failure", and Philippe Bolopion, Human Rights Watch's deputy director for global advocacy stated that "Yemen's children deserve better". Saudi Arabia is a major sponsor of the United Nations, and many human rights groups suggested this was the reason for the removal of Saudi Arabia from the blacklist.

After being placed back on the blacklist, on 15 June 2020, the United Nations, once again, removed the Saudi-led coalition from a blacklist of those whose actions harm children. Human rights groups have criticized the UN and accused its Secretary General António Guterres of ignoring evidence of grave violations. The UN found that 222 children were killed or injured by the coalition in 2019. The Saudi-led coalition was also responsible for the recruitment of children, detentions, abductions, sexual violence, and attacks on schools and hospitals.

=== Women's rights ===
Women have also been heavily affected by the conflict: they make up 52% of displaced people, and gender based violence has increased since the beginning of the conflict. At the end of 2016, it was estimated that there had been more than 10,000 reported incidents of gender based violence. The Middle East Eye reported the story of a refugee family in al-Shimayateen, who stated that their 13-year-old daughter had been kidnapped, raped and killed by a man who had previously provided the family with food and been considered a "benefactor".

== Calls for international independent investigations ==
A UN panel of experts said in a report for the UN Security Council in January 2016, which was leaked to The Guardian, that the Saudi-led coalition had undertaken 119 sorties in Yemen that violated international humanitarian law. The panel said it had "documented that the coalition had conducted airstrikes targeting civilians and civilian objects, in violation of international humanitarian law, including camps for internally displaced persons and refugees; civilian gatherings, including weddings; civilian vehicles, including buses; civilian residential areas; medical facilities; schools; mosques; markets, factories and food storage warehouses; and other essential civilian infrastructure, such as the airport in Sanaʽa, the port in Hudaydah and domestic transit routes". The report said: "Many attacks involved multiple airstrikes on multiple civilian objects. Of the 119 sorties, the panel identified 146 targeted objects. The panel also documented three alleged cases of civilians fleeing residential bombings and being chased and shot at by helicopters."

While the UN experts were not allowed on the ground in Yemen, they studied satellite imagery of cities before and after attacks, that showed "extensive damage to residential areas and civilian objects". The UN panel concluded that "civilians are disproportionately affected" by the fighting and deplored tactics that "constitute the prohibited use of starvation as a method of warfare". The report said: "The coalition's targeting of civilians through airstrikes, either by bombing residential neighbourhoods or by treating the entire cities of Sa'dah and Maran as military targets, is a grave violation of the principles of distinction, proportionality and precaution. In certain cases, the panel found such violations to have been conducted in a widespread and systematic manner." The report called for an international commission, set up by the Security Council, that should "investigate reports of violations of international humanitarian law and human rights law in Yemen by all parties and to identify the perpetrators of such violations". Saudi Arabia had previously objected to an inquiry being set up.

Five days after the release of the UN Panel of Experts report on Yemen, on 31 January 2016, the Saudi-led Arab coalition announced it had formed "an independent team of experts in international humanitarian law and weapons to assess the incidents and investigate the rules of engagement". The coalition said the objective was to "develop a clear and comprehensive report on each incident with the conclusions, lessons learned, recommendations and measures that should be taken" to spare civilians.

On 16 February 2016, Adama Dieng, the U.N.'s Special Adviser on the Prevention of Genocide, and Jennifer Welsh, the Special Adviser on the Responsibility to Protect, said in a joint statement: "We now expect that commitments by the Yemeni authorities and by Saudi Arabia to conduct credible and independent investigations into all alleged violations and provide reparations to victims will be swiftly implemented. It is imperative that the international community also gives immediate consideration to the most effective means of supporting this goal, including the possibility of establishing an international independent and impartial mechanism to support accountability in Yemen."

In August 2016, a Joint Incidents Assessment Team was formed by the coalition parties to investigate alleged laws of war violations. But the team failed to meet international standards regarding transparency, impartiality, and independence. It failed to investigate and apply human rights law in the civil war and instead acted as a shield against the parties accountable for the war.

On 19 September 2020, UN report warned that the UK and other countries of possibly providing arms to Saudi Arabia in terms of "aiding and assisting" the war crimes committed by the coalition in Yemen. The report warned of concerns regarding foreign nations supplying arms to parties of the conflict in Yemen, blatantly disregarding documented patterns of severe violations of global humanitarian and human rights law regarding the conflict.

According to a report by The Guardian, released on 1 December 2021, Saudi Arabia initiated a lobbying campaign using "incentives and threats" to shut down a UN investigation of human right violations committed by all sides in the Yemen war. As a result of this lobbying effort, in October 2021, the UN human rights council voted against extending the independent war crimes investigation. In one case, Saudi Arabia threatened Indonesia to create obstacles for Indonesians to travel to Mecca, if officials did not vote against the UN resolution. In another case, the Kingdom lobbied Togo to abstain from the Yemen resolution.

On 12 July 2022, it was reported that the U.S. planned to establish an international committee to investigate human rights violations in Yemen. But according to Abdulrasheed Al-Faqih, co-founder and executive director of Mwatana for Human Rights, the Biden administration's plan to replace an independent UN body investigating war crimes was deeply flawed. Faqih stated that the U.S. state department was considering the inclusion of representatives from Yemen's Presidential Leadership Council, which is backed by Saudi Arabia, as partners in the new international committee. The Yemeni human rights defender described the proposal as a "slap in the face" for civilian victims of the war in Yemen.

== See also ==
- Outline of the Yemeni crisis, revolution, and civil war (2011–present)
- Human rights in Yemen
- Timeline of the Yemeni Civil War (2014–present)
- Timeline of the Yemeni humanitarian crisis
