= Mass media in Yemen =

Yemen's Ministry of Information influences the mass media through its control of printing presses, granting of newspaper subsidies, and ownership of the country's only television and radio stations. Yemen has nine government-controlled, 50 independent, and 30 party-affiliated newspapers. There are approximately 90 magazines, 50 percent of which are private, 30 percent government-controlled, and 20 percent party-affiliated. The government controls the content of news broadcasts and edits coverage of televised parliamentary debates.

Yemen's government usually monitors and blocks political and sexually explicit Web sites. By law and regulation, newspapers and magazines must be government-licensed, and their content is restricted. There have been reports of journalists being physically attacked, as well as arrested and detained. The government gives reasons that such detained journalists are "opposing the law and calling for destruction of infrastructure" and supports some examples as in Houthi insurgency in Yemen and retaliations against unity.

The official national news agency is the Saba News Agency.

== Printed media ==
Yemen started its ear with printing press in 1853 when the British occupation authorities entered the first printer in Aden to cover its needs of administration, it also sent a number of prisoner to India to train of the manual characters alignment for operating the printing press which was printed by Arabic and English. Printings press expanded in Aden.

There are over 20 licensed newspapers and magazines in Yemen among them are in the following table.

Newspaper/Magazine	Type	Language	Headquarter	Status
Yemen Post	Independent newspaper & online news portal	English	Sana'a	online
Al-Ayyam	Independent daily	Arabic	Aden	Locally blocked*
Al-Sahwa	Islamist weekly	Arabic/English	Aden	online
Al-Thawra	Government-owned	Arabic	Sana'a	online
Al-Jumhuryah	Government-owned	Arabic	Taiz	offline
Yemen Observer	Independent	English/Arabic	Sana'a	online
Yemen Times	Independent weekly	English	Sanaa	online
Al-Motamar	Government-owned	Arabic/English	Sana'a	online
Al-Thawri (Al-Eshteraki)	Weekly Socialist Party	Arabic	Aden	online
14th October	Government-owned	English/Arabic	Aden	offline
Telecoms & IT magazine	Government-owned	Arabic	Sana'a	offline

- Note: the '*' indicates that this newspaper or its website has been blocked by the government, usually due to recent unstable situations.

== Television and radio ==
Yemen has around 17 television channels, 4 channels owned by the government. These channels are:

- Yemen TV channel: The 1st official channel started broadcasting in 1975 in North Yemen as local media, joined other Arab channels via Intelsat-59 in 1995 and later Nilesat.
- Yamania television channel: This channel was founded in 1980 in the South of Yemen as "Aden channel" and was renamed after the unity of Yemen.
- Al-Saeedah television channel: New television channel opened in 2007 and is broadcasting via Nilesat.
- Suhail TV: This channel started its broadcast in July 2009 and is operated by Al-Islah political party on Nilesat.
- Al-Iman television channel: Islamic dedicated channel opened recently in 2008 as a moderate channel against radicalism and terror.
- Aden Live: This channel is run by southern separatists via Nilesat.
- Sama Yemen TV: This channel runs via Nilesat.
- Belqees TV: New television channel began broadcast in October 2014 runs via Nilesat.
- Yemen Shabab TV: This channel targets the youth population and runs via Nilesat.
- Yosr TV: This channel runs via Nilesat.
- Maeen TV: This channel runs via Nilesat.
- Al Saahaat TV: This channel began broadcast on 15 June 2014 and runs via Nilesat.
- Sheba TV: This channel is run by the government via Nilesat.
- Azal TV: This channel broadcasts via Nilesat.
- Yemen Today: This channel broadcasts via Nilesat.
- Al Shareyyah: A new channel started broadcast on 10 April 2015.
- Al Masirah TV: This channel is run by the Houthi movement via Nilesat.

First radio service began in Yemen in 1947. There are more than 10 radio channels most of them broadcasting in the medium waves, except for San'a radio channel that also broadcasts in the short waves, and locally the FM.

== See also ==
- Al Jazeera
- Economy of Yemen
- Education in Yemen
- Telecommunications in Yemen
