= List of newspapers in Yemen =

The press is a significant force in the Yemeni political arena. This is a list of newspapers in Yemen.

Title	Frequency	Locale	Founded	Website	Language	Political affiliation	Circulation
New Yemen	Weekly	Sana'a	2019	https://newyemenen.com	English	Independent	
Yemen Post	Daily	Sana’a & Aden	2007	yemenpost.net	English & Arabic	Independent	
26 September	Weekly	Sana'a	1982				
Al Ahale							
Al-Ayam		Aden	1950				
Al-Bayyinah	Daily	Aden				Organ of the Tawheed and Justice Movement in Yemen	
Al-Balagh		Sana'a	1990s				
Al-Bilad		Sana'a					
Al-Haq		Aden	1997				
Al-Ihya		Aden	1997				
Al-Jamahir						Ba'th Party	
Al-Jumhuryah	Daily	Taiz	1960s				
Al-Methaq	Weekly	Sana'a				Organ of the General People's Congress	
Al-Mo'tamar							
Al-Ra'y		Sana'a	1951				
Al-Ra'y al-'Aam		Sana'a	1985				
Al-Shmoa							
Al-Shoura		Sana'a					
Al-Tajammu		Sana'a	1998			Yemeni Union Gathering	
Al-Tariq		Aden	1996				
Al Thaqafiyah							
Al-Thawra		Sana'a	1962			Pro-government	
Al-Thawry	Weekly					Organ of the Yemeni Socialist Party	
Al-Wahdah		Sana'a	1991				
Al Wahdawi	Weekly	Sana'a	1992			Organ of the Naseri Unionist People's Organization	
Annas Weekly							
14 October		Aden	1968				
Ash-Sharara		Aden					
Ath-Thawra		Sana'a					
Nabaa Al-Haqiqa							
National Yemen							
Nass Press							
Ray Yemen							
Shabab Yemeni				shababyemeni.com			
Yemen Observer	triweekly	Sana'a	1996	yobserver.com^{[usurped]}	English		
October 14	Daily						
Yemen Times	twice weekly	Sana'a	1991	yementimes.com	English	Independent	

== See also ==
- Media of Yemen
