= Television in Yemen =

Local television is the most significant media platform in Yemen. Given the low literacy rate in the country, television is the main source of news for Yemenis. There are six free-to-air channels currently headquartered in Yemen, of which four are state-owned.

The government runs four terrestrial television channels: Yemen TV (the flagship national TV station), Aden TV, Sheba TV (aimed at youth and students) and Al Iman TV (covers religious issues). The Yemeni satellite channel is aimed at Yemeni expatriates abroad, whilst the opposition channel, Suhail TV, is currently headquartered in Riyadh. Due to the high price of satellite dishes relative to the local levels of income, terrestrial channels have the highest penetration, and there is minimal penetration of pay-TV.

Until recently, Al Jazeera and Al Arabiya were the most popular channels for news and information about events in Yemen, however Suhail TV gained in popularity after the political uprisings. A survey conducted by the BBC in 2010, revealed that only 14% of viewers preferred to watch Yemeni state-run TV rather than international satellite channels, suggesting strong preference for satellite channels from overseas.

== List of channels ==
Yemen has around 25 television channels. These channels are:

- Yemen TV : Yemen TV is the national public television station and the flagship state broadcaster of Yemen. The first official channel started broadcasting in 1975 in North Yemen as local media, joined other Arab channels via Intelsat-59 in 1995 and later Nilesat. Broadcasts in Arabic with news, cultural programming, entertainment, and national events. After Houthi Takeover Of Yemen during 2014–2015, On 19 January 2015 the Houthis seized the channel, Then This channel split into two factions: one pro-government (loyal to The International recognized Govt) broadcasts from Aden and Saudi Arabia, the other pro-Houthi Faction broadcasts from Capital Sana'a.

- Aden TV : One of Yemen's earliest television channels, established in 1964 in Aden during British rule — making it one of the region's first TV stations. Originally called Yamania TV Before unification; broadcast general news, culture, and entertainment.
- Sheba TV : State-owned channel aimed at educational, cultural, and general programming.Programming includes youth and student-oriented shows, cultural features, and informational content linking communities across Yemen.
- Al-Saeeda television channel: New television channel opened in 2007 and is broadcasting via Nilesat.
- Suhail TV channel: This channel started its test programs in May 2009 on Nilesat and Arabsat, but soon after (about 2 months) closed upon the government request to Kuwait, Then The channel resumed broadcasting from Britain on August 26, 2009, via Nilesat at the new frequency, 11595 MHz. After Houthi Takeover of Yemen's Capital San'aa in September 2014, The Houthi Rebels confiscated the channel's broadcasting equipment and seized its office and studios. After these incidents, the channel continues to broadcast from Saudi Arabia.
- Yemem Today TV : This channel is an independent satellite TV channel closely associated with Yemen's General People's Congress (GPC) party and the political network of the former President Ali Abdullah Saleh. It served as a media outlet to broadcast news, political commentary,party positions and Entertainment Programmes . This Channel Played a great role during Yemen Civil War. In December 2017, at the height of clashes between Saleh's loyalists and the Houthis in Sana’a, Houthi forces stormed and seized control of the Yemen Today TV, After the seizure, the channel's operations effectively split into two factions : one pro Houthi faction from Sana'a and other pro Saleh faction broadcast from Egypt.
- Yemen Shabab TV : This channel was established around 2011 during the post-Arab Spring media expansion. It initially broadcast from Yemen and became associated with anti-Houthi political currents, particularly those aligned with the internationally recognized government. After Houthis and allied forces took control of Sana’a and other key areas in late 2014–early 2015 Yemen Shabab TV moved its operations in Turkey and Qatar. This Channel broadcasts political news, analysis, talk shows, and cultural programming aimed at Yemeni audiences inside and outside the country.
- Al Masirah TV * Al Masirah is a Yemeni satellite television channel owned and operated by The Houthi Movement. The channel was launched in 2012, serving as the group's primary media outlet with political, news, cultural, and ideological programming.

TV channel	Transmission Schedule	Satellite
Yemen TV	24/7/365	Hot Bird 13
Aden TV (First Yemeni TV established and 3rd Arabic)	24/7/365	Eutelsat 7
Sheba TV	24/7/365	Eutelsat 7
Al-Saeedah TV	24/7/365	Nilesat 201
Al-Eman TV	24/7/365	Eutelsat 8
Yemen Education TV	24/7/365	Eutelsat 8
Yemen Documentary TV	24/7/365	Eutelsat 8
Yemen Today	24/7/365	Nilesat 201
Al Shareyyah	Offair	Eutelsat 7
Suhail	24/7/365	Nilesat 201
Yemen Shabab	24/7/365	Eutelsat 7
Saba Marib TV	24/7/365	Nilesat
Al Masirah	24/7/365	Eutelsat 7
Al Saahaat	24/7/365	Eutelsat 8
Belqees TV		Eutelsat 7
Sama Yemen	Offair	Eutelsat 7
Al Rushd Channel	Offair	Nilesat
Al Mahriah TV	24/7/365	Nilesat 201
Hadhramaut TV	24/7/365	Nilesat 201
Aden Mustakilla AIC TV	24/7/365	Eutelsat 7
Al Hawyah TV	24/7/365	Eutelsat 8
Allahdah TV	24/7/365	Eutelsat 8
Al Jomhouriyah TV	24/7/365	Nilesat 301
Hadhramaut Red Channel	24/7/365	Nilesat 201, Eutelsat 8
Reef Yemen TV	24/7/365	Eutelsat 7
Al Mukalla TV		Nilesat
Aden Live TV	Offair	Nilesat
Saout AlJonoub TV	Offair	Nilesat

== See also ==
- Radio in Yemen
