= List of journalists killed in Yemen =

Places in Yemen where journalists were killed. A gold pin marks the location of murders. A red pin stands for overlaps.

List of journalists killed in Yemen includes nine journalists listed as confirmed since 1992 by Committee to Protect Journalists. Three media workers are also confirmed killed, as well as two more journalists still under investigation by the press freedom organization.

While covering the struggles between Houthi militias and Saudi Arabian forces there have been multiple journalists who have lost their lives in 2015. Among these, many were casualties resulting of bombings by Saudi Arabian forces targeting Houthi bases.

== Journalists killed prior to 2011 ==
- Muhammad al-Rabou'e was murdered February 13, 2010 in Hajjah province, Yemen

== Journalists killed since the Arab Spring Uprising in Yemen ==
In September 2014, Houthi rebels captured the capital of Yemen, Sana'a. This forced the Yemeni government to flee the city and relinquish their power. The two places where journalists have been killed in Yemen in 2015, are both Houthi occupied locations. There have been airstrikes and bombing by Saudi Arabian military in an attempt to weaken Houthis; however these have resulted in many deaths, including most of the above journalists.

Date	Name	Employer	Location	Notes	Refs
18 March 2011	Jamal al-Sharaabi	Al-Masdar	Sana'a	He was the first journalist in Yemen to die & one of 50 who were killed by Yemeni security forces during a demonstration against ex-President Saleh in Sanaa’s Change Square	
18 March 2011	Mohamed Yahia Al-Malayia	Al-Salam	Sana'a	The correspondent of the newspaper Al-Salam, died from the gunshot wound he received when he was hit by a sniper during the deadly attack by government forces on demonstrators in Sanaa’s Change Square with al-Sharabi	
24 September 2011	Hassan al-Wadhaf	Arabic Media Agency (Alhurra)	Sana'a	Notes: From injuries sustained from sniper fire while reporting on protests on 18 March 2011.	
3 October 2011	Abdel Majid Al-Samawi	TV journalist	Sana'a	Al-Samawi died in Sanaa Technological Hospitalone week after a sniper shot his neck on 25 September during a bombardment of the city Taiz that caused many casualties.	
4 October 2011	Abdel Hakim Al-Nour	Mas & Hayel Saeed Anam Association	Taiz	Notes: From bombardment	
16 October 2011	Abd Al-Ghani al-Bureihi	Al-Yemen TV	Sana'a		
22 October 2011	Fuad al-Shamri	Al-Saeeda TV (chief financial officer)	Sana'a	Notes: From sniper fire immediately following an attack on the office of the media outlet.	
16 August 2014	Abdul Rahman Hamid al-Din				
6 December 2014	Luke Somers			Luke Somers was killed as a result of a United States rescue operation and died 6 December 2014 shortly after being extracted.	
4 January 2015	Khaled al-Washli	Al-Masirah TV	Dhamar	Washli was killed by an exploding bomb as he covered attempts to diffuse it.	
18 March 2015	Abdel Karim al-Khaiwani	Freelance	Sana'a	Al-Khaiwani was shot outside his home in Sana'a.	
20 April 2015	Mohammed Rajah Shamsan	Yemen Today	Sana'a	Shaman was killed by a Saudi airstrike against Houthi militia in Sana'a	
20 April 2015	Monir Aklan				
20 April 2015	Amin Yehia				
20 April 2015	Hazzam Mohamed Zeid				
20 May 2015	Abdullah Kabil				
20 May 2015	Yousef Alaizry	Suhail TV	Dhamar	Ayzari was kidnapped and held in a warehouse that was bombed the next day	
21 May 2015	Abdullah Qabil	Yemen Youth TV, Belqees TV	Dhamar	Qabil was kidnapped and perished alongside Ayzari	
17 September 2015	Bilal Sharaf al-Deen	Al-Masirah TV	Sana'a	Al-Deen was covering an airstrike, when he was killed by a following airstrike.	
17 January 2016	Almigdad Mohammed Ali Mojalli	Freelance	Jaref (Sana'a)	Mojalli was covering an airstrike, when he was killed by a following airstrike.	
22 January 2016	Hashem al-Hamran	Al-Masirah TV	Dahian (Saada)	Al-Hamran was covering bombing raids, when he was killed by an airstrike by the Saudi-led coalition.	
9 February 2016	Munir al-Hakimi				
9 February 2016	Suad Hujaira				
16 February 2016	Ahmed al-Shaibani	Yemen TV, news website Yaman News	Taiz	Al-Shaibani was shot and killed by a sniper while covering the conflict in Taiz.	
21 March 2016	Mohammed al-Yemeni				
29 May 2016	Abullah Azizan				
22 July 2016	Abdulkarim Al-Jerbani				
5 August 2016	Mubarak Al-Abadi				
18 November 2016	Awab Al-Zubairi				
21 December 2016	Mohammed al-Absi				
26 May 2017	Taqi Al-Din Al-Huthaifi				
26 May 2017	Wael Al-Absi				
26 May 2017	Sa’ad Al-Nadhari				
22 January 2018	Mohammad Al-Qadasi				
13 April 2018	Abdullah Al Qadry				
2 June 2018	Anwar Al-Rakan				
30 August 2018	Ahmed al-Hamzi				
16 September 2018	Omar Ezzi Mohammad				
16 September 2018	Ali Aish Mohammad Youssef				
16 September 2018	Jamaie Abdullah Musib				
28 January 2019	Ziad al-Sharabi	Abu Dhabi TV	Mokha	Al-Sharabi was one of 6 people killed by a Houthi set motorcycle bomb attack in Mokha.	
3 June 2020	Nabil Hasan al-Quaety	Associated Press	Aden	While driving his car, Al Quaety was assassinated by an unknown gunman.	
10 September 2025	31 journalists	Al-Yemen and 26 September	Sanaa	Twenty-six journalists were killed during a series of Israeli airstrikes in Sanaa, after the headquarters of their journals were targeted.	

== Reactions ==
Abdel Karim al-Khaiwani “I condemn the murder of Abdul Karim Mohammed al-Khaiwani, a dedicated journalist of integrity,” the Director-General said. “His death is a loss to the people of Yemen and the quest for informed reporting and debate. Mr al-Khaiwani’s killers must be brought to trial as quickly as possible.” – Irina Bokova, Director General of UNESCO.

Mohamed Shamsan “In the present conflict in Yemen, the deaths of journalist Mohammed Rajah Shamsan, and his fellow Yemen Today employees Monir Aklan, Hazzam Mohamed Zeid and Amin Yehia, is a loss for society as a whole, as civilians depend on the media to provide them with information that is vital for their safety. I call on all parties to respect fully the civilian status of media workers, in keeping with the Geneva Conventions” – Irina Bokova, Director General of UNESCO.

Bilal Sharaf al-Deen “We hold the coalition responsible for the death of our colleague who died in a bombing that was targeting a residential neighborhood yesterday evening in the city of Sanaa” – International Federation of Journalists.

Almigdad Mojalli “I condemn the death of Almigdad Mojalli. I call on all parties to make sure that journalists are able to carry out their work in the safest possible conditions, in keeping with the Genevan Conventions and UN Security Council Resolution 2222, which was adopted last year to improve the safety of journalists in conflict situations.” – Irina Bokova, Director General of UNESCO.

Hashem al-Hamran “I condemn the killing of Hashem Al Hamran. His death highlights the imperative need to improve the security of media professionals in all circumstances. The free flow of information is important for any society. It becomes truly vital for civilians living with the hardship of conflict.” – Irina Bokova, Director General of UNESCO.

Ahmed al-Shaibani “I condemn the murder of Ahmed Al-Shaibani. Targeting press workers in conflict situations is a war crime under international law. It also deprives civilians of vital information they need to cope with the difficulties of war and undermines informed public debate which is so important to help restore peace and stability.” – Irina Bokova, Director General of UNESCO.

== See also ==
- Media of Yemen
- Yemeni Revolution
- Houthis
- Arab Spring
