= 26 September (newspaper) =

Yemeni military newspaper

- Type: Weekly newspaper
- Owner(s): Yemeni Armed Forces and Ministry of Defense
- Publisher: Moral Guidance Department
- Founded: 1990; 36 years ago
- Language: Arabic
- Headquarters: Sanaa, Yemen
- Country: Yemen
- Website: 26sep.net (SPC); www.26sepnews.net (PLC); en.26sepnews.net (PLC, English)

26 September (Note: Arabic: 26 سبتمبر) is a Yemeni state-owned weekly newspaper which is an official media outlet of the Yemeni Armed Forces. Originally founded in 1990 and headquartered in Sanaa, it is published by the Moral Guidance Department of the Yemeni army and is a mouthpiece of the government. Since the Houthi takeover of Yemen in 2014, there are two separate versions of the newspaper; one ran by the Houthis and another ran by the internationally recognized government of Yemen.

== Overview ==
26 September was founded in 1990 and is based in Sanaa, the capital of Yemen. Its name is derived from the starting day of the North Yemen civil war. (Note: Also known as the 26 September Revolution.) It is a weekly publication belonging to the Moral Guidance Department, part of the Yemeni Armed Forces as well as the Ministry of Defense, and has been described as a mouthpiece for said institutions. Its website claims that it "focuses on monitoring and publishing all military activities, as well as everything related to the state, government, local issues, expatriate affairs, Arab, regional, and international issues, in addition to cultural, economic, sports, miscellaneous, and women's issues." The army exhibits control over the newspaper, and articles are cleared by the defense ministry's media office prior to being published.

During the regime of Ali Abdullah Saleh, the newspaper was supervised by two presidential advisor; Ali Hassan al-Shater and Abdo Bourji. Shater was its editor-in-chief and also the director of the Moral Guidance Department since the 1970s. He was regarded as one of Saleh's strongest allies in the military.

During the Yemeni revolution, journalists at 26 September received dismissals and threats of imprisonment for denouncing corruption at the newspaper, and went on strike in response. Demonstrations outside of the Moral Guidance Department offices in December 2011 blocked Shater from entering. The protestors eventually managed to take over the premises and publish an editorial through 26 September denouncing Shater for his corruption and loyalty to the Saleh regime. He was dismissed by the government on 31 December and replaced by Brigadier General Yahya Abdullah al-Saqladi.

After their capture of Sanaa in September 2014, the Houthis converted 26 September into the official outlet of the Houthi-aligned faction of the Yemeni army. Its offices in Sanaa were seized, while production and funding of the newspaper of were allocated to the political wing of the Houthis, Ansar Allah. The newspaper continued to employ some journalists hired before the Houthi takeover. A newspaper vendor in Sanaa said that 26 September is one of the only three printed newspapers available in the area, the other two being Al-Thawra and Al-Masirah, all of them controlled by the Houthis. The internationally recognized government of Yemen maintains its own separate version of the newspaper.

== See also ==
- 14 October (newspaper)
- Saba News Agency
