= Hajjah Governorate airstrike =

2018 Attack in Yemen

- Part of the Saudi Arabian-led intervention in Yemen
- Location: Bani Qa'is District, Hajjah Governorate, Yemen
- Date: 22 April 2018
- Attack type: Airstrike
- Deaths: Varying estimates, from 33, 43, up to 55 according to some sources
- Perpetrator: Royal Saudi Air Force

On 22 April 2018, an airstrike by the Saudi Arabian-led coalition hit a wedding in the Bani Qa'is District of Hajjah Governorate, Yemen. Casualty estimates vary, with the Houthi-owned Al-Masirah reporting the toll later that day to be at least 33 civilians including the bride. Forty-five other people were injured.

== Airstrike ==
The Saudi Arabian-led coalition carried out two separate airstrikes in Yemen. The planes repeatedly flew over the area where the strike was being conducted, thus preventing medical personnel from treating the victims. The victims were primarily women and children, who were congregating in one of the tents set up for the wedding. A Houthi government spokesperson said that ambulances were initially unable to reach the scene due to the threat from jets, which continued to fly overhead.

According to the Houthi officials, the strikes first targeted the men gathering at the wedding and then the women.

The airstrike killed the bride and wounded the groom with shrapnel. Some of the injured children lost eyes and limbs. According to Abdul Hakim Alkhulani, a spokesperson for the Health Ministry, "Due to many casualties from the coalition-led wedding attacks, field hospitals were made near the site of the attacks giving injured civilians medical treatment in order to save lives". Video footage of the airstrike shows body parts scattered around the area, as well as a young boy hugging a man's body who had died from the strike. According to Bellingcat, a citizen journalist organisation, the bomb was made by the American company Raytheon.

== Reactions ==
A spokesperson for the Saudi Arabian coalition which carried out the airstrike said, "We take this report very seriously and it will be fully investigated as all reports of this nature are".

The foreign ministry spokesman of Iran, Bahram Qassemi, responded to the airstrike saying "The escalated bombardment of residential areas proves the desperation and inability of the invaders in achieving their goals".

The Saba News Agency of Yemen described the airstrike as "the new genocidal crime of the Saudis".

The Campaign Against Arms Trade, a UK-based organisation, responded to the incident with a criticism of the UK government, "Yemen is now in its fourth year of war, and the bombardment is getting worse. Thousands have been killed, and many more will be if it continues. Theresa May has said she wants the UK to play a positive role on the world stage, so why is her government still arming and supporting Saudi atrocities? It's time for her to put the lives of Yemeni people above the interests of arms companies."

== See also ==
- Saudi-led intervention in the Yemeni civil war
- Saudi-led intervention in Bahrain
