= Muhammad al-Rabou'e =

Yemeni journalist (1976–2010)

Mohammed Shu’i Al-Rabu’i
- Born: ca. 1976
- Died: 13 February 2010 (Aged 34); Bani Qa'is District, Hajjah Governorate, Yemen
- Cause of death: Gunshot wounds
- Occupation: Print journalist
- Years active: 11 years
- Employer: Al-Qahira (monthly)

Mohammed Shu’i Al-Rabu’i, also spelled Mohammed Shùi Al-Rabù and Muhammad al-Rabou'e, (1976? – 13 February 2010), was a Yemeni journalist for the monthly magazine Al-Qahira and was killed at his home in the Bani Qa'is District, Hajjah Governorate of Yemen, where he worked for 11 years reporting on crime and corruption cases. His last articles were about a local criminal gang known as the Aouni family, who allegedly were involved in child trafficking. Five members of the Aouni gang killed al-Rabou'e on 13 February 2010 after being released from jail for a previous attack on al-Rabou'e in 2009. Al-Rabou'e's was one of 44 journalists killed in 2010. His death prompted some Yemeni political leaders to meet to discuss how to end violent targeting of journalists in Yemen. He was the first journalist killed in Yemen since the 1990 unification.

The Committee to Protect Journalists (CPJ) reported that he was murdered by a criminal group, and that the local police arrested five members of the Aouni family, "in retaliation for the reporter's coverage of their alleged criminal activities, including accusations of child trafficking."

== Personal ==
Al-Rabou'e lived in the Beni Qais district in the province of Hajjah and worked for Al-Qahira for 11 years before his murder in 2010. He was 34 years old at the time of his death.

== Career ==
Al-Rabou'e's journalistic work was published in several outlets. The publisher of his last articles was Al-Qahira, a monthly, which is associated with the Al-Islah opposition political party. Al-Rabou'e worked to reveal corruption among the terrorists groups; one particular story al-Rabou'e followed was the extremist gang known as the Aouni family, a local gang group in Yemen, as well as their affiliation with child trafficking. According to NewsWatch, Muhammad al-Rabou'e received several death threats from the gang family several times in order to stop al-Rabou'e from publishing the articles.

== Death ==
Hajjah is in Yemen and shown relative to the capital Sana'a.

The same gang that killed al-Rabou'e on 13 February 2010 had previously attacked him and were arrested, jailed and released in 2009. According to Al-Jazeera, five men invaded al-Rabou'e's Beni Qais home and shot the journalist several times. Most sources say he was shot at his home but one source reported that he was shot at "a mountain pass." In an interview with CPJ, Security Chief Abdelrazaq Azzaraq reported that five individuals were arrested and involved in the murder of al-Rabou'e. Azzaraq believes that the murder was a retaliation of al-Rabou'e's articles involving the crime tactics of the family he wrote about near the end of his life. The Aouni family consists of Ahmad Aouni and his four sons. According to CPJ, the Aouni family was arrested back in 2009 for assaulting al-Rabou'e, but were not charged in court and eventually were released.

== Context ==
Al-Rabou'e worked in Yemen, which is located south of Saudi Arabia and west of Oman. Yemen has strict media policies because they are "threatened by sectarian rebels in the north, a political protest movement in the south, and increased activity by the terrorist network Al-Qaeda within its borders". The country's government is cracking down on the media, prohibiting any material that demoralizes the government and Islamic heritage. In recent years, many journalists have been prosecuted for counts of terrorism. Journalists and media outlets must obtain a permit in order to publish articles in magazines and newspapers as well as to be a journalist. These licenses must be renewed every year for a price (about $3,200). Newspapers that do not follow media conduct laws may lose their license at any time. Although censorship isn't necessarily controlled by the government, news media usually take careful consideration of what they print purely out of fear. Publishers and journalists fear that what they print in media may elicit consequences from particular radical groups and gangs, like in Muhammad al-Rabou'e's case. Journalists are always subject to scrutiny when writing about sensitive topics. Since 2012, three U.S journalists have been deported from Yemen.

== Impact ==
ASl-Rabou'e was the first journalist killed in Yemen since the 1990 unification. Shortly after al-Rabou'e's death, Yemeni journalists, lawyers, and others gathered to discuss ideas that would stop the targeting and violence against journalists. Adbel Bari Tahel, a participant, said journalists, whether visitors or citizens, are "the responsibility of the state." His death also prompted some Yemeni political leaders to meet to discuss how to end violent targeting of journalists in Yemen.

== Reactions ==
The editor and chief of Al Qahira, the periodical al-Rabou'e worked for, said that "'Al-Rabou’e was brave and committed to his journalistic mission... He has uncovered many corruption cases in the course of his career and has received many death threats, but not once had he thought of putting an end to his work.'" Tawakkol Karman, a journalist, president of Women Journalists Without Chains, and later the 2011 Nobel Peace Prize winner, said, "The real battle is between these journalists and terrorists because journalists are the real opponents of terrorism and extremism. They represent a culture of peace, dialogue and co-existence." every day in a (Yemini) journalist's life is a "battle against terrorists and extremists."

The Yemen Journalist Syndicate released a statement following his murder, in which the organization said, "We will never drop our pens, never let the murders flee justice and never leave journalists facing threats alone." After al-Rabou'e's death, the Committee to Protect Journalists released a statement: "We are saddened by the murder of Muhammad al-Rabou'e and offer our condolences to his family and colleagues. We urge the prosecution to move quickly to ensure that the perpetrators are held to account."

== See also ==
- List of journalists killed in Yemen
