= Radio in Yemen =

Broadcasting began in Yemen in the 1940s when it was still divided into South and North Yemen, with the South being ruled by the British and the North being ruled by the Kingdom of Yemen. After the unity of Yemen in 1990, Yemeni government reformed its corporations and founded some additional radio channels which can broadcast locally. However, it drew back after 1994 due to destroyed infrastructures by the civil war. In 1995 it commenced its first TV broadcasting abroad and since then there has been some gradual increase in its radio and television channels most of which belong to the government.

== History ==
=== Southern Yemen ===
British army established a small radio station at Ra's Bradly in the Tawahi district of Aden in 1940. It was mainly to give military news about the Second World War, together with information about precautions against air raids. Aden Radio was then established on 7 August 1954. Mukalla radio was established in 1967, soon after the residence of Southern Yemen and Sayun radio in 1973. Television service was established in 1963 in monochrome whereas colour transmission started in the South on 8 March 1981.

=== Northern Yemen ===
Sana’a Radio was established in January 1946 but closed after two years, resuming in 1955. In 1963 another local radio station in Ta’iz was established, and Al-Hodeida in 1969. TV channel service began broadcasting in 1975 in monochrome and colour transmission started in the north in 1979.

=== Unity ===
Yemen was united in 1990 leading to merging of southern and northern authorities and corporations. Mukalla radio channel was reformed, Al-Hodeida was also improved. Haja radio was established later in 2004, Sada and Ibb radio stations in 2007. On the other hand, Yemen TV channels joined space TV channels on Arabsat, Nilesat and some other satellites the years after 1995.

== Radio broadcasting ==
The following table lists some of the radio channels of Yemen Radio and TV Corporation and their operating frequencies in Yemen.

Radio channel	Headquarter	Frequency	Average Power
Sana'a Radio	Sana'a	1008 KHz (Medium wave)	600 kW
Yemen Kurdi FM	Yemen	1005 Medium wave	10 Kw
Sana'a Radio	Sana'a	711 kHz (Medium wave)	200 Kw
Sana'a Radio	Sana'a	837 kHz (Medium wave)	30 Kw
Sana'a Radio	Sana'a	6135 kHz (Shortwave)	50 kW
Sana'a Radio	Sana'a	FM: 91.1, 92.5 MHz	N/A
Aden Radio	Aden	792 kHz (Medium wave)	750 Kw
Radio al-Hob	Al-Hob	727.3GHz (GHz)	457kW

Sana'a Radio and Aden Radio also broadcast via satellite radio besides shortwave, medium wave and FM.

Also Yemen Radio and TV Corporation has local radio stations for most Governorates of Yemen or other Cities like:

- Yemen Kurdi FM
- Al Hudaydah Radio
- Hajjah Radio
- Ta'izz Radio
- Mukalla Radio
- Say'un Radio
- Shabwah Radio
- Sa'dah Radio
- Abyan Radio
- Al Mahrah Radio
- Lahij Radio

== See also ==
- Television in Yemen
