= Al-Jumhuryah =

Yemeni newspaper

Al-Jumhuriya
- Type: Daily newspaper
- Format: Broadsheet
- Publisher: Al Gomhuryah Establishment for Journalism and Publishing
- Founded: 1962; 64 years ago
- Political alignment: Pro-Hadi government
- Language: Arabic
- Headquarters: Taiz, Yemen
- Circulation: 15,000
- Website: algomhoriah.com

Al-Jumhuriya (Arabic: الجمهورية The Republic) is a leading newspaper in Yemen based in Taiz. The newspaper was founded in 1962, and has a pro-government stance.

The paper was founded by the Yemen Arab Republic government entity the Saba General Organization for Press alongside Al-Thawra newspaper.

The newspaper was closed for four years due to the onset of the 2015 Yemen Civil War which led to a partial destruction of its headquarters and the looting of its equipment. The newspaper reopened in October 2018 and has a pro-Hadi government stance.

== See also ==
- Al-Thawra (Yemen)
- List of newspapers in Yemen
