= Aden TV =

Yemeni public TV channel

Aden TV قناة عدن الفضائية
- Country: Yemen
- Broadcast area: Arab countries
- Headquarters: Aden, Yemen

Programming
- Language: Arabic

Ownership
- Owner: Government of Yemen

History
- Launched: 11 September 1964

Links
- Website: twitter.com/adentv64

Aden TV (Arabic: قناة عدن) is the second public national television channel in Yemen. The station is based in Aden. It was established in 1964 by British protection in Aden following the Aden Emergency. It started broadcasting on 11 September 1964. At the time of launch, it was the third television station in the Arabian Peninsula. The channel was suspended for a brief period in 2015, resuming its broadcasts later that year.
