= Almigdad Mojalli =

Yemeni journalist (c. 1981–2016)

- Born: ca. 1981
- Died: January 17, 2016 (Aged 35); Between Hamam Jaref and Sana'a, Yemen
- Cause of death: Saudi airstrike
- Education: Sanaa University
- Occupations: Journalist, media fixer and translator
- Years active: 2006–2016
- Employer: Voice of America
- Known for: Journalism
- Style: Humanitarian work
- Spouse: married
- Children: Abdulaziz (Son)
- Relatives: Abdullah Mojalli (Brother)

Almigdad Mojalli (Arabic: المقداد مجلي; c. 1981 – 17 January 2016) was a Yemeni freelance journalist working for the United States media service Voice of America. On 17 January 2016 Mojalli was killed by a Saudi airstrike in a village near Sanaa while attempting to report on the Saudi Arabian-led intervention in Yemen.

== Personal ==
Almigdad Mojalli was born in 1981 in Sana'a, Yemen. Mojalli was a student at Sana'a University from 2002 to 2005, at which time he graduated with a bachelor's degree of English Language. He was married at the time of his death and has a son, Abdelaziz.

== Career ==
Mojalli was a freelance journalist who wrote for many different companies, such as Voice of America radio, The Daily Telegraph (United Kingdom) newspaper, Al Jazeera (Qatar) and the IRIN news agency for the United Nations. Since October 2006, Mojalli had been working for Voice of America. Before his death, he had been reporting mainly about the humanitarian crisis of the Yemeni Civil War (2015–present)'s victims and the impact of the intervention on Yemen.

== Death ==
Almigdad Mojalli was killed in Hamam Jarif, Yemen, which is outside of the capital city Sana'a, Yemen.

Almigdad Mojalli received threats from Houthi government officials before his death in 2016. He was threatened with confinement several times and was accused of being a spy for Saudi Arabia and the United States. He also avoided arrest and kidnap numerous times while on assignments. [information needs to be verified independently as the link doesn't exit]

Almigdad Mojalli was killed by a Saudi airstrike Sunday morning, January 17, 2016 in Hamam Jarif, Yemen. While on an assignment for Voice of America, the Saudi-led coalition conducted an air raid that struck Mojalli, while he was on assignment to find and interview witnesses of an airstrike that had killed 15 civilians the week before outside Sana'a. Mojalli and his colleagues, who were traveling by car, arrived in the eastern village Hamam Jarif, they observed coalition jets circling above them. The airstrike injured Mojalli, causing severe wounds to his stomach, neck and face. While Mojalli was covered in blood, his colleagues Bahir Hameed and the driver Al-Sumaei bandaged him by wrapping a scarf around his injuries. His colleagues then carried him to the car and laid him in the back. Al-Sumaei, the driver, asked Hameed to drive as he was also injured. Hammed couldn't drive for more than 10 meters because he was in shock and stopped. Sumaei took over and after 10 minutes they arrived at a small clinic, which was poorly stocked and unable to treat Mojalli's wounds. The man in the clinic told them to go to the town of Belad al-Roos. They drove to a hospital in Sana'a, but by that time Mojalli was pronounced dead.

== Context ==
Yemen has been in a civil war since 2015 in which dozens of schools and hospitals have been bombed by deadly airstrikes. The intervention was initiated after the Houthi rebellion, which is a Zaydi Shia Islam group led by Abdulmalik Al-Houthi, and the takeover of Sana'a. The Houthis are accused by Saudi Arabia to be sponsored by Iran. Saudi Arabia began its air raids on the country in support of Hadi's government.

The attacks started hitting civilian targets. Several civilians were killed by Saudi strikes while sleeping in their homes and the media has been silent on these attacks. More than 8,100 civilians have been wounded and killed since the start of this war in early 2015.

== Impact ==
Almigdad Mojalli wrote humanitarian stories because he did not believe in fighting. His stories often focused on international events and bringing awareness to the poverty, gender inequality and challenges. More than 5,600 people have been reported killed in Yemen's conflict and over 26,000 have been injured. There have been urges toward the Government to bring an end to this conflict. There are greater urges to offer better protection to international aid workers, civilians and journalists.

== Reactions ==
Irina Bokova, director-general of UNESCO, said "I call on all parties to make sure that journalists are able to carry out their work in the safest possible conditions, in keeping with the Geneva Conventions and UN Security Council resolution 2222, which was adopted last year to improve the safety of journalists in conflict situations."

The attack was condemned by Reporters Without Borders, which released the following statement: "RSF reminds all the parties to the armed conflict in Yemen that they are required to respect journalists by UN Security Council Resolution 2222, adopted in 2015, and by the Geneva Conventions."

A spokesperson for the Committee to Protect Journalists said, "Almigdad Mojalli's terrible death highlights the extreme risks reporters face as they cover the fighting in Yemen. All Parties to this conflict must take every possible step to protect journalists trying to of their job."

BBG CEO and Director John Lansing said, "Almigdad Mojalli was a committed and talented journalist who made the ultimate sacrifice to report on the difficult, but important, stories coming out of Yemen."

VOA Director Kelu Chao said, "Truth telling on the ground in the midst of conflict is a serious endeavor. Reporting on the tragic nature of war requires fortitude and a willingness to take risks. Mr. Mojalli was a fine journalist and an example of us all. We mourn the loss of this courageous man."

== See also ==
- List of journalists killed in Yemen
