= Yemen TV =

National public television station

- Country: Yemen
- Headquarters: Sanaa, Aden

Programming
- Language: Arabic

History
- Founded: 1975; 51 years ago
- Launched: September 24, 1975; 50 years ago
- Former names: Sana'a TV (1975–1990)

Links
- Website: yementv.tv (Arabic); en.yementv.tv (English); fr.yementv.tv (French); fa.yementv.tv (Persian); zh.yementv.tv (Chinese)

Availability

Streaming media
- YemenTV on web: YemenTV

Yemen TV (Arabic: الفضائية اليمنية) is the public national television station in Yemen and is also a governmental entity of Yemen. Its terrestrial network broadcasts throughout Yemen and border areas in Saudi Arabia and Oman, and may reach as far as Djibouti 24 hours a day.

== History ==
The channel began television broadcasting only in 1975, when it opened a television broadcast station in Sanaa on September 24 of that year. Its broadcasting gradually expanded to cover most of the country, and it switched to colour broadcasting in the same year.

After unification of North Yemen and South Yemen to form the present day Republic of Yemen, the channel continued to enjoy the title of the national broadcaster of the new united Yemen.

Yemen TV, alongside many other Arab television channels joined Intelsat-59 in 1995 where it started broadcasting on satellite starting 20 December 1995. It later expanded broadcasting onto Arabsat (2A). A second channel was added in 2000.

On 19 January 2015, the Houthis seized the channel.

The channel then split into two factions: one pro-government (loyal to The recognized Yemeni government), the other pro-Houthi. On 21 January, the director of the channel resigned.

The station's director of the pro-Houthis faction was killed, along with his entire family, on 9 February 2016 by an air strike of the Saudi-led coalition during the latter's intervention in Yemen.

On 19 February 2016, a cameraman of the Hadi faction was killed in Ta'izz.

== See also ==
- Television in Yemen
