= Al-Thawra (Yemen) =

Yemeni newspaper

Al-Thawra الثورة
- Type: Daily newspaper
- Format: Broadsheet
- Owner(s): Government of Yemen (100%) (prior 2015); Houthis (100%) (as of 2015)
- Publisher: Al-Thawra Press & Publishing
- Founded: 29 September 1962; 63 years ago
- Political alignment: Pro-Houthi
- Language: Arabic
- Headquarters: Sana'a, Yemen
- Website: althawrah.ye

Al-Thawra (Arabic: الثورة The Revolution) is a Yemeni newspaper. It was founded on 29 September 1962, and celebrated its golden jubilee in 2012.

The paper was founded by the Yemen Arab Republic government entity the Saba General Organization for Press alongside Al-Jumhuryah newspaper. Al-Thawra is based in Sana'a and had a pro-government stance. After the Houthi takeover in Yemen in 2015, the Houthi's captured Al-Thawra and turned it into a pro-Houthi outlet circulated only in the north of Yemen.

== See also ==
- Al-Jumhuryah
- List of newspapers in Yemen
