= 14 October (newspaper) =

Daily newspaper in Yemen

- Type: Daily newspaper
- Publisher: 14th October Foundation for Journalism, Printing and Publishing
- Editor-in-chief: Ahmed Mohammed Alhubaishi
- Founded: 1967; 58 years ago
- Language: Arabic
- Headquarters: Aden, Yemen
- Country: Yemen
- Website: 14 October

14 October is an Arabic daily newspaper published in Aden, Yemen. The paper has been in circulation since 1967. The paper was named after the revolution in the South of Yemen on 14 October 1967.

== History and profile ==
14 October was started in 1967. It is published in Arabic and is headquartered in Aden. It was formerly run by the government of South Yemen before the reunification in 1990. As of 2001 Ibrahim Al-Kaf was the editor-in-chief of the paper.

14 October is run by the state of Yemen, and its publisher is the 14th October Foundation for Journalism, Printing and Publishing. As of 2014 Ahmed Mohammed Alhubaishi was the editor-in-chief of the daily. Another editor-in-chief was Riadh Mahfouz Sharaf who escaped Aden in August 2019 when the offices of the paper were occupied by the militants allegedly supported by the United Arab Emirates.

14 October mostly provides news offered by the Saba news agency, the official news agency of Yemen. At the end of 2010, the paper had a circulation of 20,000 copies.

== See also ==
- List of newspapers in Yemen
