= Suhail TV =

Suhail TV قناة سهيل الفضائية
- Country: Yemen

Programming
- Language(s): Arabic

Ownership
- Owner: Al-Islah (Yemen)

History
- Launched: 2009

Links
- Website: www.suhail.net

Suhail TV (Arabic: قناة سهيل الفضائية) is a Yemeni television station affiliated with the Al-Islah party. It started broadcasting in 2009 from Sanaa, but moved abroad after being raided by the Houthis in 2014.
