= Bani Qa'is district =

Coordinates: 15°35′N 43°25′E

Bani Qa'is District مديرية بني قيس
- District
- Interactive map of Bani Qa'is District
- Country: Yemen
- Governorate: Hajjah

Population (2003)
  - Total: 54,272
- Time zone: UTC+3 (Yemen Standard Time)

Bani Qa'is District (Arabic: مديرية بني قيس الطور) is a district of the Hajjah Governorate, Yemen. In 2003, the district had a population of 54,272.
