= Al-Masirah =

Yemeni television channel

- Headquarters: Beirut, Lebanon

Programming
- Languages: Arabic, English

Ownership
- Owner: Houthi movement

History
- Launched: 2012

Links
- Website: masirahtv.net (Arabic) english.masirahtv.net (English)

Al-Masirah (Arabic: المسيرة al-Masirah, which means "The Journey") is a Yemeni TV channel owned by the Houthi movement which was launched in 2012. It is headquartered in Beirut, Lebanon.

== History ==
The President of the board of Al-Masirah is Mohammed Abdulsalam who is also Houthis official spokesman and their chief negotiator.

Al-Masirah was founded by the Houthi movement in January 2012 in Beirut, Lebanon and is located next to Hezbollah’s Al Manar TV with backup studios at Hezbollah headquarters. The channel launched its first test broadcast on 23 March 2012, on the Nilesat satellite.

== Channel frequency during Saudi-led coalition on Yemen ==
On 10 May 2015, Al-Masirah, along with other anti-Saudi channels, were closed on Nile Sat & Euro Sat due to Saudi pressure on the satellite companies, which made Al-Masirah broadcast its signal instead on the Russian satellite Express AM44. After several months of being banned on Nile Sat, broadcast is now online on Nile Sat.

== Killed journalists and media workers ==
After the Houthi takeover in Yemen, Al-Masirah lost a number of employees due to conflict.

- On 4 January 2015, Al-Masirah Journalist Khaled al-Washli was killed by an exploding bomb as he covered attempts to defuse it.
- On 17 September 2015, Bilal Sharaf al-Deen was covering an airstrike, when he was killed by a following airstrike.
- On 21 January 2016, 17-year-old TV cameraman Hashem al-Hamran was mortally injured by an air-strike by the Saudi-led coalition in the city of Dahian in Saada Governorate, when he was filming bombing raids for al-Masirah. He died from his wounds on 22 January 2016. The YJS, the IFJ and Irina Bokova, Director General of UNESCO, condemned the killing of Hashem Al Hamran.

== U.S. seizure of online sites ==
On June 22, 2021, United States law enforcement agencies seized a number of domains associated with Al-Masirah.

== See also ==
- Television in Yemen
- List of journalists killed in Yemen
