= Bin Dagher Cabinet =

Cabinet of Yemen

- Cabinet of Yemen
- Date formed: 4 April 2016
- Date dissolved: 15 October 2018

People and organisations
- Head of state: Abdrabbuh Mansur Hadi
- Head of government: Ahmed Obaid Bin Dagher

History
- Predecessor: Bahah Cabinet
- Successor: First Maeen Cabinet

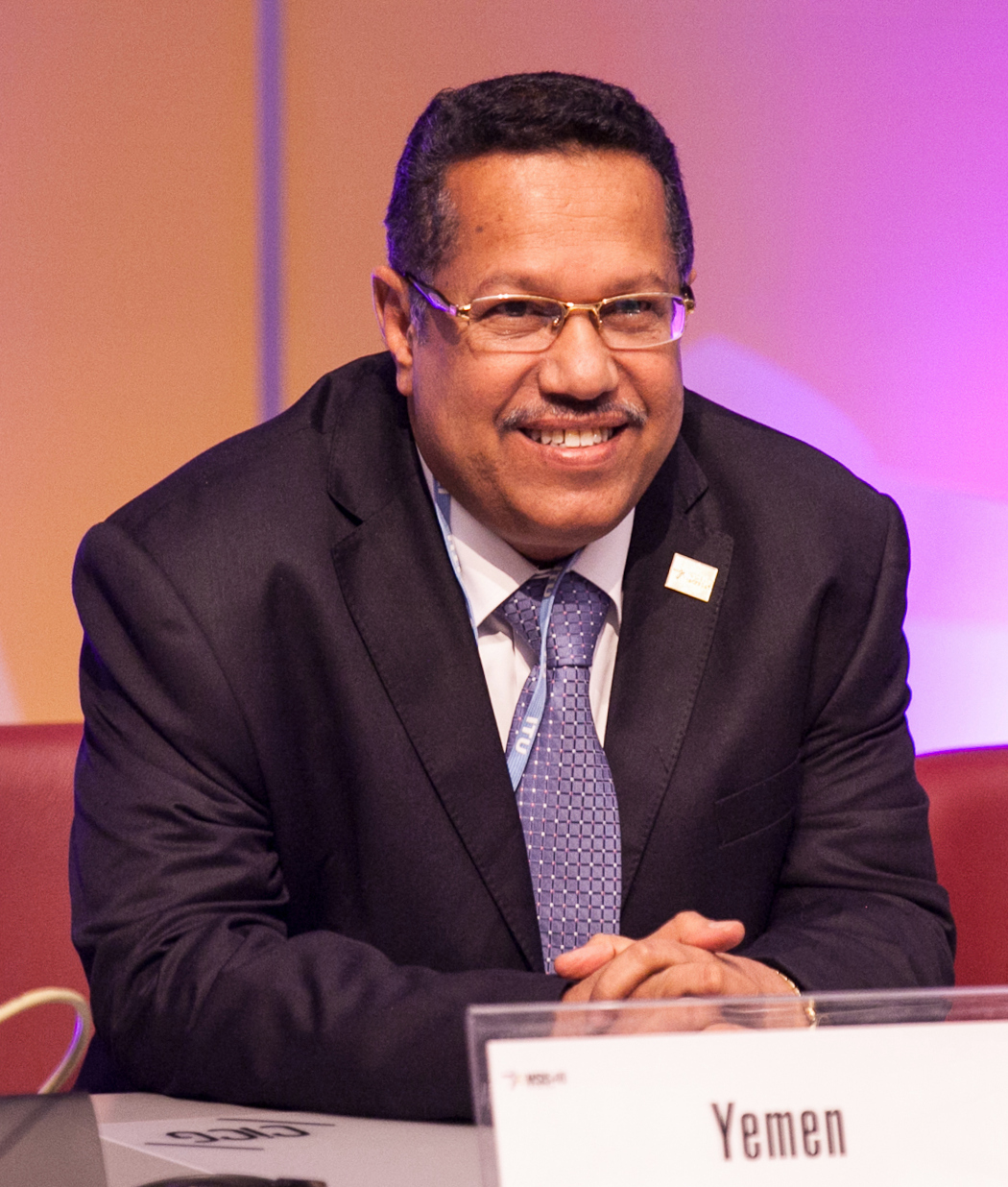
H.E. Mr Ahmed Obaid Bin-Dagher

The cabinet of Yemeni Prime Minister Ahmed Obaid Bin Dagher was sworn in before President Abdrabbuh Mansur Hadi on 4 April 2016.

== List of ministers ==
| Office | Minister |
|---|---|
| Prime Minister | Ahmed Obaid Bin Dagher |
| Deputy Prime Minister | Ahmed al-Maisari (24 December 2017 – ) |
| Minister of Foreign Affairs | Abdulmalek al-Mekhlafi (4 April 2015 – 23 May 2018) Khaled al-Yamani (23 May 2018 – 19 September 2019) |
| Minister of Defense | Mahmoud al-Subaihi |
| Minister of Interior | Hussein Arab ( 1 December 2015 – 25 December 2017) Ahmed al-Maisari (24 December 2017 – ) |
| Minister of Finance | Munaser al-Qaiti (17 October 2015 – 18 September 2016) Ahmed Obaid al-Fadhli (18 September 2016 – ) |
| Minister of Information | Mohammed Qubati ( – 18 September 2016) Muammar al-Eryani (18 September 2016 – ) |
| Minister of Electricity and Energy | Abdullah al-Akwa ( – 27 November 2018) Mohammed al-Enani (27 November 2018 – ) |
| Minister of Youth and Sport | Nayef al-Bakri |
| Minister of Civil Service and Insurance | Abdulaziz Jubari (1 December 2015 – 20 March 2018) Nabil al-Faqeh (8 August 2018 – ) |
| Minister of State for Parliamentary Affairs and the Shura Council | Othman Mujali ( – 24 December 2017) Mohammed al-Hamiri (24 December 2017 – ) |
| Minister of State for National Dialogue | Yaser al-Rwaini |
| Minister of Health | Naser Ba'awm |
| Minister of Justice | Jamal Mohammed Omar |
| Minister of Higher Education and Scientific Research | Hussein Abulrahman Ba Salameh |
| Minister of Public Works and Highways | Maeen Abdulmalik Saeed |
| Minister of Social Affairs and Labour | Ibtyhaj al-Kamal |
| Minister of Tourism | Muammar al-Eryani ( – 18 September 2016) Mohammed Qubati (18 September 2016 – ) |
| Minister of Oil and Minerals | Saif Mohsen AL-Sharif Aws al-Awd (24 December 2017 – ) |
| Minister of Religious Endowments and Guidance | Ahmed Atia |
| Minister of Agriculture and Irrigation | Ahmed al-Maisari (21 October 2015 – 24 December 2017) Othman Mujali (24 December 2017 – ) |
| Minister of Technical Education and Vocational Training | Abdulrazaq al-Ashwal |
| Minister of Culture | Marwan Damaj |
| Minister of Transport | Murad Ali (7 December 2015 – 24 December 2017) Saleh al-Jabwani (24 December 2017 – ) |
| Minister of Human Rights | Azaddin al-Asbahi |
| Minister of Legal Affairs | Nihal al-Awlaqi |
| Minister of Local Administration | Abdulraqeeb Fath |
| Minister of Fisheries Wealth | Fahed Kafayn |
| Minister of Planning and International Cooperation | Mohammed al-Sadi |
| Minister of Telecommunications and Information Technology | Lutfi Bashuraif |
| Minister of Industry and Trade | Mohammed al-Maitami |
| Minister of Water and Environment | Azi Shuraim |
| Minister of Education | Abdullah Salem Lamlas |
| Minister of Sana’a Secretariat | Abdulghani Jamail |
| Minister of State | Hani bin Bureik |
| Minister of State | Abdurabu al-Salami |

== See also ==
- Politics of Yemen
