= Second Maeen Cabinet =

Cabinets of Yemen

- Cabinet of Yemen
- Date formed: 18 December 2020
- Date dissolved: 5 February 2024

People and organisations
- Head of state: Abdrabbuh Mansur Hadi, Rashad al-Alimi
- Head of government: Maeen Abdulmalik Saeed

History
- Predecessor: First Maeen Cabinet
- Successor: Bin Mubarak Cabinet

Second Maeen cabinet is the previous cabinet of Yemen led by Maeen Abdulmalek since 18 December 2020. The new government has been made up of 24 ministers and sworn in before President Abdurabbu Mansour Hadi in Riyadh on 26 December 2020.

== List of ministers ==
Office	Incumbent	Start	End
Prime Minister	Maeen Abdulmalik Saeed	15 October 2018	5 February 2024
Minister of Electricity and Energy	Mana'a Saleh Yaslam	28 July 2022	Incumbent
Minister of Interior	Ibrahim Ali Ahmed Haidan	18 December 2020	Incumbent
Minister of Information	Muammar al-Iryani	18 September 2016	Incumbent
Minister of Foreign Affairs	Ahmad Awad bin Mubarak (18 December 2020 – 26 March 2024) Shaea Muhssin (since 26 March 2024)		
Minister of Sana’a Secretariat	Abdelghani Jamil	18 September 2016	Incumbent
Minister of Youth and Sport	Nayef al-Bakri	15 September 2015	Incumbent
Minister of Civil Service and Insurance	Abdel Nasser Al-Wali	18 December 2020	Incumbent
Minister of State for Parliamentary Affairs and the Shura Council	Mohammed Moqbel al-Himyari	25 December 2017	Incumbent
Minister of State for National Dialogue	Najib Mansour Al-Awj	27 November 2018	Incumbent
Minister of Defense	Mohammed Ali Al-Maqdashi (7 November 2018 – 28 July 2022) Mohsen al-Daeri (since 28 July 2022)		
Minister of Health	Qassem Mohammad Qassem Bahaibah	17 December 2020	Incumbent
Minister of Justice	Badr al-Ardah	18 December 2020	Incumbent
Minister of Higher Education and Scientific Research	Khaled Al-Wasabi	18 December 2020	Incumbent
Minister of Public Works and Highways	Salem Mohamed al-Harayzi	28 July 2022	Incumbent
Minister of Social Affairs and Labour	Muhammad Al-Zaouri	18 December 2020	Incumbent
Minister of Tourism	Muammar al-Iryani	18 December 2020	Incumbent
Minister of Oil and Minerals	Saeed Sulaiman al-Shamasi	28 July 2022	Incumbent
Minister of Religious Endowments and Guidance	Mohamed Ahmed Shabiba	18 December 2020	Incumbent
Minister of Finance	Salem Saleh Bin Braik	19 September 2019	Incumbent
Minister of Agriculture and Irrigation	Salem Abdullah Issa Al-Soqotri	18 December 2020	Incumbent
Minister of Technical Education and Vocational	Khaled Al-Wasabi	18 December 2020	Incumbent
Minister of Culture	Muammar al-Iryani	18 December 2020	Incumbent
Minister of Transport	Abdel Salam Hamid	18 December 2020	Incumbent
Minister of Human Rights	Ahmed Mohamed Omar Orman	27 April 2017	Incumbent
Minister of State	Abd Rabbo Saleh Aslami	18 September 2016	Incumbent
Minister of State	Mohammed Abdallah Kouddah	27 November 2017	Incumbent
Minister of Expatriates Affairs	Ahmad Awad bin Mubarak	18 December 2020	26 March 2024
Minister of Legal Affairs	Ahmed Mohamed Omar Orman	18 December 2020	Incumbent
Minister of Local Administration	Hussein Abdul Rahman	18 December 2020	Incumbent
Minister of Fisheries Wealth	Salem Abdullah Issa Al-Soqotri	18 December 2020	Incumbent
Minister of Planning and International Cooperation	Waed Abdullah Badhib	18 December 2020	Incumbent
Minister of Telecommunications & Information Technology	Najib al-Awj	18 December 2020	12 December 2023
Minister of Industry and Trade	Mohamed al-Ashwal	18 December 2020	Incumbent
Minister of Water and Environment	Tawfiq al-Sharjabi	18 December 2020	Incumbent
Minister of Education	Tareq Salem al-Abkari	18 December 2020	Incumbent

== See also ==
- Politics of Yemen
