= Basindawa Cabinet =

Government of Yemen from 2011 to 2014

- 8th Cabinet of Yemen
- Date formed: 10 December 2011
- Date dissolved: 21 September 2014

People and organisations
- President: Ali Abdullah Saleh (until 27 February 2012); Abdrabbuh Mansur Hadi (from 27 February 2012)
- Prime Minister: Mohammed Basindawa
- Member parties: General People's Congress; Al-Islah; Yemeni Socialist Party; NUPO; Arab Socialist Ba'ath Party
- Status in legislature: National unity government

History
- Legislature term: 3rd Legislature
- Predecessor: Mujawar Cabinet
- Successor: Bahah Cabinet

The cabinet of Yemeni prime minister Mohammed Basindawa was sworn in on 10 December 2011. Basindwa was appointed on 28 November 2011 by Vice President Abdo Rabbo Mansour Hadi. It was made up 35 ministers – mostly from the General People Congress (GPC) and its allies and the Joint Meeting Parties (JMP) and its partners.

== Composition ==
| Portfolio | Minister | Took office | Left office | Party |
|---|---|---|---|---|
| Prime Minister | Mohammed Basindawa | 10 December 2011 | 21 September 2014 | Independent |
| Minister of Foreign Affairs | Abu Bakr al-Qirbi | 10 December 2011 | 21 September 2014 | GPC |
| Minister of Defense | Mohammed Nasser Ahmed | 10 December 2011 | 21 September 2014 | GPC |
| Minister of Interior | Abdul Qader Qahtan | 10 December 2011 | 21 September 2014 | GPC |
| Minister of Finance | Sakhr Ahmed al-Wajih | 10 December 2011 | 11 June 2014 | Independent |
| Minister of Finance | Mohammad Mansour Zam | 11 June 2014 | 21 September 2014 | Independent |
| Minister of Information | Ahmed Ali al-Amrani | 10 December 2011 | 11 June 2014 | GPC |
| Minister of Information | Nasr Taha Mustafa | 11 June 2014 | 21 September 2014 | Al-Islah |
| Minister of Electricity and Energy | Saleh Hasan Sumai | 10 December 2011 | 11 June 2014 | Independent |
| Minister of Electricity and Energy | Abdullah Mohsen al-Akwa | 11 June 2014 | 21 September 2014 | Al-Islah |
| Minister of Youth and Sports | Muammar al-Eryani | 10 December 2011 | 21 September 2014 | GPC |
| Minister of Civil Service and Insurance | Nabil Shamsan | 10 December 2011 | 21 September 2014 | GPC |
| Minister of Public Health | Ahmed Qassim al-Ansi | 10 December 2011 | 21 September 2014 | Independent |
| Minister of Justice | Murshed Al-Arashani | 10 December 2011 | 21 September 2014 | Al-Islah |
| Minister of Higher Education and Scientific Research | Yahya al-Shu'aibi | 10 December 2011 | 4 July 2012 | Independent |
| Minister of Higher Education and Scientific Research | Yahya al-Shu'aibi | 4 July 2012 | 21 September 2014 | GPC |
| Minister of Public Works and Highways | Omar al-Kurshumi | 10 December 2011 | 21 September 2014 | GPC |
| Minister of Social Affairs and Labour | Amat al-Razzaq Hummad | 10 December 2011 | 21 September 2014 | GPC |
| Minister of Tourism | Qasim Sallam | 10 December 2011 | 21 September 2014 | Ba'ath Party |
| Minister of Oil and Minerals | Hisham Sharaf | 10 December 2011 | 7 March 2014 | GPC |
| Minister of Oil and Minerals | Khaled Bahah | 7 March 2014 | 11 June 2014 | Independent |
| Minister of Oil and Minerals | Ahmed Abdul Qader Shayyeh | 11 June 2014 | 16 June 2014 | Independent |
| Minister of Oil and Minerals | Hussein Rasheed Jamal al-Kaf | 16 June 2014 | 21 September 2014 | Independent |
| Minister of Religious Endowments and Guidance | Hamoud Muhammed Ou'bad | 10 December 2011 | 21 September 2014 | GPC |
| Minister of Agriculture and Irrigation | Farid Ahmed Mujawar | 10 December 2011 | 21 September 2014 | GPC |
| Minister of Technical Education and Vocational Training | Abdul-Hafez Nomu'an | 10 December 2011 | 21 September 2014 | Ba'ath Party |
| Minister of Culture | Abdullah Aubal Mandhouq | 10 December 2011 | 21 September 2014 | Yemeni Unionist Gathering |
| Minister of Transport | Wa'ed Abdullah Bathib | 10 December 2011 | 21 September 2014 | YSP |
| Minister of Human Rights | Hooria Mashhour | 10 December 2011 | 21 September 2014 | Independent |
| Minister of Legal Affairs | Mohammed Ahmed al-Mikhlafi | 10 December 2011 | 21 September 2014 | YSP |
| Minister of Local Administration | Ali Mohamed al-Yazidi | 10 December 2011 | 21 September 2014 | NUPO |
| Minister of Fisheries Wealth | Awadh Saad al-Socatri | 10 December 2011 | 21 September 2014 | GPC |
| Minister of Planning and International Cooperation | Mohammed al-Sa'adi | 10 December 2011 | 21 September 2014 | Al-Islah |
| Minister of Telecommunications & Information Technology | Mohammed al-Sa'adi | 10 December 2011 | 21 September 2014 | Independent |
| Minister of Industry and Trade | Saadaldeen Talib | 10 December 2011 | 21 September 2014 | GPC |
| Minister of Water and Environment | Abdo Razzaz Saleh Khaled | 10 December 2011 | 21 September 2014 | Union of Popular Forces |
| Minister of Education | Abdul-Razzaq Yahya al-Ashwal | 10 December 2011 | 21 September 2014 | Al-Islah |
| Minister of Expatriates Affairs | Mujahid al-Quhali | 10 December 2011 | 21 September 2014 | Nasserist Reform Organisation |
| Minister of State for Cabinet Affairs | Abdullah Hussein al-Bashiri | 10 December 2011 | 21 September 2014 | YSP |
| Ministers of State; Ministers without portfolio | Shaif Ezi Saghir | 10 December 2011 | 21 September 2014 | Nasserist Reform Organisation |
| Ministers of State; Ministers without portfolio | Hasan Ahmed Sharaf al-Din | 7 December 2011 | 29 October 2013 | Party of Truth |
| Minister of State for Parliamentary Affairs and the Shura Council | Rashad Ahmad al-Rassas | 10 December 2011 | 21 September 2014 | GPC |

== See also ==
- Politics of Yemen
