= First Maeen Cabinet =

Cabinet of Yemen

- Cabinet of Yemen
- Date formed: 15 October 2018
- Date dissolved: 26 December 2020

People and organisations
- Head of state: Abdrabbuh Mansur Hadi
- Head of government: Maeen Abdulmalik Saeed

History
- Predecessor: Bin Dagher Cabinet
- Successor: Second Maeen Cabinet

First Maeen Cabinet was a government led by Yemeni prime minister Maeen Abdulmalek from 15 October 2018 to 18 December 2020. On 18 October 2018 Maeen Abdulmalek sworn in before President Abdrabbuh Mansur Hadi.

== List of ministers ==
Office	Minister
Prime Minister	Maeen Abdulmalik Saeed
Minister of Foreign Affairs	Khaled al-Yamani (23 May 2018 – 19 September 2019) Mohammed Al-Hadrami (19 September 2019 -)
Minister of Defense	Mohammed Ali al-Maqdashi ( since 7 November 2018)
Minister of Interior	Ahmed al-Maisari (since 25 December 2017)
Minister of Finance	Ahmed Obaid al-Fadhli (18 September 2016 – 19 September 2019) Salem Saleh bin Bureik (19 September 2019 – )
Minister of Information	Muammar al-Eryani (since 18 September 2016)
Minister of Electricity and Energy	Abdullah al-Akwa (till 27 November 2018) Mohammed al-Enani ( since 27 November 2018)
Minister of Youth and Sport	Nayef al-Bakri
Minister of Civil Service and Insurance	Nabil al-Faqeh
Minister of State for Parliamentary Affairs and the Shura Council	Othman Mujali
Minister of State for National Dialogue	Yaser al-Rwaini
Minister of Health	Naser Ba'awm
Minister of Justice	Jamal Mohammed Omar( until 27 November 2018) Ali Haitham Abdullah ( since 27 November 2018)
Minister of Higher Education and Scientific Research	Hussein Abulrahman Ba Salameh
Minister of Public Works and Highways	Maeen Abdulmalik Saeed
Minister of Social Affairs and Labour	Ibtyhaj al-Kamal
Minister of Tourism	Mohammed al-Qubati
Minister of Oil and Minerals	Aws al-Awd
Minister of Religious Endowments and Guidance	Ahmed Atia
Minister of Agriculture and Irrigation	Othman Mujali
Minister of Technical Education and Vocational	Abdulrazaq al-Ashwal
Minister of Culture	Marwan Damaj
Minister of Transport	Saleh al-Jabwani
Minister of Human Rights	Mohammed Askr
Minister of Legal Affairs	Nihal al-Awlaqi
Minister of Local Administration	Abdulraqeeb Fath
Minister of Fisheries Wealth	Fahed Kafayn
Minister of Planning and International Cooperation	Najib al-Awj
Minister of Telecommunications & Information Technology	Lutfi Bashuraif
Minister of Industry and Trade	Mohammed al-Maitami
Minister of Water and Environment	Azi Shuraim
Minister of Education	Abdullah Salem Lamlas
Minister of Sana’a Secretariat	Abdulghani Jamail

== See also ==
- Politics of Yemen
