= Bahah Cabinet =

Cabinet of Yemen

Khaled Bahah cabinet
- Cabinet of Yemen
- Date formed: 7 November 2014
- Date dissolved: 22 January 2015; 4 April 2016 (small cabinet)

People and organisations
- Head of state: Abdrabbuh Mansur Hadi
- Head of government: Khaled Bahah

History
- Predecessor: Basindawa Cabinet
- Successor: Bin Dagher Cabinet

Bahah cabinet was a Yemeni government led by Yemeni prime minister Khaled Bahah from 7 November 2014 to 22 January 2015. The cabinet was made up 36 ministers.

== List of ministers ==
Office	Portrait	Name	Took office	Left office	Alliance/party
Prime Minister		Khaled Bahah			
Minister of Foreign Affairs		Abdullah al-Saydi			
Minister of Interior		Jalal al-Rowaishan			
Minister of Defense		Mahmoud Ahmed Salem al-Subaihy			
Minister of Finance		Mohammed Zimam			
Minister of Information		Nadia Abdul-Aziz al-Sakaf			
Minister of Electricity and Energy		Abdullah al-Akwa			
Minister of Youth and Sport		Rafat ِAli Al-Akhali			
Minister of Civil Service and Insurance		Ahmed Mohammed Lukman			
Minister of State for Parliamentary Affairs and the Shura Council		Ahmed Mohammed al-Kuhlani			
Minister of Health		Riyadh Yaseen Abdullah			
Minister of Justice		Khalid Abdullah Omar Ba-Junaid			
Minister of Higher Education and Scientific Research		Mohammed bin Mohammed Yahya al-Mutaher			
Minister of Public Works and Highways		Wahi Taha Aman			
Minister of Social Affairs and Labour		Kubool Mohamed Abdul-Malik al-Mutwakel			
Minister of Tourism		Muammar Mutaher al-Eryani			
Minister of Oil and Minerals		Mohammed Abdullah bin Nabhan			
Minister of Religious Endowments and Guidance		Fuad Omar bin Ali bin al-Sheikh Abu Baker			
Minister of Agriculture and Irrigation		Fareed Ahmed Mujawar			
Minister of Technical Education and Vocational Training		Abdul-Razzaq Yahya al-Ashwal			
Minister of Culture		Arwa Abdu Othman			
Minister of Transport		Bader Mohamed Mubarak Ba-Salma			
Minister of Human Rights		Eiz-al-Deen Saeed Ahmed al-Asbahi			
Minister of State for the Implementation of National Dialogue Outcomes		Ghaleb Abdullah Mossed Mutlak			
Minister of State		Hasan Mohamed Zaid			
Minister of State		Sameera Khamees Obeid			
Minister of Legal Affairs		Mohammed Ahmed al-Mikhlafi			
Minister of Local Administration		Abdul Raqeeb Fatah al-Aswadi			
Minister of Fisheries Wealth		Fahad Salem Kefayen			
Minister of Planning and International Cooperation		Mohamed Abdul-Wahed al-Maytami			
Minister of Telecommunications & Information Technology		Lutfy Mohamed Salem Ba-Shareef			
Minister of Industry and Trade		Mohammed Saeed al-Sa'adi			
Minister of Water and Environment		Eizi Hibat-Allah Ali Shuraim			
Minister of Education		Abdul-Lateef Husein Hayder al-Hakimi			
Minister of Expatriates Affaires		Alawi Mohammed Abdul-Qader Bafakeh			
Minister of State		Mohammed Musa al-Amery			

== See also ==
- Politics of Yemen
