= Supreme Political Council =

Houthi executive body

- المجلس السياسي الأعلى

Overview
- Established: 28 July 2016
- Leader: Chairman (head of state): Mahdi al-Mashat; Prime Minister (head of gov't): Muhammad Ahmed Miftah
- Ministries: Government of Change and Construction
- Headquarters: Sanaa
- Website: yemen.gov.ye (dead) (27 April 2021 archive)

Territory controlled by the Houthis before the 2026 Yemen offensives

The Supreme Political Council (SPC; Arabic: المجلس السياسي الأعلى, romanized: al-Majlis as-Siyāsiyy al-ʾAʿlā), also referred to as the Sanaa government, is an extraconstitutional rival executive established in 2016 in Sanaa by the Houthis and the pro-Houthi faction of the General People's Congress (GPC) to rule areas of Yemen under their control (formerly in the Yemen Arab Republic, AKA North Yemen) opposed to the internationally recognized Presidential Leadership Council (PLC) in Aden. The SPC carries out the functions of head of state in Yemen, appointing the country's cabinet and managing Yemeni state affairs in a bid to fill in political vacuum during the Yemeni Civil War. The Council aims to outline a basis for running the country and managing state affairs on the basis of the constitution. Since 2018, the SPC has been headed by Mahdi al-Mashat as Chairman of the Council.

The SPC was formed on 28 July 2016 with an initial ten members and was headed by Saleh Ali al-Sammad as president and Qassem Labozah as vice-president. The members were sworn in on 14 August 2016, and the next day the Supreme Revolutionary Committee (SRC) handed power to the Supreme Political Council. After al-Sammad was killed in a drone strike on 19 April 2018, chairmanship of the SPC passed to Mahdi al-Mashat. The Cabinet of Yemen is subordinate to the SPC, which appoints it and supervises government officials who oversee relevant ministries; since 2016 two governments have been established under the council. In 2016 the SPC appointed former Aden governor Abdel-Aziz bin Habtour to form a ministry known as the National Salvation Government (NSG). In September 2023 the NSG was dismissed and replaced by a caretaker administration which continued to be headed by Habtour. In August 2024 a Presidential resolution appointed Ahmad al-Rahawi as the head of a new ministry known as the 'Government of Change and Construction' (GCC). Eight days later the House of Representatives (in Sanaa) approved the cabinet and called for a 36-point 'general program'. However, on August 28, 2025 Israel launched Operation Lucky Drop, assassinating the Prime Minister amongst other government officials of the SPC. On August 30, 2025, after confirming the assassinations, the Houthis appointed Muhammad Ahmed Miftah as the new Prime Minister of the SPC. The assassination of the SPC's Defense Minister has not yet been confirmed by the Houthis.

The SPC remains internationally unrecognized compared to the PLC in Aden and is acknowledged only by Iran, with the Houthis placing an ambassador to Iran in August 2019. The formation of the SPC has been condemned by the international community; with the United Nations (UN) officially describing the act as "a clear violation of the Yemeni constitution" and denounced the council for sabotaging the Yemeni peace process.

== Background ==
Yemen prior to the 1990 unification

The Houthis, a Zaydi Shia revivalist political and military organization from northern Yemen, have been involved in conflicts with the Yemeni government since the early 2000s, especially with former Yemeni president Ali Abdullah Saleh.

Since January 2010 during the Houthi insurgency, the Houthis have maintained de facto governance over significant portions of northern and western Yemen, including the capital, Sanaa since 2014. Their administration, the Supreme Political Council, operates in opposition to the internationally recognized government of Yemen. The Houthis aim to govern all of Yemen and support external movements against the United States, Israel, and Saudi Arabia. Because of the Houthis' ideological background, the conflict in Yemen is widely seen as a front of the Iran–Saudi Arabia proxy war.

In September 2014, after the Battle of Sanaa and during the Houthi takeover of Yemen of the Yemeni civil war, Houthi insurgents expanded their influence dramatically by seizing the capital, Sanaa, and ousting president Abdrabbuh Mansur Hadi. A Saudi Arabian-led military intervention in 2015 aimed at restoring Hadi's government, but it sparked a prolonged and devastating war, and several proto-state entities claim to govern Yemen.

In the wake of the resignations of President Abdrabbuh Mansur Hadi and prime minister Khaled Bahah over the Houthi takeover of the Presidential Palace in January 2015, Houthi leader Abdul Malik Al Houthi reportedly proposed a six-member "transitional presidential council" which would have equal representation from the North and South of Yemen, although this proposal was rejected by the Southern Movement. Nevertheless, on 1 February, the Houthis gave an ultimatum to Yemen's political factions warning that if they did not reach a solution to the current political crisis, then the Houthi "revolutionary leadership" would assume formal authority over the state. According to Reuters, political factions have agreed to form an interim presidential council to manage the country for up to one year. Former South Yemen president Ali Nasser Mohammed was originally being considered as a prospective interim leader, but Mohammed later declined the post.

On 6 February 2015, the Houthis formally assumed over authority in Sanaa, declaring the dissolution of House of Representatives and announced that a "presidential council" would be formed to lead Yemen for two years, while a "revolutionary committee" would be put in charge of forming a new, 551-member national council. This governance plan was later affirmed by Houthi Ansarullah politburo leader Saleh Ali al-Sammad as he said that the national council would choose a five-member presidential council to govern the country.

After seizing the capital in September 2014, the Houthis obtained the resignations of President Abdrabbuh Mansur Hadi, Prime Minister Khaled Bahah, and the cabinet in January 2015 and then moved to dissolve parliament and instated the Supreme Revolutionary Committee to govern their territory of Yemen on 6 February 2015. However, despite their military successes and an alleged alliance with the former ruling General People's Congress, the Houthis faced widespread domestic and international opposition to the coup and they assented to United Nations–led talks on a power-sharing deal. At least one analyst went so far as to suggest the Houthis' declaration "fizzled" in the days after it was announced, although they have Ali Abdullah Saleh's political support.

On 21 February 2015, one month after Houthi militants confined him to his residence in Sanaa, Hadi slipped out of the capital and traveled to Aden, the capital of the former People's Democratic Republic of Yemen. In a televised address from his hometown, he declared that the Houthi takeover was illegitimate and indicated he remained the constitutional president of Yemen. Hadi's ex-ministers were released by the Houthis on 16 March as a "goodwill gesture". On 21 March, Hadi officially proclaimed Aden to be the temporary capital of Yemen, until his pledged recapture of Sana'a. Within days, however, a Houthi-led military campaign wrested much of southern Yemen from Hadi's loyalists, prompting Hadi to flee his presidential palace in Aden and Saudi Arabia to launch airstrikes against Houthi positions throughout the country.

== Administrative control ==
Territory controlled by the Houthis shown in teal.

As of March 2025, the Houthis control Sanaa, the capital and largest city of Yemen, as well as most of the country's northwestern region, including the Red Sea coastline. In 2021 the US government estimated that the Houthis controlled approximately one-third of Yemen’s territory. This territory contained approximately 70 to 80 percent of the population.

=== Governance and administration ===
The Houthis have established a parallel government known as the Supreme Political Council, headquartered in Sanaa. While not internationally recognized, the SPC administers civil services, taxation, and law enforcement in Houthi-held areas. Since 2018, the SPC has been headed by Mahdi al-Mashat as Chairman of the Council.

== International relations ==
The Supreme Political Council currently only has diplomatic relations with Iran, which provides it with military and logistical support, though Iran denies direct involvement. Relations with Ba'athist Syria existed between 2015 and 2023. Additionally, the government allegedly has diplomatic contacts with Russia, North Korea, and Abkhazia. In 2015, The Wall Street Journal reported that the government would seek contacts with China, Iran, and Russia. In 2016, a National Salvation Government official had invited several North Korean diplomats to Damascus. The same year, a delegation of the National Salvation government visited Russia and met the Russian Deputy Minister of Foreign Affairs. In 2017, Foreign Minister Hisham Sharaf Abdullah met with the chargés d’affaires of the Russian and the Syrian Embassy in Sanaa. In August 2019, the National Salvation government appointed an Ambassador to Tehran. In early 2020, the Saba News Agency reported that Hisham Sharaf Abdullah called China a "friendly government". In October 2020, Iran appointed Hasan Irlu as its ambassador to Sanaa. Two months later, the United States sanctioned Irlu. In August 2020, the National Salvation government appointed an ambassador to Damascus. In March 2021, the National Salvation government appointed Ambassador in Damascus met with the Abkhaz Ambassador to Syria. In October 2023, Syria expelled representatives of the National Salvation government from the Yemeni embassy in Damascus.

The President, the Parliament Speaker and the Foreign Minister of the National Salvation government have sent numerous diplomatic notes to a wide range of countries such as Algeria, Bahamas, Comoros, Kiribati, Malawi, Malta, Mongolia, Montenegro, Slovenia, South Sudan, Venezuela and Uzbekistan.

The Houthis' conflict with Saudi Arabia has led to cross-border attacks, including missile and drone strikes on Saudi and Emirati targets. As of 2026, the group has also been designated a terrorist organization by the United States, Malaysia, Australia, Canada, New Zealand, several Gulf nations and Costa Rica.

== Current members ==
The Ministry of Foreign Affairs lists the following members of the SPC:

Sr. No.	Status	Name
1	Chairman	Mahdi al-Mashat
2	Vice Chairman	Sadeq Amin Abu Rass
3	Prime Minister	Muhammad Ahmed Miftah
4	Member	Muhammad Ali al-Houthi
5	Member	Jaber Abdullah Ghaleb Al-Wahbani
6	Member	Mubarak Saleh Al-Mishn al-Zaidi
7	Member	Sultan Ahmed Abd Rabbo al-Samei
8	Member	Khaled Mohammed Saeed al-Dini
9	Member	Salih Mabkhout al-Nuaimi

== Cabinets ==
=== Government of Change and Construction (2024–present) ===
On 10 August 2024, Ahmed al-Rahawi was appointed as prime minister of Yemen and tasked with forming a ministry known as the 'Government of Change and Construction' by the President of the Supreme Political Council Mahdi al-Mashat. Two days later the composition of the new government was announced in a presidential resolution. On 18 August 2024, the House of Representatives (San'aa) gave confidence to the government and called on it to follow a 36-point 'general program' prepared by a house of representatives special committee. The government and SPC continue to be internationally unrecognised in comparison with the Presidential Leadership Council (PLC).

On 28 August 2025, a series of Israeli airstrikes killed Rahawi and nine other ministers.

Incumbent
† Assassinated

Government of Change and Construction
Portfolio (ministries)	Minister	Term start	Term end	Ref
Prime Minister of Yemen	Ahmed al-Rahawi	10 August 2024	28 August 2025 †	
Prime Minister of Yemen	Muhammad Ahmed Miftah	30 August 2025	Incumbent	
First Deputy Prime Minister	Muhammad Ahmed Miftah	12 August 2024	30 August 2025	
Deputy Prime Minister for Defence and Security Affairs	Lt-General Jalal Ali Ali Al-Rowaishan	12 August 2024	Incumbent	
Deputy Prime Minister for Administration, Local and Rural Development	Mohamed Hassan Ismail Al-Madani	12 August 2024	Incumbent	
Minister of Defense	Maj-General Mohamed al-Atifi	12 August 2024	Incumbent	
Ministry of Interior	Maj-General Abdul Karim Amir al-Din al-Houthi	12 August 2024	Incumbent	
Minister of Justice and Human Rights	Judge Mujahid Ahmed Abdullah Ali	12 August 2024	28 August 2025 †	
Minister of Civil Service and Administrative Development	Khaled Hussein Saleh Al-Hawali	12 August 2024	Incumbent	
Minister of Transport and Public Works	Maj-General Mohamed Ayyash Mohamed Qahim	12 August 2024	Incumbent	
Minister of Finance	Abdul-Jabbar Ahmed Mohammed Mohammed	12 August 2024	Incumbent	
Minister of Economy, Industry and Investment	Moeen Hashem Ahmed Al-Mahagri	12 August 2024	28 August 2025 †	
Minister of Agriculture, Fisheries and Water Resources	Radwan Ali Ali Al-Rubai	12 August 2024	28 August 2025 †	
Minister of Education and Scientific Research	Hassan Abdullah Yahya Al-Saadi	12 August 2024	Incumbent	
Minister of Foreign Affairs and Emigrants	Jamal Amer	12 August 2024	28 August 2025 †	
Minister of Oil and Minerals	Abdullah Abdulaziz Abdulrahman Al-Amir	12 August 2024	Incumbent	
Minister of Electricity, Energy and Water	Ali Saif Mohamed Hassan	12 August 2024	28 August 2025 †	
Minister of Health and Environment	Ali Abdul Karim Ali Shaiban	12 August 2024	Incumbent	
Minister of Culture and Tourism	Ali Qasim Hussein Al Yafei	12 August 2024	28 August 2025 †	
Minister of Social Affairs and Labour	Samir Mohamed Ahmed Bajaala	12 August 2024	28 August 2025 †	
Minister of Information	Hashem Ahmed Abdulrahman Sharafuddin	12 August 2024	28 August 2025 †	
Minister of Youth and Sports	Mohamed Ali Ahmed Al-Mawlid	12 August 2024	28 August 2025 †	
Minister of Communications and Information Technology	Mohammed Ahmed Mohammed Al-Mahdi	12 August 2024	Incumbent	

=== National Salvation Government (2016–2023) ===
On 2 October 2016, Abdel-Aziz bin Habtour was appointed as prime minister by the Houthis. On 4 October, he formed his cabinet. The cabinet was composed of members of the Southern Movement. However, the cabinet was not internationally recognized.

On 28 November 2016, a new cabinet was formed. It was only composed of members of the pro-Saleh GPC and the Houthis.

The UN Special Envoy for Yemen, Ismail Ould Cheikh Ahmed, said the move was "a new and unnecessary obstacle. Yemen is at a critical juncture. The actions recently taken by Ansarullah and the General People's Congress will only complicate the search for a peaceful solution. The parties must hold Yemen’s national interests above narrow partisan ambitions and take immediate steps to end political divisions and address the country’s security, humanitarian and economic challenges." He further claimed that such an action could harm peace talks.

On 27 October 2020, the Minister of Youth and Sport, Hassan Mohammed Zaid, was shot dead by unknown gunmen in the capital Sanaa.

On 27 September 2023, the National Salvation Government was dismissed and replaced by a caretaker government. Habtour continued as caretaker prime minister before being elevated to the SPC in 2024.

National Salvation Government
Portfolio (ministries)	Minister	Term start	Term end
Prime Minister of Yemen	Abdel-Aziz bin Habtour	4 October 2016	10 August 2024
Deputy Prime Minister for the Affairs of the Security	Jalal al-Rowaishan	28 November 2016	27 September 2023
Deputy Prime Minister for the Affairs of the Service	Mahmoud Abdel Kader al-Jounaïd	1 January 2018	27 September 2023
Deputy Prime Minister for Economic Affairs	Hussein Abdullah Mkabuli	28 November 2016	27 September 2023
Minister of Interior	Abdulhakim Ahmed al-Mawri	13 December 2017	27 September 2023
Minister of Planning and International Cooperation	Abdulaziz Al-Kumaim	July 2017	27 September 2023
Minister of Information	Dhaifallah Qasim Saleh al-Shami	10 November 2018	27 September 2023
Minister of Foreign Affairs	Hisham Sharaf Abdullah	28 November 2016	27 September 2023
Minister of State for National Dialogue Outcomes' Affairs and National Reconciliation	Ahmed Saleh al-Ganie	28 November 2016	27 September 2023
Minister of Youth and Sport	Hassan Mohammed Zaid	28 November 2016	27 October 2020
Minister of Legal Affairs	Abdulrahman Ahmed al-Mukhtar	28 November 2016	27 September 2023
Minister of Education	Yahia Badreddin al-Houthi	28 November 2016	27 September 2023
Minister of Civil Service and Insurance	Talal Aklan	28 November 2016	27 September 2023
Minister of State for Parliamentary Affairs and the Shura Council	Ali Abdullah Abu Hulaykah	28 November 2016	27 September 2023
Minister of Defense	Mohamed al-Atifi	28 November 2016	27 September 2023
Minister of Industry and Trade	Abdu Mohammed Bishr	28 November 2016	27 September 2023
Minister for Fisheries	Mohammad Mohammad al-Zubayri	28 November 2016	27 September 2023
Minister of Justice	Ahmed Abdullah Akabat	28 November 2016	27 September 2023
Minister of Higher Education and Scientific Research	Hussein Ali Hazeb	28 November 2016	27 September 2023
Minister of Social Affairs and Labour	Faiqah al-Sayed Ba'alawy	28 November 2016	27 September 2023
Minister of Tourism	Nasser Mahfouz Bagazkoz	28 November 2016	27 September 2023
Minister of Public Works and Highways	Ghalib Abdullah Mutlaq	28 November 2016	27 September 2023
Minister of Water and Environment	Nabil Abdullah al-Wazair	28 November 2016	27 September 2023
Minister of Petroleum and Minerals	Ahmed Abdullah Naji Dars	1 January 2018	27 September 2023
Minister of Electricity and Energy	Lutf Ali al-Jermouzi	28 November 2016	27 September 2023
Minister of Local Administration	Ali Bin Ali Al-Kays	28 November 2016	27 September 2023
Minister of Religious Endowments and Guidance	Sharaf Ali al-Kulaisi	28 November 2016	27 September 2023
Minister of Expatriate Affairs	Mohammed Saeed al-Mashjari	28 November 2016	27 September 2023
Minister of Finance	Saleh Ahmed Shaaban	28 November 2016	27 September 2023
Minister of Communications and Information Technology	Musfer Abdullah Saleh Al-Numeir	16 December 2017	27 September 2023
Minister of Agriculture and Irrigation	Ghazi Ahmed Mohsen	28 November 2016	27 September 2023
Minister of Technical Education and Vocational	Mohsen Ali al-Nakib	28 November 2016	27 September 2023
Minister of Culture	Abdullah Ahmad al-Kibsy	28 November 2016	1 September 2022
Minister of Transport	Zakaria Yahya al-Shami	28 November 2016	21 March 2021
Minister of Human Rights	Alia Faisal Abdullatif al-Shaba	28 November 2016	27 September 2023
Minister(s) of State	Fares Manaa	28 November 2016	27 September 2023
Minister(s) of State	Nabih Mohsen Abu Nashtan	28 November 2016	27 September 2023
Minister(s) of State	Radhiyah Mohammad Abdullah	28 November 2016	27 September 2023
Minister(s) of State	Aubayd Salem bin Dhabia	28 November 2016	27 September 2023
Minister(s) of State	Hamid Awadh al-Mizjaji	28 November 2016	27 September 2023
Minister(s) of State	Abdulaziz Ahmed al-Bakir	28 November 2016	27 September 2023

== Humanitarian situation ==
At least 56,000 civilians and combatants have been killed in armed violence amid the Yemeni civil war since January 2016. The war has resulted in a famine affecting 17 million people. The lack of safe drinking water, caused by depleted aquifers and the destruction of the country's water infrastructure, has also caused the largest, fastest-spreading cholera outbreak in modern history, with the number of suspected cases exceeding 994,000. Over 2,200 people have died since the outbreak began to spread rapidly at the end of April 2017. The ongoing humanitarian crisis and conflict has received widespread criticism for having a dramatic worsening effect on Yemen's humanitarian situation.

The war has led to a severe humanitarian crisis, with Houthi-controlled areas experiencing food shortages, economic decline, and infrastructure damage. The blockade imposed by the Saudi-led coalition, along with internal restrictions on aid, has worsened conditions. Reports from the United Nations and Humanitarian organizations have accused the Houthis of using humanitarian aid as a tool for political leverage.

== See also ==
- Supreme Revolutionary Committee
- Rival government
