= August 2025 Israeli attack on Sanaa =

Israeli strikes targeting Houthi leaders

- Part of the 2025 Israeli attacks in Yemen amidst the Red Sea crisis, and the Middle Eastern crisis (2023–present)
- Location of the attack within Yemen
- Type: Airstrikes, targeted killing, decapitation strike
- Location: Sanaa, Yemen
- Target: Houthi defense minister Mohamed al-Atifi, chief of staff Muhammad Abd al-Karim al-Ghamari, and other government ministers
- Date: 28 August 2025
- Executed by: Israel Defense Forces; Israeli Air Force
- Casualties: At least 13 officials, including prime minister Ahmed al-Rahawi and chief of staff Muhammad al-Ghamari killed

On 28 August 2025, the Israeli Air Force (IAF) conducted targeted strikes, codenamed Operation Lucky Drop (Hebrew: מבצע טיפת מזל) against several Houthi ministers in Bayt Baws, Sanaa, Yemen. The group's prime minister Ahmed al-Rahawi, defense minister Mohamed al-Atifi, and chief of staff Muhammad Abd al-Karim al-Ghamari, who had gathered to listen to a televised speech by Houthi leader Abdul-Malik al-Houthi, were among the targets. The deaths of al-Rahawi and several other ministers were later confirmed by the group, and al-Ghamari's death was confirmed in October.

== Background ==
Following Hamas's October 7 attacks on Israel in 2023, which led to the Gaza war, the Yemeni Houthis began launching missiles and drones at Israel and at a number of international shipping vessels transiting the Red Sea, actions they say are in solidarity with the Palestinians. In response, a United States–led coalition launched a series of missiles and airstrikes against the Houthis, which ended following a ceasefire deal between the US and the Houthis in May 2025. A deadly Houthi attack in Tel Aviv in July 2024 led Israel to launch its first airstrikes on Yemen. Since then, Israel began launching occasional strikes against the Houthis, hitting targets such as Sanaa and Hodeidah.

The 28 August strikes followed a wave of Israeli airstrikes in Sanaa earlier that week on 24 August that killed 10 people and injured 102 others. Among the targets were an oil terminal, a power plant, and a military base near the presidential palace. The strikes came after the Houthis fired a cluster bomb at Israel for the first time. According to Israeli broadcaster Channel 12, Israel prepared to target the Houthi leadership during the 24 August strikes but decided against it. Earlier on 28 August, the Houthis launched two drones towards Israel, which were intercepted.

== Airstrikes ==
According to Hezbollah-linked news outlet Al Mayadeen, on 28 August, at least 10 Israeli airstrikes hit sites in Sanaa, while further attacks took place in the governorates of 'Amran and Hajjah. Saudi news outlet Al-Hadath reported that both the Israeli Air Force and the Israeli Navy partook in the strikes. Asharq al-Awsat reported that three sites were targeted: a home near a water plant, a site in Jabal Atan, and a site near the Houthi-held Presidential Palace used to hold meetings; with one of the buildings being completely destroyed. Tribal leaders told the Associated Press that the strike that killed the Houthi prime minister hit a meeting at a villa in Bayt Baws, southern Sanaa. The meeting was held between government ministers "to evaluate [the government's] activity and performance over the past year", according to the Houthis. Al Jazeera reported damage on Mount Attan, a hill southwest of Sanaa.

Shortly after the attack, the Israel Defense Forces (IDF) confirmed that it carried out an airstrike on a Houthi military site in Sanaa. According to Israeli media, the IAF targeted safe houses where ten top Houthi officials had gathered to watch a televised speech by Houthi leader Abdul-Malik al-Houthi, launching over ten missiles in under five minutes. Israel's KAN News reported that an attack on the presidential palace killed several Houthi political leaders. The IDF confirmed the following day that it targeted the Houthi defense minister and chief of staff.

The Times of Israel reported that Israel had received intelligence at around 1 p.m. that 10 Houthi leaders gathered near Sanaa to listen to al-Houthi's speech. Israeli intelligence then provided real-time information about the gathering, enabling the airstrike, despite a high concentration of air defenses. The operation was monitored by Israeli defense minister Israel Katz and IDF chief of staff Eyal Zamir, while prime minister Benjamin Netanyahu was briefed via a "red phone".

== Casualties ==
Name	Position (SPC)	Ref
Ahmed al-Rahawi	Prime Minister of Yemen	
Hashem Ahmed Sharaf al Din	Minister of Information	
Jamal Ahmed Amer	Minister of Foreign Affairs and Expatriates	
Muin Hashem Ahmed al Mahaqri	Minister of Economy, Industry, and Investment	
Ali Qasim Hussein al Yafii	Minister of Culture and Tourism	
Radwan Ali al Ruba'i	Minister of Agriculture, Fisheries, and Water Resources	
Mohammed Ali al Mawla	Minister of Youth and Sports	
Samir Muhammad Bajala	Minister of Social Affairs and Labour	
Mujahid Ahmed Abdullah Ali	Minister of Justice and Human Rights	
Ali Saif Muhammad	Minister of Electricity, Energy, and Water	
Muhammad Qasim al Kubaisi	Director of the Prime Minister's Office	
Zahed Muhammad al Amidi	Secretary of the Council of Ministers	
Muhammad Abd al-Karim al-Ghamari	Chief of Staff of the Yemeni Armed Forces	

According to Israeli estimates, Houthi defense minister Mohamed al-Atifi and chief of the general staff Muhammad Abd al-Karim al-Ghamari were likely killed in the attacks near the presidential palace, the latter of whom was previously targeted during the Twelve-Day War in June 2025. The two made public statements after the attacks, but have not publicly appeared since. It was reported on 29 August that al-Atifi survived with serious injuries. Additionally, Houthi Prime Minister Ahmed al-Rahawi was reportedly killed alongside several associates in a strike on an apartment in Sanaa's Bayt Baws neighborhood, according to KAN News and Yemeni media. The head of the Houthi-controlled Ministry of Defense, Asaad al-Sharqabi, was also killed, according to Yemeni government sources cited by Reuters.

Ynet reported that Israel had growing confidence that it had killed the "entire military and governmental elite of the Houthis", while Channel 13 said that Israel believed its attack succeeded. According to The Jerusalem Post, there was an "increasing likelihood" that the defense minister and chief of staff were killed. However, whether al-Ghamari was present in any of the targeted locations or if any senior leaders were killed remained unconfirmed. Two months later, on 16 October, the Houthis confirmed that al-Ghamari had died. A later report by Channel 12 said that the IDF assessed that it killed the entire Houthi cabinet, including the prime minister and 12 other officials, although its findings were not definitive.

On 30 August, the Houthis published a statement confirming the death of Rahawi as well as an unspecified number of ministers, while saying that others were seriously or moderately injured. It was later confirmed that 12 people, more than half of the 22-member cabinet, were killed, namely the prime minister, 9 other ministers, and 2 cabinet members. According to the Israeli Army Radio, among the dead were the director of the political bureau, the prime minister's chief of staff, secretary of cabinet, minister of justice, minister of economy and trade, Jamal Amer, who was minister of foreign affairs, minister of agriculture, and the minister of public relations. The IDF confirmed killing al-Rahawi along with other senior military and political officials.

On 16 October, the Houthis announced the death of Muhammad al-Ghamari. Israeli defense minister Israel Katz said that he died of wounds sustained in the attacks, while the IDF said that he died on 28 August. Saba News Agency reported that his 13-year-old son and several companions were also killed. On 21 October, Yemeni media reported that Houthi Defense Minister Mohamed al-Atifi was reportedly in critical condition and rapidly declining, having been hospitalized since the 28 August airstrike. Israeli intelligence believed that he may have been among the casualties of the strike.

Rahawi and other victims of the strike were given a funeral at the Al-Shaab Mosque in Sanaa on 1 September. Al-Ghamari's funeral was held on 20 October.

== Aftermath ==
On 31 August 2025, Houthi security forces conducted raids on buildings belonging to United Nations agencies in Sanaa and Hodeidah, and arrested 11 workers. The workers belonged to various UN agencies including the World Food Programme, UNICEF and the World Health Organization. On 4 September, a Houthi official said the workers were being investigated as spies for Israel and the US, and would be put on trial if the accusations were confirmed. On 31 October, the Houthis announced that 43 UN staff held by the group would be tried over their alleged involvement in the attack.

== Reactions ==
Following the strikes, Israeli defense minister Israel Katz said: "As we warned the Houthis in Yemen: After the plague of darkness comes the plague of the firstborn," referencing the Biblical Plagues of Egypt. He added that: "Anyone who raises a hand against Israel – their hand will be severed."

A Houthi defense source initially denied that any senior leaders had been targeted and instead claimed that the attacks targeted Yemeni civilians due to "their positions supporting Gaza". The Houthis later described the attacks as "criminal and treacherous", and Supreme Political Council leader Mahdi al-Mashat vowed to avenge the killings, warning international companies to leave Israel. Houthi leader Abdul-Malik al-Houthi vowed to continue and to escalate the group's missile and drone attacks on Israel.

Iran's Islamic Revolutionary Guard Corps called the attack a war crime that sought to suppress Yemen's support for the Palestinians, and added that the attack "will ignite greater anger and expand the geography of resistance." Iranian president Masoud Pezeshkian urged an international response to Israel, while judiciary chief Gholam-Hossein Mohseni-Eje'i said the attacks displayed "Israel's failure to defeat Yemen militarily".

Hezbollah secretary-general Naim Qassem sent condolences to Abdul-Malik al-Houthi.

== See also ==
- Assassination of Qasem Soleimani
- Assassination of Ismail Haniyeh
- 2024 Hezbollah headquarters strike
- Assassination of Hashem Safieddine
- Killing of Yahya Sinwar
- 2025 Gaza European Hospital strikes
- Twelve-Day War
- Israeli attack on Doha
