= Bin Mubarak Cabinet =

- Cabinet of Yemen
- Date formed: 8 February 2024
- Date dissolved: 3 May 2025

People and organisations
- Head of state: Rashad al-Alimi
- Head of government: Ahmad Awad bin Mubarak

History
- Predecessor: Second Maeen Cabinet
- Successor: Salem Saleh bin Braik Cabinet

Bin Mubarak Cabinet was a cabinet of Yemen. Bin Mubarak was sworn on 8 February 2024, Thursday, before President Rashad Muhammad Al-Alimi, Chairman of the Presidential Leadership Council, at Ma’ashiq Palace in the temporary capital, Aden, on the occasion of his appointment as Prime Minister. The members of Bin Mubarak's government are essentially the same as the members of Maeen Abdulmalek's second government, which was formed on 18 December 2020, and thus it is considered an extension of it, as the change in it was limited to the appointment of the Minister of Foreign Affairs and Expatriates, Ahmed bin Mubarak, as Prime Minister on 5 February 2024 instead of Maeen Abdul Malik, in addition to his position as Minister of Foreign Affairs and Expatriates without any changes in other ministerial portfolios. On 26 March 2024, Bin Mubarak was replaced as Minister of Foreign Affairs and Expatriates by Shayea Al-Zindani. Bin Mubarak was replaced as prime minister by Salem Saleh bin Braik on 3 May 2025.
