= Amat Al-Salam Al-Hajj =

Yemeni human rights activist

Amat Al-Salam Abdullah Abdo Al-Hajj
- أمة السلام عبد الله عبده الحاج
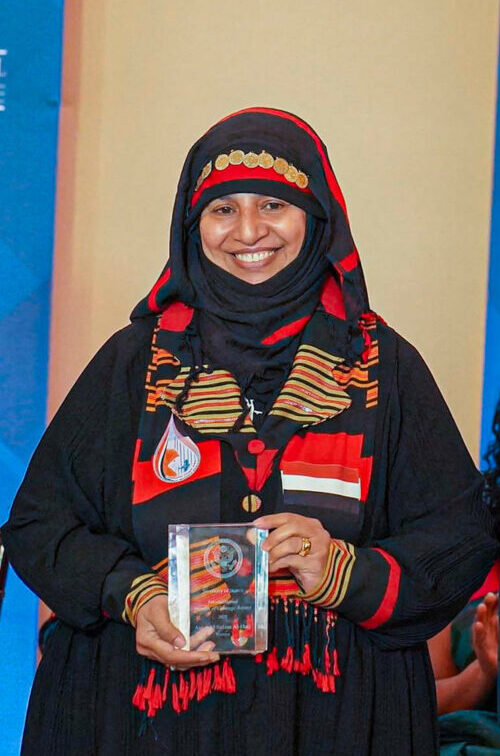
- Al-Hajj in 2025
- Born: Yemen Arab Republic
- Occupation: Human rights activist
- Awards: International Women of Courage Award

Amat Al-Salam Abdullah Abdo Al-Hajj is a Yemeni human rights activist and educator, known as the founder and president of the Mothers of Abductees Association (also called Abductees' Mothers Association). She has been recognised internationally for her work advocating for the rights of abductees, forcibly disappeared persons, and their families in Yemen, and was awarded the 2025 International Women of Courage Award by the U.S. Department of State.

== Biography ==
Amat Al-Salam Al-Hajj earned her master's degree in Islamic Studies from Yemen University. She serves as a professor at the Science and Technology University, and works as a supervisor in Yemen's Ministry of Education.

She also took part in Yemen's National Dialogue Conference, in the working group of independent institutions, where she has contributed her perspective, especially on issues of freedom of the media and civil society.

== Recognition and awards ==
In 2025, Amat Al-Salam Al-Hajj was one of the recipients of the U.S. International Women of Courage Award, in recognition of her activism on behalf of abductees and forcibly disappeared persons.

The U.S. State Department acknowledged her "powerful voice in drawing international attention to the plight of thousands of Yemeni detainees and their families."
