= Qassem Bahaibah =

Yemeni politician and minister of Health

Ministry of Public Health and Population
- Incumbent
- Assumed office 18 December 2020
- President: Abdrabbuh Mansur Hadi, Rashad al-Alimi
- Prime Minister: Shaya al-Zindani

Personal details
- Born: 1973 (age 52–53) Marib Governorate
- Party: Al-Islah

Qassem Mohammed Qassem Bahaibah (Arabic: قاسم محمد بحيبح, born 1973 in Marib) is a Yemeni politician who has been served as Ministry of Public Health and Population in the cabinet of Yemen since 18 December 2020.

== See also ==
- Cabinet of Yemen
- Politics of Yemen
