= Mohamed Qubaty =

Yemeni politician (born 1958)

His Excellency Dr. Mohamed Qubaty Grand Officer - National Order of the Cedar
- الدكتور محمد عبدالمجيد قباطي
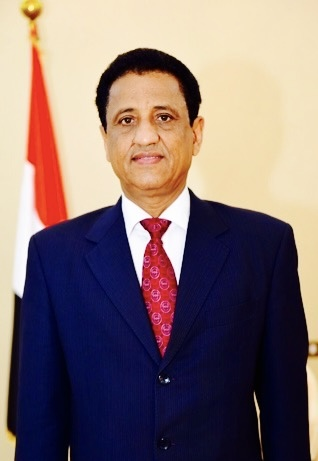

Minister of Tourism
- Incumbent
- Assumed office 18 September 2016

Minister of Information
- In office 1 December 2015 – 18 September 2016

Ambassador of Yemen to Lebanon and Cyprus
- In office 2003–2007
- Succeeded by: Faisal Amin Abu-Rass

Personal details
- Born: 5 January 1958 (age 68) Aden, Yemen
- Spouse: Faten Mohamed Kaid Saif (Political Advisor to the Yemeni Prime Minister)
- Children: Shady Qubaty; Alya Qubaty; Basem Qubaty
- Education: King's College London; King's College, Cambridge; University of London
- Awards: National Order of the Cedar
- Website: https://2009magd.blogspot.co.uk

Mohamed Abdulmageed Thabet Qubaty (Arabic: الدكتور محمد عبدالمجيد آل قباطي; born 5 January 1958) FRCS, GONOC is a Yemeni politician. As Yemen's Minister of Tourism, he was Chairman of the Yemen Tourism Promotion Board (YTPB), Vice President of the Arab Tourism Organization and Vice President of the UN World Tourism Organization Commission for the Middle East. He also served as Yemen's Minister of Information and Mass Media.

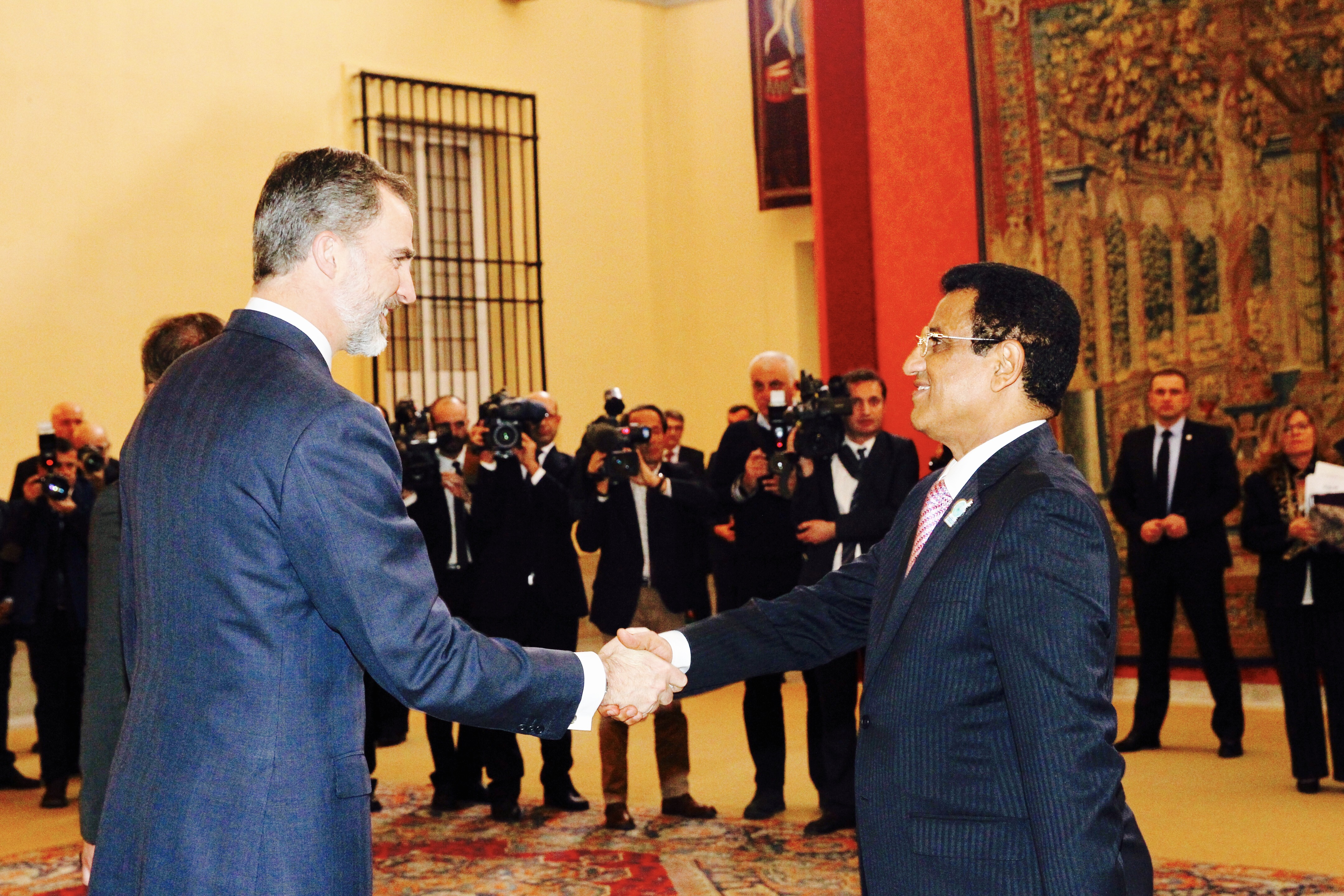
Qubaty greets H.M. King Felipe VI of Spain at the Zarzuela Palace, Madrid.

Known for "practicing politics with a scalpel" due to being one of the most successful surgeons in the country as well as an influential orator, he is one of Yemen's most famous political figureheads and led the opposition front during the Arab Spring. He is currently the Chairman of the Southern Civil Democratic Rally (MAGD-SCDR).

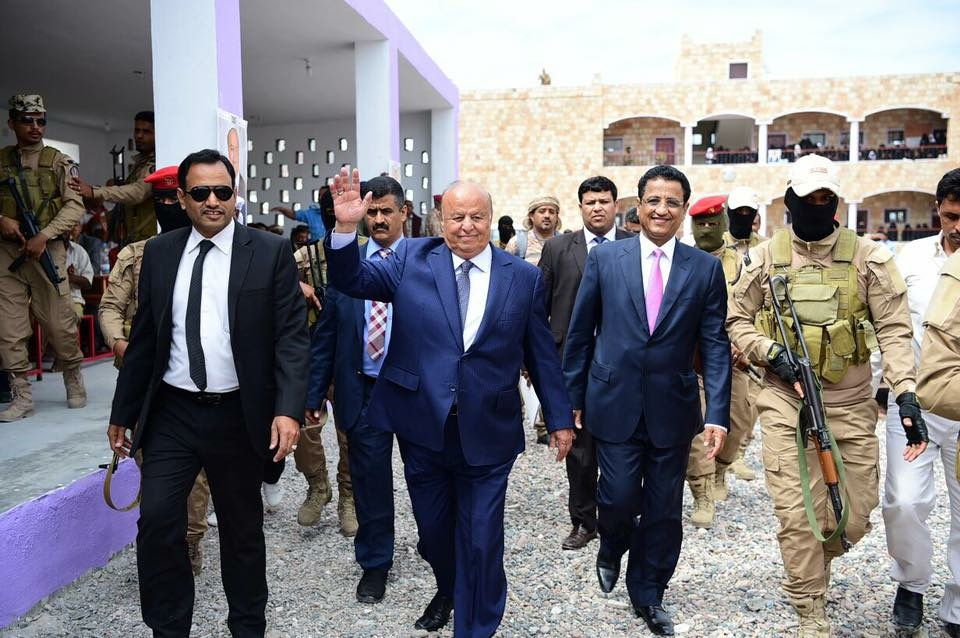
H.E. President Abdrabbuh Mansur Hadi and Qubaty launch the Socotra Open Skies and Development Initiative –Socotra, Yemen.

He has held previous political positions such as the Senior Political Advisor to four Yemeni Prime Ministers (2007–2011) and the Ambassador of Yemen to Lebanon and Cyprus (2003–2007).

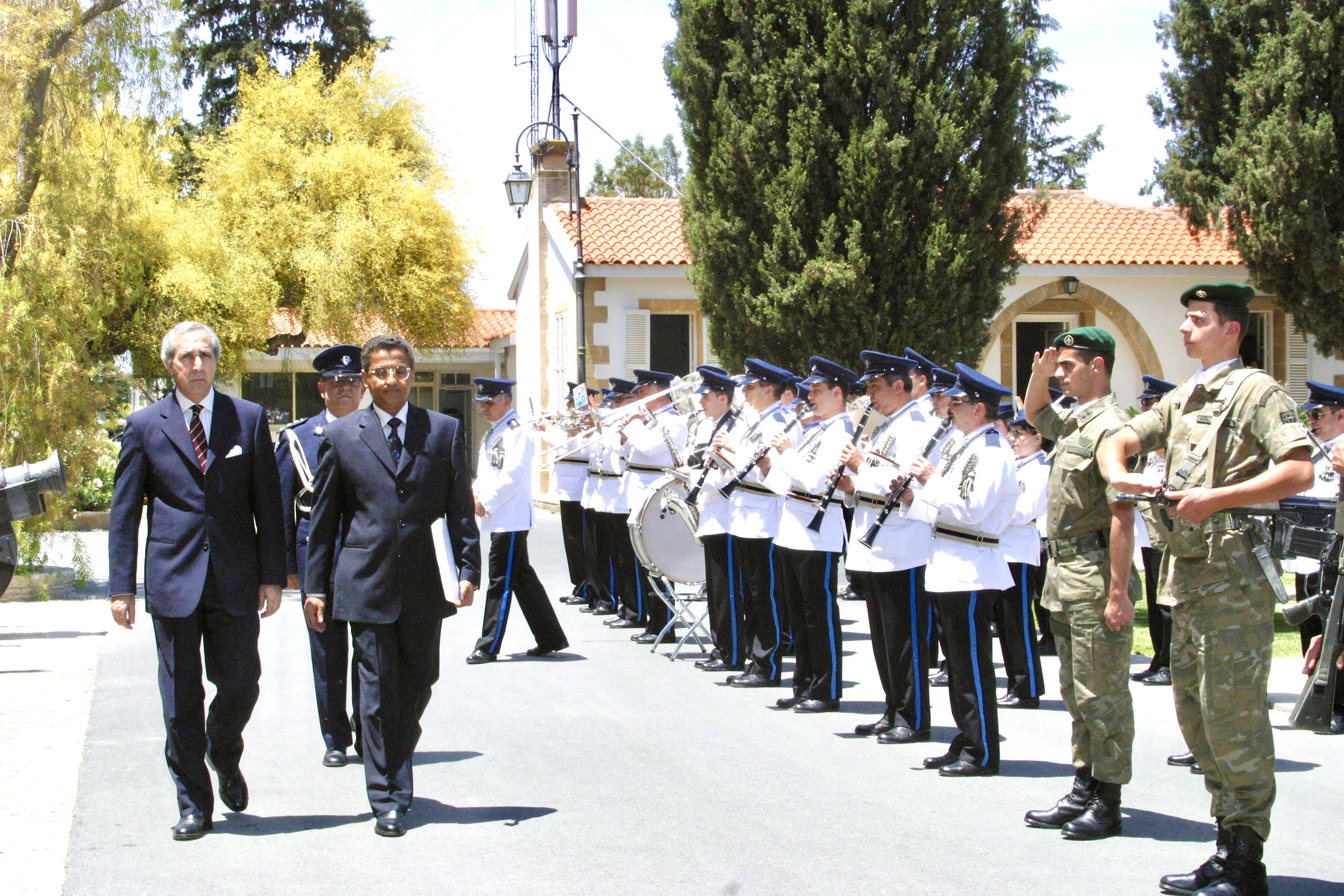
Qubaty presents his credentials to President Tassos Papadopoulos of Cyprus – Nicosia.

There was a failed attempt to assassinate him on 11 September 2012, which targeted the minister's motorcade, next to the Council of Ministers in Sana'a, Yemen under the guise of a terrorist attack marking the 11th anniversary of the September 11 attacks. Dr. Qubaty was injured and the suicide bombing led to the death of eight bodyguards whilst injuring others.

== Early life ==
He is married to Faten Mohamed Kaid Saif, Yemen's first female chartered accountant and the current political advisor to the Yemeni Prime Minister. She is the daughter of General Mohamed Kaid Saif (Vice President of Yemen, Deputy Commander-in-Chief and member of the Yemeni Revolutionary Command Council of 26 September 1962). They have three children: Shady, Alya and Basem.

== Ministerial career ==
At the 47th Session of the Council of Arab Ministers of Information, held jointly with Arab foreign ministers at the Arab League headquarters in Cairo on 25 May 2016, Professor Mohamed A. Qubaty, then serving as Yemen's Minister of Information and Mass Media, proposed a resolution to terminate Houthi control over Yemeni media channels and digital domains. The initiative was unanimously adopted by the Arab League, marking a turning point in regional media policy towards Yemen. During the same session, the Council declared Jerusalem (Al-Quds) as the Capital of Arab Media, reaffirming its cultural and political centrality.

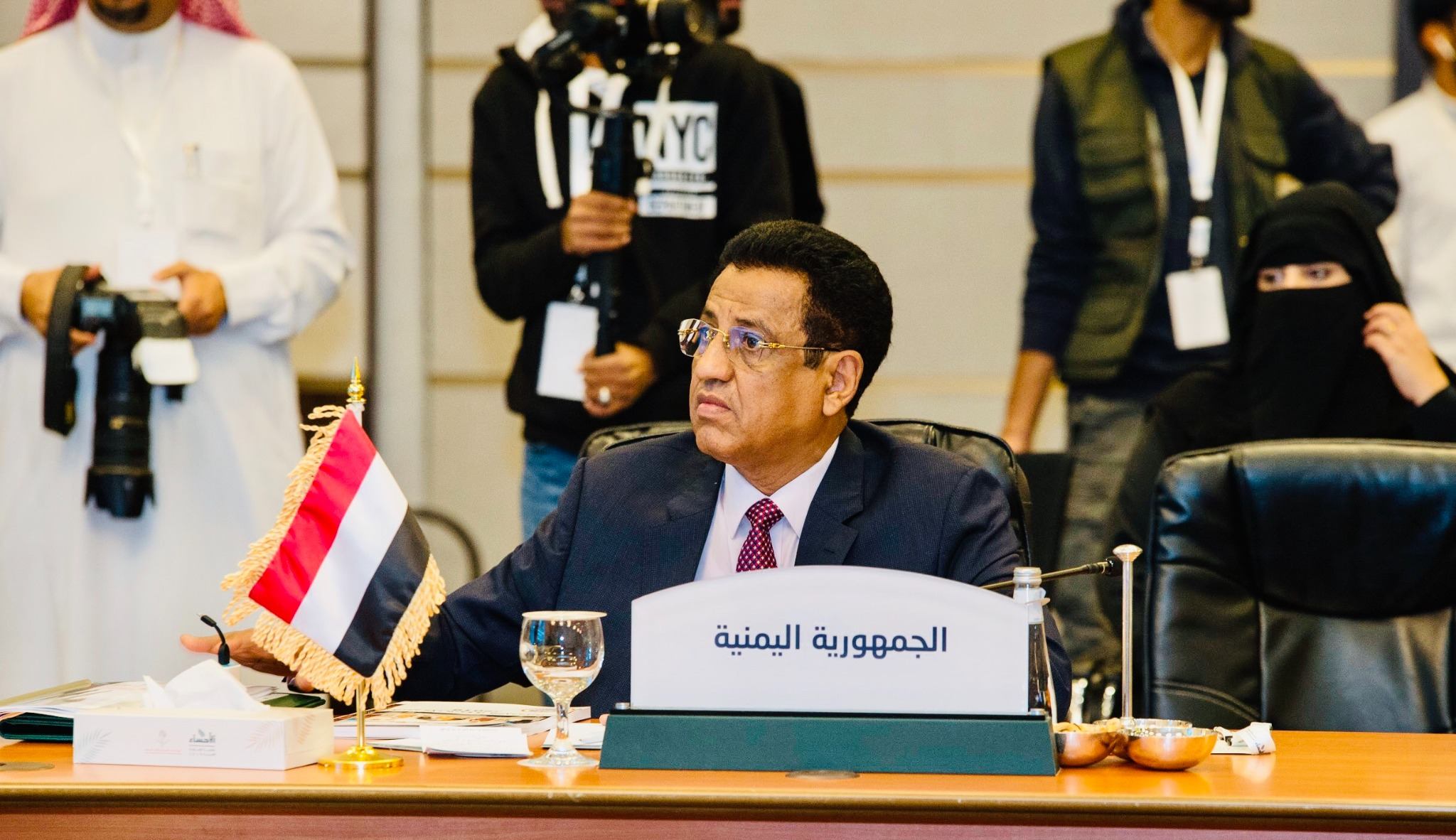
Qubaty representing Yemen at the Arab League’s joint summit of Information Ministers and Foreign Ministers – Cairo, 25 May 2016

On 7 February 2017, H.E. Professor Mohamed A. Qubaty, in his capacity as Yemen's Minister of Tourism, led the launch of the Socotra Open Skies and Development Initiative alongside H.E. President Abdrabbuh Mansur Hadi and the Governor of Socotra. This landmark project aimed to liberalize international air access to the Socotra Archipelago, promoting sustainable tourism, global engagement, and economic development. The initiative marked the first formal attempt to position Socotra—known for its unparalleled biodiversity and strategic location in the Arabian Sea—as a globally accessible destination. It also reinforced Yemen's sovereign presence on the island at a time of increasing geopolitical contestation in the region.

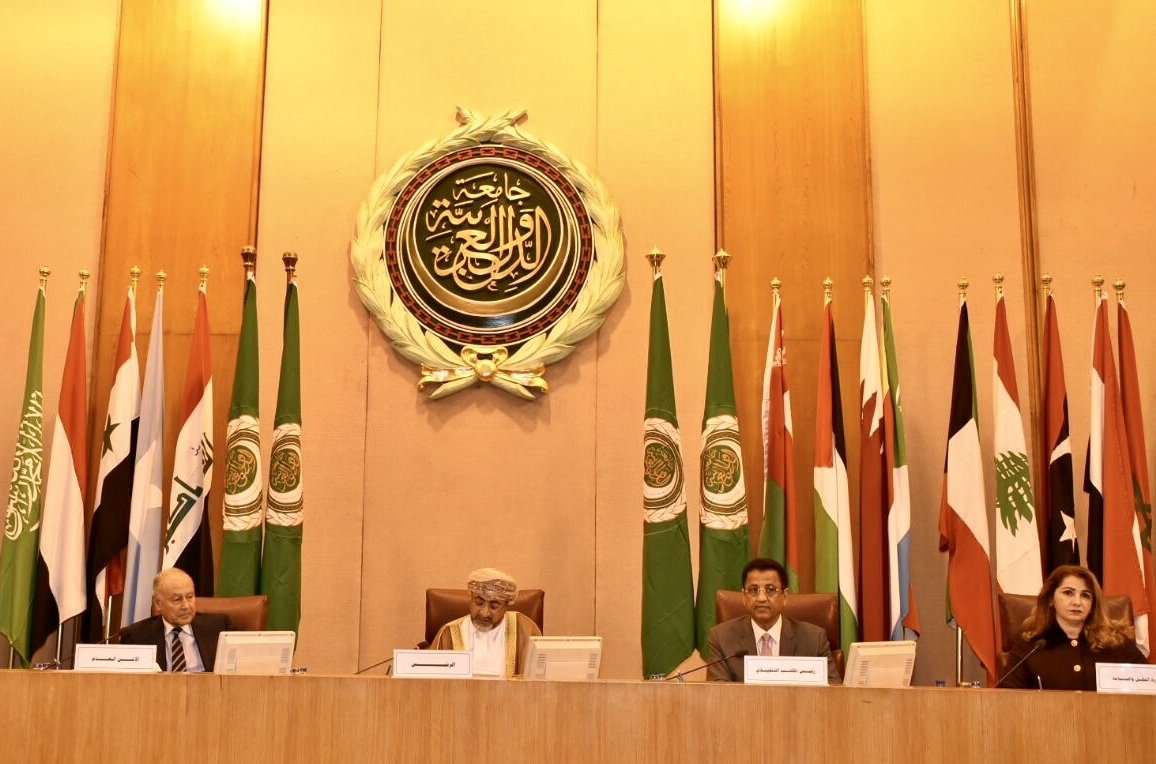
Qubaty presiding over the 20th Session of the Arab Ministerial Council for Tourism – Cairo, 6 December 2017, alongside Ahmed bin Nasser Al Mehrazi and Ahmed Aboul Gheit

== Education ==
- Primary and Secondary: Aden, Beirut and Cairo (GCE 'O' & 'A' Levels).
- Undergraduate Degree: MB, BS, King's College, University of London, 1980. LRCP, England, 1980.
- Postgraduate: MSc, King's College, Cambridge, 1984. MRCS, England, 1986. FRCS, Edinburgh, 1989. PhD, University of London, 1989.

== Medals and prizes ==
- The Lebanese National Cedar Medal, Grand Officer Order of the Grand Officer (GONOC), 2007. First and only Yemeni to have received the order.

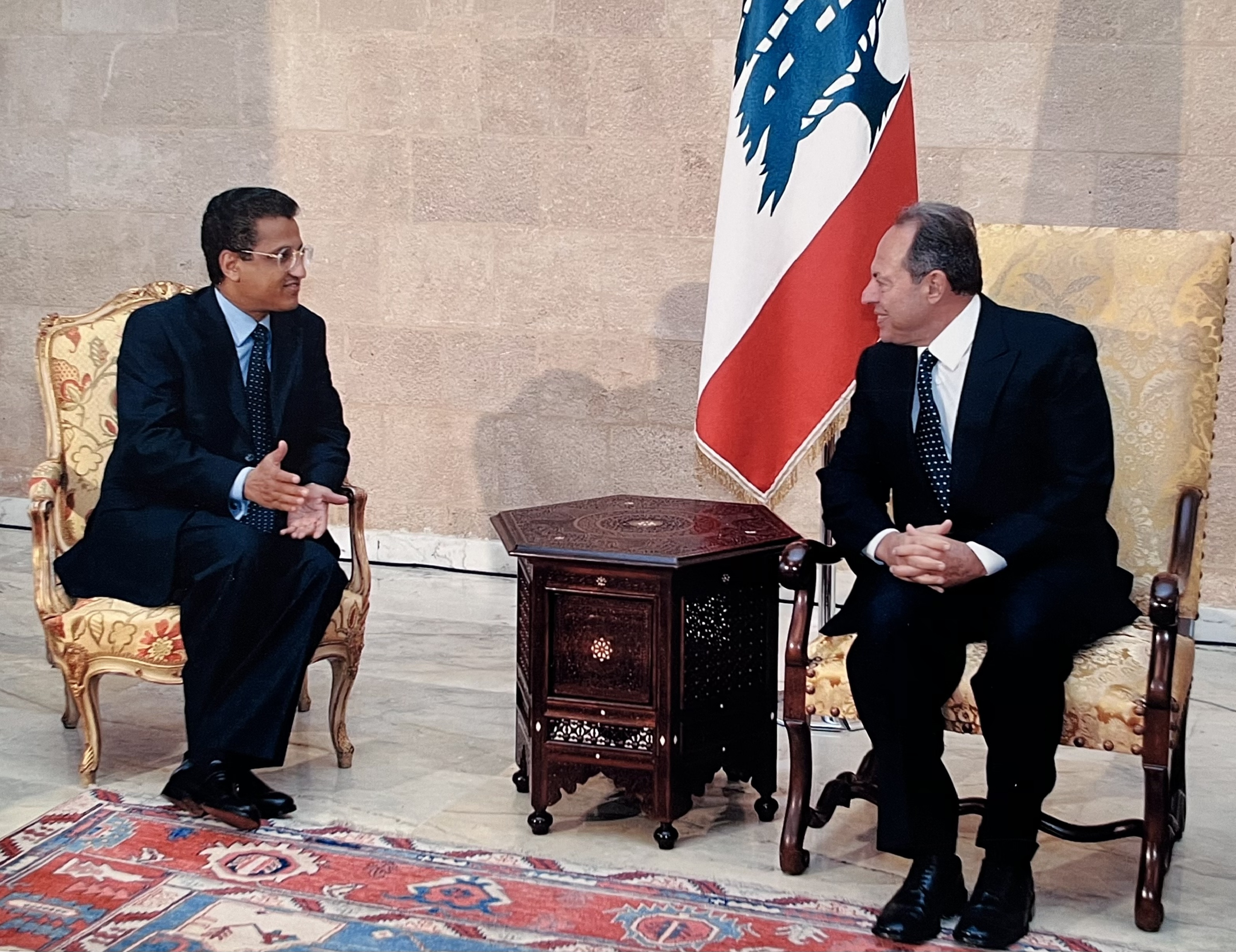
Awarding of the National Order of the Cedar – Grand Officer to Qubaty by President Émile Lahoud at the Baabda Palace in recognition of his role in strengthening Yemen–Lebanon ties and organizing the first official visit of Lebanese Prime Minister Rafik Hariri to Yemen.

- Shousha Internarional Prize, 2003. This is the 38th prize of its kind, since the first one in 1966 and the first time a Yemeni wins it.
- Yemen Times Person of the Year, 1998.
- Hael Saeed award, 1996.
- Aden University's Medal, 1995.
- Medal of Scientific Excellence, Aden, 1984.
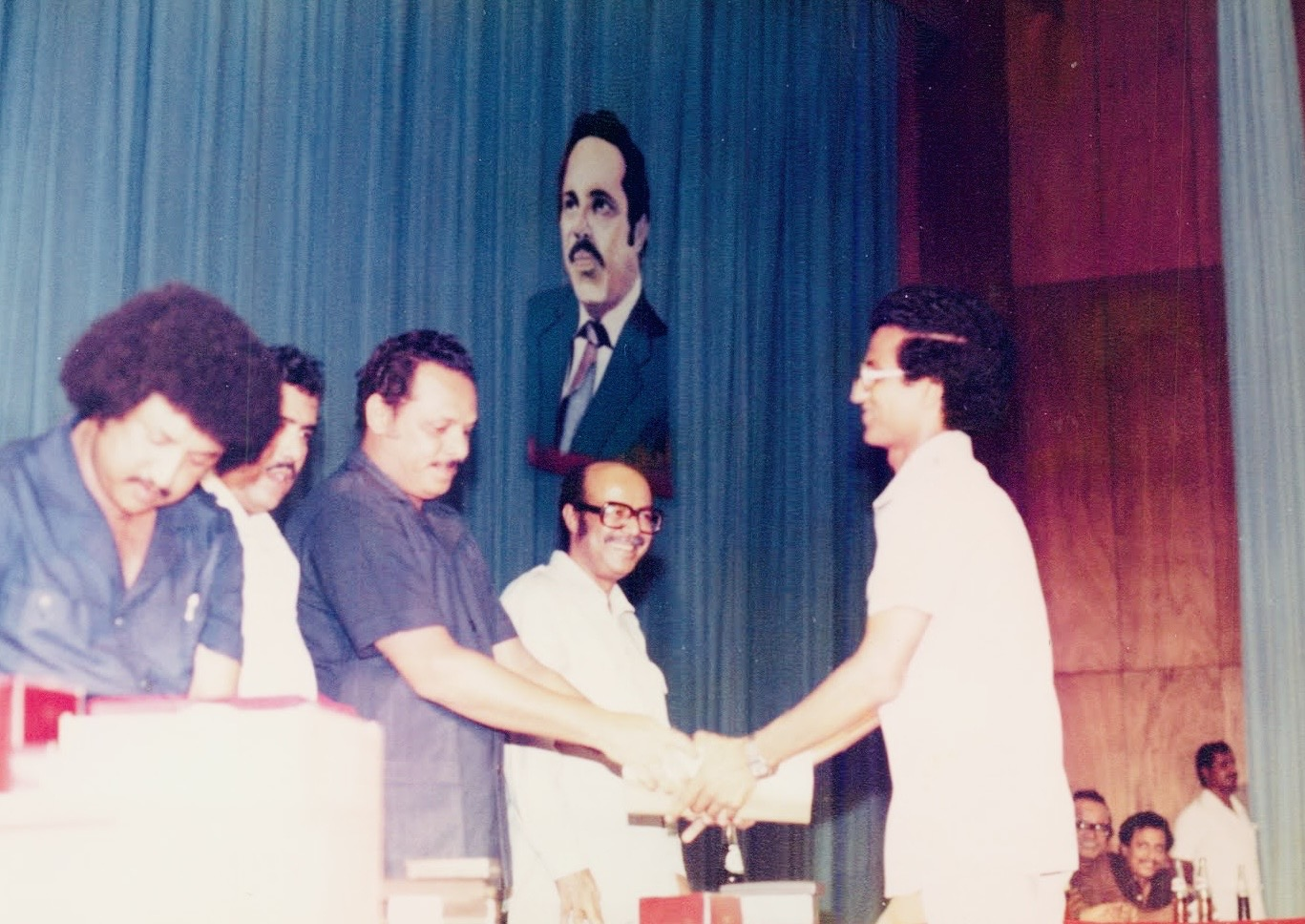
  Qubaty receiving the Medal of Scientific Excellence from President Ali Nasir Muhammad in Aden on 1 August 1984, following his graduation with distinction from King's College, Cambridge
- London University's Prize, 1980.

== Positions ==
- Yemen's Minister of Tourism and Chairman of the Yemen Tourism Promotion Board (YTPB).
- Vice President of the Arab Tourism Organization.
- Vice President of the UN World Tourism Organization Commission for the Middle East.
- Yemen's Minister of Information and Mass Media, 2015.
- Member of the National Dialogue Conference, 2013.
- Senior Political Advisor to the Prime Minister with the rank of Minister, 2008–2011.
- Chairman of the Foreign Relations and International Cooperation Department of the Ruling GPC Party, Yemen, 2009–2010.
- Member of the Supreme Media Committee of the Ruling (GPC), Party, 2009–2010.
- Founding Member, The Southern Civil Democratic Rally, (MAGD-SCDR), 2009.
- Ambassador Extraordinary and Plenipotentiary of Yemen to Lebanon and Cyprus 2003–2007.
- Political Advisor to the Prime Minister with the rank of Minister, 2001–2003.
- Vice Chairman of the Supreme Political Committee and Member of the Supreme Media Committee of the Ruling GPC Party, Yemen, 2001–2003.
- Member of the General Secretariat and Chairman of the Political and Foreign Relations Committee of the Ruling GPC Party, 2000–2003.
- Advisor to the Presidium of the Yemeni Parliament with the rank of Minister, 1996–2000.
- Established the National Program for Eradicating Leprosy, 1998.
- Member of the Permanent Committee and Secretary of the Supreme Political Committee and Member of the General Secretariat of the Ruling GPC Party, Yemen, 1996–2000.
- Advisor to the Services Committee of the Yemeni Parliament with the rank of Vice Minister, 1990–1996.
- Founding Member and External Affairs Secretary, the Yemeni British Friendship Association, 1992.
- Professor, University of Sana'a, 1991.
- Senior Lecturer, University of London, 1986–1990.
- Advisor to the Cabinet with the rank of Vice Minister, Aden, Yemen, 1983–1984.
- Secretary of the Yemeni Diplomats Forum, Aden, Yemen, 1983–1984.
- President of the UK Union of Arab Students, 1980–1982.
- Secretary of the Yemen Socialist Party Organizations in Western Europe, 1978–1985.
- General Secretary of the University of London Students' Union, 1977–1979.

== Poetry ==
In March 2014, he wrote Aden... An Icon of All Time.

Aden! a love harp wrestling the heathens,
A passion as blood waddling in entities.
How many epochs turned out repulsions,
Still a sunburst transcending adversities.

Northwards time keeps on evolving,
Anticipation how we shall withstand.
As the West carried on transforming,
You set up enlightenment a homeland.

Southwards Hirak crushes prostration,
Sculpts the dream into entity and creed.
Magnificence ready for any oblation,
Seeks the prerogative word and deed.

Wishes in East and West perfected,
Dispersing beauty shining as pearls.
In skies and seas paradises erected,
Amassing precedence in splendours.

Remnants of times well resurrected,
Glamour dazzling planets in colours.
Fragrance in horizons sophisticated,
History chapters echoing measures.

As a Phoenix in determination,
Aden shall rise,
From under the ashes,
Advocating peace,
A motherland not to cease,
Engraving pride for heavens to please.

As tall as a mountain,
Aden in gory and dignity,
Sprinkling as a fountain,
The homeland to eternity.

Inevitable and decisive,
The style of Aden and order,
A promise of love to live,
Yemen to prosper for ever.

== Publications ==
- Co-author of the book "Yemen and the World", Madbooli Publications, Cairo, 2001.
- Co-author of the book "Yemen and the Major International Powers", Information and Research Center of Sabaa, Sana'a, 2003.
- Main speaker at the Oxford University Symposium; the proceedings of which have been published in a book entitled "Citizenship and Democracy in the Arab Countries", Centre for Arab Unity studies, Beirut, 2001.
- Published and presented more than thirty scientific papers in medical conferences, symposia and journals in the UK, USA and the Arab World.
- Published and presented more than forty papers in the fields of political science, education, economics, modern and contemporary Yemeni history, covering areas related to democratisation, local government, party and parliamentary institutions, educational reform, the impact of IT, privatisation, Yemeni–European and Yemeni–American relations, etc.
