= Bayt Baws =

Bayt Baws بيت بوس
- Village
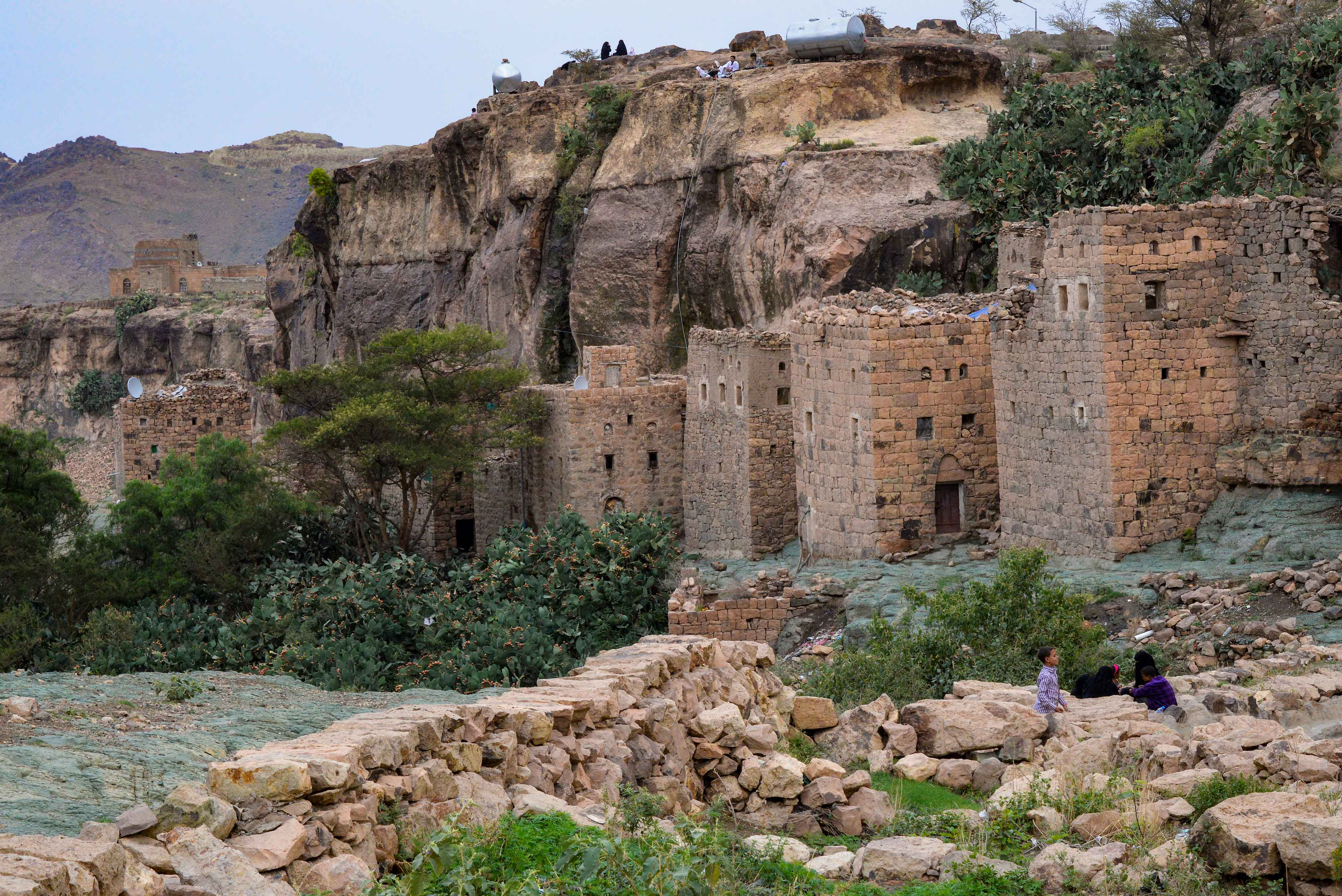

- Location in Yemen
- Coordinates: 15.2731°N 44.20356°E
- Country: Yemen
- Governorate: Sanaa
- District: Bani Matar
- Elevation: 7,680 ft (2,341 m)
- Time zone: UTC+3 (Yemen Standard Time)

Bayt Baws (Arabic: بيت بوس Bayt Baws) is a historic village and fortress in Bani Matar District of Sanaa Governorate, Yemen. It is a largely deserted Jewish settlement. It is located to the south of Sanaa, in a strategic position on the western side of the Sanaa plain. It served as a locally important stronghold throughout the middle ages and was especially used as a staging point for campaigns against Sanaa. Its period of greatest significance was during the campaigns of Al-Hadi ila'l-Haqq Yahya, the first Imam of Yemen. According to tradition, Bayt Baws is named after a person named Dhū Baws, whose genealogy is given either as Dhū Baws b. ‘Abd al-Rahmān b. Zayd b. ‘Abd Il b. Sharḥabīl b. Marāthid b. Dhī Saḥar or as Dhū Baws b. Barīl b. Sharaḥbīl, of the tribe of Himyar.
