= Ministry of Expatriates Affairs =

Government ministry of Yemen

Ministry of Expatriates Affairs (Arabic: وزارة شؤون المغتربين ) is a cabinet ministry of Yemen.

== List of ministers ==
- Afrah al-Zouba (23 July 2026 – present)
- Shaya al-Zindani (27 March 2024 – 23 July 2026)
- Ahmed Awadh bin Mubarak (18 December 2020 – 27 March 2024)
- Alawi Ba Fakih (9 November 2014)

== See also ==
- Politics of Yemen
