= Nabil Hasan al-Faqih =

Yemeni politician (born 1968)

Nabil Hasan al-Faqih (Arabic: نبيل حسن الفقيه, born 1968) is a Yemeni politician. He quit his position as minister of tourism over the 2011 Yemeni uprising, a role in which he had had to deal with constant attacks from al-Qaeda. He served as Civil Service and Insurance minister from 2018 to 2020.
