= Jamal Amer =

Yemeni journalist (1968–2025)

- جمال عامر

Minister of Foreign Affairs and Emigrants
- Disputed
- In office 10 August 2024 – 28 August 2025
- President: Mahdi al-Mashat
- Prime Minister: Ahmed al-Rahawi
- Preceded by: Hisham Sharaf
- Succeeded by: Abdel Wahed Abu Rass (as deputy foreign minister)

Personal details
- Born: 23 July 1968 Ibb Governorate, North Yemen
- Died: 28 August 2025 (aged 57) Sanaa, Yemen
- Cause of death: Assassination by airstrike
- Party: Nasserist Unionist People's Organisation (1990's); Houthis (c. 2004–2025)

Jamal Amer (Arabic: جمال عامر, romanized: Jamāl ʻĀmir; 23 July 1968 – 28 August 2025) was a Yemeni journalist, editor and politician who served as the minister of foreign affairs in the Houthi-backed Supreme Political Council from August 2024 until his death in August 2025. Prior to then, he was the editor of the weekly journal Al-Wasat, which he founded in 2004. Al-Wasat frequently publishes reports critical of the government from international human rights organizations.

== Background ==
Jamal Amer was born on 23 July 1968 in Ibb Governorate. He attended Sanaa University, and graduated as a Bachelor in Education in the 1990s. Prior to 2004, Amer worked as a journalist for the weekly Al-Wahdawi. His reporting resulted in convictions for "harming the public interest", "offending King Fahd of Saudi Arabia", and "damaging relations between Saudi Arabia and Yemen". In 2000, he was banned by a court from working as a journalist for having "insulted Saudi Arabia".

== Abduction ==
In 2005, Al-Wasat carried a series of articles criticizing government corruption, including an article on government officials who had sent children to allied countries to study despite a prohibition from President Ali Abdallah Saleh forbidding the arrangement. On 25 August, Amer was abducted outside his home in Sana'a by four men in a vehicle with military license plates. They blindfolded him, drove him into the mountains, beat him, threatened to kill him, and ordered him to stop writing about government officials before releasing him. Though Amer filed a complaint, authorities reportedly took no action on the case.

Along with burglaries at the offices of the Associated Press and another newspaper, the incident led to the founding of "a coalition of civil society advocacy of rights and freedoms" led by Yemeni journalists to advocate for their protection and rights. Internationally, the incident was condemned by the Austria-based International Press Institute, which called it "a disturbing picture of the varied methods being used to silence critical voices in the Yemeni press", and by the France-based Reporters Without Borders, which called it "a reminder that it is still very difficult to work as an independent journalist in this country". Amnesty International also issued a statement of concern. The following year, the US-based Committee to Protect Journalists awarded Amer its International Press Freedom Award, which recognizes journalists who show courage in defending press freedom despite facing attacks, threats, or imprisonment.

== Later work ==
Amer continued to edit Al-Wasat. In 2008, the Information Ministry attempted to revoke the paper's license, stating that Al-Wasat "undermined national unity, stirred up religious divisions and damaged relations with neighbouring countries". A court overturned the order, allowing the paper to continue publication.

In 2010, his reporter Anisa Mohammed Ali Othman was sentenced in absentia to a year's imprisonment on a charge of insulting the president after she wrote two articles about political corruption. Amer was fined 10,000 riyals (US$50). He described Othman's prison sentence as "cruel and illegal".

== Political career ==
After the Houthi takeover in Yemen, Amer had been tasked to manage the Houthi movement's relations with Arab, Muslim and European countries. On 12 August 2024, he was officially appointed the Minister of Foreign Affairs of the Houthi-led Supreme Political Council. Due to being one of Abdul Malik al-Houthi's closest allies, the Houthis decided to dissolve the Supreme Council for the Management and Coordination of Humanitarian Affairs and International Cooperation (SCMCHA) in November 2024 due to internal corruption and frustration from international donors, and transfer its responsibilities to the Foreign Affairs ministry.

Amid the start of an intensified bombing campaign against the Houthis by the United States in March 2025, Amer conducted an interview with Reuters in which he accused the US of escalating the conflict to a full-blown war with Yemen. Amer stated that the Houthis would not be deterred from continuing attacks on Israel-bound commercial vessels, and denied that their decision-making was influenced by Iran. He asserted that Yemen had the right to defend itself against the US attacks, and voiced appreciation for Saudi Arabia as they had not joined in on the campaign. In April, Amer sent a letter to the presidents of the United Nations General Assembly and Security Council protesting the US strikes as a violation of international law and the UN Charter.

== Death ==
On 28 August 2025, Ahmed al-Rahawi and several companions, including Amer, were killed in an Israeli airstrike on an apartment building in Sanaa, Yemen. His death was confirmed on 30 August by the Houthis. He and other victims of the strike were given a funeral at the Al-Shaab Mosque in Sanaa on 1 September.
