= Murshed Al-Arashani =

Yemeni judge and politician

Murshed Al-Arashani (born 1952- ) is a Yemeni judge and politician. He served as Minister of Justice in Yemen. In 2012, he received anonymous death threats.

Judge Al-Arashani used to be a member of the Higher Judiciary Council, and a member of the Higher Court Head of Islah Social Charity Association.
