= Military ranks of Yemen =

The Military ranks of Yemen are the military insignia used by the Republic of Yemen Armed Forces.

== Commissioned officer ranks ==
The rank insignia for commissioned officers.

In the navy officer ranks are indicated on the epaulette in gold insignia on a black base colour. A mulazim than (acting sub-lieutenant) wears a single five-pointed star, additional gold stars are worn with each ascending rank until the rank of ta'id (lieutenant commander) who wears the Emblem of Yemen (the Eagle of Saladin with national flags). Further rank increments are indicated by additional stars, until the highest rank of smid (commodore) which is distinguished from that of sqid (captain) by the additional of a laurel wreath around the stars.

Rank group	General / flag officers					Senior officers			Junior officers
Yemeni Land Forces
Yemeni Land Forces	مشیر; Mushir	فريق أول; Fariq 'awal	فريق; Fariq	لواء; Liwa	عميد; Amid	عقيد; Aqid	مقدم; Muqaddam	رائد; Ra'id	نقيب; Naqib	ملازم أول; Mulazim awwal	ملازم ثان; Mulazim than
Yemeni Navy
Yemeni Navy					عميد; Amid	عقيد; Aqid	مقدم; Muqaddam	رائد; Ra'id	نقيب; Naqib	ملازم أول; Mulazim awwal	ملازم ثان; Mulazim than
Yemeni Air Force
Yemeni Air Force	مشیر; Mushir	فريق أول; Fariq 'awal	فريق; Fariq	لواء; Liwa	عميد; Amid	عقيد; Aqid	مقدم; Muqaddam	رائد; Ra'id	نقيب; Naqib	ملازم أول; Mulazim awwal	ملازم ثان; Mulazim than
Rank group	General / flag officers					Senior officers			Junior officers

== Other ranks ==
The rank insignia for non-commissioned officers and enlisted personnel.

Rank group	Senior NCOs					Junior NCOs		Enlisted
Yemeni Land Forces
Yemeni Land Forces	مساعد أول; Musaeid 'awal	مساعد ثان; Musaeid than	مساعد; Musaeid	رقيب أول; Raqib 'awal	رقيب; Raqib	عريف; Earif		جندي; Jundiun
Yemeni Navy
Yemeni Navy	Warrant officer			Petty officer first class	Petty officer second class	Petty officer third class	Seaman
Yemeni Air Force								No insignia
Yemeni Air Force	Warrant officer			Flight sergeant	Sergeant	Senior Airman	Airman First Class	Airman جندي
Rank group	Senior NCOs					Junior NCOs		Enlisted
