= Nihal Ali Al-Awlaqi =

Yemeni lawyer (born 1977)

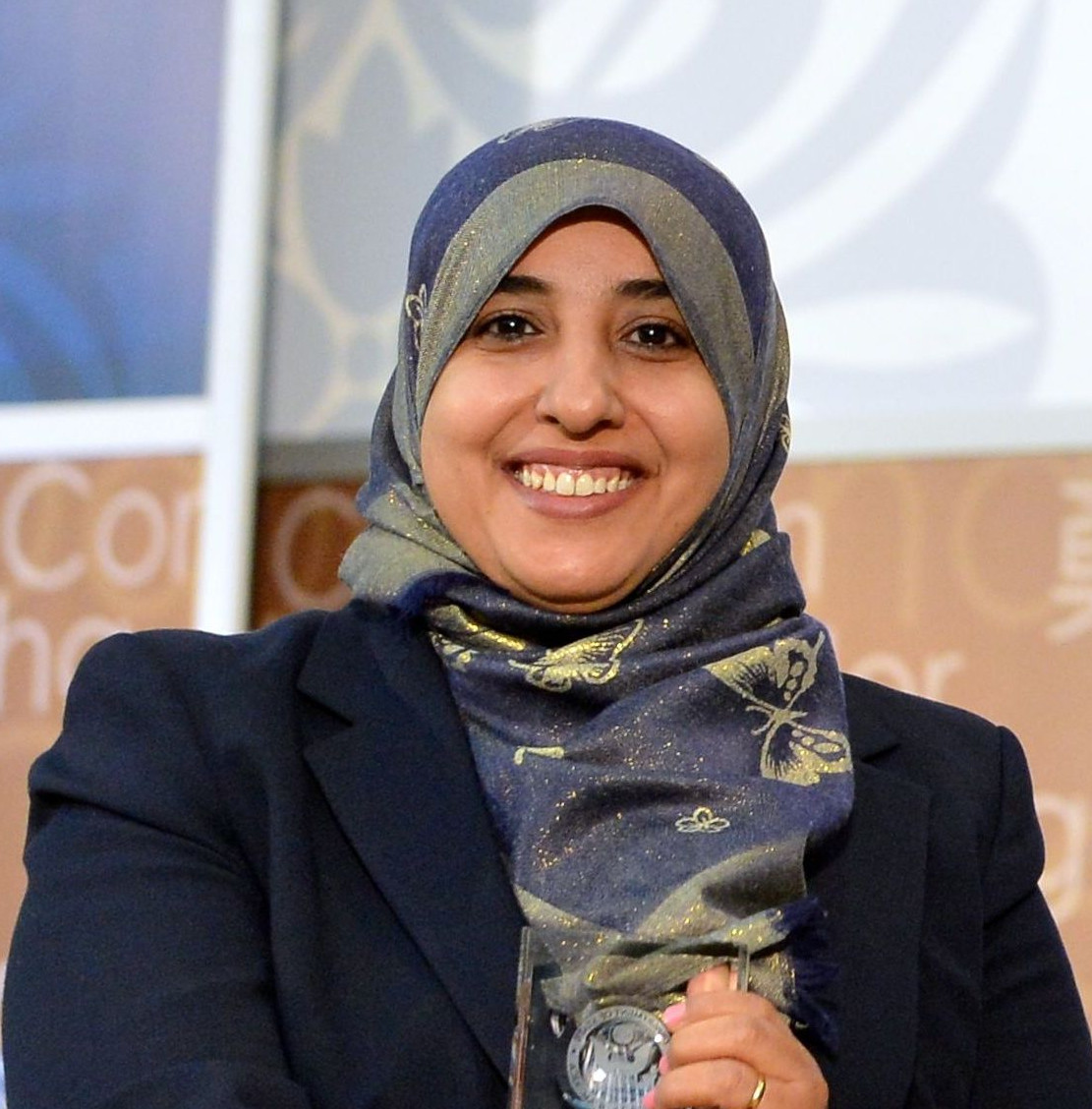
- Al-Awlaqi in 2016

Minister of Legal Affairs
- In office 9 January 2016 – 17 December 2020
- President: Abdrabbuh Mansour Hadi
- Prime Minister: Ahmed Obaid Bin Dagher; Maeen Abdulmalik Saeed
- Succeeded by: Ahmed Mohamed Omar Orman

Personal details
- Born: 1977 (age 48–49)
- Education: Mohammed V University

Nihal Naj Ali Al-Awlaqi (alternative spellings: Nihal Naji Ali Al Awlaki, Nehal Al-Awlaqi) (Arabic: نهال ناجي علي العولقي; born 1977) is a Yemeni lawyer. She was the Yemeni Minister of Legal Affairs from 9 January 2016 to 17 December 2020. In 2016 she received the International Women of Courage Award.

== Life ==
Al-Awlaqi is from the Shabwah Governorate in Yemen. She received a Bachelor of Legal Sciences, Master of Law and Doctor of Laws degrees from Mohammed V University in Morocco. She speaks Arabic, English, and French.

Al-Awlaqi became an assistant law professor at the University of Aden, where she worked on research and training on the status of women. In 2013–14, she was a member of the State-Building Working Group of the National Dialogue Conference. In March 2014, she was appointed a member of the constitution drafting committee (CDC), and was subsequently elected deputy chair of the CDC. She was a member of the government negotiating team in Geneva.

In January 2016, she was announced as Minister of Legal Affairs. On September 9, 2016, Yemen President Abd Rabbo Mansour Hadi officially appointed al-Awlaqi, then 39 years old, as Minister of Legal Affairs ( وزيراً للشؤون القانونية ). She retained this role until 17 December 2020.
