= Ministry of Human Rights (Yemen) =

Government ministry of Yemen

- Emblem of Yemen

Ministry overview
- Formed: 1963
- Jurisdiction: Government of Yemen
- Headquarters: Aden, Sana'a
- Ministry executive: Mashdal Mohammed Omar Ahmed, Minister of Human Rights

Ministry of Human Rights (Arabic: وزارة حقوق الإنسان ) is a cabinet ministry of Yemen.

== List of ministers ==
- Mashdal Mohammed Omar Ahmed (18 December 2020 – present)
- Azzadin al-Asbahi (7 November 2014 – 2020)
- Hooria Mashhour (2012–2014)
- Huda al-Baan (April 2007–20 March 2011)
- Amat Al Alim Alsoswa (May 2003–2006)
- Wahiba Faraʽa (4 April 2001–16 May 2003)

== See also ==
- Cabinet of Yemen
- Politics of Yemen
