= Ministry of Culture (Yemen) =

Government ministry of Yemen

The Ministry of Culture (Arabic: وزارة الثقافة) is a cabinet ministry of Yemen.

== List of ministers ==
- Muti'a Ahmed Qasim Dammaj (6 February 2026 – present)
- Muammar Al-Iryani (18 December 2020 – 6 February 2026)
- Marwan Damaj ( 18 September 2016 – December 2020)
- Arwa Othman ( 7 November 2014 – 22 January 2015)
- Abdullah Al-Kibsi

== See also ==
- Cabinet of Yemen
- Politics of Yemen
