= Ministry of Legal Affairs (Yemen) =

Government ministry of Yemen

Ministry of Legal Affairs (Arabic: وزارة الشؤون القانونية) is a cabinet ministry of Yemen.

== List of ministers ==
- Judge Ishraq Fadl Al-Maqtari (6 February 2026 – present)
- Mashdal Mohammed Omar Ahmed (18 December 2020 – 6 February 2026)
- Nihal Ali Al-Awlaqi (9 January 2016 – 17 December 2020)
- Mohamed al-Mekhlafi (2011–2014)
- Rashad al-Rasas (2007–2011)
- Adnan al-Jafri (2006)

== See also ==
- Cabinet of Yemen
- Politics of Yemen
