= Ministry of Planning and International Cooperation (Yemen) =

Government ministry of Yemen

Ministry of Planning and International Cooperation (Arabic: وزارة التخطيط والتعاون الدولي ) is a cabinet ministry of Yemen.

== List of ministers ==
- Mohammed Abdullah Ahmed Al-Faqmi (25 August 2026 – present)
- Badr Mohammed Mubarak Basalmah (23 July 2026 – 25 August 2026)
- Afrah al-Zouba (6 February 2026 – 23 July 2026)
- Waed Abdullah Badhib (18 December 2020 – 6 February 2026)
- Mohamed al-Maytami (2014 – 18 December 2020)

== See also ==
- Cabinet of Yemen
- Politics of Yemen
