= Ministry of Endowments and Guidance =

Government ministry of Yemen

- Emblem of Yemen

Ministry overview
- Formed: 1990
- Jurisdiction: Government of Yemen
- Headquarters: Aden, Sana'a
- Minister responsible: Sheikh Turki Abdullah Ali Al-Wadei, Minister of Endowments and Guidance

The Ministry of Endowments and Guidance (Arabic: وزارة الأوقاف والإرشاد) is a cabinet ministry of Yemen.

== List of ministers ==
- Sheikh Turki Abdullah Ali Al-Wadei (6 February 2026 – present)
- Mohamed Ahmed Shabiba (18 December 2020 – 6 February 2026)
- Ahmed Zabin Atayah (18 September 2016 – 17 December 2020)

== See also ==
- Cabinet of Yemen
- Politics of Yemen
