= Ministry of Justice (Yemen) =

Government ministry of Yemen

Republic of Yemen Ministry of Justice
- Emblem of Yemen

Ministry overview
- Formed: 1963
- Jurisdiction: Government of Yemen
- Headquarters: Aden
- Ministry executive: Badr Abdo Ahmed Al-Aradha, Minister of Justice
- Website: gov.moj-ye.com

The Ministry of Justice (Arabic: وزارة العدل) is a cabinet ministry of Yemen.

== Introduction ==
Established in 1963, the Ministry of Justice of Yemen seeks to develop an independent judiciary by overseeing operations such as fiscal and administrative services. Additionally, the ministry is responsible for tasks such as the following:

- Drafting laws that not only affect the judicial system but also the ministry as a whole
- Facilitating a professional relationship amongst the judiciary, authorities, and legal practitioners
- Representing Yemen in regional and international seminars that pertain to the judiciary and law-related matters

Although the names sound similar, the Ministry of Justice differs from the Ministry of Legal Affairs in that the latter focuses on human rights and civic freedom for Yemeni citizens.

== List of ministers ==
- Abdul Rahman al-Iryani (1962–1963)
- Mohammed Ali Al-Akwaa (1963–1964)
- Mohamed Ismail El Hadji (1964–1965)
- Mohammed bin Mohammed Al-Mansour (1966–1967)
- Mohamed Ismail El Hadji (1967–1969)
- Ali bin Ali al-Samman (1969–1970)
- Hussein Ali Marfaq (1970–1971)
- Ali bin Ali al-Samman (1972–1973)
- Mohamed Ismail El Hadji (1973–1974)
- Ali bin Ali al-Samman (1974–1978)
- Ismail Ahmed Al Wazir (1978–1980)
- Mohsen Mohammed Al-Olafi (1980–1983)
- Ahmed Mohamed El-Gobi (1983–1988)
- Mohsen Mohammed Al-Olafi (1988–1990)
- Abdul Wassa Ahmed Salam (1990–1993)
- Abdulla Ahmed Ghanem (1993–1994)
- Abdul Wahab Lutf Aldilmi (1994–1997)
- Ismail Ahmed Al Wazir (1997–2001)
- Ahmed Abdullah Akabat (2001–2003)
- Adnan Omar Al-Jafri (2003–2006)
- Ghazi Shaaf al-Aghbari (2006–2011)
- Murshid Ali Al-Arshani (2011–2014)
- Khaled Omar Bajunaid (2014–2016)
- Nahal al-Awlaqi (2016–2017)
- Jamal Mohammed Omar (2017–17 December 2020)
- Badr al-Ardah (17 December 2020–6 February 2026)
- Judge Badr Abdo Ahmed Al-Aradha (6 February 2026–present)
- Ahmed Abdullah Akabat (2016–2021 under Houthi cabinet)
- Nabil Al-Azzani (since 2021 under Houthi cabinet)

== See also ==
- Cabinet of Yemen
- Politics of Yemen
- Justice ministry
