= Ministry of Education (Yemen) =

Government ministry of Yemen

Ministry of Education (Arabic: وزارة التربية والتعليم) is a cabinet ministry of Yemen.

== List of ministers ==
=== Yemeni government in Aden ===
- Adel Abdulmajid Alawi Al-Abbadi (6 February 2026 – present)
- Tareq Salem al-Abkari (18 December 2020 – 6 February 2026)
- Abdulatef Hussein al-Hakimi (2014)

=== Houthi government in Sana'a ===
- Yahia al-Houthi (2016–present)

== See also ==
- Cabinet of Yemen
- Politics of Yemen
