= Ministry of Higher Education and Scientific Research (Yemen) =

Government ministry of Yemen

Republic of Yemen Ministry of Higher Education and Scientific Research
- وزارة التعليم العالي والبحث العلمي
- وزارة التعليم العالي والبحث العلمي

Agency overview
- Agency executive: Ameen Noman Mohammed Al-Qadsi, Minister of Higher Education and Scientific Research
- Website: Official website

The Ministry of Higher Education and Scientific Research (Arabic: وزارة التعليم العالي والبحث العلمي) is a cabinet ministry of Yemen.

== List of ministers ==
- Ameen Noman Mohammed Al-Qadsi (6 February 2026 – present)
- Khaled Al-Wasabi (18 December 2020 – 6 February 2026)
- Mohamed al-Mutaher (2014–2015)
- Hesham Sharf (2011 -)

== See also ==
- Cabinet of Yemen
- Politics of Yemen
