= Ministry of Local Administration =

Government ministry of Yemen

The Ministry of Local Administration (Arabic: وزارة الإدارة المحلية) is a cabinet ministry of Yemen. The Ministry of Local Administration was established in 1990.

== List of ministers ==
- Ahmed Saleh Ahmed al-Awlaki (2 November 2026 – present)
- Ahd Mohammed Salem Jaasous (23 July 2026 – 2 November 2026)
- Badr Mohammed Mubarak Basalmah (6 February 2026 – 23 July 2026)
- Hussein Abdul Rahman Abdul Qader Al-Aghbari (18 December 2020 – 6 February 2026)

== See also ==
- Cabinet of Yemen
- Politics of Yemen
