= Ministry of Telecommunications and Information Technology (Yemen) =

Government ministry of Yemen

Ministry of Telecommunications & Information Technology (Arabic: وزارة الإتصالات وتقنية المعلومات ) is a cabinet ministry of Yemen.

== List of ministers ==
- Dr. Shadi Saleh Basurra (6 February 2026 - present)
- Waed Abdullah Badhib (12 December 2023 – 6 February 2026)
- Najib al-Awj (18 December 2020 – 12 December 2023)
- Lutfi Bashuraif (2014 – 18 December 2020)

== See also ==
- Cabinet of Yemen
- Politics of Yemen
