= Ministry of Transport (Yemen) =

Government ministry of Yemen

The Ministry of Transport (Arabic: وزارة النقل) is a cabinet ministry of Yemen.

== List of ministers ==
- Mohsen Ali Haidarah Qasim Al-Omari (6 February 2026 – present)
- Abdulsalam Saleh Humaid (18 December 2020 – 6 February 2026)
- Saleh al-Jabwani (2017–2020)
- Murad Ali Mohamed (2015–2017)
- Badr Baslmah (2014–2015)
- Waid Badhib (2011–2014)
- Khaled Ibrahim al-Wazir (2007–2011)

== See also ==
- Cabinet of Yemen
- Politics of Yemen
