= Ministry of Public Works and Highways =

Government ministry of Yemen

Ministry of Public Works and Highways (Arabic: وزارة الأشغال العامة والطرق) is a government ministry of Yemen.

== List of ministers ==
- Hussein Awad Saeed Al-Aqrabi (6 February 2026 – present)
- Salem Mohamed al-Harayzi (28 July 2022 – 6 February 2026)
- Manea Ben Yamain (18 December 2020 – 28 July 2022)

== See also ==
- Cabinet of Yemen
- Politics of Yemen
