= Ministry of Civil Service and Insurance =

Government ministry of Yemen

Ministry of Civil Service and Insurance (Arabic: وزارة الخدمة المدنية والتأمينات ) is a cabinet ministry of Yemen.

== List of ministers ==
- Akram Naseeb Ahmed al-Amiri (2 November 2026–present)
- Salem Abu Bakr Mohammed Thabet Al-Awlaki (6 February 2026–2 November 2026)
- Abdel Nasser Al-Wali (17 December 2020–6 February 2026)
- Nabil Hasan al-Faqi (2018–2020)
- Ahmed Luqman (2014)

== See also ==
- Cabinet of Yemen
- Politics of Yemen
