= Ministry of Oil and Minerals (Yemen) =

Government ministry of Yemen

- Emblem of Yemen

Ministry overview
- Formed: 1990
- Jurisdiction: Government of Yemen
- Headquarters: Aden, Sana'a
- Ministry executive: Mohammed Abdullah Ali Bamqa'a, Minister of Oil and Minerals
- Website: http://mom-ye.com/site-ar/

Ministry of Oil and Minerals (Arabic: وزارة النفط والمعادن ) is a cabinet ministry of Yemen.

== List of ministers ==
- Mohammed Abdullah Ali Bamqa'a (6 February 2026 – present)
- Saeed Sulaiman al-Shamasi (28 July 2022 – 6 February 2026)
- Abdulsalam Abdullah Baaboud (18 December 2020 – 28 July 2022)
- Aws al-Awd (2017–2020)
- Mohamed Abdullah Nahban (9 November 2014)

== See also ==
- Cabinet of Yemen
- Politics of Yemen
- Ministry of Oil and Minerals (in Arabic)
