= Ministry of Water and Environment (Yemen) =

Government ministry of Yemen

Ministry of Water and Environment (Arabic: وزارة المياه والبيئة ) is a cabinet ministry of Yemen.

== List of ministers ==
- Tawfiq Abdulwahid Ali Al-Sharjabi (18 December 2020 – present)
- Azi Shuraim (2014)

== See also ==
- Cabinet of Yemen
- Politics of Yemen
