= Ministry of Youth and Sports (Yemen) =

Government ministry of Yemen

The Ministry of Youth and Sports (Arabic: وزارة الإعلام) is a cabinet ministry of Yemen.

== List of ministers ==
- Nayef Saleh Abdulqader al-Bakri (14 September 2015 – present)
- Rafat al-Akhali (9 November 2014 – September 2015)
- Abdulwahhab Rawih (1994 – 2001)

== See also ==
- Cabinet of Yemen
- Politics of Yemen
