= Ministry of Information (Yemen) =

Government ministry of Yemen

- Emblem of Yemen

Ministry overview
- Formed: 1990
- Jurisdiction: Government of Yemen
- Headquarters: Aden, Sana'a
- Minister responsible: Salem Abubakr Mohammed Thabit al-Awlaki, Minister of Information

The Ministry of Information (Arabic: وزارة الإعلام, romanized: Wizārat al-Iʻlām) is a cabinet ministry of Yemen.

== List of ministers ==
- Salem Abubakr Mohammed Thabit al-Awlaki (2 November 2026 – present)
- Muammar Al-Iryani (18 September 2016 – 2 November 2026)
- Mohamed Qubaty (1 December 2015 – 18 September 2016)
- Nadia al-Sakkaf (7 November 2014 – 1 December 2015)
- Nasr Taha Mustafa (June 2014 – November 2014)
- Ali al-Amrani (7 December 2011 – June 2014)
- Hassan al-Lawzi (11 February 2006 – 2011)
- Hussein Dhaif Allah al-Awadi (4 April 2001)
- Abdulrahman al-Akwa'a (1997)
- Mohamed Salem Basindwa (6 October 1994)
- Hassan al-Lawzi (1993)
- Mohamed Jurhum (1990)

== See also ==
- Cabinet of Yemen
- Politics of Yemen
