= Ministry of Electricity and Energy (Yemen) =

Government ministry of Yemen

Republic of Yemen Ministry of Electricity and Energy
- Emblem of Yemen

Ministry overview
- Formed: 1990
- Jurisdiction: Government of Yemen
- Headquarters: Aden, Sana'a
- Ministry executive: Adnan Mohammed Omar Al-Kaf, Minister of Electricity and Energy
- Website: moee-ye.com/site-ar/

The Ministry of Electricity and Energy (Arabic: وزارة الكهرباء والطاقة) is a cabinet ministry of Yemen.

== Ministers ==
- Adnan Mohammed Omar Al-Kaf (6 February 2026 – present)
- Mana'a Saleh Yaslam (28 July 2022 – 6 February 2026)
- Anwar Mohamed Ali Kalshat ( 18 December 2020 – 27 July 2022)

== See also ==
- Cabinet of Yemen
- Politics of Yemen
