= Ministry of Social Affairs and Labour (Yemen) =

Government ministry of Yemen

Ministry of Social Affairs and Labour (Arabic: وزارة الشؤون الاجتماعية والعمل ) is a cabinet ministry of Yemen.

== List of ministers ==
- Mukhtar Omar Saleh Al-Yafei (6 February 2026 – present)
- Mohamad Saeed Al-Zaouri (18 December 2020 – 6 February 2026)
- Ahmed Mohamed al-Shami (2014)
- Qabul al-Mutawkel (2014)

== See also ==
- Cabinet of Yemen
- Politics of Yemen
