= Ministry of Agriculture and Irrigation (Yemen) =

Government ministry of Yemen

Minister of Agriculture, Irrigation and Fisheries
- Emblem of Yemen

Ministry overview
- Formed: 1990
- Jurisdiction: Government of Yemen
- Headquarters: Aden, Sana'a
- Ministry executive: Salem Al-Saqtari, Minister of Agriculture, Irrigation and Fisheries

Minister of Agriculture, Irrigation and Fisheries (Arabic: وزارة الزراعة والري ) is a cabinet ministry of Yemen.

== List of ministers ==
- Salem Abdullah Issa Al-Saqtari (18 December 2020 – present)
- Othman Mujali (2018–2020)
- Farid Ahmed Mujaour (2014)

== See also ==
- Cabinet of Yemen
- Politics of Yemen
