= Ministry of Industry and Trade (Yemen) =

Government ministry of Yemen

Ministry of Industry and Trade (Arabic: وزارة الصناعة والتجارة ) is a cabinet ministry of Yemen.

== List of ministers ==
- Mohammed Mohammed Hizam Al-Ashwal (18 December 2020 – present)
- Mohamed Saeed al-Sadi (2014)
- Saadaldeen Talib (2011-2014)

== See also ==
- Cabinet of Yemen
- Politics of Yemen
