= Ministry of Tourism (Yemen) =

Government ministry of Yemen

- Emblem of Yemen

Ministry overview
- Formed: 1990
- Jurisdiction: Government of Yemen
- Headquarters: Aden, Sana'a
- Minister responsible: Muti'a Ahmed Qasim Dammaj, Minister of Information, Culture and Tourism

The Ministry of Tourism (Arabic: وزارة السياحة) is a cabinet ministry of Yemen.

== List of ministers ==
- Muti'a Ahmed Qasim Dammaj (6 February 2026 – present)
- Muammar Al-Iryani (18 December 2020 – 6 February 2026)
- Professor Mohamed A. Qubaty (18 September 2016 – December 2020)
- Muammar Al-Iryani (7 November 2014 – September 2016)

== See also ==
- Cabinet of Yemen
- Politics of Yemen
