= Cabinet of Yemen =

Governing body of Yemen

The Cabinet of Yemen or Yemeni Government or Yemenite Government is the executive body of the internationally recognized government of the Republic of Yemen, appointed by Rashad al-Alimi as the chairman of the Presidential Leadership Council (PLC). The unrecognized rival government established in 2016 in Sanaa by the Houthis and the pro-Houthi faction of the General People's Congress (GPC) to rule areas of Yemen under their control has its own cabinet, the Supreme Political Council in Sanaa.

== History ==
In 2011, following the Yemeni Revolution—part of the broader Arab Spring protest movement, which included a bloody assassination attempt against President Ali Abdullah Saleh—and as part of a political transition plan long advocated and supported by the Gulf states, Vice President Abdrabbuh Mansour Hadi assumed the role of acting president in accordance with constitutional procedure, and oversaw a national dialogue aimed at drafting a more inclusive, federal-style constitution. Upon the return of Saleh—who had by then become an honorary president—new extraordinary parliamentary elections were scheduled for January 2012, which led to the formal inauguration of Abdrabbuh Mansour Hadi as the new President of the Republic.

In 2014 the Houthis rapidly advanced south from Saada and seize Sanaa on 21 September with help from Saleh. In 2015, Hadi tried to announce a new federal constitution. The Houthis, who opposed the constitution, arrested him and forced him to resign. He escaped to Aden and declared it as the interim capital. He also asked the international community to intervene, triggering the Saudi led Arab military coalition intervention. Some analysts considered the Hadi-led government to be a satellite regime of Saudi Arabia and the UAE.

As part of the Yemeni civil war, the cabinet authority is contested by the Houthis, who took over the capital Sanaa in an armed rebellion against the government and formed the Supreme Revolutionary Committee and Supreme Political Council in 2015. President Hadi was placed under house arrest, but managed to escape to his hometown of Aden, which he declared as the temporary capital, before moving to Riyadh, earning his government the disparaging nickname of the "hotel government". The United Nation Security Council resolution 2201 denounced the actions of Houthis. UN security council's resolution 2216 declared that it considers the Hadi-led government as the "legitimate Government of Yemen" and denounced what it described as the "unilateral actions taken by the Houthis".

Mansur Hadi resigned on 7 April 2022, after transferring his presidential powers to the eight-member Presidential Leadership Council (PLC). PLC officially assumed power on 17 April 2022. The PLC's chairman, Rashad al-Alimi, subsequently became the president of the Republic of Yemen.

== Internationally recognised Yemeni Government of Presidential Leadership Council (PLC) ==
As of 2026, members of the cabinet were as follows:

Office	Incumbent	Start	End
Prime Minister	Shaya al-Zindani	15 January 2026	Incumbent
Minister of Interior	Ibrahim Ali Ahmed Haidan (reconfirmed)	17 December 2020	Incumbent
Minister of Information	Salem Abubakr Mohammed Thabit al-Awlaki	2 November 2026	Incumbent
Ministry of Foreign Affairs and Expatriates	Afrah Abdulaziz al-Zouba	23 July 2026	Incumbent
Minister of Defense	Taher al-Aqili	6 February 2026	Incumbent
Minister of Finance	Marwan Faraj Saeed bin Ghanem	6 February 2026	Incumbent
Minister of Justice	Judge Badr Abdo Ahmed Al-Aradha	6 February 2026	Incumbent
Minister of Tourism	Muti'a Ahmed Qasim Dammaj	6 February 2026	Incumbent
Minister of Electricity and Energy	Adnan Mohammed Omar Al-Kaf	6 February 2026	Incumbent
Minister of Youth and Sport	Nayef Saleh Abdulqader al-Bakri (reconfirmed)	15 September 2015	Incumbent
Minister of Civil Service and Insurance	Akram Naseeb Ahmed al-Amiri	2 November 2026	Incumbent
Ministry of Public Health and Population	Qassem Mohammad Qassem Bahaibah (reconfirmed)	18 December 2020	Incumbent
Minister of Higher Education and Scientific Research	Ameen Noman Mohammed Al-Qadsi	6 February 2026	Incumbent
Minister of Public Works and Highways	Hussein Awad Saeed Al-Aqrabi	6 February 2026	Incumbent
Minister of Social Affairs and Labour	Mukhtar Omar Saleh Al-Yafei	6 February 2026	Incumbent
Minister of Oil and Minerals	Mohammed Abdullah Ali Bamqa'a	6 February 2026	Incumbent
Minister of Religious Endowments and Guidance	Sheikh Turki Abdullah Ali Al-Wadei	6 February 2026	Incumbent
Minister of Agriculture, Irrigation and Fisheries	Salem Abdullah Issa Al-Saqtari (reconfirmed)	18 December 2020	Incumbent
Minister of Culture	Muti'a Ahmed Qasim Dammaj	6 February 2026	Incumbent
Minister of Transport	Mohsen Ali Haidarah Qasim Al-Omari	6 February 2026	Incumbent
Minister of Human Rights	Mashdal Mohammed Omar Ahmed (reconfirmed)	18 December 2020	Incumbent
Minister of Legal Affairs	Judge Ishraq Fadl Al-Maqtari	6 February 2026	Incumbent
Minister of Local Administration	Ahmed Saleh Ahmed al-Awlaki	2 November 2026	Incumbent
Minister of Planning and International Cooperation	Mohammed Abdullah Ahmed Al-Faqmi	25 August 2026	Incumbent
Minister of Telecommunications and Information Technology	Shadi Saleh Basurra	6 February 2026	Incumbent
Minister of Industry and Trade	Mohammed Mohammed Hizam Al-Ashwal (reconfirmed)	18 December 2020	Incumbent
Minister of Water and Environment	Tawfiq Abdulwahid Ali Al-Sharjabi (reconfirmed)	18 December 2020	Incumbent
Minister of Education	Adel Abdulmajid Alawi Al-Abbadi	6 February 2026	Incumbent
Minister of Technical Education and Vocational Training	Anwar Mohammed Ali Kalshat Al-Mahri	6 February 2026	Incumbent
Minister of State for Women’s Affairs	Ahd Mohammed Salem Ja'sous	6 February 2026	Incumbent
Minister of State for Parliamentary and Shura Council Affairs	Abdullah Ali Hussein Abu Hurriya	6 February 2026	Incumbent
Minister of State and Secretary of the Capital Sana’a	Abdulghani Hefzullah Jameel (reconfirmed)	18 September 2016	Incumbent
Minister of State and Governor of Aden Governorate	Abdulrahman Sheikh Al-Yafei	6 February 2026	Incumbent
Ministers of State	Ahmed Saleh Ahmed Al-Awlaki, Judge Akram Naseeb Ahmed Al-Ameri, Walid Mohammed Mohammed Al-Qudaimi, Walid Ali Ismail Al-Abarah	6 February 2026	Incumbent

== Supreme Political Council (SPC) ==
The Supreme Political Council (SPC; Arabic: المجلس السياسي الأعلى, romanized: al-Majlis as-Siyāsiyy al-ʾAʿlā), also referred to as the Sanaa government, is an extraconstitutional rival executive established in 2016 in Sanaa by the Houthis and the pro-Houthi faction of the General People's Congress (GPC) to rule areas of Yemen under their control (formerly in the Yemen Arab Republic, AKA North Yemen) opposed to the internationally recognized Presidential Leadership Council (PLC) in Aden. The SPC carries out the functions of head of state in Yemen, appointing the country's cabinet and managing Yemeni state affairs in a bid to fill in political vacuum during the Yemeni Civil War. The Council aims to outline a basis for running the country and managing state affairs on the basis of the constitution. Since 2018, the SPC has been headed by Mahdi al-Mashat as Chairman of the Council.

On 10 August 2024, Ahmed al-Rahawi was appointed as prime minister of Yemen and tasked with forming a ministry known as the 'Government of Change and Construction' by the President of the Supreme Political Council Mahdi al-Mashat. Two days later the composition of the new government was announced in a presidential resolution. On 18 August 2024, the House of Representatives (San'aa) gave confidence to the government and called on it to follow a 36-point 'general program' prepared by a house of representatives special committee. The government and SPC continue to be internationally unrecognised in comparison with the Presidential Leadership Council (PLC).

On 28 August 2025, a series of Israeli airstrikes killed Rahawi and nine other ministers.

Incumbent
† Assassinated

Government of Change and Construction
Portfolio (ministries)	Minister	Term start	Term end	Ref
Prime Minister of Yemen	Ahmed al-Rahawi	10 August 2024	28 August 2025 †	
Prime Minister of Yemen	Muhammad Ahmed Miftah	30 August 2025	Incumbent	
First Deputy Prime Minister	Muhammad Ahmed Miftah	12 August 2024	30 August 2025	
Deputy Prime Minister for Defence and Security Affairs	Lt-General Jalal Ali Ali Al-Rowaishan	12 August 2024	Incumbent	
Deputy Prime Minister for Administration, Local and Rural Development	Mohamed Hassan Ismail Al-Madani	12 August 2024	Incumbent	
Minister of Defense	Maj-General Mohamed al-Atifi	12 August 2024	Incumbent	
Ministry of Interior	Maj-General Abdul Karim Amir al-Din al-Houthi	12 August 2024	Incumbent	
Minister of Justice and Human Rights	Judge Mujahid Ahmed Abdullah Ali	12 August 2024	28 August 2025 †	
Minister of Civil Service and Administrative Development	Khaled Hussein Saleh Al-Hawali	12 August 2024	Incumbent	
Minister of Transport and Public Works	Maj-General Mohamed Ayyash Mohamed Qahim	12 August 2024	Incumbent	
Minister of Finance	Abdul-Jabbar Ahmed Mohammed Mohammed	12 August 2024	Incumbent	
Minister of Economy, Industry and Investment	Moeen Hashem Ahmed Al-Mahagri	12 August 2024	28 August 2025 †	
Minister of Agriculture, Fisheries and Water Resources	Radwan Ali Ali Al-Rubai	12 August 2024	28 August 2025 †	
Minister of Education and Scientific Research	Hassan Abdullah Yahya Al-Saadi	12 August 2024	Incumbent	
Minister of Foreign Affairs and Emigrants	Jamal Amer	12 August 2024	28 August 2025 †	
Minister of Oil and Minerals	Abdullah Abdulaziz Abdulrahman Al-Amir	12 August 2024	Incumbent	
Minister of Electricity, Energy and Water	Ali Saif Mohamed Hassan	12 August 2024	28 August 2025 †	
Minister of Health and Environment	Ali Abdul Karim Ali Shaiban	12 August 2024	Incumbent	
Minister of Culture and Tourism	Ali Qasim Hussein Al Yafei	12 August 2024	28 August 2025 †	
Minister of Social Affairs and Labour	Samir Mohamed Ahmed Bajaala	12 August 2024	28 August 2025 †	
Minister of Information	Hashem Ahmed Abdulrahman Sharafuddin	12 August 2024	28 August 2025 †	
Minister of Youth and Sports	Mohamed Ali Ahmed Al-Mawlid	12 August 2024	28 August 2025 †	
Minister of Communications and Information Technology	Mohammed Ahmed Mohammed Al-Mahdi	12 August 2024	Incumbent	

== See also ==
- Yemeni Revolution
- Supreme Political Council
- Yemen civil wars
