= Politics of Yemen =

National government in West Asia

The politics of Yemen are in an uncertain state due to the Yemeni civil war and Houthi takeover of parts of the country. The Houthis, an armed Shia Islamist group, took over the western part of Yemen including the capital Sana'a in 2014. The Houthis eventually formed the Supreme Political Council (SPC), which governs the Houthi-controlled parts of the country. The incumbent president, Abdrabbuh Mansour Hadi, fled to Aden and established a rival government, which remains the internationally recognized government of Yemen. In 2022, President Hadi resigned, transferring power to the Presidential Leadership Council, a collective head of state led by Rashad al-Alimi.

The government of Yemen, also referred to as the Republic of Yemen Government (ROYG), is (or was prior to the 2014 coup?), at least nominally, a representative democracy and republic with a semi-presidential system and a consitution. The president, who is elected by popular vote from at least two candidates endorsed by Parliament, is the head of state, and appoints the prime minister, who is the head of government and is responsible for the cabinet. Since 2022, executive power is held by the Presidential Leadership Council (PLC), a body of eight members led by chairman Rashad al-Alimi.

Yemen has been a unitary state. In December 2013, the Southern Issue working group of the National Dialogue Conference decided that Yemen should become a federal state. Although it is notionally a multi-party system, in reality, it is completely dominated by one party, the General People's Congress, and had been since unification. Legislative power is vested in a bicameral legislature, consisting of an appointed 111-member Shura Council and an elected 301-seat House of Representatives. The Judiciary is theoretically independent, but in reality, it is prone to interference from the executive branch.

The presidential term of office is 7 years, and the parliamentary term of elected office is 6 years. Suffrage is universal over 18. However, the last presidential elections took place in 2012, and the last parliamentary elections were held in 2003.

== Political background ==
For hundreds of years, Yemen was ruled by imams who had absolute power over the political process in the country. The imams of Yemen and later the Kings of Yemen were religiously consecrated leaders belonging to the Zaidiyyah branch of Shia Islam. They established a blend of religious and secular rule in parts of Yemen from 897. Their imamate endured under varying circumstances until the republican revolution in 1962. Zaidiyyah theology differed from Ismailis or Twelver Shi'ites by stressing the presence of an active and visible imam as leader. This came to an end with the assassination of Imam Yehia. His son, Imam Ahmad succeeded him but the political situation deteriorated with the beginning of the North Yemen Civil War in 1962 with the overthrow of Imam Badr and the setting of a new, Republican regime.

While in the North, during the civil war, the pro-monarch and pro-republican forces fought for power, the South of Yemen was under British control. During the 1960s, the British sought to incorporate all of the Aden Protectorate territories into the Federation. On 18 January 1963, the Colony of Aden was incorporated against the wishes of much of the city's populace as the State of Aden, and the Federation was renamed the Federation of South Arabia. Several more states subsequently joined the Federation and the remaining states that declined to join, mainly in Hadhramaut, formed the Protectorate of South Arabia. In 1963 fighting between Egyptian forces and British-led Saudi-financed guerrillas in the Yemen Arab Republic spread to South Arabia with the formation of the National Liberation Front (NLF), who hoped to force the British out of South Arabia. Hostilities started with a grenade attack by the NLF against the British High Commissioner on 10 December 1963, killing one person and injuring fifty, and a state of emergency was declared, becoming known as the Aden Emergency. In 1964, the new British government under Harold Wilson announced their intention to hand over power to the Federation of South Arabia in 1968, but that the British military would remain. In 1964, there were around 280 guerrilla attacks, and over 500 in 1965. In 1966 the British Government announced that all British forces would be withdrawn at independence. In response, the security situation deteriorated with the creation of the socialist Front for the Liberation of Occupied South Yemen (FLOSY) which started to attack the NLF in a bid for power, as well as attacking the British. The British were defeated and driven from Aden by the end of November 1967, earlier than had been planned by British Prime Minister Harold Wilson and without an agreement on the succeeding governance. Their enemies, the NLF, managed to seize power, with Aden itself under NLF control. The Royal Marines, who had been the first British troops to occupy Aden in 1839, were the last to leave. The Federation of South Arabia collapsed and Southern Yemen became independent as the People's Republic of South Yemen.

Following this Yemen suffered from a highly fractured political landscape, which is the legacy of the regime of President Ali Abd Allah Saleh, who came to power in 1978 and formally resigned his office in February 2012.

=== Reunification ===
The Republic of Yemen (ROY) was declared on 22 May 1990 with Saleh becoming president and al-Baidh Vice President. For the first time in centuries, much of Greater Yemen was politically united. A 30-month transitional period for completing the unification of the two political and economic systems was set. A presidential council was jointly elected by the 26-member YAR advisory council and the 17-member PDRY presidium. The presidential council appointed a Prime Minister, who formed a Cabinet. There was also a 301-seat provisional unified parliament, consisting of 159 members from the north, 111 members from the south, and 31 independent members appointed by the chairman of the council.

A unity constitution was agreed upon in May 1990 and ratified by the populace in May 1991. It affirmed Yemen's commitment to free elections, a multiparty political system, the right to own private property, equality under the law, and respect for basic human rights. Parliamentary elections were held on 27 April 1993. International groups assisted in the organization of the elections and observed actual balloting. The resulting Parliament included 143 GPC, 69 YSP, 63 Islaah (Yemeni grouping for reform, a party composed of various tribal and religious groups), six Baathis, three Nasserists, two Al Haq, and 15 independents. The head of Islaah, Paramount Hashid Sheik Abdallah Bin Husayn Al-Ahmar, was the speaker of Parliament.

From late 1991 through early 1992, deteriorating economic conditions led to significant domestic unrest, including several riots. Legislative elections were nonetheless held in early 1993, and in May the two former ruling parties, the GPC and the YSP merged to create a single political party with an overall majority in the new House of Representatives. In August Vice President al Baydh exiled himself voluntarily to Aden, and the country's general security situation deteriorated as political rivals settled scores and tribal elements took advantage of the widespread unrest. In January 1994, representatives of the main political parties signed a document of pledge and accord in Amman, Jordan, that was designed to resolve the ongoing crisis. Despite this, clashes intensified until civil war broke out in early May 1994.

=== Yemeni uprising ===
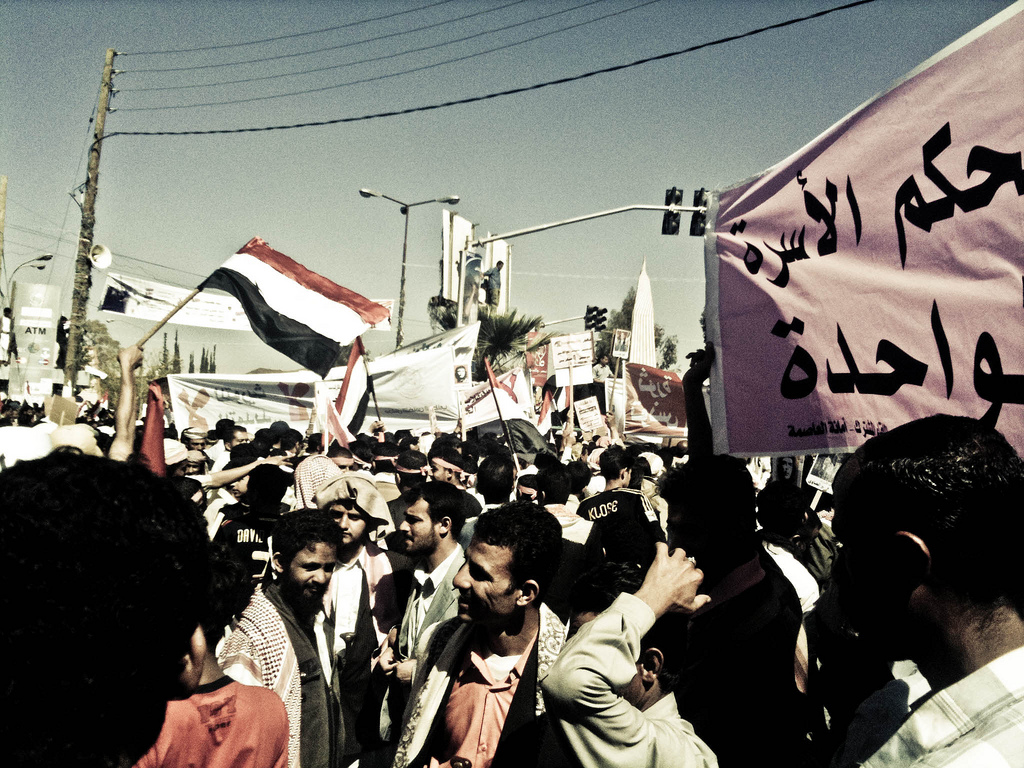
Protesters in Sanaa on 3 February

The 2011 Yemeni revolution followed the initial stages of the Arab Spring and began simultaneously with the Egyptian Revolution. The protests were initially against unemployment, economic conditions, and corruption, as well as against the government's proposals to modify the constitution of Yemen. The protestors' demands then escalated to calls for President Ali Abdullah Saleh to resign.

The situation however quickly deteriorated into a widescale uprising, with various insurgency campaigns consolidating into armed struggles, both between the armed opposition and terror groups vs. the government and among themselves. Eventually, a Saudi-brokered agreement on Saleh's resignation and 2012 Presidential election saw the installation of Abdrabbuh Mansour Hadi as an interim President. Hadi has been presiding over political reform and national reconciliation and was supposed to serve only two years in the post. In November 2013 U.N. envoy Jamal Benomar told the Associated Press Hadi will remain president after February 2014 because the transition is not likely to be completed earlier due to "obstruction" from former regime loyalists.

== Executive branch ==
Under the Constitution, the President is elected by direct, popular vote for a seven-year term. The vice-president, prime minister, and deputy prime ministers are appointed by the President. The Council of Ministers is appointed by the President on the advice of the prime minister.

The president of Yemen is the head of state and the Supreme Commander of the Armed Forces. It is the highest authority in Yemen per Article 119 of the constitution. The president appoints the prime minister, who has the responsibility of forming the cabinet (also known as the Council of Ministers) in consultation with the president. The cabinet consists of 32 ministers who propose and draft legislation to submit to parliament or to the president depending on circumstances.

By 2021, the executive branch was regarded as the only funcional branch of the government. Executive powers were transferred by President Abdrabbuh Mansour Hadi to the Presidential Leadership Council (PLC) in 2022, a body consisting of eight members each representing factions in the civil war opposed to the Houthis. The chairman has "primary executive authority" within the council, leading the body and representing Yemen internationally.

=== Internationally recognised leadership in Aden ===
Main office-holders
Office	Name	Party	Since
Chairman of the Presidential Leadership Council	Rashad al-Alimi	General People's Congress	7 April 2022
Prime Minister	Shaya al-Zindani	General People's Congress	6 February 2026

=== Rival leadership in Sanaa ===
Main office-holders
Office	Name	Party	Since
Chairman of the Supreme Political Council	Mahdi al-Mashat	Houthis	25 April 2018
Prime Minister	Muhammad Miftah	Party of Truth	30 August 2025

== Legislative branch ==
Since the amendments to the constitution in 2001, Yemen has operated under a bicameral legislature consisting of the Assembly or House of Representatives (Majlis al-Nuwaab) and the Consultative or Shura Council. The House of Representatives is the lower house of the parliament, with 301 seats and members who are elected from single-member districts to serve six-year terms. It possesses oversight responsibilities over the executive branch and "discusses, ratifies, rejects, and amends legislation". It is required to approve the cabinet through a vote of confidence. In May 1997, the president created a Consultative Council, which is sometimes referred to as the upper house of the parliament and primarily serves an advisory role, with 111 members each selected by the president for indefinite terms. The president of the Consultative Council was Abdul Aziz Abdul Ghani prior to his death in August 2011.

The House of Representatives regularly convenes twice a year, although extraordinary sessions can be convened by the president, by a vote of two-thirds within the parliament or by the Presiding Board of the Parliament, which is composed of the speaker and three officials elected from among the MPs. The 2001 constitutional amendments granted the Shura Council limited roles in legislature, including participation in joint meetings with the House of Representatives to discuss and approve defense-related legislation, treaties, and agreements, or any matter presented by the president for a joint meeting.

The last parliamentary elections held in Yemen were during 2003. As of 2025, 132 of the 301 MPs elected in 2003 are still associated with the government, while the rest are either part of the Houthi-backed rival parliament, are identified as within a "gray zone", or have died in office. The faction of the House of Representatives aligned with the government convened in 2019 for the first time since the war began, doing so once more in 2022. Most remaining parliamentarians live abroad, while the parliament itself has faced difficulty convening in the temporary capital of Aden.

== Political parties and elections ==
In April 2003 parliamentary elections, the General People's Congress (GPC) maintained an absolute majority. International observers described the elections as "another significant step forward on Yemen's path toward democracy; however, sustained and forceful efforts must be undertaken to remedy critical flaws in the country's election and political processes." There were some problems with underage voting, confiscation of ballot boxes, voter intimidation, and election-related violence; moreover, the political opposition in Yemen has little access to the media, since most outlets are owned or otherwise controlled by the government.

The 2006 elections were described in positive wording, and the elections were monitored by a number of international observers. The EU's Election Observation Mission to Yemen has published this final report on the elections: Yemeni media reported on the 22.01.2007 that the opposition coalition JMP has set up a Shadow government "to play an effective role in the political, economic and social life". The ruling party GPC called upon the opposition to "acquaint themselves with constitutional systems before starting to talk every now and then about...rosy dreams and illusions".

== Judicial branch ==
The judicial branches of the Yemeni government consist of the lower court and the supreme court. Both are nominally required to be independent, although the Supreme Judicial Council, a monitoring body appointed by the executive, retains de facto control over the system.

The former northern and southern legal codes have been unified. The legal system includes separate commercial courts and a Supreme Court based in Sanaa. The Quran is the basis for all laws, and no law may contradict it. Indeed, many court cases are debated on the religious basis of the laws i.e. by interpretations of the Quran. For this reason, many judges are religious scholars as well as legal authorities.

== Administrative divisions ==
Yemen is divided into 21 governorates (muhafazat, singular: muhafazah) along with the capital city of Sanaa (Amanat Al-Asimah). The governorates are Abyan, Adan, Amran, Al Asimah, Al Bayda, Al Dhale’e, Al Hudaydah, Al Jawf, Al Mahrah, Al Mahwit, Dhamar, Hadhramawt, Hajjah, Ibb, Lahij, Ma’rib, Raymah, Sa’dah, Shabwah (Ataq), Socotra, and Ta’izz.

== Provincial and local government ==
Formal government authority is centralized in the capital city of Sanaa. Yemen's Local Authority Law decentralized authority by establishing locally elected district and governorate councils (last elected in September 2006), formerly headed by government-appointed governors. After the September 2006 local and governorate council elections, President Salih announced various measures that would enable future governors and directors of the councils to be directly elected. In May 2008, governors were elected for the first time. However, because the ruling party, the General People's Congress (GPC), continues to dominate the local and governorate councils, the May 2008 elections retained this party's executive authority over the governorates. In rural Yemen, direct state control is weak, with tribal confederations acting as autonomous sub-states.

== See also ==
- Foreign relations of Yemen
- Constitution of Yemen
- Al-Qaeda in the Arabian Peninsula (AQAP)
- State feminism (section: Yemen)
