= 2024 in Yemen =

- President: Rashad al-Alimi
- Prime minister: Ahmad Awad bin Mubarak
- Population: 41,046,545

- Decades: 2000s; 2010s; 2020s
- See also: Other events of 2024: History of Yemen; Timeline; Years

The following events occurred in Yemen in the year 2024.

== Incumbents ==
Aden government (Presidential Leadership Council)

Photo	Post	Name
	Chairman of Presidential Leadership Council	Rashad al-Alimi
	Prime Minister of Yemen	Maeen Abdulmalik Saeed (until 5 February 2024)
	Prime Minister of Yemen	Ahmad Awad bin Mubarak (from 5 February 2024)

Sanaa government (Supreme Political Council)

Photo	Post	Name
	Leader of Ansar Allah	Abdul-Malik al-Houthi
	Chairman of the Supreme Political Council	Mahdi al-Mashat
	Prime Minister of Yemen	Abdel-Aziz bin Habtour
	Prime Minister of Yemen	Ahmed al-Rahawi

== Events ==
=== January ===
- 10 January – The United Nations Security Council adopts a resolution condemning Houthi attacks on merchant ships in the Red Sea.
- 12 January – 2024 missile strikes against Yemen:
  - The United States and United Kingdom launch airstrikes against Houthi-controlled areas in response to attacks on international trade in the Red Sea, which itself was in response to the Israeli war on Gaza in which Houthis supports Hamas. Explosions are reported in the capital Sanaa and port city of Al Hudaydah, with at least five Houthi militants killed.
  - US officials confirm more than a dozen Houthi sites have been targeted with Tomahawk missiles launched from US Navy warships and fighter jets. The military targets allegedly include logistical hubs, air defence systems and weapons storage locations.
  - A large protest erupts in Sanaa denouncing the US-led strikes against Yemen.
- 13 January – The US Navy conducts additional strikes targeting Houthi-held territory in Yemen.
- 15 January – The Iranian-backed Houthi movement attack on the Gibraltar Eagle the Marshall Islands-flagged, United States-owned and operated bulk carrier Gibraltar Eagle.
- 16 January:
  - A Greek-owned bulk carrier is hit by a missile launched from Houthi-controlled territory with minor damage reported. Separately, the US launches more airstrikes on Houthi positions, destroying four anti-ship missiles that were being prepared for launch.
  - British multinational oil and gas company Shell suspends all Red Sea shipments indefinitely amid Houthi attacks on commercial vessels.
- 17 January: Operation Prosperity Guardian:
  - The US redesignates the Houthi Movement as a terrorist organization in response to continuing attacks in the Red Sea.
  - The United States Central Command says another round of strikes destroyed 14 anti-ship missiles that were being prepared to launch at merchant vessels and US Navy ships in the region.
- 20 January: US Navy F/A-18s operating from the aircraft carrier USS Dwight D. Eisenhower carry out another wave of airstrikes on Houthi missile launchers, with explosions reported in Al Hudaydah.
- 22 January: The US and UK launch new airstrikes on Houthi military infrastructure, including an underground storage site, anti-ship missiles, and radars. The UK confirms that four Royal Air Force Typhoons took part in the airstrikes.
- 27 January: Marlin Luanda missile strike: Houthi missiles hit a British Trafigura oil tanker. Earlier, the USS Carney shot down a Houthi missile which had been fired at the warship.

=== February ===
- 16 February: United States officials confirm that a cyberattack was carried out on the MV Beshad, an Iranian alleged spy ship in the Red Sea, to inhibit the ship from sharing intelligence with Houthi forces.
- 22 February – A Palau-flagged cargo ship en route to Egypt is set ablaze after being hit by an anti-ship missile in the Gulf of Aden, according to the United Kingdom Maritime Trade Operations. No casualties are reported.
- 25 February – The U.S. military launches strikes against 18 Houthi targets.

=== March ===
- 2 March –
  - The abandoned Rubymar that was struck by a Houthi anti-ship missile, sinks.
  - The Italian Navy destroyer Caio Duilio shoots down a Houthi drone in self-defence while in the Red Sea.
- 6 March – The Barbados-flagged bulk carrier MV True Confidence is hit by a Houthi ballistic missile in the Red Sea, killing two crewmen and wounding six others. The remaining crew abandon the vessel.
- 11 March – An explosion near a ship in the Red Sea is suspected to have been an attack by Houthi rebels, though the blast caused no damage.
- 18 March – A women's protest occurs in Hamdan district, Sana'a which the group organisers say was for denouncing the "crimes of Israel in Gaza".
- 19 March – Houthis blow up a house in Radaa, killing nine members of a family and collapsing four nearby buildings in retaliation for the homeowner allegedly setting up an ambush that killed two Houthi militants.
- 20 March – Four people are killed when a Houthi rocket strikes their home during a clash in Radaa as residents attempt to prevent the group from destroying their properties.

=== April ===
- 3 April – The Women's Sector of the Ministry of Youth and Sports initiates Giving to the Giving People to support families of "martyrs" with products from Belqis Library Development Center and Women's Leadership Preparation Center, including clothes, bags, accessories, incense, and perfume.
- 20 April – A child is killed by an explosion of a leftover US-Saudi cluster bomb in Sirwah District, Marib Governorate.
- 29 April – Six soldiers of the Southern Transitional Council are killed and 11 others injured in a bomb attack on their vehicle in Mudiyah District, Abyan Governorate. The attack is blamed on al-Qaeda in the Arabian Peninsula.

=== May ===
- 9 May – The Houthis claim responsibility for attacks on two container ships in the Gulf of Aden and one in the Indian Ocean.
- 27 May – The Houthis claim to have attacked three merchant ships and two United States Navy destroyers.
- 28 May – A Marshall Islands-flagged bulk carrier takes on water after being hit by three missiles off the Yemeni coast.
- 30 May – 30 May 2024 Yemen strikes: Sixteen people are killed in US and British airstrikes on Houthi-controlled areas of Yemen.
- 31 May – The Houthi Supreme Political Council states it launched an attack on the aircraft carrier USS Dwight D. Eisenhower, though American officials deny this.

=== June ===
- 1 June – A Houthi-controlled court in Sanaa sentences 44 people to death for collaborating with the Saudi-led coalition.
- 6 June – The Houthis and the Islamic Resistance in Iraq claim to have launched two joint military attacks against ships at the Port of Haifa in Israel. However, Israel denies the claims.
- 7 June:
  - The Houthis detain 11 Yemeni employees of United Nations agencies and others working for aid groups.
  - The U.S. and the United Kingdom reportedly carry out six airstrikes on Hodeida International Airport, the Port of Salif, and Al-Thawrah, according to a Houthi-run station.
- 10 June – Yemen migrant boat disaster: At least 49 people are killed and 140 others reported missing after a boat carrying migrants capsizes off the coast of Rudum District.
- 12 June – The Houthis strike the Greek-owned, Liberian-flagged cargo ship Tutor with an unmanned surface vehicle, causing the ship to take on water.
- 23 June – The Houthis claim to have carried out a joint military operation with the Islamic Resistance in Iraq to target four vessels in the Port of Haifa, Israel.

=== July ===
- 20 July – Israeli airstrikes hit oil refineries and power stations in the port of Hodeidah, killing and wounding several people.
- 21 July – The Houthis target the Israeli city of Eilat with multiple ballistic missiles, in response to the previous day's airstrikes.
- 23 July – The Yemeni government and the Houthis sign an agreement to de-escalate tensions, which will include relaxing banking restrictions on both sides and allowing flag carrier Yemenia to resume flights to Jordan.

=== August ===
- 3 August – The Houthis take control over the premises of the UN Human Rights Office in Sanaa.
- 5 August – The Houthis claim an attack on a Liberia-flagged container ship MV Groton in the Gulf of Aden.
- 7 August – At least 30 people are reported killed following days of flooding in Hodeidah and Hajjah.
- 16 August – A car bombing claimed by Al-Qaeda in the Arabian Peninsula kills 16 Southern Transitional Council soldiers and injures 18 others in Mudiyah District in Abyan Governorate.
- 18 August – 2024 Yemen floods: More than 100 people are killed during nearly three weeks of persistent heavy rainfall and flooding across Yemen, with the national weather agency declaring a severe weather alert for future "very heavy thunderstorms".
- 20 August – Thirteen people are killed and 14 others are reported missing after a boat carrying migrants sinks off the coast of Dhubab District, Taiz Governorate.
- 27 August – The Pentagon reports that the MT Sounion appears to be leaking its 150,000-ton supply of oil into the Red Sea and is still on fire since Houthi attacks on 22 August. Efforts to salvage the tanker have been repelled by Houthi threats.
- 29 August –
  - At least 33 people are killed and 38 others are reported missing following flash floods in Milhan District, Al Mahwit Governorate.
  - The Houthis release footage showing their fighters boarding and placing explosives on the Greek-flagged MT Sounion oil tanker, causing explosions that put the tanker at risk of causing a major oil spill in the Red Sea.
- 31 August – The Houthis claim to have attacked the Liberia-flagged container ship MV Groton for the second time in the Gulf of Aden.

=== September ===
- 2 September – The Houthis strike two crude oil tankers located in the Red Sea with multiple missiles and drones.
- 8 September – A bus overturns in Al Maqatirah District, killing 14 people and leaving only one injured survivor.
- 15 September – The Houthis fire a ballistic missile into an open area in Tel Aviv.
- 28 September – The Houthis launch a ballistic missile from Yemen towards Ben Gurion Airport in Israel, prompting air raid sirens in Tel Aviv and most of Central Israel.
- 29 September – Dozens of Israeli warplanes strike Houthi targets in Al Hudaydah and Ras Issa, including power plants and port facilities. Houthi-linked media outlets claim that Houthis emptied the facilities used to store fuel prior to the attack.

=== November ===
- 8 November – A soldier of the Presidential Leadership Council opens fire on Saudi troops in Seiyun, Hadhramaut Governorate, killing two and injuring another.
- 20 November – The Houthi movement is designated as a terrorist group by New Zealand.

=== December ===
- 19 December – The Israeli Air Force conducts several airstrikes on Red Sea ports and power stations near Sanaa, killing at least nine people.
- 19 December – The Israeli Air Force conducts several airstrikes on Sanaa International Airport, where the Director-General of the World Health Organization Tedros Adhanom Ghebreyesus was inside, and other targets across Yemen, killing at least six people. Ghebreyesus is unharmed.
- 27 December – Houthi political official Mohammed al-Bukhaiti vows to "...escalate our military targeting of Israel" until it stops "the genocide in Gaza".

== Art and entertainment ==
- List of Yemeni submissions for the Academy Award for Best International Feature Film

== Holidays ==
- 8–12 April – Eid al-Fitr
- 1 May – Labour Day
- 22 May – Unity Day
- 15–19 June – Eid al-Adha
- 7 July – Islamic New Year
- 15 September – Milad un-Nabi
- 26 September – Revolution Day
- 14 October – Liberation Day
- 30 November – Independence Day

== Deaths ==
- Abdu Ali Abdul Rahman, diplomat
- Khaled Sheikh, diplomat and politician
