= 2025 in Yemen =

- Decades: 2000s; 2010s; 2020s
- See also: Other events of 2025: History of Yemen; Timeline; Years

Events in the year 2025 in Yemen.

== Incumbents ==
Aden government (Presidential Leadership Council)

Photo	Post	Name
	Chairman of Presidential Leadership Council	Rashad al-Alimi
	Prime Minister of Yemen	Ahmad Awad bin Mubarak (5 February 2024 – 3 May 2025)
	Prime Minister of Yemen	Salem Saleh bin Braik (3 May 2025 – present)

Sanaa government (Supreme Political Council)

Photo	Post	Name
	Leader of Ansar Allah	Abdul-Malik al-Houthi
	Chairman of the Supreme Political Council	Mahdi al-Mashat
	Prime Minister of Yemen	Ahmed al-Rahawi (until 28 August)
	Prime Minister of Yemen	Muhammad Ahmed Miftah (since 30 August)

== Events ==
Ongoing: Red Sea crisis

=== January ===
- 11 January – At least 15 people are killed in an explosion at a gas station in Az Zahir District, Al Bayda Governorate.
- 22 January – The Houthis announce the release of the 25 crew of the cargo vessel Galaxy Leader, which the group seized in November 2023.
- 25 January – The Houthis release 153 prisoners of war.

=== February ===
- 10 February — A Yemeni dhow is hijacked by suspected pirates off the coast of Eyl, Somalia. The ship and its 12 crew are rescued on 13 February with the help of EUNAVFOR Atalanta.
- 18 February — A second Yemeni dhow is hijacked by suspected pirates off the coast of Eyl, Somalia. The vessel is abandoned by the hijackers on 22 February, leaving its crew unharmed.

=== March ===
- 6 March — Two boats carrying migrants sink off the coast of Dhubab district, Taiz Governorate, leaving 186 people missing.
- 15 March — The United States launches a wave of airstrikes on Houthi targets across Yemen, citing the group's attacks on shipping. Houthi authorities say that at least 53 people were killed in the strikes.
- 16 March — A third Yemeni dhow is hijacked by suspected pirates off the coast of Eyl, Somalia.

=== April ===
- 28 April — At least 68 African migrants are reported to have been killed in a US airstrike on a migrant detention center in Saada.

=== May ===
- 3 May — Ahmad Awad bin Mubarak resigns as prime minister of the internationally-recognized Presidential Leadership Council government, citing inability to undertake reforms and reshuffle his cabinet.
- 5 May — Israel launches airstrikes on Hodeidah port in retaliation for a Houthi rocket launch on Ben-Gurion Airport a day earlier.
- 6 May —
  - Israel launches airstrikes on Sanaa International Airport.
  - The United States announces an end to airstrikes against the Houthis after President Donald Trump says the group had "capitulated" amid a ceasefire announced by Oman.

=== June ===
- 4 June – US President Donald Trump issues a proclamation barring Yemeni nationals from entering the United States.
- 10 June – The Israeli Navy launches attacks on Houthi territory in Yemen for the first time, targeting the port of Hodeidah.

=== July ===
- 7 July –
  - Israel launches aerial attacks on Houthi territory in Yemen.
  - The Houthis attack and sink the cargo vessel Eternity C in the Red Sea, killing four sailors.
- 11 July – Five children are killed in a suspected artillery attack blamed on Al-Islah in Al-Hashamah, Taiz Governorate.
- 15 July – The Federal Constitutional Court of Germany dismisses a case brought about by Yemeni plaintiffs accusing the German government of failing to prevent deaths from US drone strikes on Yemen coordinated from Ramstein Air Base, citing the lack of a "sufficient connection" to the German state’s authority and "a serious danger of systematic violation" of international law.
- 27 July – Protests break out in Mukalla against 19-hour electricity outages blamed on fuel shortages.

=== August ===
- 3 August – A boat carrying 154 migrants and refugees from Ethiopia capsizes off Abyan Governorate, killing 96 passengers.
- 6 August – A boat carrying 250 migrants from Ethiopia lands in Arqah after losing seven passengers from starvation.
- 16 August – The Israeli Navy carries out airstrikes on the Hezyaz power plant near Sanaa.
- 24 August – Israel carries out airstrikes on several targets in Sanaa, killing 10 people and wounding 102 others, after the Houthis fire a cluster bomb at Israel for the first time.
- 28 August – Israel carries out airstrikes on Houthi targets in Sanaa, killing the Houthi prime minister Ahmed al-Rahawi and several of his ministers.
- 30 August – The Houthi government appoints Muhammad Ahmed Miftah as prime minister following the death of Ahmed al-Rahawi.
- 31 August – The Houthis carry out raids on United Nations offices in Sanaa, detaining 19 UN personnel including one foreign national.

=== September ===
- 7 September – Multiple undersea cable cuts in the Red Sea disrupt internet across Asia and the Middle East; Yemen’s internationally-recognized government blames the Houthis, who deny involvement.
- 10 September – Israel carries out airstrikes on Houthi targets in Sanaa and Al Jawf Governorate, killing 46 people and injuring 165 others.
- 16 September – Israel carries out airstrikes on Houthi targets in Hodeida.
- 25 September – Israel carries out airstrikes on Houthi targets in Sanaa, killing eight people.
- 29 September – A Filipino sailor is killed in an attack by the Houthis on the Dutch cargo vessel Minervagracht in the Gulf of Aden.

=== October ===
- 7 October – Nine UN staff are detained by the Houthis.
- 18 October – Two sailors are killed following a fire on the Cameroonian-flagged cargo vessel Falcon in the Gulf of Aden.
- 19 October – Twenty UN staff are detained by the Houthis in Sanaa.
- 24 October – Two UN staff are detained by the Houthis in Sanaa.
- 25 October – The Houthis release actress Entisar al-Hammadi, who had been imprisoned since 2021 on charges of drug possession and indecency.

=== November ===
- 22 November – The Houthi-controlled Specialized Criminal Court in Sanaa sentences 17 people to death on charges of Israeli, Saudi and western intelligence.
- 24 November – Five security officers and two gunmen are killed in an attack on the motorcade of Nabil Shamsan, the governor of Taiz Governorate.

=== December ===
- 3 December – The Houthis release nine Filipino sailors held captive following the group's attack on the cargo vessel Eternity C in July and turn them over to the custody of Oman.
- 5 December — A bulk carrier is attacked by suspected pirates along the Bab-el-Mandeb.
- 8 December — 2025–2026 Southern Yemen campaign: The Southern Transitional Council claims that had taken control over eight provinces of southern Yemen, including Aden, following a military operation called "Promising Future".
- 18 December — The Houthis arrest 10 Yemeni employees of the UN.
- 23 December – In an agreement mediated by the UN Office of the Special Envoy of the Secretary-General for Yemen and the International Committee of the Red Cross, the Presidential Leadership Council and the Houthis release a joint 2,900 detainees held throughout the civil war.
- 26 December – 2025–2026 Southern Yemen campaign: The Royal Saudi Air Force carries out airstrikes against separatist targets in Hadhramaut Governorate.
- 30 December – 2025–2026 Southern Yemen campaign: The Royal Saudi Air Force carries out airstrikes on a weapons shipment from the UAE destined for southern separatist forces in Mukalla. After an ultimatum from Saudi Arabia and the Presidential Leadership Council, the UAE announces that it would withdraw its remaining security personnel from Yemen.

== Art and entertainment ==
- List of Yemeni submissions for the Academy Award for Best International Feature Film

== Holidays ==
- 30 March – 1 April – Eid al-Fitr
- 1 May – Labour Day
- 22 May – Unity Day
- 5–9 June – Eid al-Adha
- 26 June – Islamic New Year
- 4 September – Milad un-Nabi
- 26 September – Revolution Day
- 14 October – Liberation Day
- 30 November – Independence Day

== Deaths ==
- 28 August
  - Ahmed al-Rahawi, prime minister of the Houthi-led government (since 2024)
  - Jamal Amer, journalist and politician, minister of foreign affairs of the Houthi-led government (since 2024), airstrike.
- 16 October – Muhammad Abd al-Karim al-Ghamari, chief of staff of the Houthi-aligned faction of the Yemeni Armed Forces (since 2016).
