= 2021 in Yemen =

- Decades: 2000s; 2010s; 2020s
- See also: Other events of 2021: History of Yemen; Timeline; Years

Events in the year 2021 in Yemen.

== Incumbents ==
Photo	Post	Name
	President of Yemen	Abdrabbuh Mansur Hadi
	Prime Minister of Yemen	Maeen Abdulmalik Saeed

== Events ==
Ongoing — COVID-19 pandemic in Yemen — The Houthi–Saudi Arabian conflict (since 2015) — The Yemeni Civil War (2014–present)

- 22 February – Starting of the Battle of Marib.
- 25 February – Adoption of the United Nations Security Council Resolution 2564, calling for sanctions in Yemen.

== Deaths ==
- 27 March – Amin al-Waeli, major general (born 1962).
- 10 May – Sami Hasan Al Nash, football manager (born 1957).
- 13 May – Muhammed Ahmed Mansour, writer, poet and songwriter (born 1930).
- 24 May – Najeeb Qahtan al-Shaabi, politician.
- 25 May – Abdul Wahab Al-Dailami, politician, minister of justice (born 1938).
- 12 July – Mohammed bin Ismail Al Amrani, judge (born 1921).
- 28 September – Nasser al-Awlaki, politician, minister of agriculture (born 1946).
- 9 November – Rasha al-Harazi, journalist (born 1996).
- 3 December – Nasser al-Dhaibani, major general (born 1968).
