= 2026 in Yemen =

- Decades: 2000s; 2010s; 2020s
- See also: Other events of 2026: History of Yemen; Timeline; Years

Events in the year 2026 in Yemen.

== Incumbents ==
Aden government (Presidential Leadership Council)

Photo	Post	Name
	Chairman of Presidential Leadership Council	Rashad al-Alimi
	Prime Minister of Yemen	Salem Saleh bin Braik (until 15 January)
	Prime Minister of Yemen	Shaya al-Zindani (since 15 January)

Sanaa government (Supreme Political Council)

Photo	Post	Name
	Leader of Ansar Allah	Abdul-Malik al-Houthi
	Chairman of the Supreme Political Council	Mahdi al-Mashat
	Prime Minister of Yemen	Muhammad Ahmed Miftah

== Events ==
For events related to the civil war, see Timeline of the Yemeni civil war (2014–present)

=== January ===
- 2 January –
  - 2025–2026 Southern Yemen campaign: The Yemeni government, backed by Saudi Arabia, launches a military operation to recapture parts of Hadhramaut Governorate from the UAE-backed Southern Transitional Council (STC).
  - 2025–2026 Southern Yemen campaign: The Royal Saudi Air Force carries out multiple airstrikes on a camp belonging to the STC in Al-Khasah, Hadhramaut Governorate, killing seven people.
- 7 January – 2025–2026 Southern Yemen campaign: STC chairman Aidarus al-Zoubaidi is expelled from the Presidential Leadership Council (PLC) after failing to attend peace negotiations in Saudi Arabia.
- 9 January – 2025–2026 Southern Yemen campaign: STC secretary-general Abdulrahman Jalal al-Subaihi announces the group's dissolution following negotiations in Saudi Arabia. However, the dissolution is denied by the STC's spokesperson, Anwar al-Tamimi, who is based in the UAE.
- 10 January – 2025–2026 Southern Yemen campaign: The PLC announces that it had retaken full control of areas previously held by the STC.
- 15 January – The PLC appoints foreign minister Shaya al-Zindani as prime minister.
- 21 January – Five people are killed in a car bombing in Ja’awla, north of Aden targeting a convoy carrying Hamdi Shukri, a commander of the Southern Giants Brigades.
- 29 January –
  - Famine in Yemen: The World Food Programme ceases operations in Houthi-controlled territories following harassment from the Houthis.
  - The Houthis seize equipment and vehicles from six United Nations offices in Sanaa.

=== February ===
- 6 February – The PLC appoints a new cabinet under prime minister Zindani.
- 11 February – Protesters linked to the STC attack a government building in Ataq, leaving five people dead.
- 19 February – Protesters linked to the STC attempt to storm the gate of the Al-Maashiq Palace in Aden, leaving one person dead and 11 others injured.

=== March ===
- 6 March – Demonstrators in Sanaa rally in solitary with Iran and Lebanon amidst the conflict.
- 28 March – The Houthis join the 2026 Iran war, conducting a ballistic missile attack towards Israel and triggering air raid sirens in Beersheba.

=== May ===
- 14 May – The Houthis and the PLC agree to release 1,680 detainees as part of a prisoner exchange.
- 17 May – The Houthi-controlled Specialized Criminal Court in Sanaa sentences 19 people to death for collaborating with the Saudi-led coalition.

=== June ===
- 11 June – Twelve soldiers are killed in an explosion at a military base run by the Southern Giants Brigades in Aden.

=== July ===
- 4 July – Houthis kill 16 soldiers belonging to the internationally-recognised government in an attack in Hays district. Pro-government soldiers reportedly kill 50 Houthi fighters.
- 13 July – The defense ministry announces that it struck Sanaa International Airport's runway to ‌prevent an Iranian aircraft from landing. The Houthis accuse Saudi Arabia of conducting the attack. The Houthis later fire missiles towards Abha International Airport in Saudi Arabia.
- 20 July – The Houthis declare a blockade of Saudi Arabian ports and ships in the Bab-el-Mandeb.
- 24 July – Saudi Arabia carries out attacks on Hudaydah Port and facilities owned by the state telecommunications corporation in Hodeidah and Kamaran.
- 25 July – The Yemeni Air Force conducts strikes on Houthi missile and drone firing sites in Marib and Al-Jawf Governorate.

=== August ===
- 6 August – At least 58 government soldiers are killed in Houthi attacks. Saudi Arabia later says that a Houthi missile attack in Najran Province injured 11 civilians.
- 7 August – Eight soldiers are killed and 12 others are injured in a Houthi attack in Marib Governorate. The government states that a Houthi attack on Marib killed two civilians.

=== September ===
- 3 September –
  - The Houthis launch a general offensive in coastal regions for control of the Bab-el-Mandeb, resulting in significant losses for its forces as well as government forces.
  - A campaign to tighten the Siege of Taiz is started by Houthi forces.
- 6 September – Government forces state that they retook Hays district.
- 8 September –
  - The Houthis launch missile and drone attacks on civilian, economic and military facilities in Abha, Jizan, Najran and Khamis Mushait, wounding 73 people, including women and children, and igniting fires at oil facilities and utilities in southern Saudi Arabia.
  - Government forces launch a counteroffensive against the Houthis, with the goal of recapturing Sanaa.
- 10 September – The Houthis recapture Mokha.
- 11 September –
  - The Houthis complete their takeover of the Bab el-Mandeb region by recapturing Perim Island, opening a new front in the 2026 Iran war.
  - The Houthis complete their seizure of the entire Red Sea coast by recapturing the Hanish Islands.
- 16 September – The Houthis state that they downed a Saudi F15 over Marib Governorate.
- 17 September –
  - Al-Masirah reports that Saudi attacks targeted three telecommunications towers in Taiz Governorate, while one civilian was killed and another wounded in attacks on Abs.
  - Al-Masirah reports that government attacks in Taiz Governorate killed three children and wounded several others.
- 22 September – Saba News Agency announces that six civilians, including two children and a woman, were killed and eight others, including a child and a woman were wounded in Saudi attacks in Mokha.
- 23 September – Government soldiers claim that they captured Mount Qarfan in Taiz Governorate.
- 24 September – The government claims to have thwarted a Houthi attack on a vital supply route to Aden.
- 25 September – President Rashad al-Alimi calles on Yemenis to join the armed forces against the Houthis and promises a general amnesty for Houthi fighters and affiliates who leave the group beginning the next day.
- 27 September – The Houthi-run health ministry states that an attack on a market in the Mawiya junction of Taiz Governorate killed seven people and wounded 40 others, including children. The government states that its targets were a Houthi military camp and vehicles at the same area.

=== October ===
- 1 October – Houthi media declares that the Saudi Arabian Armed Forces struck Sanaa for the first time in years.
- 2 October –
  - The Saba News Agency reports Saudi attacks in Sanaa.
  - The Yemeni Air Force announces that it conducted 20 strikes on Houthi targets in Taiz Governorate.
  - The Houthis state that Saudi Arabia conducted 94 attacks in parts of Yemen under their governance in the last day.
- 3 October – Al-Masirah announces that Saudi Arabia conducted 24 attacks on Sanaa. Government forces state that they struck "legitimate vital military targets in Sanaa”.
- 4 October – The head of the internationally recognized Presidential Leadership Council (PLC), Rashad al-Alimi, formally announces the start of a full-scale military counteroffensive from Saudi Arabia to reclaiming all remaining Houthi-controlled territories. The Saudi-led coalition promises to back the offensive.
- 5 October –
  - Government troops successfully cut off Houthi supply routes and retake Dhubab, including its airport.
  - Government forces completely re-secure the Bab al-Mandab Strait and recapture Mokha, encircling hundreds of remaining Houthi fighters.
- 7 October – Switzerland pledges about $2 million for humanitarian aid in Yemen.
- 16 October –
  - Houthi rebels attack the Al-Maashiq Palace complex in Aden, the temporary capital of the internationally recognized government using drones and missiles. Five people, including members of Prime Minister Shaya al-Zindani's security detail, are killed and sixteen others are injured in the attack.
  - The Houthi-run health ministry states that an 8-year-old child and two 10-year-old children were killed, while more than a dozen people were injured in an attack that hit homes in al-Ar, Dawran Aness district, which was blamed on Saudi Arabia.
- 17 October – 159 pro-government fighters are released by the Houthis as part of an amnesty.
- 18 October – The Saba News Agency reports that an alleged Saudi strike hit a house in Saada Governorate, killing at least nine individuals and injuring 16 others, mostly children and women.
- 19 October – At least 73 recruits are killed and over 200 others are injured when Houthi forces fired three ballistic missiles at the al-Alam military training camp in Shabwa Governorate.
- 24 October – The Houthis announce that a Saudi strike on a home in Hiba, Al-Misrakh district, killed four family members, including children and women.
- 28 October –
  - Al-Masirah reports that a Saudi attack hit a petrol station in Al Hazm, killing 12 people and injuring 10 others, including children and women.
  - The Houthi health ministry states that a Saudi strike in Al-Barah, Maqbanah district killed 13 people and seriously wounded three others.

=== November ===
- 1 November –
  - The Office of the United Nations High Commissioner for Human Rights announces that a Yemeni staff member died in Houthi custody.
  - The Houthis blame Saudi Arabia for two strikes on Hodeidah University's medical school.
- 3 November – The government accuses the Quds Force and Hezbollah of tasking 21 foreign experts to direct the Houthis' war effort.
- 4 November – The Yemen Red Crescent Society distributes crucial medical supplies to Taiz.
- 5 November – The Houthi-run Health Ministry announces that seven people were killed and six were wounded in two Saudi strikes.
- 6 November – The Houthis' health ministry states that a Saudi strike hit a vegetable market in Al-Wazi'iyah district, killing at least 30 people and wounded eight others, however local authorities deny this and blame the strikes on the Houthis.
- 7 November – The Houthi health ministry reports that 44 people, most of them children and women were killed and 40 others, including nine women and eight children were injured in Saudi strikes in Bani Hushaysh district, alleging that the strikes had targeted responding paramedics.
- 14 November – The United Nations Security Council unanimously decides to extend sanctions relating to Yemen for one more year, including freezing assets and enforcing travel bans.
- 15 November –
  - The Houthi strikes in Taiz governorate reportedly kills a woman and injures eight others, including four children.
  - Government-aligned forces withdraw from positions near the Bab-el-Mandeb Strait to defend Aden after Houthi fighters cut off a coastal supply route.
  - The Houthis release 600 pro-government soldiers captured since July, marking the largest unilateral prisoner release of the civil war according to the International Committee of the Red Cross.
- 16 November – The House of Representatives unanimously passes a law to classify the Houthis as a terrorist organization and ban their financing.
- 20 November – The Saudi-led coalition claims to have attacked Houthi targets at Hodeidah Port.
- 22 November – Houthi authorities state that six employees are injured in an airstrike on a state-owned oil company building and fuel station in Sanaa.

== Art and entertainment ==
- List of Yemeni submissions for the Academy Award for Best International Feature Film

== Holidays ==
- 18–22 March – Eid al-Fitr
- 1 May – Labour Day
- 22 May – Unity Day
- 26–30 May – Eid al-Adha
- 16 June – Islamic New Year
- 25 August – Milad un-Nabi
- 26 September – Revolution Day
- 14 October – Liberation Day
- 30 November – Independence Day

== Deaths ==
- 17 January – Ali Salem al-Beidh, 86, vice president (1990–1994).
- 28 May – Abdrabbuh Mansour Hadi, 80, president (2012–2022), vice president (1994–2012), and minister of defense (1994).
- 1 September – Abu Hudhayfah al-Ansari, Islamic militant, 41, spokesman of the Islamic State (since 2023).
