= 2020 in Yemen =

- Decades: 2000s; 2010s; 2020s
- See also: Other events of 2020: History of Yemen; Timeline; Years

Events of 2020 in Yemen.

== Incumbents ==
- President: Abdrabbuh Mansur Hadi
- Vice President of Yemen: Yemeni Army general Ali Mohsen al-Ahmar
- Prime Minister: Maeen Abdulmalik Saeed

== Events ==
=== January ===
- January 1
  - Yemeni rebels release some Saudi prisoners, as UN-led peace talks make progress.
- January 7
  - Houthi rebels shot down a drone belonging to the Saudi-led coalition, in the northeastern province of Jawf.
- January 8
  - Saudi Arabia begins efforts to rebuild power stations in Yemen.
- January 18
  - 2020 Ma'rib attack - A missile attack on a military camp near Ma'rib kills 111 Yemeni soldiers. No group claimed responsibility.
- January 29 - Qasim al-Raymi, Emir of al-Qaeda in the Arabian Peninsula (b. 1978).
- 31 January
  - Houthi armed forces spokesman Gen. Yahya Sarea announced that Houthi forces managed to liberate roughly 2,500 km^{2} of territory including the city of Naham, and parts of the governorates of Al-Jawf and Marib, from Saudi-led forces. The coalition forces immediately denied this claim, claiming victory and progress in these areas.“In the Nahm district, east of the capital Sanaa, the National Army managed to regain control of a number of Houthi-controlled areas,” Majli said.

=== February ===
- 15 February
  - a Saudi fighter jet crashed in Yemen and the Houthi rebels claimed responsibility for the attack. The next day, the Saudi-led coalition launched airstrikes, targeting Yemen's northern Al-Jawf province and killed 31 civilians.

=== March ===
- 1 March
  - Houthi forces captured the city of Al Hazm, the capital of Al-Jawf province during the 2020 al-Jawf offensive.
- 30 March
  - the Saudi-led coalition carried out an airstrike on the Yemeni capital, Sanaa. The attacks came despite the UN Secretary-General António Guterres and other organizations asking to maintain ceasefire amidst the COVID-19 pandemic. In their statement, a group of regional experts also said that all political prisoners should be released from prisons to tackle with the appalling health care system, and stop the COVID-19 pandemic from spreading in Yemen.

=== April ===
- 5 April
  - at least 5 women were killed and 28 people injured when shelling hit the woman's section of Taiz's main prison. The shelling came from the part of the divided city controlled by the Houthis.
- 10 April
  - The first case of COVID-19 in Yemen arrived to a patient living in Ash Shihr in Hadhramaut.
- 26 April
  - The Southern Transitional Council declared autonomous rule.

=== May ===
- 26 May
  - Houthi fighters attacked a military base in Marib Governorate, killing seven people.
- 28 May
  - United Nations agencies and other international humanitarian partners launch a US$2.41 billion appeal for addition funds to fight the spread of COVID-19 in Yemen.

=== June ===
- 21 June
  - The Southern Transitional Council seized control of the island of Socotra.

=== July ===
- 15 July
  - The United Nations warned that the FSO Safer could spill four times as much oil as the Exxon Valdez oil spill.

=== August ===
- A series of flash floods killed 172 people across Yemen and damaged UNESCO world heritage sites throughout the country.

=== December ===
- 4 December
  - At least 8 people were killed in an attack on an industrial compound in Al Hudaydah.
- 30 December
  - At least 20 were killed in the attack in Aden Airport after the new government arrived.

== Deaths ==
- 29 January – Qasim al-Raymi, Emir of al-Qaeda in the Arabian Peninsula (b. 1978).
- 2 October – Shaher Abdulhak, Yemeni billionaire businessman (b. 1938).

== See also ==
- Yemen
- Economy of Yemen
- History of Yemen
- Outline of Yemen

=== Yemen government ===
- Politics of Yemen

==== Executive branch ====
- President of Yemen
- Prime Minister of Yemen
- Imams of Yemen
- List of heads of state of Yemen
- List of heads of government of Yemen

==== Legislative ====
- House of Representatives (Yemen)
- List of speakers of the House of Representatives of Yemen
- List of legislatures by country

==== Political groups ====
- Southern Transitional Council

=== Yemen conflicts ===
- Yemen War
- Houthi insurgency in Yemen (2004–2015)
- South Yemen insurgency (2009–2015)
- Yemeni Civil War (2015–present)
  - Saudi Arabian-led intervention in Yemen (2015–present)
  - Saudi–Yemeni border conflict (2015–present)

=== Other ===
- 2016–2021 Yemen cholera outbreak
- COVID-19 pandemic in Yemen
