= 2023 in Yemen =

- Decades: 2000s; 2010s; 2020s
- See also: Other events of 2023: History of Yemen; Timeline; Years

Events in the year 2023 in Yemen.

== Incumbents ==
Aden government

Photo	Post	Name
	Chairman of Presidential Leadership Council	Rashad al-Alimi
	Prime Minister of Yemen	Maeen Abdulmalik Saeed

Sanaa government

Photo	Post	Name
	Leader of Ansar Allah	Abdul-Malik al-Houthi
	Chairman of the Supreme Revolutionary Committee	Mohammed al-Houthi
	Chairman of the Supreme Political Council	Mahdi al-Mashat
	Prime Minister of Yemen	Abdel-Aziz bin Habtour

== Events ==
Ongoing — COVID-19 pandemic in Yemen — The Houthi–Saudi Arabian conflict (since 2015) — The Yemeni Civil War (2014–present) - Houthi involvement in the 2023 Israel–Hamas war

- 21 January – Six people are injured after a bomb explodes in al-Majaza, Shabwah Governorate.
- 21 March – Ten Yemeni soldiers are killed by Houthi Islamists in Harib District, Marib Governorate, despite a truce reached between the government and the rebels on Monday.
- 28 March – Six Houthis and five Yemeni soldiers are killed during clashes in government-controlled Lahj Governorate.
- 14 April – A major prisoner swap begins between rival factions in Yemen as a first flight between Houthi-controlled Sanaa and government-controlled Aden saw nearly 900 prisoners freed.
- 19 October – In the Red Sea, the United States Navy destroyer USS Carney uses SM-2 missiles to shoot down three cruise missiles and eight drones launched by Houthi forces in Yemen. The Pentagon says that the missiles and drones were "potentially headed towards Israel".
- 8 November – A United States Air Force MQ-9 Reaper is shot down in international airspace off the coast of Yemen. The Iran-backed Houthis claim responsibility for the shooting.
- 19 November –
  - The Houthi movement hijacks a British cargo ship operated by a Japanese company and partially owned by an Israeli businessman in the Red Sea. 25 people are on board from different nationalities, including Ukrainians, Bulgarians, Filipinos, and Mexicans.
  - On the group's Telegram channel, Houthi spokesman Yahya Saree declares their intention to target ships owned or operated by Israeli companies, or carrying the Israeli flag.
- 10 December – French Navy frigate Languedoc shoots down two drones over the Red Sea that were launched from Yemen, according to the French Armed Forces Ministry.
- 14 December – Maersk calls for "political action" after a ballistic missile launched by the Houthis in Yemen narrowly misses one of their container ships in the Bab-el-Mandeb strait. An unknown vessel claiming to be from the Yemeni Navy also ordered the ship to sail towards the Yemeni coast.
- 15 December –
  - Two Liberian-flagged vessels in the Bab-el-Mandeb strait are attacked with drones and ballistic missiles launched by Houthi militants in Yemen, causing a fire on one of the ships. No injuries are reported.
  - Shipping firms Hapag-Lloyd and Maersk announce a suspension of all container shipments through the Red Sea until further notice amid Houthi attacks on commercial vessels.
- 16 December – The Royal Navy's HMS Diamond shoots down a drone launched from Houthi-controlled territory in Yemen over the Red Sea using a Sea Viper missile.
- 18 December –
  - A Norwegian-owned tanker en route to Réunion, M/V Swan Atlantic, is attacked in the Red Sea with the owner of the ship saying that the ship was hit by an "unidentified object" that struck its port side causing a small fire but no injuries.
  - British multinational oil and gas company BP suspends all shipments through the Red Sea in response to an increase in Houthi attacks on commercial vessels.
  - U.S. Defense Secretary Lloyd Austin announces a coalition of ten nations, called Operation Prosperity Guardian, to enforce security in the Red Sea and Gulf of Aden amid Houthi attacks.
- 21 December – At least 10 more nations, including Australia and Greece, join the United States-led Operation Prosperity Guardian task force to counter Houthi attacks in the Red Sea.
- 23 December – United Nations Special Envoy for Yemen Hans Grundberg announces that the conflicting parties agree to a new ceasefire and to participate in a UN-led peace process.
- 31 December – Ten Houthi militants are killed during an engagement between four Houthi boats and United States Navy helicopters defending the cargo ship Maersk Hangzhou in the Red Sea.

== Deaths ==
- 6 January – Sadiq al-Ahmar, 66, Yemeni politician and tribal leader, MP (1993–2011), cancer.
- 10 August – Abdullatif Al-Sayed, 50–51, Yemeni military officer, roadside blast.
