= 2022 in Yemen =

- Decades: 2000s; 2010s; 2020s
- See also: Other events of 2022: History of Yemen; Timeline; Years

Events in the year 2022 in Yemen

== Incumbents ==
Photo	Post	Name
	Head of Presidential Leadership Council	Rashad al-Alimi
	Prime Minister of Yemen	Maeen Abdulmalik Saeed

== Events ==
Ongoing — COVID-19 pandemic in Yemen — The Houthi–Saudi Arabian conflict (since 2015) — The Yemeni Civil War (2014–present)

- 2 January – The Houthis detain the crew of the vessel Rawabee, including nationals from India, Ethiopia, Indonesia, Myanmar, and the Philippines.
- 3 January – The Houthis seize a UAE cargo ship off Hodeidah, claiming it carried weapons; Saudi Arabia said it held hospital equipment.
- 17 January – Houthi forces attack Abu Dhabi and Dubai with missiles and drones, killing three; the UAE and the U.S. condemn the strike.
- 20 January – A coalition airstrike hits a Hodeidah telecommunication building, killing five civilians and causing a near-total internet blackout.
- 21 January – Saudi airstrike on a prison in Saada kills at least 87 people and injures more than 200 others.
- 5 March – Houthi authorities sign a memorandum with the UN to prevent the potential explosion of the FSO Safer supertanker.
- 26 March – A Saudi-led airstrike hits two houses in Sanaa.
- 1 April – UN envoy Hans Grundberg announces a two-month truce in Yemen starting the next day, halting military operations, allowing fuel shipments, reopening Sana’a airport flights, and facilitating road access in Taiz.
- 7 April – President Abdrabbuh Mansur Hadi stepped down and transferred powers to the Presidential Leadership Council
- 18 April – The Houthis sign a UN Action Plan to end child recruitment and protect children, schools, and hospitals, coinciding with the start of the nationwide truce.
- 28 April – Clashes in the Al Jawf governorate resume between Houthis and local tribes over black market control of oil trucks.
- 16 May – Yemen Airways operates its first commercial flight from Sanaa since 2016 under the U.N.-brokered truce.
- 23 July – The Houthis shell a residential neighborhood in Taizz, killing one child and wounding 11 others.
- 26 July – Hundreds protest in Taizz against the Houthi authorities’ refusal to open the main roads.
- 6 August – The Southern Transitional Council security forces detain journalist Ahmed Maher in Aden.
- 6 September – At least 26 people were killed on Tuesday when Al-Qaeda militants attacked a military outpost managed by Yemeni security forces in the southern province of Abyan.
- 2 October – The truce between the Houthis and the coalition ends, as both parties fail to renew a ceasefire.

== Deaths ==
- Ahmad Daifallah Al-Azeib, diplomat
- Abdullah Al-Kibsi, politician
