= 2016 in Yemen =

- Decades: 1990s; 2000s; 2010s; 2020s
- See also: Other events of 2016: History of Yemen; Timeline; Years

The following lists events that will happen in 2016 in Yemen.

== Incumbents ==
- President: Abdrabbuh Mansur Hadi
- Vice President: Khaled Bahah (until 3 April), Ali Mohsen al-Ahmar (starting 3 April)
- Prime Minister: Khaled Bahah (until 3 April), Ahmed Obeid bin Daghr (starting 3 April)

== Events ==
=== January ===
13 January – Unidentified assailants arrived on motorcycles to Sheikh Othman roundabout in Aden and shot and killed two traffic policemen. Islamist extremists are suspected.

14 January – Unidentified militants planted an explosive device on a police car in Aden, killing two and wounding another. Islamists such as Islamic State or Al-Qaeda are suspected.

17 January – A suicide bomber detonated his explosives while within a car, on the entrance of the residence of Aden police chief, General Shalal Shaea. Shaea survived the attack while eight civilians and two guards were killed. No group claimed responsibility, but Al-Qaeda in the Arabian Peninsula is suspected.

28 January – At least seven people are killed in a suicide bomb attack near the presidential palace in Aden, Yemen. The Islamic State claims it was behind the attack.

29 January – A suicide car bomber struck a checkpoint in the southern Yemen city of Aden, killing seven and wounding another eight. Islamic State affiliate in Yemen claimed responsibility for the attack.

=== August ===
9 August – At least 14 people are killed after Saudi-led coalition airstrikes hit a food factory in Yemen's capital Sana'a. The airstrikes come just days after the suspension of inconclusive peace talks in Kuwait.

13 August – At least 10 children are killed and 28 injured in an air attack on a school in northern Yemen. The Houthi group claims that the Saudi Arabia led coalition is responsible.

14 August – About 40 suspected Al-Qaeda in the Arabian Peninsula fighters are killed as Yemeni forces, aided by Saudi-led airstrikes, fight their way into Zinjibar and Jaʿār in eastern Yemen.

15 August – An air strike by the Saudi-led coalition which hit a hospital in northern Yemen run by Médecins Sans Frontières (Doctors Without Borders) kills at least 11 people.

16 August – Nine Yemenis from one family die from an airstrike by the Saudi-led alliance.

== Deaths ==
- 22 February – Abd Rabbo Hussein, Yemeni Army general
