= 2019 in Yemen =

- Decades: 1990s; 2000s; 2010s; 2020s
- See also: Other events of 2019: History of Yemen; Timeline; Years

Events of 2019 in Yemen.

== Incumbents ==
- President: Abdrabbuh Mansur Hadi
- Vice President: Ali Mohsen al-Ahmar
- Prime Minister: Maeen Abdulmalik Saeed

== Events ==
- 26 March: A hospital in a rural area of northwest Yemen was hit by an airstrike Tuesday killing seven people and wounding eight others, Save the Children said.
- 29 August: the Southern Transitional Council take control of Aden and Zinjibar.

== Deaths ==
- 1 January – Jamal Ahmad Mohammad Al Badawi, militant.
- 27 March – Abdul Latif Dayfallah, military officer and politician (b. 1930).
- 1 August – Munir Al Yafi, military commander (b. 1974).
