= 2018 in Yemen =

- Decades: 1990s; 2000s; 2010s; 2020s
- See also: Other events of 2018: History of Yemen; Timeline; Years

Events in the year 2018 in Yemen.

== Incumbents ==
- President: Abdrabbuh Mansur Hadi
- Vice President: Ali Mohsen al-Ahmar
- Prime Minister:
  - Ahmed Obeid bin Daghr ( 4 April 2016 – 15 October 2018 )
  - Maeen Abdulmalik Saeed (18 October 2018 - )

== Events ==
- Ongoing since April 2015 – Battle of Taiz
- 28 to 31 January – Battle of Aden
- 26 March – The Houthis launch a barrage of rockets at Saudi Arabia, killing an Egyptian man and leaving two others wounded in Riyadh.
- 22 April – An airstrike occurs in Hajjah Governorate. The attack left between 33, 43 and 55 deaths.
- 3 May - The United Arab Emirates deployed over 100 soldiers to the island of Socotra in an unofficial military deployment, dismissed Yemeni personnel, and took administrative control of Socotra Airport and seaport.
- 3 July - 46 detainees are released from the Beir Ahmed prison, following reporting by the Associated Press about torture and abuse occurring there.
- 9 August - A Saudi airstrike hit a bus in the Dahyan air strike, Sa'dah, reportedly killing dozens of children.
- 1 September - Saudi Arabia and the United Arab Emirates say that the bombing of a school bus in Yemen by Saudi Arabian aircraft, which killed 51 people, was "unjustified".
- 3 December - A flight chartered by the United Nations evacuated 50 wounded Houthi fighters to Muscat, Oman for medical treatment, as part of the peace talks.

== Deaths ==
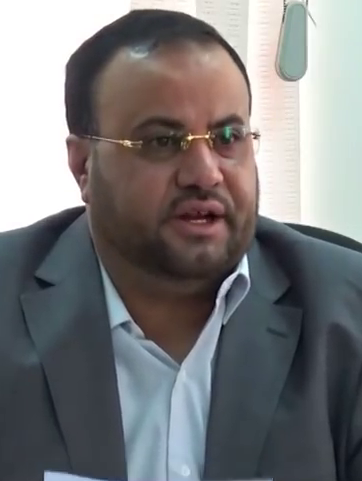
Saleh Ali al-Sammad

- 17 February – Abdul Salam al-Haddad, diplomat, Ambassador to Germany, Kuwait and Ethiopia.
- 19 April – Saleh Ali al-Sammad, de facto President of Yemen (b. 1979)
