= 2015 in Yemen =

- Decades: 1990s; 2000s; 2010s; 2020s
- See also: Other events of 2015: History of Yemen; Timeline; Years

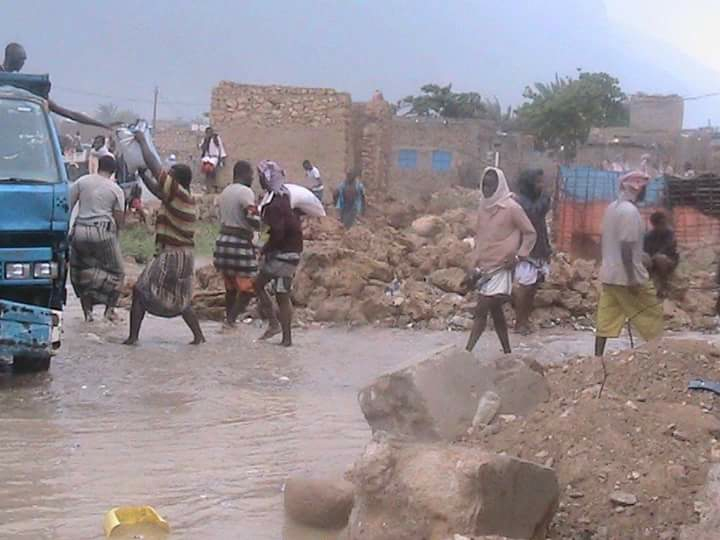
2015 flood

The following lists events that happened in 2015 in Yemen.

== Incumbents ==
- President:
  - Abd Rabbuh Mansur Hadi (until January 22)
  - Mohammed Ali al-Houthi (from February 6)
- Vice President: Khaled Bahah (starting 13 April)
- Prime Minister: Khaled Bahah
- General:
  - Ali Mohsen Saleh al-Ahmar

== Events ==
=== January ===
- January 1 - The death toll of the suicide bombing in Ibb that occurred on December 31 rises to 49 with the injury count rising to 70.
- January 4 - A bombing at a local Houthi movement headquarters in Dhamar Governorate kills five people and wounds 25.
- January 7 - A car bomb explodes outside a police college in Sana'a with at least 38 people reported dead and more than 50 wounded.
- January 17 - Gunmen abduct the chief of staff to Yemen's president in the center of the capital, Sana'a. It is uncertain if Shiite Houthi rebels or al-Qaeda militants kidnapped Ahmed Awad bin Mubarak.
- January 19 - Houthi insurgency in Yemen
  - Clashes in Sana'a leave at least nine dead and 67 injured.
  - Houthi rebels seize the official Saba News Agency and surround the residence of the Prime Minister.
- January 20 - Houthi rebels take over the residence of the President amidst calls by the rebel leader for negotiations to adjust the country's power structure.
- January 22 - President Abdu Rabu Mansour Hadi, Prime Minister Khaled Bahah, and the Yemeni cabinet resign.
- January 29 - Houthi rebels seize a Yemeni military base south of the capital, Sana'a, where U.S. military advisers once trained Yemeni counterterrorism forces to fight al-Qaeda in the south of the country. The captured base was reportedly manned by forces loyal to former President Ali Abdullah Saleh.

=== February ===
- February 6 - Houthi rebels take control in Yemen and dissolve the parliament.
- February 12 - Fighters from the Al-Qaeda affiliated Ansar al-Sharia take control of an army base in southern Yemen.
- February 14 - The United Arab Emirates suspends its embassy operations in Yemen due to security concerns surrounding the recent Shiite Houthi rebel take over of the country.
- February 20 - The Houthis come to a preliminary agreement to form a new government in Yemen.
- February 24 - Abd Rabbuh Mansur Hadi withdraws his resignation as President of Yemen after escaping from the custody of the Houthis.

=== March ===
- March 20 - Islamic State claims responsibility for suicide bombings in Shiite mosques in Sana'a that killed 142 people.
- March 21 - The United States military evacuates the remaining 100 Special Operations forces members in the country due to the deteriorating security situation.
- March 25
  - President Abed Rabbo Mansour Hadi flees Yemen in a boat after Houthi rebels besiege the government's temporary capital of Aden in the southern part of the country.
  - The Gulf Cooperation Council announces its intervention in Yemen and Saudi Arabia begins launching airstrikes against Houthi forces and installations.
- March 26 - Saudi military intervention: Saudi Arabian warplanes launch airstrikes on Sana'a International Airport and Yemen's al Dulaimi military airport resulting in at least 17 deaths.
- March 27 - A Middle Eastern coalition led by the Saudi Arabian army and Egyptian navy attacks positions in Yemen for the second successive day, resulting in at least ten deaths in Saada Governorate. Saudi Arabia declares that it will enforce a "no-fly zone".
- March 28
  - Saudi military intervention: Saudi airstrikes continue in Yemen for the third successive day while ground fighting occurs in Aden. Saudi Arabia claims to be in full control of Yemen's airspace.
  - Saudi planes evacuate a United Nations mission from Sanaa.
- March 29 - Pakistan sends a Boeing 747 to evacuate Pakistani nationals concerned about their security.
- March 30
  - The People's Republic of China evacuates its citizens from Yemen due to concerns over declining security and also suspends anti-piracy patrols in the Gulf of Aden.
  - Saudi-led airstrikes hit a refugee camp near a military installation in the northern district of Haradh killing 21 people. Houthis militants make gains in Hadi's last bastion, Aden.
- March 31 - India evacuated 348 of its citizens as part of a rescue operation by the Indian Navy, named Operation Raahat.

=== April ===
- April 2 - Al-Qaeda fighters attack a prison in Mukalla freeing at least 270 prisoners.

=== June ===
- 12 June - Al-Qaeda in the Arabian Peninsula Nasir al-Wuhayshi was killed in a US drone strike in Mukalla.

=== July ===
- 24 July - airstrikes targeted two residential complexes belonging to engineers and technicians of al-Mukha power plant of Taiz province.

=== September ===
- 4 September - a Houthi missile hit an ammunition dump at a military base in Ma'rib killing 45 UAE, 10 Saudi and 5 Bahraini soldiers.

=== December ===
- 14 December - the pro-Saleh Yemeni Army and Houthi militants carried out a strike with a Tochka ballistic missile against a military camp that was being used by troops of the Saudi-led coalition, south-west of the city of Taiz.

== Deaths ==
- 23 May – Ali Raymi, boxer and colonel (b.1973).
- 12 June – Nasir al-Wuhayshi, Emir of Al-Qaeda in the Arabian Peninsula (b.1976).
- 30 October – Abdullah al-Dafa'i, Yemeni politician (b. 1939).
