= 2017 in Yemen =

- Decades: 1990s; 2000s; 2010s; 2020s
- See also: Other events of 2017: History of Yemen; Timeline; Years

Events in the year 2017 in Yemen.

== Incumbents ==
- President: Abdrabbuh Mansur Hadi
- Vice President: Ali Mohsen al-Ahmar
- Prime Minister: Ahmed Obeid bin Daghr

== Events ==
- Ongoing – the Yemeni Crisis (2011–present)
- 25 June – The World Health Organization estimates that Yemen has more than 200,000 cases of Cholera.
- 14 August – The WHO suspects cholera cases in Yemen hit 500,000 mark.

== Deaths ==
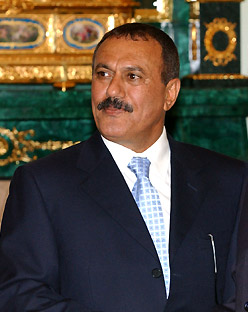
Ali Abdullah Saleh

- 14 August – Nearly 2000 people have died since the cholera outbreak began to spread rapidly at the end of April.
- 4 December – Ali Abdullah Saleh, politician, President of North Yemen 1978–1990 and President of Yemen 1990–2012 (b. 1947).
