= Mohammed bin Ismail Al Amrani =

Yemeni judge (1921–2021)

Personal life
- Born: 22 December 1921 Sanaa, Yemen
- Died: 12 July 2021 (aged 99)

Religious life
- Religion: Islam
- Denomination: Sunni
- Profession: Muslim Scholar; Mufti of Yemen

Mohammed bin Ismail Al Amrani (Arabic: محمد بن إسماعيل العمراني, Muḥammad b. Ismāʿīl al-ʿImrānī; 22 December 1921 – 12 July 2021) was a judge and senior Yemeni contemporary scholar. He was known by the name Judge Al Almrani; his family originated from the city of 'Amran in Yemen. His grandfather, a judge in Amran city, moved and settled in Sanaa (1139 e–1161Hijjri) 1117, the twelfth century of Mohammed's migration — he was the first from his family to be properly educated. Consequently, his descendants maintained the title Amrani since then, but never lived in Amran city.

== Biography ==
Judge Muhammad Ali Amrani's grandfather was a student and disciple of the most prominent Shaykh Al-Islam Judge Muhammad Ibn Ali Shawkaani, who has said about Al Amrani that he was the full moon (in Arabia full moon means bright). Judge Al Amrani excelled in all discretionary education/knowledge and became among the famous ones in the Arab region.

He was the Mufti of the Republic of Yemen. His advice extended to the Arab region. His fatwas have been issued in the newspapers, radio and TV for almost three decades. His most known fatwa was the inadmissibility of the jihad against the Houthis, despite the dissension between him and the Houthis. He was visited by many scholars within Yemen and the Arab world.

He was known as moderate Islamic scholar. He earned respect from both sectarians Zaidi and some of the fanatics (classified as the closest to Shiites and Sinis/Shafaie) and was followed by both. His famous fatwa: “not to consider the Shiites astray of Islam”. He was/is still known as moderate Judge in his approach.

His methodical approach is similar to the late famous scholar and judge Mohammed Ali Shawkaani in the end of the eighteenth century. He was his student and follower. The late judge Mohammed Ali Shawkaani was a famous judge in Imam's Ara. He was involved in politics and criticized Imam's approach, in which he was categorized as enemy of the system and was treacherously killed when he was preaching in Zabid/Yemen first university in the Arab region. Unfortunately, moderates sometimes get killed because of their intellectual independence.

== Marital status ==
He was married and had five sons and four daughters. All family members are highly educated, their majors varying in the areas of literature, politics and ideology, but no one followed the ancestors in the judiciary. Al Amrani was an open-minded person. He supported both daughters and sons to have equal opportunity of education.

== His students ==
He had many students such as: Mohamad al-Arefe.
