= Abdullah Al-Kibsi =

Yemeni politician and army officer (killed 2022)

Personal details
- Died: 1 September 2022; Sanaa, Yemen

Abdullah Mohammed Al-Kibsi (died 1 September 2022) was a Yemeni politician who served as the minister of culture.

== Life ==
Al-Kibsi served as a member of the parliament of Yemen and brigadier general in the military.

On 1 September 2022, he was murdered outside his house in Sana'a. The person who murdered him was arrested on 3 September 2022.
