= Al-Maashiq Palace =

Al-Ma’ashiq Palace
- قصر المعاشيق

General information
- Location: Aden, Yemen
- Coordinates: 12°45′52″N 45°03′15″E

Al-Ma’ashiq Palace is a palace in Aden, in Yemen, that has served as the seat and residence of the chairman of the Presidential Leadership Council, who is internationally recognized as head of state of the Republic of Yemen. The Palace is located on the waterfront in Aden, in the Crater District.

In December 2025, the PLC chairman reportedly vacated the palace indefinitely after Saudi forces guarding it withdrew amid the separatist Southern Transitional Council's 2025 Southern Yemen offensive.

== History ==
From 1970 to 1986, the palace was a presidential reception building in the People's Democratic Republic of Yemen, then in 1986, Ali Salem al-Beidh, Secretary-General of the Yemeni Socialist Party and president of South Yemen, decided to use it as a presidential palace.

After the unification of the country, the palace became the presidential palace. It became the residence of President Abdrabbuh Mansour Hadi after he left for Aden as part of the Yemeni civil war.

In April 2015, as part of the Battle of Aden, the Houthis occupied the palace, and eventually withdrew from it with the start of Operation Decisive Storm.

In October 2015, the palace was renovated, after suffering damage in the fighting.

In March 2021, protesters stormed the palace, driven by widespread public anger over inadequate services, poor living conditions, and the devaluation of Yemen’s currency. Reports indicated that the protest was sparked by the government’s failure to pay the salaries of retired soldiers. The protesters, reportedly members of the national guard who had not been paid for nine months, were peacefully dispersed shortly afterward, according to media accounts.

On 19 February 2026, protesters linked to the Southern Transitional Council attempted to storm the palace's gate, leaving one person dead and 11 others injured after security forces opened fire.

On 15 October 2026, the Houthis launched nine ballistic missiles and seven other projectiles at Aden and struck the presidential palace, killing five people and injuring 16 others.
