= Unity Day (Yemen) =

National holiday in Yemen

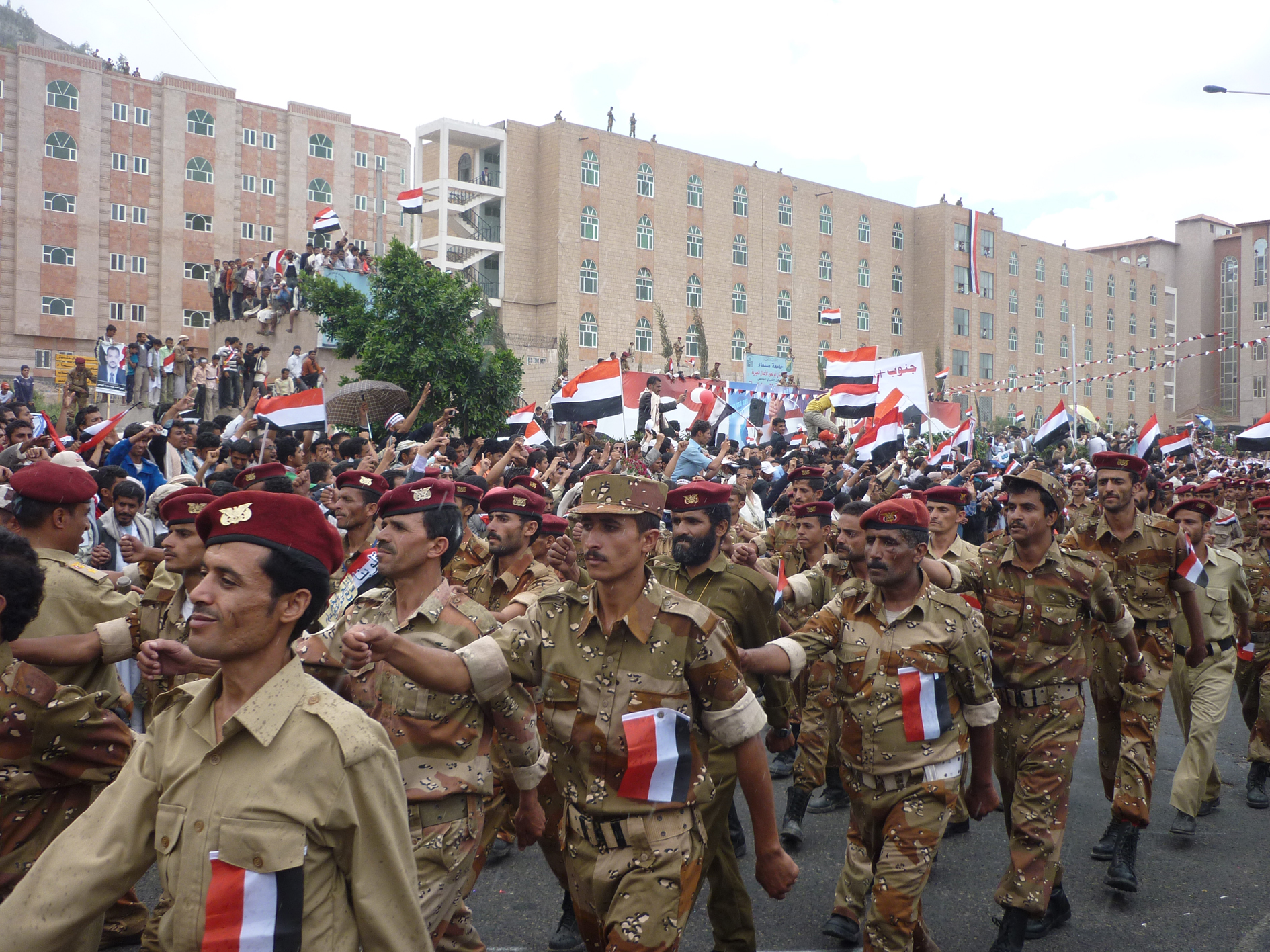
- Observed by: Yemen
- Celebrations: Flag hoisting, Parades, Award ceremonies, singing patriotic songs and the National anthem, Speeches by the President, entertainment and cultural programs
- Date: 22 May
- Next time: May 22, 2026
- Frequency: Annual
- Related to: Yemeni unification

Unity Day of Yemen (also called National Unity Day, National Day, Republic Day, National Day of the Republic of Yemen; Arabic: اليوم الوطني للجمهورية اليمنية) is a Yemeni national holiday held on 22 May. It commemorates the unification of North Yemen and South Yemen, which took place on this date in 1990. On this day, the president makes a speech broadcast on television and radio, and awards state decorations and orders to Yemeni citizens.

== History ==
Divided Yemen (1967–1990)

Before unification, Yemen was divided into two separate states for decades. North Yemen, based in Sana'a, was a republic after a revolution against the Kingdom of Yemen in 1962. South Yemen, with its capital in Aden, gained independence from Great Britain in 1967 and adopted the ideology of Marxism as part of the Eastern Bloc during the Cold War.

Tensions and conflicts between the two countries were frequent, culminating in the First Yemenite War with North Yemen supported by Saudi Arabia and South Yemen by the Soviet Union as well as the Second Yemenite War with North Yemen backed by Saudi Arabia and Taiwan. However, towards the end of the 1980s, geopolitical changes, such as the collapse of the Soviet Union, pushed both sides to seek a peaceful solution. Intensive negotiations resulted in the declaration of unity on 22 May 1990, with Sana'a as the interim capital, Ali Abdullah Saleh from the north becoming head of state, and Ali Salim al-Beidh from the south becoming head of government.

=== Post-unification ===
Since unification, Yemen has faced numerous conflicts, including the Yemeni Civil War (1994) and the humanitarian crisis resulting from the protracted war since 2014.

On 21 May 2012, a suicide bomber detonated an explosive belt among groups of Yemeni soldiers rehearsing for the annual Unity Day military parade in Sanaa, Yemen. An 18-year-old soldier recruited as a suicide bomber entered al-Sabeen Square in uniform and joined his Central Security Organization brigade midway through the rehearsal. As the soldiers were passing by the parade view stand, the bomber detonated his explosive belt. The attack, which unsuccessfully attempted to target Yemen's Defense Minister Mohammed Nasser Ahmed, killed at least 96 soldiers and wounded 222, making it one of the worst in Yemen's history. The bombing was claimed by al-Qaeda in the Arabian Peninsula affiliate Ansar al-Sharia.

== See also ==
- Southern Movement
- Unification Day (Bulgaria)
- German Unity Day
