= Rasha al-Harazi =

Yemeni journalist (1996–2021)

Rasha Abdullah al-Harazi (Arabic: رشا عبد الله الحرازي; October 1996 – 9 November 2021) was a Yemeni journalist and photographer.

== Early life and education ==
Rasha was born in 1996 in Hudeidah Governorate. She studied TV and radio at Hodeidah University. After graduation she worked for the Emirati news channels Al-Ain and Al-Sharq.

== Death ==
Rasha was assassinated on 9 November 2021 in Aden city by an explosion of a device planted on the car carrying her and her husband. Rasha was pregnant when she was murdered. Before her murder, she received many threats over her job as a journalist. No group claimed the responsibility, but her husband suspected the Houthi forces were behind the explosion.

The killing of Rasha al-Harazi was condemned by the Director-General of the UNESCO Audrey Azoulay in a press-release published on the 10th of November. According to global monitoring on the safety of journalists by the Observatory of Killed journalist, al-Harazi was the only media professional killed in Yemen in 2021.
