= Entisar al-Hammadi =

Yemeni model and actress

- إنتصار الحمادي
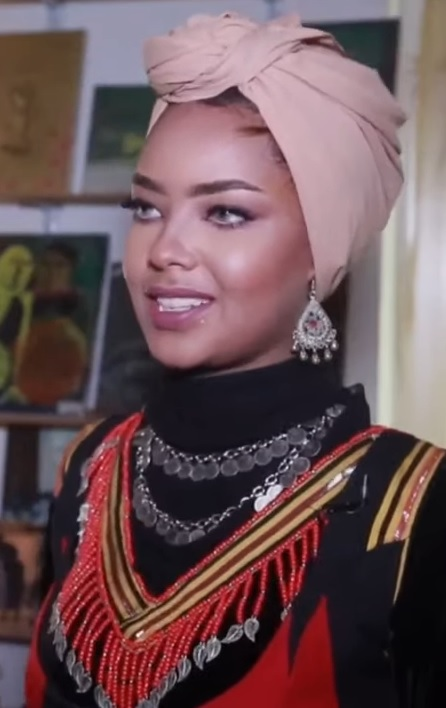
- Born: 25 January 2001 (age 25); Taiz Governorate

Entisar al-Hammadi (Arabic: إنتصار الحمادي) (born 25 January 2001) is a Yemeni actress and model.

== Personal life ==
Entisar was born on 25 January 2001, Taiz Governorate, to a Yemeni father and an Ethiopian mother. She moved to Sana'a with her family. Her family operates a small shop, where they sell Lahoh made by her mother. Al-Hammadi worked in the family shop, assisting in selling Lahoh with an ambition to become a model despite growing up in a conservative society regarding women's issues. In 2017 she began her career as a model and appeared in print and online advertisements for cosmetic and haircare local companies. In 2020 she began acting on television and appeared for the first time in two local TV drama series "Sad al-Gharib" and Ghurbat al-Bun".

== Detention ==
On 20 February 2021 Entisar was detained by the Houthi in Sanaa and sentenced by a Houthi-run court to five years in prison eight months later. The Houthis accused her of "prostitution and drug abuse." She and her lawyers denied these charges. Human Rights Watch said the Houthis carried out an unfair trial of Entisar and her case marred with irregularities and abuse. In July 2021 she was transferred to the hospital as she attempted suicide inside her jail.

According to Amnesty International, Al-Hammadi was "interrogated while blindfolded, physically and verbally abused, and subjected to racist insults.

Nasr, the 12-year-old brother of Entisar, revealed in an interview with The New Arab that his family was unaware of her abduction. He explained that they only learned about her detention through media reports. Nasr also shared that his mother's health had worsened upon hearing the news, as she already suffers from heart problems.

The Houthis released her from prison on 25 October 2025.
