= 2020 Yemen flood =

Flash flood in August 2020

2020 Yemen Flood
- Date: April - August 2020
- Location: Yemen

The 2020 Yemen flood was a flash flood that killed at least 172 people in Yemen and damaged homes and UNESCO-listed world heritage sites across the country, officials said.

== Overview ==
In 2020, Yemen was hit by disastrous flash floods and torrential rains from April to August. In April 2020, an estimated 21,240 families (148,680 people) in 13 governorates were affected by rainstorms and flooding. By August 2020, an estimated 300,000 people lost their homes, crops, livestock, and belongings, with many of the newly displaced already had to flee due to the Yemeni Civil War As of September 2020, nearly 96,000 families were affected in 189 districts in 19 governorates. The most affected areas includes Marib, Amran, Hajjah, Al Hudaydah, Taizz, Lahj, Aden and Abyan governorate where at least 148 people were killed. Flooding is a recurrent problem, showing the growing threat of natural disasters in an already vulnerable country context.

=== Timeline ===
==== April 2020 ====
Yemen was first hit by devastating rains and flooding in April. More than 100,000 people were affected by heavy rain and floods in April. Aden, Abyan, Lahj, Marib and Sana'a governorates and Sana'a City were some of the most affected areas. The floods damaged roads, bridges, the electricity grid, and contaminated water supplies, which prevented thousands of people from being able to access basic services.

==== June 2020 ====
In June, rains followed again and were concentrated in southern and eastern governorates.

==== July-August 2020 ====
For the third time in 2020, torrential rains and flooding hit the country in July and August, causing more damage to infrastructure, destroying homes and shelters and causing deaths and injuries. Houses and historic buildings in the Old City of Sanaa, a UNESCO World Heritage Site, collapsed due to heavy rains.

==== Periodic flooding ====
Yemen has two rainy seasons: the first rains from March to May and the second from July to August. Because this kind of flood occurs with the arrival of the season every year, it has periodicity.

== Causes and impacts ==
=== Direct causes ===
In 2020, heavy rains first hit the country in March and more rainfall followed in June – mainly in southern and eastern governorates and continued in July intensifying at the end of the month and into August.

=== Indirect causes ===
==== Climate risks ====
Yemen fails to meet the growing demand of the population due to the arid climate, minimal seasonal rainfall and evapotranspiration. The climate-induced scarcity of water has led to the over-exploitation of groundwater to alter the terrain, while the expansion of agricultural projects has led to a significant reduction in trees and shrubs, which has also deprived Yemen of a natural barrier against flooding. Experts predict that flooding will become more frequent in the future. More floods have affected Yemen in 2022.

==== Socio-Economic Situation ====
Overall, the lack of broader attention from Yemen itself and the international community and adverse humanitarian, institutional, social, and economic conditions make floods a great challenge to address. Constant flooding makes the environment more vulnerable and puts a lot of pressure on the infrastructure, making it less resilient in the event of a flood. Moreover, the volatile political situation and lack of governance capacity have left policymakers with little time to address issues such as infrastructure.

==== Social and economic impact ====
Yemen's social and economic conditions have been severely impacted by torrential rains and the ensuing flooding, which have resulted in injuries and fatalities, extensive property damage, destroyed homes and shelters, destroyed already precarious infrastructure, accelerated the spread of diseases, destroyed agricultural yields, and killed livestock. Broken facilities (bridges, roads, etc.) and blocked access disrupted humanitarian activities.

==== Environment impact ====
Flood waters carry refinery waste and by-products (salts, chemicals) into the ground, contaminating already scarce groundwater resources, destroying farmland and vegetation, and in turn weakening the natural resistance to flooding.

== Disaster response ==
=== Local and national response ===
Even though floods are a recurring challenge for Yemen, there is limited information about the country's environmental policymaking and disaster management. The impact of the ongoing Yemeni Civil War has limited the country's ability to implement effective disaster management.

With the exception of the governorate of Marib, which was able to mobilize local authorities and create a special taskforce, most of the local authorities in other governorates were not able to take immediate action.

Given that local councils have limited ability to provide short-term services on the ground and carry out long-term strategies, local and international NGOs may "bypass the local councils as an implementation mechanism."

=== International response ===
Since most of the governorates requested external emergence, international donors, in collaboration with national NGOs, "remained the main or even only source of much needed disaster assistance, by delivering and distributing relief materials."

Some responses from international organizations include:

- From July to mid-August 2020, the International Organization for Migration (IOM) reached more than 34,000 people with shelter materials and emergency relief items, flood prevention measures, access to clean water, health services and protection support.
- The World Health Organization (WHO) supported trauma teams and ambulances, set up epidemiological early warning detection points, supplied fuel to hospitals, worked with health authorities to prepare rainfall and floods preparedness and response plan, provided the Central Public Health Laboratory with equipment, trained laboratory technicians on the microscopic diagnosis of malaria.
- The Yemen Red Crescent Society (YRCS) activated its emergency protocol for coordination, mobilizing over 20 staff and 80 volunteers in activities including rapid assessment, first aid, evacuation, ambulance services, and psychosocial support in the most affected areas. With the Disaster Response Emergency Fund (DREF), YRCS mobilized distributed NFI kits that included blankets, hygiene kits and jerry cans.
- UNHCR and partners distributed thousands of NFI kits and Emergency Shelter Kits (ESK).

== Illness, morbidity and mortality ==
The floods caused damage to infrastructure and increased the spread of diseases including cholera, dengue, malaria and diphtheria.

=== Cholera ===
Between 1 January and 30 October 2020, there were 205,662 cases of suspected cholera outbreaks in Yemen.

=== COVID-19 ===
As of 31 August 2020, according to UNICEF reports, Yemen has officially confirmed 1983 cases of COVID-19, of which 572 have died and 1197 have recovered.

=== Food security ===
The floods caused damage to public property and food stocks, and coupled with the country's political instability, currency devaluation, COVID-19 and reduced humanitarian aid, food insecurity has increased dramatically. Widespread food insecurity has led to large numbers of Yemenis becoming malnourished and more susceptible to disease.

=== Mortality ===
An estimated 300,000 were directly affected byheavy rainfall and flooding in 2020. The following are the regions that were severely affected.

==== Sana'a City and Governorate ====
- April 2020: About 650 families affected and about 3,900 people evacuated
- August 2020: By the end of August, 17 people died and 4 were injured across the governorate.

==== Aden and Lahij Governorates ====
- April 2020: About 20 people died and 27 were injured in the storm. As of April 30, 2020, 1,812 families were affected in the IDP camps in Aden and 770 families in Lahij.
- August 2020: At Lahij Governorates, 7 people drowned when a vehicle was swept downstream.

==== AI-Hudayada and Hajja Governorates（Hardest hit provinces） ====
- April 2020: Around 5,130 households were affected.
- July 2020: Over 16 deaths in one month.

==== Marib Governorate） ====
- April 2020: At least 7 dead, 250 injured.
- August 2020: A government official declared the death toll at 30 (including 19 children under the age of 13).

==== Hadhramawt Governorate ====
- July 2020: Over nine people died (including children) and dozens were injured.
