= Abd Rabbo Hussein =

Yemeni general

- Abd Rabbo Hussein
- Died: 22 February 2016; Aden, Yemen
- Military career
- Allegiance: Yemen
- Branch: Yemeni Army
- Rank: General
- Commands: 15th Infantry Brigade
- Conflicts: Yemeni Civil War

Abd Rabbo Hussein (Arabic: عبد ربه حسين, romanized: ʻAbd Rabbih Ḥusayn; d. 22 February 2016, Aden, Yemen) was a Yemeni Army general who commanded the 15th Infantry Brigade of the Hadi government loyalists during the Yemeni Civil War. He was assassinated in February 2016, becoming the highest-ranking commander of the pro-Hadi army to be killed during the conflict. Masked gunmen shot him outside of his residence in Aden, the provisional capital of Yemen.
