= Abdul Wahab Al-Dailami =

Yemeni politician (1938–2021)

Abdul Wahab Al-Dailami (Arabic: عبد الوهاب الديلمي; 1938 – 26 May 2021) was a Yemeni politician.

== Biography ==
Al-Dailami was born in Dhamar, his mother died when he was two years old. He studied in a Kuttab, then he moved to Sanaa, before he went to study at Al-Azhar University with the emergence of the North Yemen Civil War in 1962. Later on, he worked at the Imam Mohammad Ibn Saud Islamic University, and had a master's degree from Umm al-Qura University in 1978, and a PhD from the Imam Mohammad Ibn Saud Islamic University in 1984.

Al-Dailami served as Minister of Justice from 1994 until 1997, and as a member in the House of Representatives from 1986 to 1993.

He was known for his fatwa which encouraged hostilities against people from the Democratic Republic of Yemen during the Yemeni Civil War in 1994, although he denied his involvement in the related voice recording which was published by the 26th September newspaper.

== Personal life ==
Al-Dailami fathered 12 sons and daughters. On 26 May 2021, he died of complications related to COVID-19 in Istanbul during the COVID-19 pandemic in Turkey.
