= 2024 Yemen migrant boat disaster =

Sinking in the Gulf of Aden

- Date: 10 June 2024
- Time: 3:30 a.m.
- Location: Gulf of Aden
- Deaths: 56 deaths
- Missing: Up to 140 migrants were reported missing

On June 10, 2024, 49 migrants drowned when their boat sunk into the Gulf of Aden. The boat was carrying around 260 Somalis and Ethiopians, of which 90 were women. It capsized around 3.30am with 49 deaths immediately confirmed and many more missing.

Local fishermen were the first to rush to help, followed by local non-governmental organisations (NGOs) and the IOM. It had numerous health consequences for the victims and impacted local health services.

== Background ==
Despite Yemen's instability and ongoing civil war, Yemen remains a valuable transit route for many people migrating illegally to the Arab states of the Persian Gulf. These people, mostly men, but also women, and children, generally come from countries in the Horn of Africa, such as Somalia and Ethiopia. They are assisted by smugglers who take them across the Gulf of Aden with life-threatening transfers. Another route links Djibouti and Yemen.

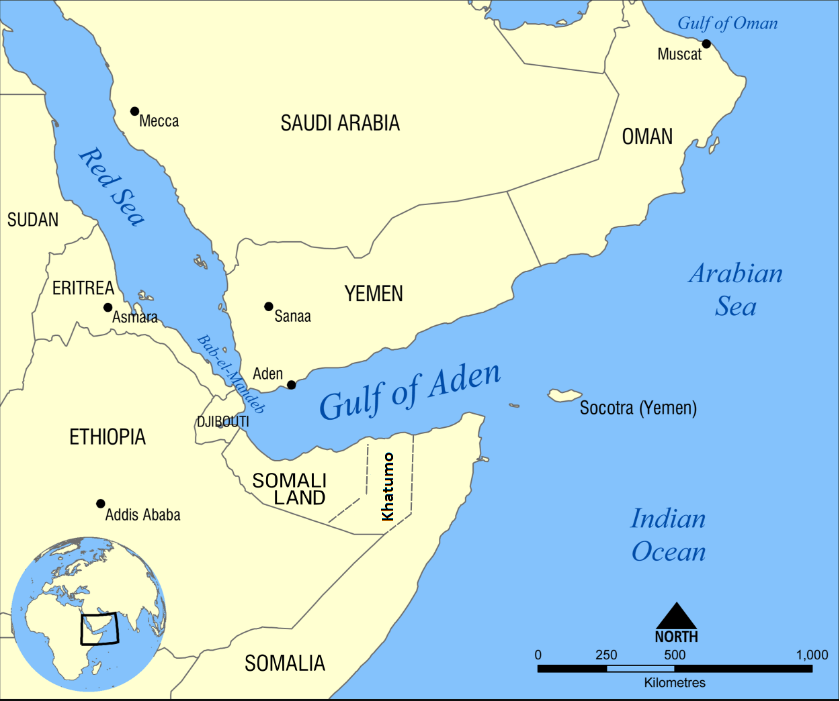
The Gulf of Aden, where the sinking occurred

Strong currents and seasonal rough seas make the route from Somalia or Djibouti to Yemen hazardous. The challenging terrain and infrastructure gaps amplified this disaster's impact. Years of conflict had left Yemen with extremely limited capacity for maritime domain awareness and rescue. The IOM directly cited lack of operational patrol boats and other incident response resources as constraints to post-incident search and rescue efforts.

=== Sinking ===
The boat departed from Bossaso in Somalia on Sunday, June 9, 2024. It occurred at 3.30 a.m. The statistics of the IOM state that there were a total of 260 migrants aboard the ship, including 145 people of Ethiopian nationality and 115 of Somali nationality. They were 90 women on board. After the ship sunk near the Yemeni coast, at least 49 migrant deaths were counted, including 31 women and 6 children. 140 were reported missing.

When the boat reached the coast of Shabwah (approx. 3.7 km or 2.3 miles), strong winds caused the boat to take on water and slant to one side. After traveling for approximately 24 hours, the smugglers forced the migrants to jump off the boat and into the water. A fisherman who witnessed this contacted the IOM who responded immediately, accompanied by the local coast guard and local fisherman.

== Rescue ==
Local fishermen were the first to raise the alarm after spotting bodies floating in the sea and bringing them ashore. Working with residents from nearby coastal communities, they provided immediate humanitarian support to the 78 migrants they helped rescue from the water, demonstrating solidarity and community resilience despite the severe hardships faced by Yemenis themselves as a result of more than a decade of civil-war. Local NGOs and volunteer groups then joined the fishermen in the search for the missing migrants. These community-led efforts involved informal search and rescue operations, transporting survivors to where they could be helped and recovering the bodies of those who had drowned, bringing them to the local cemeteries to be buried.

=== Casualties ===
Directly after the boat capsized the IOM assisted the 71-78 survivors (reports on the number of survivors differ), including the 6 children. Two mobile clinics with medical teams provided first aid and minor physical trauma treatment to 63 of them, while 8 individuals were referred for treatment to a Shabwah hospital and discharged from hospital a couple of days later. As many of the survivors were in shock a psychologist working with the IOM medical mobile team provided further immediate mental health counselling and support to 38 of the survivors.

The local community and fisherman played a significant part not only in the search and rescue but with the burial of between 49 deceased individuals (12 men, 31 women, 6 children). Later accounts confirmed 56 deceased.
