= Muhammad Miftah =

Yemeni Islamic scholar and politician (born 1967)

- محمد مفتاح
- Miftah in 2025

Acting Prime Minister of Yemen (Supreme Political Council)
- Disputed (Note: Tenure as Prime Minister of Yemen disputed by Salem Saleh bin Braik (May 2025-January 2026) and Shaea al-Zindani (January 2026 onwards))
- Assumed office 30 August 2025
- President: Mahdi al-Mashat
- Preceded by: Ahmed al-Rahawi

Deputy Prime Minister of Yemen (Supreme Political Council)
- Incumbent
- Assumed office 10 August 2024
- President: Mahdi al-Mashat
- Prime Minister: Ahmed al-Rahawi

Personal details
- Born: Muhammad Ahmad Ahmad Miftah; 1967 (age 58–59) Al Haymah Al Kharijiyah district, Sanaa Governorate, Yemen Arab Republic
- Party: Al-Haqq

Muhammad Ahmad Ahmad Miftah (Note: Arabic: محمد أحمد أحمد مفتاح, romanized: Muḥammad ʾAḥmad ʾAḥmad Miftāḥ) (born 1967) is a Yemeni Shia Islamic scholar and politician who is serving as the acting prime minister of Yemen in the Ansar Allah (informally known as 'Houthi') led government since 2025. He is also serving as the deputy prime minister of Yemen under the Ansar Allah lead government since 2024.

Born in the al-Haymah district of Sanaa Governorate, he is a prominent scholar and jurist in the Zaydi branch of Shia Islam, which is subscribed to by the Houthis.

== Early life ==
Muhammad Ahmad Ahmad Miftah was born in 1967 in the al-Hayma district of Sanaa Governorate, Yemen. He received his basic education at the martyr Al-Sabri School in Al-Hayma, and began from a young age to give sermons in the mosque of his village and some mosques in the district. He moved to Sanaa to continue his formal education at the Kuwait High School, then the Sanaa Scientific Institute and the Faculty of Education at Sanaa University, where he graduated in 1993.

Miftah later joined the teaching staff at the Ministry of Education with the organization of seminars to teach Shariah sciences in several mosques. He was finally put in charge of giving sermons and giving lectures at the Al-Rawdah mosque in Sanaa. He taught and gave lectures in various Yemeni governorates.

== Early political activities ==
During the Houthi insurgency in Saada Governorate, he publicly voiced condemnation of the government's actions in the conflict. In September 2004, he was arrested as he was leading prayers in the al-Rawdah Grand Mosque in Sanaa. He was charged alongside another Zaydi cleric on accusations of supporting the Houthis and plotting to overthrow the local government, and were using a front group called the Sanaa Youth Organization to achieve this. Both of them contested the claims and maintained that they had only advocated for peaceful dissent. Miftah was sentenced to eight years of imprisonment in May 2005 for "having contacts with the state of Iran with the aim of harming the diplomatic and political position of Yemen", but was pardoned by President Ali Abdullah Saleh in May 2006. As member of Al-Haqq, he was again arrested in 2008.

== Acting Prime Minister and Deputy Prime Minister of Yemen ==
As part of a government reshuffle, on 10 August 2024 he was named First Deputy Prime Minister of the Houthi-affiliated Government of Change and Construction, where he was considered more powerful than al-Rahawi. On 30 August 2025, he was sworn in as Prime Minister, after his predecessor, Ahmed al-Rahawi, was killed in an Israeli strike.
