= Ahmed al-Rahawi =

Yemeni politician (1950–2025)

- أحمد الرهوي
- al-Rahawi in 2025

Prime Minister of Yemen (Supreme Political Council)
- Disputed (Note: Tenure as Prime Minister of Yemen disputed by Ahmad Awad bin Mubarak (2024–2025) and Salem Saleh bin Braik (May–Aug 2025))
- In office 10 August 2024 – 28 August 2025
- President: Mahdi al-Mashat
- Deputy: Muhammad Ahmed Miftah
- Preceded by: Abdel-Aziz bin Habtour
- Succeeded by: Muhammad Ahmed Miftah

Personal details
- Born: 1950 Khanfir, Fadhli Sultanate
- Died: 28 August 2025 (aged 74–75) Sanaa, Yemen
- Cause of death: Assassination by airstrike
- Party: General People's Congress (Pro-Houthi faction)
- Parent: Ghaleb Nasser al-Rahawi (father)

Ahmed Ghaleb Nasser al-Rahawi al-Yafei (Arabic: أحمد غالب ناصر الرَهَوِي اليافِعي, romanized: ʾAḥmad Ghālib Nāṣir ar-Rahawī al-Yāfiʿīyy; 1950 – 28 August 2025) was a Yemeni politician who served as the prime minister of the Houthi-led government from 10 August 2024 until his death in an Israeli airstrike on 28 August 2025. He was a member of the General People's Congress party and previously served on the Supreme Political Council.

== Life ==
Al-Rahawi was born in 1950 in Khanfar, Abyan Governorate, Yemen, and was a member of the Al-Rahawi tribe. His father, Ghaleb Nasser al-Rahawi, was a political figure who was assassinated in the 1970s.

Uncharacteristic for Houthi officials, Al-Rahawi was a Shafi'i Sunni Muslim.

== Career ==
Al-Rahawi served in several high-level local positions from 2000 to 2015 including director general and chairman of the Local Council of Khanfar District, deputy governor of Al Mahwit Governorate and Deputy Governor of Abyan Governorate.

Al-Rahawi was the subject of several assassination attempts, with several family members being injured, and in 2015, Al-Qaeda blew up his only house, in Ba Tays. Afterwards, he moved to the capital of Yemen, Sanaa. He later became the governor of Abyan Governorate and in 2019, he was appointed to the Houthi-led Supreme Political Council, which is the executive body for the Houthi-controlled territory in Yemen.

Al-Rahawi was a member of the General People's Congress party and was a member of the party's Central Committee. On 10 August 2024, al-Rahawi was named the prime minister of Yemen by the Supreme Political Council, succeeding Abdel-Aziz bin Habtour. He became the prime minister as the government was reorganized into what was called the "Government of Change and Construction," announced shortly after his appointment.

== Assassination ==
On 28 August 2025, Al-Rahawi and several companions were killed in an Israeli airstrike on an apartment building in Sanaa, Yemen. His death was confirmed on 30 August by the Houthis. He and other victims of the strike were given a funeral at the Al-Shaab Mosque in Sanaa on 1 September.

The New York Times reported that his death would not have a major impact on the Houthis, as his role was "largely symbolic". Al-Rahawi was not seen as a part of the group's inner leadership circle. His position was transferred to his deputy, Muhammad Ahmed Miftah, on 30 August.
