= Ahmad Awad bin Mubarak =

Yemeni politician (born 1968)

- أحمد عوض بن مبارك
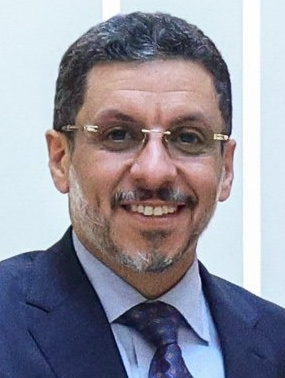
- Mubarak in 2024

11th Prime Minister of Yemen
- Disputed (Note: Tenure as Prime Minister of Yemen disputed by Abdel-Aziz bin Habtour (Feb–Aug 2024) and Ahmad al-Rahawi (2024–2025))
- In office 5 February 2024 – 3 May 2025
- President: Rashad al-Alimi
- Preceded by: Maeen Abdulmalik Saeed
- Succeeded by: Salem Saleh bin Braik

Minister of Foreign Affairs of Yemen
- In office 18 December 2020 – 27 March 2024
- President: Abd Rabbuh Mansur Hadi; Rashad al-Alimi
- Preceded by: Mohammed Al-Hadhrami
- Succeeded by: Shaya Mohsin al-Zindani

General Secretary of the National Dialogue Conference
- In office June 2013 – 2014 (as General Secretary of the Preparatory Committee of the NDC)

Personal details
- Born: 1968 (age 57–58) Aden, South Yemen
- Education: University of Baghdad

Ahmad Awad bin Mubarak (Arabic: أحمد عوض بن مبارك, romanized: Aḥmad ʿAwaḍ b. Mubārak; born 1968) is a Yemeni politician who served as the prime minister of Yemen from 2024 to 2025. Before his appointment as Prime Minister, he was the former Foreign Minister of Yemen, and before that he served as Ambassador of Yemen to the United States.

== Early and personal life ==
Mubarak was born in 1968 in Aden. He has three children. His father was a businessman.

He received a PhD in business administration from Baghdad University and is a professor at Sana'a University, where he heads the business administration center, which is cooperatively administrated by Sanaa University and Maastricht School of Management (MSM). Dr. Mubarak is attached as professor to the joint MBA program conducted by MSM and Sanaa University.

Previously, he served as consultant for numerous international projects in Yemen in education, employment and international development. He is also a member of the administrative board for the Youth Leaders Development Fund and had headed many administrative consultancies, training sessions and workshops for a number of public and private associations in Yemen, Bahrain, Burundi, Ethiopia, Romania, Netherlands, France and Germany.

At Science and Technology University in Sanaa, he had served as head of the administrative information technology and marketing and production administration departments, as well as being the manager of quality and development assurance from 2007 to 2009.

== Politics ==
In March 2013, Bin Mubarak was elected as the secretary general of the national reconciliation dialogue conference, composed of representatives of all political parties and civic groups, tasked with carrying out reforms. It was disbanded in January 2014 after endorsing a federal political system for the country. He was then director of the president's office.

After the Saudi-backed Yemeni government bombed the north of the country, the Houthis, whose traditional homeland is in the north, near the Saudi border, protested in the capital Sana'a. Armed protesters took over government areas. This uprising led to Prime Minister Mohammed Basindwa's resignation. Bin Mubarak was promoted from Chief of Staff and appointed Prime Minister by President Abd Rabbuh Mansur Hadi despite Houthi opposition, citing a lack of an official agreement resolving the conflict. However, Ahmad withdrew from the post on 9 October 2014.

Bin Mubarak was abducted by gunmen believed to be loyal to former president Ali Abdullah Saleh in Sana'a on 17 January 2015. Houthi and government officials reached a deal on 21 January to end a months-long military and political standoff in the capital that was reportedly to include bin Mubarak's release, but the agreement quickly collapsed as Hadi and his ministers quit under rebel pressure. He was reportedly released in Shabwa Governorate on 27 January, ten days after his kidnapping.

On 3 August 2015, he was appointed Yemeni Ambassador to the United States and was also appointed ambassador to the United Nations in 2018.

== Prime Minister of Yemen ==
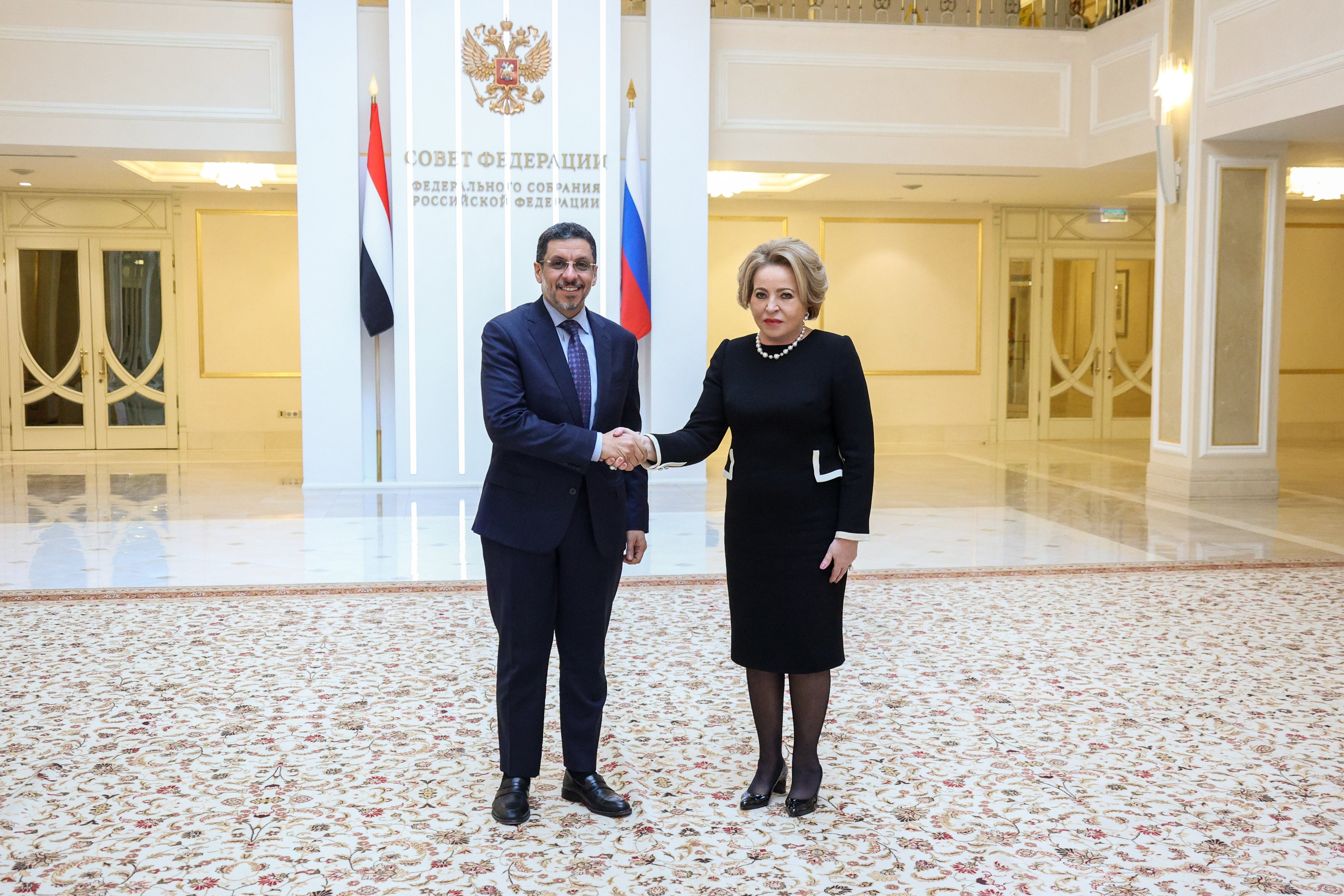
Bin Mubarak with Russia's Federation Council Speaker Valentina Matviyenko in Moscow, 28 February 2024

On 5 February 2024, the internationally recognized Yemeni Presidential Leadership Council appointed Bin Mubarak as Prime Minister, replacing Maeen Abdulmalik Saeed. He resigned on 3 May 2025, citing his inability to undertake "necessary decisions to reform the state institution, and execute the necessary Cabinet reshuffle".
