= Mahdi al-Mashat =

Current de facto President of Yemen

- مهدي المشاط
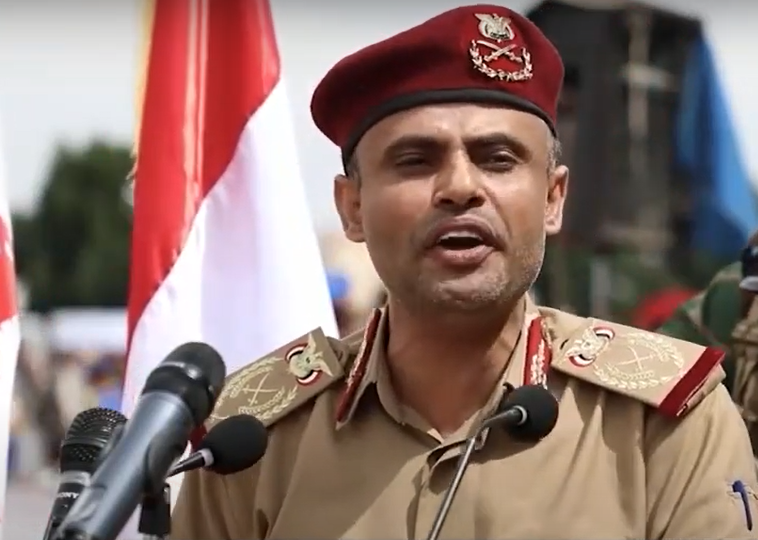
- al-Mashat in 2022

Chairman of the Supreme Political Council
- Disputed (Note: Tenure as Chairman of the Supreme Political Council disputed by Abdrabbuh Mansur Hadi (2018–2022) and Rashad al-Alimi (2022 onwards))
- Assumed office 25 April 2018
- Prime Minister: Abdel-Aziz bin Habtour; Ahmed al-Rahawi; Muhammad Ahmed Miftah (acting)
- Deputy: Qassem Labozah; Sadeq Amin Abu Rass
- Preceded by: Saleh Ali al-Sammad

Personal details
- Born: 1986 (age 39–40) Ould Nouar, Saada Governorate, North Yemen

Military service
- Allegiance: Yemen (de facto under Supreme Political Council)
- Years of service: 2019–present
- Rank: Field marshal
- Commands: Yemeni Armed Forces (SPC); Houthi movement
- Battles/wars: Houthi insurgency in Yemen: Yemeni Civil War (2014–present); Saudi Arabian-led intervention in Yemen; Gaza war; Red Sea crisis; 2024 missile strikes in Yemen; April 2024 Iranian strikes on Israel

Mahdi al-Mashat (Arabic: مهدي المشاط, romanized: Mahdī al-Mashāṭ; born 1986) is a Yemeni politician and military officer who serves as the chairman of the Supreme Political Council, the executive body of the Houthis.

== Biography ==
He hails from the remote hamlet Ould Nouar in the Ḥaydan district, Saada Governorate, an area where many northern Yemeni separatists come from. Since youth, he has been acquainted with one of the leaders of the Houthi rebellion, Abdul-Malik al-Houthi, also a key figure in the Zaidi movement since 2004. They are allegedly related by marriage. From 2014 on, al-Mashat was the director of al-Houthis office, his spokesman and representative in peace talks with the United Nations, among other posts.

In November 2013, he participated in an attack on the town of Dammaj in Saada. From May 2016, he was a member of the Supreme Political Council and was considered a representative of the hawkish faction. He participated in talks with the Chinese authorities in September 2016.

On 19 April 2018, he became Chairman of the Supreme Political Council, after the assassination of Saleh Ali al-Sammad. He is considered chief of the separatist political authorities of northern Yemen, while al-Houthi is head of the movement.

In July 2021, the Supreme Political Council prolonged his tenure for three more terms. Concerning an UN brokered nationwide two-month truce of mid-2022, the first since 2016, he declared not to object an extension, while criticizing its terms for "not being encouraging enough".

In April 2023, he promised to form a committee to investigate the Sanaa stampede. Also in April, he met with a Saudi Arabian delegation. These Omani mediated talks failed in July. After 10 war years, al-Mashat came up with an outline for peace talks in September 2024. According to the Chinese news agency Xinhua, he demanded financial, military as well as logistical concessions, among them points that had been crucial in earlier talks.

== Notes and references ==
Notes

Political offices
Preceded by Saleh Ali al-Sammad	— DISPUTED — Chairman of the Supreme Political Council of Yemen; 2018–present Disputed by Abdrabbuh Mansur Hadi and Rashad al-Alimi (Presidential Leadership Council); Reason for dispute: Yemeni Civil War (2014–present)	Incumbent
