= Maeen Abdulmalik Saeed =

Yemeni Politician and Former Prime Minister

- مَعِيِن عبد الملك سَعِيِد الصَّبْرِي
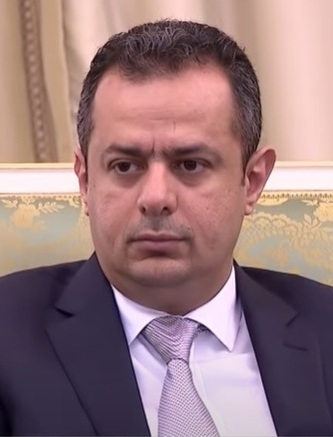
- Saeed in 2019

10th Prime Minister of Yemen
- Disputed
- In office 18 October 2018 – 5 February 2024
- President: Abdrabbuh Mansur Hadi; Rashad al-Alimi
- Preceded by: Ahmed Obeid bin Daghr
- Succeeded by: Ahmad Awad bin Mubarak

Personal details
- Born: 1976 (age 49–50) Taiz, Yemen Arab Republic

Maeen Abdulmalik Saeed (Arabic: مَعِيِن عبد الملك سَعِيِد الصَّبْرِي, romanized: Maʿīn ʿAbd al-Malik Saʿīd; born 1976) is a Yemeni politician who served as the prime minister of Yemen from 2018 to 2024. He previously served as the minister of public works in Prime Minister Ahmed Obeid bin Daghr's cabinet.

== Education ==
Saeed holds a Master’s and Doctorate degree in architecture and design theories from the Faculty of Engineering at Cairo University.

== Career ==
Saeed worked as an architect and a technocratic figure, who worked in an advisory group in Cairo in the field of planning and construction. He also worked as an assistant professor in the Engineering Faculty at Thamar University. Saeed participated with the governmental delegation in consultation rounds with Houthi militias in the first Geneva conference and in the Swiss city of Biel and in Kuwait.

== Prime Minister of Yemen (2018-2024) ==
On 18 October 2018, Yemen's President Abdrabbuh Mansur Hadi sacked Ahmed Obeid bin Daghr, blaming him for the economic crisis rocking Yemen. Saeed was appointed in his place, making him the youngest prime minister in Yemen's history.

On 7 April 2022, President Hadi handed power to a Presidential Leadership Council (PLC) chaired by Rashad al-Alimi.

On 5 February 2024, Saeed was removed as prime minister by the PLC and was named as a presidential advisor. He was replaced in his position by Ahmad Awad bin Mubarak.

== 2020 airport attack ==
On 30 December 2020, a plane carrying Saeed and other members of the newly-formed Yemeni government landed at the Aden International Airport from Saudi Arabia. During the plane's landing, bombs exploded at the airport and gunmen then opened fire. At least 25 people were killed and more than 110 others were wounded. Saeed was taken to safety.

Political offices
Preceded by Ahmed Obeid bin Daghr	Prime Minister of Yemen; 2018–2024	Succeeded by Ahmad Awad bin Mubarak
