= Prime Minister of Yemen =

Head of government

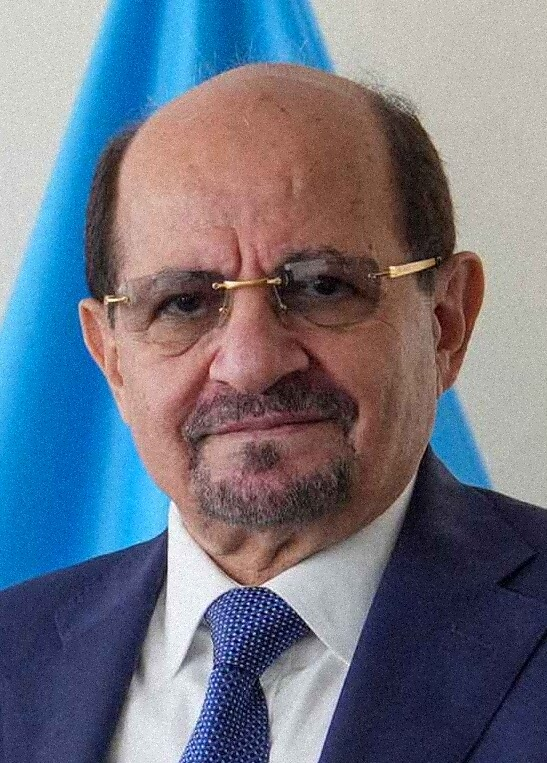
- Incumbent; Shaya al-Zindani since 6 February 2026 Claimed by Muhammad Ahmed Miftah (acting) (Supreme Political Council (Houthis)) since 30 August 2025
- Style: His Excellency
- Appointer: Presidential Leadership Council
- Inaugural holder: Haidar Abu Bakr al-Attas
- Formation: May 22, 1990
- Salary: 180,000 YER (2011)
- Website: pmo-ye.net (PLC)

The prime minister of the Republic of Yemen is the head of government of Yemen. Under the Constitution of Yemen, the prime minister is appointed by the president, and must, like his cabinet, enjoy confidence from the House of Representatives. The prime minister selects the cabinet in coordination with the president.

== History ==
Yemen's Presidential Leadership Council issued a decision on 5 February 2024 appointing its foreign minister Ahmed Awad bin Mubarak as the country's new prime minister. Bin Mubarak resigned from his post on 3 May 2025 and announced it on a social media post, saying that he wasn't able to take "necessary decisions to reform the state institution, and execute the necessary Cabinet reshuffle."

== List of prime ministers ==
Status

Denotes Acting Prime Minister

Portrait	Prime Minister (Birth–Death)	Term of office			Political party	President(s) (Term)
Portrait	Prime Minister (Birth–Death)	Took office	Left office	Time in office	Political party	President(s) (Term)
	Haidar Abu Bakr al-Attas (born 1939)	22 May 1990	9 May 1994 (deposed)	3 years, 352 days	Yemeni Socialist Party	Ali Abdullah Saleh (1990–2012)
	Muhammad Said al-Attar (1927–2005)	9 May 1994	6 October 1994	150 days	Independent	Ali Abdullah Saleh (1990–2012)
	Abdul Aziz Abdul Ghani (1939–2011)	6 October 1994	14 May 1997	2 years, 220 days	General People's Congress	Ali Abdullah Saleh (1990–2012)
	Faraj Said Bin Ghanem (1937–2007)	14 May 1997	29 April 1998	350 days	Independent	Ali Abdullah Saleh (1990–2012)
	Abdul-Karim Al-Iryani (1934–2015)	29 April 1998	31 March 2001	2 years, 336 days	General People's Congress	Ali Abdullah Saleh (1990–2012)
	Abdul Qadir Bajamal (1946–2020)	31 March 2001	7 April 2007	6 years, 7 days	General People's Congress	Ali Abdullah Saleh (1990–2012)
	Ali Muhammad Mujawar (born 1953)	7 April 2007	10 December 2011 (resigned)	4 years, 247 days	General People's Congress	Ali Abdullah Saleh (1990–2012)
	Mohammed Basindawa (born 1935)	10 December 2011	24 September 2014 (resigned)	2 years, 288 days	Independent	Abdrabbuh Mansour Hadi (2012–2022)
	Abdullah Mohsen al-Akwa (born 1961)	24 September 2014	9 November 2014	46 days	Al-Islah	Abdrabbuh Mansour Hadi (2012–2022)
	Khaled Bahah (born 1965)	9 November 2014	3 April 2016	1 year, 146 days	Independent	Abdrabbuh Mansour Hadi (2012–2022)
	Ahmed Obaid Bin Dagher (born 1952)	4 April 2016	15 October 2018	2 years, 195 days	General People's Congress	Abdrabbuh Mansour Hadi (2012–2022)
	Maeen Abdulmalik Saeed (born 1976)	18 October 2018	5 February 2024	5 years, 110 days	Independent	Abdrabbuh Mansour Hadi (2012–2022)
	Maeen Abdulmalik Saeed (born 1976)	18 October 2018	5 February 2024	5 years, 110 days	Independent	Rashad al-Alimi (since 2022)
	Ahmad Awad bin Mubarak (born 1968)	5 February 2024	3 May 2025	1 year, 87 days	Independent	Rashad al-Alimi (since 2022)
	Salem Saleh bin Braik (born 1965)	3 May 2025	15 January 2026	257 days	Independent	Rashad al-Alimi (since 2022)
	Shaya al-Zindani (born 1954)	15 January 2026	Incumbent	310 days	Independent	Rashad al-Alimi (since 2022)
Houthi-controlled Yemen
Supreme Political Council
	Talal Aklan (born 19??) (Note: Appointed by the Houthis, in rebellion during their takeover and its aftermath.) (in rebellion)	1 March 2016	4 October 2016	217 days	Yemeni Socialist Party	Mohammed al-Houthi (2015–2016)
	Abdel-Aziz bin Habtour (born 1955) (in rebellion)	4 October 2016	10 August 2024	7 years, 311 days	General People's Congress (Pro-Houthi faction)	Saleh Ali al-Sammad (2016–2018)
	Abdel-Aziz bin Habtour (born 1955) (in rebellion)	4 October 2016	10 August 2024	7 years, 311 days	General People's Congress (Pro-Houthi faction)	Mahdi al-Mashat (since 2018)
	Ahmed al-Rahawi (1950–2025) (in rebellion)	10 August 2024	28 August 2025 (killed)	1 year, 18 days	General People's Congress (Pro-Houthi faction)	Mahdi al-Mashat (since 2018)
	Muhammad Ahmed Miftah (born 1967) (in rebellion)	30 August 2025	Incumbent	1 year, 83 days	Party of Truth	Mahdi al-Mashat (since 2018)

== See also ==
- Cabinet of Yemen
- List of heads of government of Yemen
- Politics of Yemen
- Prime Minister of Yemen Arab Republic (North Yemen)
- List of leaders of South Yemen
