= Timeline of Yemeni history =

This is a timeline of Yemeni history, comprising important legal and territorial changes and political events in Yemen and its predecessor states. To understand the context to these events, see History of Yemen. See also the List of rulers of Saba and Himyar, the list of Imams of Yemen and the list of presidents of Yemen.

== 23rd century BC ==
Year	Date	Event
2300 BC		According to some legends, the ethnic Arab inhabitants of South Arabia become unified under the leadership of Qahtan.

== 21st century BC ==
Year	Date	Event
2100 BC		To the East of Qahtan A'ad settles Oman.

== 16th century BC ==
Year	Date	Event
1600 BC		The Qahtanis began to move to the Tihama coasts and the lowlands. A tradeline began to flourish along the red Sea Tihama coasts. During this period the Qahtanis began to settle in small trading colonies in neighboring East Africa.

== 12th century BC ==
Year	Date	Event
1200 BC		The Sabaean Kingdom came into existence.

== 9th century BC ==
Year	Date	Event
900 BC		The Qahtanis began using a variant of the Phoenician script; this will lead to the recording of South Arabian history from this point onwards.

== 8th century BC ==
Year	Date	Event
800 BC		Ma'een kingdom builds its capital in Baraqish.
800 BC		The Sabeans build their capital on the edge of the mountains regions in Sirwah.
800 BC		The Qatabanians rise as Sabean vassals in the region known now (AD 1990) as central and east Yemen.
800 BC		Hadhramawt rise as Sabean vassal kingdom in the region known now (AD 1990) as eastern Yemen.
800 BC		Awsan appears as independent nation in a region that will partly controlled by the Qatabanians.
719 BC		The temple of Marib is finished.
718 BC		War between Ma'een and the Sabeans.
716 BC		After securing their borders with Ma'een the Sabeans moved their capital to the more accessible Marib.
715 BC		The Sabeans control the trade line and started recording diplomatic relationships with Assyria.
715 BC		Sumhu`alay Yanuf and his son Yatha`amar Bayyin complete building the Marib Dam.

== 7th century BC ==
Year	Date	Event
700 BC		The Qatabanians build Timna and rebel against the authority of Saba.
675 BC		Karib'il Watar defeats the rebellion and brings all of South Arabia under the Sabean rule.

== 6th century BC ==
Year	Date	Event
600 BC		Saba reaches its height of power and extends its hegemony across the Red sea establishing the Dm't Kingdom, this will be the nucleus of the Semitic culture of East Africa. Although it is not the first attempt of the Qahtanis to expand their rule to the African coast.

== 5th century BC ==
Year	Date	Event
500 BC		The Dam of Marib breaks, Saba suffers from drought and rebellions.
500 BC		The Ma'een kingdom allied with the Qatabanians and Hadramites rebel against Saba and gain their independence.
500 BC		Ma'een establishes itself as the dominant kingdom in the north of Yemen, extending its authority on the northern Red Sea coasts, and establishes military/trading colonies as far as Sinai.

== 4th century BC ==
Year	Date	Event
370 BC		Qahtani tribes attack the Persians out of Musqat in the Eastern tip of the Arabian peninsula. From that time on Qahtanis replaced the Ancient Arabs 'Ad in Oman.

== 2nd century BC ==
Year	Date	Event
110 BC		Himyar rises against Qataban.

== 1st century BC ==
Year	Date	Event
100 BC		Ma'een declines gradually mainly due to the Roman control of the new sea trade routes.
100 BC		Himyar starts expanding on the expense of the war-torn kingdom of Saba.
100 BC		The remains of the Qhatani Jurhum tribe integrate their lineage under Nizar bin Ma'ad bin Adnan. From this point on they become the Adnanites.
100 BC		Himyar allied itself with most of the Qahatni tribes of the lowlands and central highlands, annexing most of Saba and Southern Qataban, but Hadhramout repels them.
25 BC		The Romans encouraged by the civil war in South Arabia attempt to invade the region, but fail to survive the Arabian desert.
25 BC		Sabean civil war, Himyar closes in on Saba and takes over most of the Sabean central highlands, red sea coasts territory. Saba breaks into two smaller states in the northern highlands and the desert region around the capital Marib.

== 1st century AD ==
Year	Date	Event
100		The Kingdom of Aksum dominates East Africa and takesover the Sabean trading/military colonies.
100		The Kahlan tribes remain as the only tribes still loyal to the Sabean state at Marib, Kahlan tribes cornered in the area between Sana'a and Marib in the north of Yemen.

== 2nd century ==
Year	Date	Event
200		Jews settle Yemen.
200		Himyar captures most of Qataban.
200		Himyar annexes the Sabean state of Marib.
200		After the loss of Marib Saba, Kahlans septs Azd, Hamdan, Lakhm, Tai headed north except for the Hashid and Bakil tribes of Hamdan of Gurat Saba (Arabic: جرت) and Kindah in the Ramlah Desert.

== 3rd century ==
Year	Date	Event
211		Hadhramout allies itself with Qataban and Aksum attacking Himyar from the West and the east.
217		While the Himyarites are fighting the Hadhramout/Qataban alliance in the east, the Aksumites capture the Himyarite capital Zafar.
221		Hadhramout annexes Qataban and reaches its height of power.
222		The Aksumites attempt to capture Hadhramout from the coast.
225		During the reign of Sha`irum Awtar the Himyarites/Sabeans attack the Kingdom of Hadhramout from the East and capture their capital.
227		The Gurat Sabeans and Himyar ally themselves against the Aksumites and retake Zafar. The Aksumites lose all their territories in South Arabia except for Tihama.
229		Himyar recaptures Southern Tihama and controls the Major East African ports across from Muza'a. The Aksumites keep the Northern strip of Tihama.
229		The Kahlani Imran bin Azd branch expel the Persians from Oman.
231		The Kahlani Jifna bin Azd branch settles Syria and Lakhm settles Mesopotamia.
280		Himyar annexes the last Sabean enclave to its Kingdom.
300		Himyar annexes Hadhramout expanding its borders to Dhofar Oman. to the East of their borders the Azd bin Imran (Azd Uman).

== 4th century ==
Year	Date	Event
320		Himyar annexes Socotra.
325		From Al-Ramlah in Yemen, Shiekh of Kindah makes alliances with Adnani tribes of Najd.
390		Abu-Kariba Asad King of Himyar converts to Judaism and spreads the religion in the region.

== 5th century ==
Year	Date	Event
425		Himyar appoints Akil al-Murar ibn Amr as the first Hujr of its Northern Kindite colonies.
480		Amr al-Mansur ibn Hudjr rises his status to the king (vassal to Himyar) and bring the Northern part of the Arabian peninsula under Himyarite control.
500		Christianity spreads in Najran/Tihama strip an area still allied to the Christian Aksum kingdom.
500		Two Jews from Yathrib travel to Himyar in the hope of converting the people of Himyar to Judaism.

== 6th century ==
Year	Date	Event
523		King Dhu Nuwas converts to Judaism, he begins a campaign to convert the Himyarites into Judaism. Himyarites convert in big numbers except in Najran.
525		At this time Himyar included all the Arabian Peninsula (via Kindah) and he was angered by the Najrani chief refusal to leave Christianity. Dhu Nawas took Najran and massacred 20,000 Najrani Christians.
525		The Christian Aksumites defeat Dhu Nawas and annex Himyar, starting a period of persecution against the Yemenite Jews. A third of the population of Yemenite Jews is exiled to Aksum.
570		The Dam of Marib broke for the third and final time, triggering another migration of Yemeni tribes. The Qur'an itself refers to the collapse of the Marib Dam as a punishment on the Sabaeans for their ungratefulness to God.
570		Under Khosrau I, Persian forces expel the Aksumites with the help of Dhu Yazin. Persians later assassinate Dhu Yazin and try to establish their rule over all Yemen, but they fail and a number of autonomous kingdoms are established.

== 7th century ==
Year	Date	Event
628		The final Persian governor of Yemen, Badhan, converted to Islam, thus nominally submitting the entirety of Yemen to the new faith.
632		Al-Aswad al-Ansi proclaims himself prophet and attracts a large following. He captures Sana'a, but is killed by the Persian al-Abna' shortly after.
660		Yemen is captured by the pro-Umayyad forces during the First Fitna.
686		Kharijites under Najda ibn Amir attack Yemen during the Second Fitna.
687		Kharijite attacks continue, and Sana'a is forced to submit to Najda ibn Amir.

== 8th century ==
Year	Date	Event
740		Imam Zayd ibn Ali, founder of Fiver Islam leads revolt in Kufa against Umayyads. The revolt is brutally crushed and Zayd killed. Some followers remained in Medina, when Imam Al-Hadi Yahya would bring Zaidiyyah to Sa'dah in the thirteenth century.

== 9th century ==
Year	Date	Event
893		Imam al-Hadi ila'l-Haqq Yahya arrives in Yemen for the first time.
897		Establishment of the Zaydi imamate under al-Hadi at Saada.

== 12th century ==
Year	Date	Event
1165		Mass conversions from Judaism to Islam.
1173		Saladin annexes both the Hejaz and Yemen to his Ayyubid sultanate.

== 13th century ==
Year	Date	Event
1229		The Rasulid dynasty rules Yemen until 1454.

== 16th century ==
Year	Date	Event
1514		In response to Portuguese occupation of Kamaran island, a fleet from the Mamluk Sultanate attack and occupy the western and southern shores of the Timurid territory in Yemen.
1517		Ottomans capture Egypt and eliminate the Mamluk dynasty, then move on to Yemen, where they occupy Aden. Sana'a and the rest of Yemen remain under the Zaidi dynasty.
1538	August	Admiral Sulayman Pasha captures Aden for Sultan Suleiman the Magnificent in order to provide an Ottoman base for raids against Portuguese possessions on the western coast of the Indian subcontinent.
1540		Residents of Aden rise up against the Ottomans, slaughter the garrison and invite Portuguese protection. The Portuguese stay until driven out by the Ottoman fleet under Admiral Peri Pasha.
1595		Imam Al-Qasim ibn Muhammad begins a rebellion against the Ottomans that would last for 30 years.

== 17th century ==
Year	Date	Event
1618		British establish a "factory" (trading post) at Mocha on the Red Sea coast.
1630		The East India Company begins trade in coffee from Mocha, which held a monopoly on the plant at the time.
1635		The Ottomans are expelled from Yemen.

== 18th century ==
Year	Date	Event
1728		Fadl ibn Ali, chief of the Abdali tribe, declares Lahej an independent sultanate.
1735		Fadl ibn Ali's forces capture Aden and make it part of the Sultanate of Lahej.
1785		Americans begin to compete with British for the coffee trade from Mocha and by 1800 would become the main exporters of Yemen's most important article of foreign trade.

== 19th century ==
Year	Date	Event
1837		Forces of Muhammad Ali, nominally the Egyptian vassal of the Ottoman Empire, occupy Ta'izz. The British warn him against further military movements.
1839		In response to an incident in which Arab traders plundered a British vessel, Captain Haines sailed against Aden and finding resistance bombards then occupies it for the East India Company's Bombay Presidency, requiring the Sultan of Lahej to accept British protection. Aden will serve as a major refueling port when the Suez Canal opens in 1869.
1849		Ottomans establish presence on the Red Sea coast, but the Ottoman force sent to take Sana'a is massacred after accepting invitation to enter the city.
1850s		Beginning of "the time of corruption", which would last until the end of the century. Zaidis lost major ports to other tribes; widespread food shortages; rivalry for the imamate; with Qāsimī rule collapsing, Turkish incursions into the highlands meet with support.
1872		Ottomans occupy the northern Yemen, taking Sana'a and spreading out southward around Taiz. Imam Al-Mutawakkil al-Muhsin withdraws to the north.

== 20th century ==
Year	Date	Event
1904		Yahya Muhammad Hamid ed-Din, a descendant of Imam al-Qasim, becomes Imam and takes regnal name of al-Mutawakkil 'ala Allah ("He who relies on God").
1911	January	At a time when the Ottoman Empire was trying to pacify Albania and was facing hostile moves by Italy against Libya, both Imam Yahya and Muhammad ibn Ali al-Idrisi, Emir of Asir rose up against the Turks, causing the Ottomans to send 30,000 troops from Libya to respond. Forced to fight in the highlands, Yemen became "the graveyard of the Turks."
1911	October	Treaty of Daan: When war with Italy broke out, the Ottomans were forced to accept Zaidi autonomy in the highlands, while remaining in possession of the Red Sea coast. Turkey also provided financial aid to Imam Yahya. The agreement, which conceded most of the demands Imam Yahya had been making since 1908, stopped the almost continuous war between the Turks and Zaidis, even though the Ottoman parliament did not ratify it until 1913.
1914	March	Anglo-Turkish Treaty on boundaries concludes work of Anglo-Turkish Boundary Commission which had begun in 1902. The powers agree on division between their respective realms in Yemen, a division that would more-or-less later serve as the boundary between North and South Yemen.
1918	Early December	Turkish governor of Yemen informs Imam Yahya that "Franks" (the European allies) had overrun Anatolia and that the Ottomans would be forced to withdraw from Yemen. Through a series of alliances, tribal wars and intrigues Yahya would consolidate Zaidi hold over to the south of Sa'da (including Sana'a) and would begin moving north against the Idrisi state of Asir.
1926	September 2	Treaty of friendship between Italy and Imam Yahya. Italy becomes the first power to recognize Yahya as King of Yemen.
1934	February 11	Treaty of Sana'a between Yemen and Great Britain. The parties agree on a modus vivendi without resolving claims of sovereignty on either side.
1934	May 20	Treaty of Taif ends brief border war between Al-Saud and Yemen. Yemen cedes Asir to Saudi Arabia.
1944	June	Having fled the court of the Crown Prince in Ta'izz, Ahmad Muhammad Numan, Muhammad Mahmud al-Zabayri and Zayd al-Mawshki arrive in Aden where later that year they would form the Free Yemeni Party.
1946	March 4	The United States recognizes the Kingdom of Yemen by letter from President Harry S. Truman to Imam Yahya, providing for the appointment of an American Special Diplomatic Mission to the Kingdom.
1948	February 17	Yahya assassinated. He would be succeeded by his son Ahmad who rallied northern tribesmen to defeat nationalist opponents of feudal rule.
1947	December 2-4	Anti-Jewish pogrom in Aden. 82 Jews were killed and 76 were injured by Arabic nationalists.
1955	March 31-April 1	Army officers who objected to Imam Ahmad's conservative rule, especially his harsh and summary punishments, laid siege to the Elurdhi fortress in Taiz while the Imam was inside. The Imam's brothers supported the coup attempt with Emir Abdullah bin Yahyi (purportedly reformist minded) accepting the army's call to replace Ahmad and Emir Abbas telegraphed support from Sana'a. Crown prince al-Badr rallied tribal support and Liberals (local and emigres in Cairo) among others supported him. The siege was raised and Ahmad restored on April 5, and both Abdullah and Abbas were executed.
1956	April 21	Jiddah Pact: Imam Ahmad, Premier Nasser (of Egypt) and King Saud (of Saudi Arabia) sign pace in Jeddah pledging the armies of all three would be placed under a single command to repel invasion. Nasser expressed his goal to "spoil British imperialist plans in the Middle East," but Egypt had no then pending dispute with Britain unlike Yemen (which disputed the border with Aden and the ownership of the Red Sea island of Kamana) and Saudi Arabia (which Britain accused of fomenting anti-British sentiment among tribes on their border).
1958	March 8	As a concession to pro-Nasserite opinion and to avoid Egyptian aid to republican opposition, Yemen enters loose federation with the United Arab Republic to form the United Arab States. The signing ceremony took place in Damascus between Egypt's President Nasser and crown prince Muhammad al-Badr.
1958	April	Aden's colonial governor Sir William Luce warns British government against too hasty a withdrawal from Aden citing the possible hostile threat of Egypt and the Soviet Union aiding Yemen in securing domination over Aden.
1959	February 11	Six West Aden protectorate states (but not the colony of Aden itself) join the Federation of Arab Emirates of the South and the Federation and Britain signed a "Treaty of Friendship and Protection," which detailed plans for British financial and military assistance.
1959	April	Imam Ahmad, gravely ill, departs for Italy for treatment. Muhammad al-Badr left in charge brings in Egyptian development experts and rattles sabers against Britain in Aden.
1959	August 13	Sana'a Radio broadcasts a message from Imam Ahmad that he had returned and had discovered plots. He said that there would be some whose "heads would be cut off" and others' "heads and legs would be cut off." Suspecting that Egypt was supporting republicans within Yemen, Ahmad sent many Egyptian civil, educational and military advisers back to Cairo and stopped the work of others.
1962	September 18	Imam Ahmad dies. Crown prince al-Badr succeeds him, unopposed.
1962	September 26	A federation of South Arabia formed, uniting Aden and the federated hinterlands under British auspices.
1962	September 26	During the night, the building in which Imam al-Badr worked was surrounded and shelled by tanks. Egypt-backed Junior army officers seize power and proclaim the Yemen Arab Republic, sparking an eight-year civil war between royalists supported by Saudi Arabia and republicans backed by Egypt. The British government, though divided, decides to support the royalists.
1962	November	Egypt announces the formation of the National Liberation Army to free southern Yemen from British rule.
1963	October 14	Two nationalist groups, the Front for the Liberation of Occupied South Yemen and the National Liberation Front begin an armed revolt (Aden Emergency) against British control in South Yemen. Fighting began in Radfan, but the British quickly subdued it.
1965	June	Britain invokes emergency powers to deal with increasing unrest in Aden.
1966	February	Britain announces (in a reversal) that Aden was not vital to its commercial security and would be abandoned (naval base and all) by 1968.
1967	November 30	South Yemen granted independence by Great Britain and begins a socialist experiment.
1986	January 13	Gangland-style assassination attempt by the guard of South Yemen President Ali Nasser Mohammed al-Hassani on his rivals in the 15-member Politboro, killing Vice President Ali Antar and sparking gun fight among Politboro members. Twelve days of street fighting in Aden followed until the hard-line Marxists gained control and President Hassani was driven into exile.
1989	February 16	Heads of states of Egypt, Iraq, Jordan and Yemen announce form Baghdad the formation of the Arab Cooperation Council.
1990	May 22	Yemeni unification.
1990	August 6	Yemen abstains from UN Security Council resolutions authorizing military action against Iraq (as a result of its invasion of Kuwait). As a result, 800,000 Yemeni workers are expelled from Saudi Arabia and Kuwait.
1994	May 5	Southern Yemen attempts to secede, sparking a civil war, which is brought to an end in July when northern forces capture Aden.
1999	September 23	Ali Abdullah Saleh receives 99.3% of the vote in the first presidential election by universal suffrage.

== 21st century ==
Year	Date	Event
2000	October 12	While refueling at a water-borne platform off the port of Aden, the USS Cole, a guided-missile destroyer, was attacked by terrorist affiliated with Al-Qaeda who detonated C-4 plastic explosives to tear a whole in the hull, killing 17 soldiers. The next day a bomb exploded at the British embassy in Sana'a but resulted in no casualties.
2004	June 18	Police crack down on Zaidi demonstrators in capital and arrest large numbers. Fearing the followers of Hussein Badreddin al-Houthi to be an imminent treat and using claims that they were setting up unlicensed religious centers and engaging in violent demonstrations against the US and Israel, President Selah sends troops to northern province of Sa'ada to locate Sheikh al-Houthi and his followers. Resistance by Houti followers triggers Shia insurgency.
2004	September 10	Yemen interior and defense ministries announce that Sheikh al-Houthi had been killed with a number of his aides. The government earlier claimed that it had "crushed" the Houthi rebellion, but the conflict would continue until the present,"characterized by continuous fighting of varying intensity, punctuated by multiple ceasefires and mediation attempts" (the government counted six phases of "active fighting" by 2010).
2009	Week of December 13	US begins air strikes on suspected Al-Qaeda personnel and locations at the request of Yemen government.
2010	October 29	Two packages, each containing a bomb consisting of 300 to 400 grams (11–14 oz) of plastic explosives and a detonating mechanism, were found on separate cargo planes in transport from Yemen to the United States, an incident since referred to as "the October 2010 (Yemen) incident".
2011	March 18	Jumaa al-Karama (Friday of Dignity): Massacre of protestors against President Ali Abdullah Saleh leads to massive protests and the revolution that would end his 22-year rule.
2011	June 3	After months of peaceful protest against his rule, President Saleh narrowly survives an attack by mortar against a mosque at the presidential compound.
2011	November 23	In ceremony in Riyadh President Saleh and opposition politicians sign Gulf Cooperation Council brokered deal, whereby President Saleh would step down, transfer executive power to Vice President Hadi and a national unity cabinet would be formed.
2011	December 7	Pursuant to November 23 agreement, Yemen forms unity government under Prime Minister Mohammed Basindawa made up balanced between the ruling General People's Congress Party and the opposition.
2012	February 21	In election to replace President Saleh, Vice President Abdrabbuh Mansur Hadi receives 99.6% of the vote in uncontested race. Despite lack of choice, turnout said to be higher than expected.
2013	March 18	National Dialogue, a conference brokered by the Gulf Cooperation Council and endorsed by the United Nations and made up of over 500 delegates representing the wide array of the political spectrum conveneded to draft a new constitution for Yemen, begins. President Hadi says that the unrest in the south is the most difficult issue before them.
2014	September 21	Houthi rebels sign peace agreement brokered by UN envoy Jamal Benomar designed to give the rebels participation in new government and result in withdrawal of rebel military forces from Sana'a. The next day the rebel forces consolidated their hold on the capital.
2014	October 9	Hours after Houthis force Prime Minister-designate Ahmed Awad bin Mubarak to turn down post, suicide bomber detonates bomb near Tahir Square in Sana'a just as a Houthi rally was to begin. Al-Qaeda in the Arabian Peninsula takes credit for the attack.
2015	January 22	Following resignation of cabinet and prime minister Khaled Bahah Yemen's president Abd Rabbuh Mansur Hadi resigns in the face of control of the capital by rebel Huthi forces, which had besieged his residence and abducted his chief of staff, Ahmed Awad bin Mubarak.
2015	February 6	Houthi rebels announce that they have dissolved parliament and installed a five-member "presidential council" which will form a transitional government to govern for two years which would include a transitional national council of 551 members. The UN refused to acknowledge the "unilateral" announcement.
2015	March 25	At a new conference by its ambassador to the US, Saudi Arabia announces the beginning of "Operation Storm of Resolve" involving airstrikes against Houthi rebel targets in and near Sana'a. Saudi Arabian television reported that the UAE, Bahrain, Kuwait, Qatar, Jordan, Morocco and Sudan were sending aircraft, and Egypt, Jordan, Sudan and Pakistan were willing to send ground troops. The US said it was providing "logistical and intelligence support".
2016	early October	A cholera outbreak began predominantly in Sanaa, and killed more than 4000 people by 2022.
2017	December 4	Ali Abdullah Saleh killed two days after publicly breaking with the Houthis. Aides said he died after an explosion at his home in Sanaa; the Houthis said they had killed him in an ambush in the desert.

== See also ==
- Timeline of Aden
- Timeline of Sanaa

== Sources ==
- Commins, David (2010). "Saudi Arabia, southern Arabia and the Gulf states from the First World War". In Robinson, Francis (ed.). The New Cambridge History of Islam, Volume 5: The Islamic World in the Age of Western Dominance. Cambridge: Cambridge University Press. pp. 451–480. ISBN 978-0-521-83826-9.
- Paul Dresch (2000). "Brief Chronology". History of Modern Yemen. Cambridge University Press. ISBN 978-0-521-79482-4.
- Europa Publications (2003). "Yemen". Political Chronology of the Middle East. Routledge. ISBN 978-1-135-35673-6.
- Robert D. Burrowes (2010). "Chronology". Historical Dictionary of Yemen (2nd ed.). Scarecrow Press. ISBN 978-0-8108-5528-1.
- Hathaway, Jane (2006). "The forgotten province: A prelude to the Ottoman era in Yemen". In Wasserstein, David J.; Ayalon, Ami (eds.). Mamluks and Ottomans: Studies in Honour of Michael Winter. Routledge. pp. 195–205.
- Haykel, Bernard (2010). "Western Arabia and Yemen during the Ottoman period". In Fierro, Maribel (ed.). The New Cambridge History of Islam, Volume 2: The Western Islamic World, Eleventh to Eighteenth Centuries. Cambridge: Cambridge University Press. pp. 436–450. ISBN 978-0-521-83957-0.
- Landau-Tasseron, Ella (2010). "Arabia". In Robinson, Chase F. (ed.). The New Cambridge History of Islam, Volume 1: The Formation of the Islamic World, Sixth to Eleventh Centuries. Cambridge: Cambridge University Press. pp. 397–447. ISBN 978-0-521-83823-8.
- Peskes, Esther (2010). "Western Arabia and Yemen (fifth/eleventh century to the Ottoman conquest)". In Fierro, Maribel (ed.). The New Cambridge History of Islam, Volume 2: The Western Islamic World, Eleventh to Eighteenth Centuries. Cambridge: Cambridge University Press. pp. 285–297. ISBN 978-0-521-83957-0.
- Smith, G. Rex (1987). "Politische Geschichte des islamischen Jemen bis zur ersten türkischen Invasion (1 bis 945 Hidschra = 633 bis 1538 n. Chr.)" [Political History of Islamic Yemen until the First Turkish Invasion (1 to 945 AH = 633 to 1538 AD)]. In Daum, Werner (ed.). Jemen. 3000 Jahre Kunst und Kultur des glücklichen Arabien [Yemen. 3000 Years of Art and Civilisation in Arabia Felix]. Innsbruck and Frankfurt a.M.: Pinguin. pp. 136–154. ISBN 3-7016-2251-5.
