= President of Yemen =

Head of state

President of the Presidential Leadership Council of the Republic of Yemen
- Presidential Standard

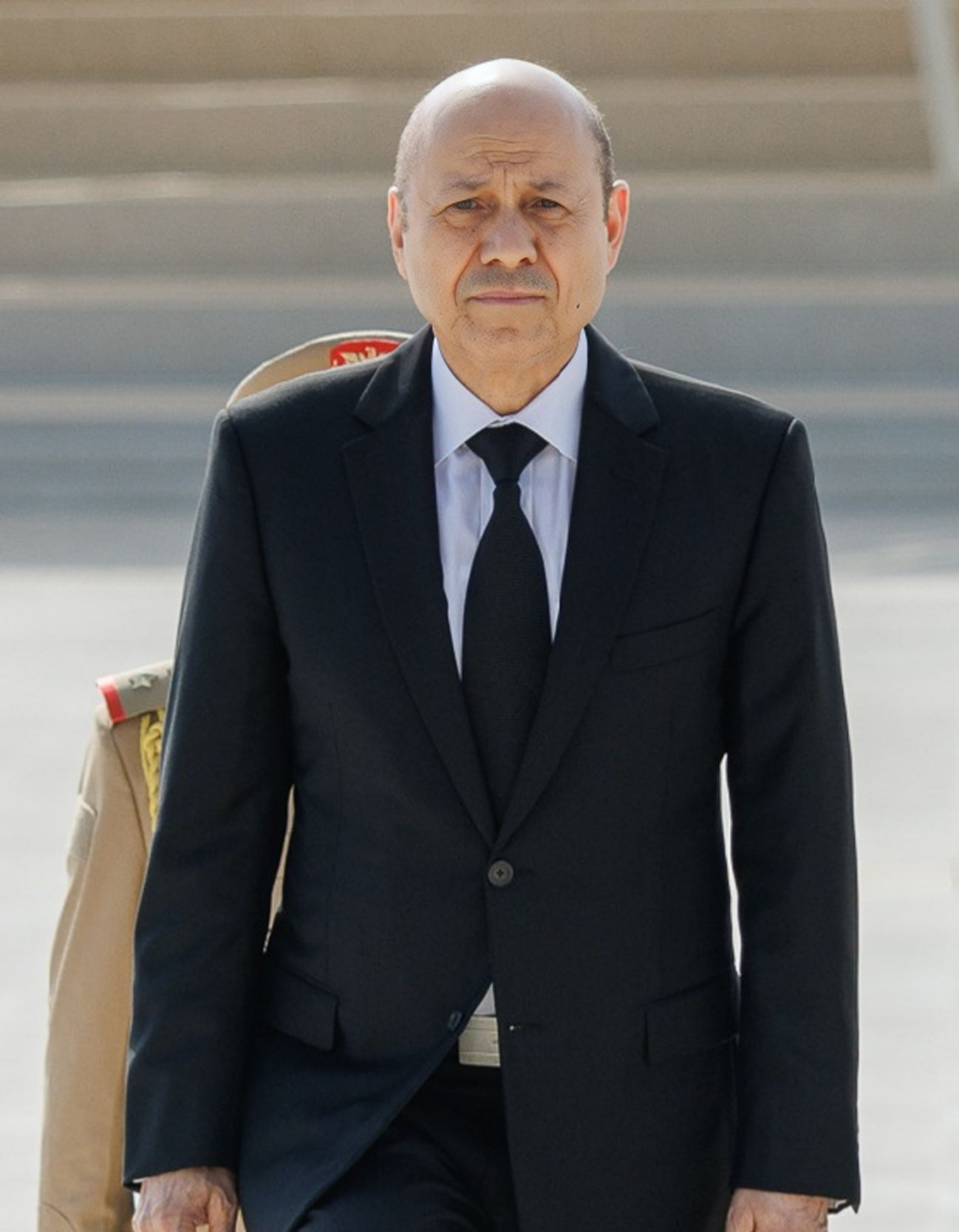
- Incumbent; Rashad al-Alimi since 7 April 2022 Claimed by Mahdi al-Mashat (Supreme Political Council (Houthis)) since 25 April 2018
- Presidential Leadership Council
- Residence: Ma'shiq Palace (PLC)
- Seat: Aden (PLC); Sanaa (SPC)
- Inaugural holder: Ali Abdullah Saleh
- Formation: 22 May 1990; 36 years ago
- Deputy: Vice-Presidents
- Salary: 280,000 YER monthly (2011)
- Website: presidentalalimi.net (PLC)

The president of the Republic of Yemen (Arabic: رئيس الجمهورية اليمنية) is the head of state of Yemen. Under the Constitution of Yemen, the president is also the Supreme Commander of the Armed Forces and head of the executive branch of the Yemeni government.

As of 7 April 2022, the powers of the president are exercised by the Presidential Leadership Council, headed by a chairman. The chairman of the Presidential Leadership Council is vested with sweeping powers, including the ability to unilaterally command the military and appoint governors and other key officials.

The first and longest-serving president of unified Yemen was Ali Abdullah Saleh and the second was Abdrabbuh Mansur Hadi, who took office on 27 February 2012. The legality of his claim to presidency is in question, as he was the only candidate in the 2012 election and the end of his mandate was originally set for 27 February 2014. His mandate was extended for another year. However, he remained in power after the expiration of his mandate, and on 22 January 2015, he handed over his resignation. He reaffirmed that he intended on resigning two weeks later. After his resignation, the government was assumed by the Houthi Supreme Revolutionary Committee. However, on 21 February 2015, Hadi presented himself as the president again, in Aden. On 7 April 2022, in a televised address, Hadi resigned, dismissed Vice President Ali Mohsen al-Ahmar, and transferred the powers of the president and vice president to the Presidential Leadership Council, with Rashad al-Alimi, former interior minister under President Saleh, as its chairman. Right after assuming his office, al-Alimi met King Salman and Crown Prince Mohammed, during an official visit to Saudi Arabia on 29 April 2022 for support of all peace efforts in Yemen and the region.

The Hadi faction's claim to the presidency is contested by the Houthi Supreme Political Council's chairman, Mahdi al-Mashat, who is only recognized by Iran.

== Latest election ==
Candidate	Party	Votes	%
Abdrabbuh Mansur Hadi	General People's Congress	6,621,921	100.00
Total		6,621,921	100.00
Valid votes		6,621,921	99.80
Invalid/blank votes		13,271	0.20
Total votes		6,635,192	100.00
Registered voters/turnout		10,243,364	64.78
Source: IFES

== See also ==
- President of Yemen Arab Republic (North Yemen)
- List of heads of state of Yemen
- List of leaders of South Yemen
