= Bajamal Cabinet 2003 =

Government of Yemen from 2003 to 2006

Second Bajamal Cabinet
- 6th Council of Ministers of Yemen
- 2003–2006
- Date formed: 17 May 2003
- Date dissolved: 11 February 2006

People and organisations
- President: Ali Abdullah Saleh
- Prime Minister: Abdul Qadir Bajamal
- Deputy Prime Minister: Alawi Saleh al-Salami; Ahmed Mohammed Sufan
- No. of ministers: 35
- Member party: General People's Congress
- Status in legislature: Supermajority
- Opposition parties: Al-Islah; Yemeni Socialist Party; NUPO; Arab Socialist Ba'ath Party

History
- Election: 2003 Yemeni parliamentary election
- Legislature term: 3rd Legislature
- Predecessor: First Bajamal Cabinet
- Successor: Mujawar Cabinet

The Second Bajamal Cabinet was the 6th Council of Ministers of the Republic of Yemen, led by Prime Minister Abdul Qadir Bajamal of the General People's Congress. It was formed on 17 May 2003, following the 2003 parliamentary election, in which the GPC secured a strong majority. The cabinet served until 11 February 2006.

Bajamal’s second cabinet remained in office until a reshuffle in early 2006, when it was succeeded by the Mujawar Cabinet.

== Composition ==
Portfolio	Minister	Took office	Left office	Party
Prime Minister	Abdul Qadir Bajamal	17 May 2003	11 February 2006	GPC
Deputy Prime Minister; Minister of Finance	Alawi Saleh al-Salami	17 May 2003	11 February 2006	GPC
Deputy Prime Minister; Minister of Planning and International Cooperation	Ahmed Mohammed Sufan	17 May 2003	11 February 2006	GPC
Minister of Foreign Affairs	Abu Bakr al-Qirbi	17 May 2003	11 February 2006	GPC
Minister of Defense	Abdullah Ali Alewa	17 May 2003	11 February 2006	GPC
Minister of Interior	Rashad al-Alimi	17 May 2003	11 February 2006	GPC
Minister of Information	Hussein al-Awadhi	17 May 2003	11 February 2006	GPC
Minister of Electricity and Energy	Yahya al-Abyadh	17 May 2003	11 February 2006	GPC
Minister of Youth and Sports	Abdulrahman al-Akwa'a	17 May 2003	11 February 2006	GPC
Minister of Civil Service and Insurance	Hamoud Khaled al-Sufi	17 May 2003	11 February 2006	GPC
Minister of Public Health	Mohammed al-Nuaimi	17 May 2003	11 February 2006	GPC
Minister of Justice	Adnan al-Jafri	17 May 2003	11 February 2006	GPC
Minister of Higher Education and Scientific Research	Abdul Wahab Raweh	17 May 2003	11 February 2006	GPC
Minister of Public Works and Highways	Abdullah al-Dafa'i	17 May 2003	11 February 2006	GPC
Minister of Social Affairs and Labour	Abdulkarim Al-Arhabi	17 May 2003	11 February 2006	GPC
Minister of Tourism	Abdulmalek al-Eryani	17 May 2003	11 February 2006	GPC
Minister of Oil and Minerals	Rashid Barba'a	17 May 2003	11 February 2006	GPC
Minister of Religious Endowments and Guidance	Hamoud Muhammed Ou'bad	17 May 2003	11 February 2006	GPC
Minister of Agriculture and Irrigation	Hasan Swaid	17 May 2003	11 February 2006	Independent
Minister of Technical Education and Vocational Training	Ali Mansour Bin Safah	17 May 2003	11 February 2006	Independent
Minister of Culture	Khaled al-Ruwaishan	17 May 2003	11 February 2006	Independent
Minister of Transport	Omar al-Amawdi	17 May 2003	11 February 2006	Independent
Minister of Human Rights	Amat Al Alim Alsoswa	17 May 2003	11 February 2006	Independent
Minister of Legal Affairs	Rashad al-Rasas	17 May 2003	11 February 2006	GPC
Minister of Local Administration	Sadeq Amin Abu Rass	17 May 2003	11 February 2006	GPC
Minister of Fisheries Wealth	Ali Hasan al-Ahmadi	17 May 2003	11 February 2006	GPC
Minister of Telecommunications & Information Technology	Abdulmalik al-Mualami	17 May 2003	11 February 2006	Independent
Minister of Industry and Trade	Khaled Rajeh Sheikh	17 May 2003	11 February 2006	Independent
Minister of Water and Environment	Mohammed Lutf al-Iryani	17 May 2003	11 February 2006	Independent
Minister of Education	Abdulsalam al-Jawfi	17 May 2003	11 February 2006	GPC
Minister of Expatriates Affairs	Abdu Ali Al-Qubati	17 May 2003	11 February 2006	Independent
Minister of State; Secretary General of the Presidency of the Republic	Abdullah Hussein al-Bashiri	17 May 2003	11 February 2006	GPC
Minister of State; Mayor of Sanaa	Ahmed Mohammed al-Kohlani	17 May 2003	11 February 2006	GPC
Ministers of State; Ministers without portfolio	Qasem al-Ajam	17 May 2003	11 February 2006	Independent
Ministers of State; Ministers without portfolio	Mohammed Ali Yaser	17 May 2003	11 February 2006	GPC
Minister of State for Parliamentary Affairs and the Shura Council	Mohammed Yahya al-Sharafi	17 May 2003	11 February 2006	GPC

== See also ==
- Politics of Yemen
