= Bajamal Cabinet 2001 =

Cabinets of Yemen

- Cabinet of Yemen
- Date formed: 4 April 2001
- Date dissolved: 16 May 2003

People and organisations
- Head of state: Ali Abdullah Saleh
- Head of government: Abdul Qadir Bajamal

History
- Predecessor: Al-Iryani Cabinet
- Successor: Bajamal Cabinet 2003

First Bajamal cabinet was the cabinet of Yemen led by Yemeni prime minister Abdul Qadir Bajamal from 4 April 2001 to 16 May 2003.

== List of ministers ==
← Government → ( 4 April 2001 – 16 May 2003 )
Office	Portrait	Name	Took office	Left office	Alliance/party
Prime Minister		Abdul Qadir Bajamal			GPC
Deputy Prime Minister, Minister of Finance		Alawi Saleh al-Salami			GPC
Minister of Foreign Affairs		Abu Bakr al-Qirbi			GPC
Minister of Defense		Abdullah Ali Alewa			GPC
Minister of Interior		Rashad Mohammed al-Alimi			GPC
Minister of Information		Husseni Dhaifullah al-Awadhi			GPC
Minister of Electricity and Water		Yahya al-Abyad			
Minister of Youth and Sport		Abdulrahman al-Akwa'a			GPC
Minister of Civil Service and Insurance		Abdulwahab Raweh			GPC
Minister of State for Parliamentary Affairs and the Shura Council		Alawi Hussein Attas			GPC
Minister of Health		Abdulnaser Munaibari			
Minister of Justice		Ahmed Aqabat			
Minister of Higher Education and Scientific Research		Yahya al-Shuaibi			GPC
Minister of Public Works and Urban Development		Abdullah al-Dafa'i			GPC
Minister of Social Affairs and Labour		Abdulkarim Al-Arhabi			
Minister of Tourism and Environment		Abdulmalek al-Eryani			GPC
Minister of Oil and Minerals		Rashid Barba'a			GPC
Minister of Religious Endowments and Guidance		Qasem al-Ajam			
Minister of Agriculture and Irrigation		Ahmed Salem al-Jabeli			GPC
Minister of Technical Education and Vocational		Mohammed Abdullah al-Batani			GPC
Minister of Culture		Abdulwahab al-Rawhani			GPC
Minister of Transport and Maritime Affairs		Saeed Yafa'i			
Minister of State for Human Rights		Wahibah Farea			
Minister of State and member of the cabinet		Mohsen al-Yusifi			
Minister of State and member of the cabinet		Mohammed Ali Yaser			GPC
Minister of State and General Security for the Presidency of the Republic		Abdullah Hussein al-Bashiri			GPC
Minister of State and member of the cabinet		Khaled al-Sharif			GPC
Minister of Legal Affairs		Abdullah Ahmed Ghanem			
Minister of Local Administration		Sadeq Ameen Abu Ras			GPC
Minister of Fisheries Wealth		Ali Hasan al-Ahmadi			GPC
Minister of Telecommunications		Abdulmalek al-Mualami			
Minister of Industry and Trade		Mohammed Ali Othman			GPC
Minister of Education		Fadhel abu Ghanem			
Minister of Expatriates Affairs		Abdu Ali Al-Qubati			

== See also ==
- Politics of Yemen
