= Al-Iryani Cabinet =

Government of Yemen from 1998 to 2001

- 4th Cabinet of Yemen

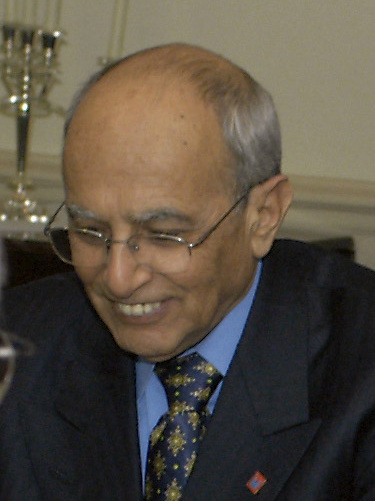
- Date formed: 16 May 1998
- Date dissolved: 3 March 2001

People and organisations
- President: Ali Abdullah Saleh
- Prime Minister: Abdul-Karim Al-Iryani
- Deputy Prime Minister: Ali Muhammad Mujawar
- Member party: General People's Congress
- Status in legislature: Majority
- Opposition parties: Al-Islah; NUPO; Arab Socialist Ba'ath Party

History
- Legislature term: 2nd Legislature
- Predecessor: Bin Ghanem Cabinet
- Successor: First Bajamal Cabinet

Al-Iryani cabinet was the cabinet of Yemen formed by Abdulkarim al-Eryani from 16 May 1998 to 3 March 2001.

== List of ministers ==
Office	
Prime Minister	Abd Al-Karim Al-Iryani
Deputy Prime Minister, Minister of Foreign Affairs	Abdul Qadir Bajamal
Minister of Finance	Alawi Saleh al-Salami
Minister of Defense	Mohammed Dhaifullah Mohammed
Minister of Interior	Hussein Arab
Minister of Information	Abdulrahman al-Akwa'a
Minister of Electricity and Water	Ali Hameed Sharaf
Minister of Youth and Sport	Abdulwahab Raweh
Minister of Civil Service and Insurance	Mohammed Abdullah al-Batani
Minister of Health	Abdullah Abdulwali Nasher
Minister of Justice	Ismael Ahmed al-Wazir
Minister of Development and Planning	Ahmed Mohammed Sufan
Minister of Public Works and Urban Planning	Abdullah al-Dafa'i
Minister of Labour and Technical Training	Mohammed al-Taib
Minister of Oil and Minerals	Mohamad Khadim Al Wajih
Minister of Religious Endowments and Guidance	Ahmed Mohammed al-Shami
Minister of Agriculture and Irrigation	Ahmed Salem al-Jabli
Minister of Culture and Tourism	Abdulmalek Mansour
Minister of Transport	Abdulmalek al-Sanabani
Minister of State for the cabinet affairs	Mutaher Abdullah al-Saeed
Minister of State and member of the cabinet	Faisal Mahmoud Hassan ALi
Minister of Legal Affairs and Parliament Affairs	Abdullah Ahmed Ghanem
Minister of Local Administration	Sadeq Ameen Abu Ras
Minister of Fisheries Wealth	Ahmed Musaed Hussein
Minister of Telecommunications	Ahmed Mohammed al-Ansi
Minister of Industry and Trade	Abdulrahman Ali Othman
Minister of Trade	Abdulaziz al-Kumaim
Minister of Education	Yahya al-Shuaibi
Minister of Expatriates Affairs	Ahmed al-Bashari

== See also ==
- Politics of Yemen
