= Mujawar Cabinet =

Government of Yemen from 2007 to 2011

- 7th Cabinet of Yemen
- Date formed: 6 April 2007
- Date dissolved: 20 March 2011

People and organisations
- President: Ali Abdullah Saleh
- Prime Minister: Ali Muhammad Mujawar
- Deputy Prime Ministers: Rashad al-Alimi; Abdulkarim Al-Arhabi
- Member party: General People's Congress
- Status in legislature: Supermajority
- Opposition parties: Al-Islah; Yemeni Socialist Party; NUPO; Arab Socialist Ba'ath Party

History
- Legislature term: 3rd Legislature
- Predecessor: Second Bajamal Cabinet
- Successor: Basindawa Cabinet

The Mujawar Cabinet, led by Yemeni prime minister Ali Mohammed Mujawar took the constitutional oath before president Ali Abdullah Saleh on 7 April 2007. The cabinet was made up of 33 ministers.

== List of ministers ==
← Government → ( 6 April 2007 – 20 March 2011)
| Office | Portrait | Name | Took office | Left office | Alliance/party |
|---|---|---|---|---|---|
| Prime Minister | | Ali Mohammed Mujawar | | | |
| Deputy Prime Minister | | Rashad Mohammed al-Alimi | | | GPC |
| Deputy Prime Minister for Economic Affairs | | Abdul-Karim Ismail al-Arhabi | | | GPC |
| Minister of Foreign Affairs | | Abu Bakr al-Qirbi | | | GPC |
| Minister of Defense | | Mohammed Nasser Ahmed | | | GPC |
| Minister of Interior | | Rashad Mohammed al-Alimi ( 7 April 2007 - 9 May 2008) Mutaher al-Masri ( 9 May 2008 - 7 December 2011) | | | GPC |
| Minister of Finance | | Noaman al-Suhaibi | | | |
| Minister of Information | | Hassan Ahmed al-Lawzi | | | GPC |
| Minister of Electricity and Energy | | Mustafa Yahya Buhran | | | |
| Minister of Youth and Sport | | Hamoud Mohammed Ubad | | | GPC |
| Minister of Civil Service and Insurance | | Hamoud Khalid al-Soufi | | | GPC |
| Minister of State for Parliamentary Affairs and the Shura Council | | Adnan Umar al-Jafri | | | |
| Minister of Health | | Abdul-Karim Rase | | | |
| Minister of Justice | | Ghazi Shaif al-Aghbari | | | |
| Minister of Higher Education and Scientific Research | | Saleh Ali Ba Surrah | | | |
| Minister of Public Works and Highways | | Umar Abdullah al-Kurshumi | | | |
| Minister of Social Affairs and Labour | | Amat al-Razzaq Ali Hamad | | | |
| Minister of Tourism | | Nabil Hasan al-Faqih | | | GPC |
| Minister of Oil and Minerals | | Khalid Mahfoud Bahah | | | GPC |
| Minister of Religious Endowments and Guidance | | Hamoud abdul-Hamid al-Hitar | | | |
| Minister of Agriculture and Irrigation | | Mansour Ahmed al-Hawshabi | | | |
| Minister of Technical Education and Vocational | | Ibrahim Umar Hajri | | | |
| Minister of Culture | | Mohammed Abu Bakr al-Maflahi | | | |
| Minister of Transport | | Khalid Ibrahim al-Wazir | | | |
| Minister of Human Rights | | Huda Abdul-Latif al-Ban | | | |
| Minister of State and Mayor of Sana'a | | Yahya Mohammed al-Shaibi | | | GPC |
| Minister of Legal Affairs | | Rashad Ahmed al-Rassas | | | GPC |
| Minister of Local Administration | | Abdul-Qadir Ali Hilal | | | GPC |
| Minister of Fisheries Wealth | | Mahmoud Ibrahim al-Saghiri | | | |
| Minister of Planning and International Cooperation | | Abdul-Karim Ismail al-Arhabi | | | GPC |
| Minister of Telecommunications & Information Technology | | Kamal Hussein al-Jabri | | | |
| Minister of Industry and Trade | | Yahya al-Mutawakel | | | |
| Minister of Water and Environment | | Abdul-Rahman Fadhl al-Iryani | | | |
| Minister of Education | | Abdul-Salam Mohammed al-Jawfi | | | GPC |
| Minister of Expatriates Affairs | | Saleh Hasan Sumai | | | GPC |

== See also ==
- Politics of Yemen
