= Bin Ghanem Cabinet =

Government of Yemen from 1997 to 1998

- 3rd Council of Ministers of Yemen
- 1997–1998
- Date formed: 15 September 1997
- Date dissolved: 15 May 1998

People and organisations
- President: Ali Abdullah Saleh
- Prime Minister: Faraj Said Bin Ghanem
- Deputy Prime Minister: Abdul-Karim Al-Iryani
- No. of ministers: 29
- Member party: General People's Congress
- Status in legislature: Majority
- Opposition parties: Al-Islah; NUPO; Arab Socialist Ba'ath Party

History
- Election: 1997 parliamentary election
- Legislature term: 2nd Legislature
- Predecessor: Abdulghani Cabinet
- Successor: Al-Iryani Cabinet

The Bin Ghanem Cabinet was the third Council of Ministers of the Republic of Yemen formed after the country's unification. It was led by Faraj Said Bin Ghanem, an independent technocrat, who served as Prime Minister from 1997 to 1998. Bin Ghanem was appointed following the 1997 parliamentary election, which had resulted in a decisive majority for the ruling General People's Congress under President Ali Abdullah Saleh.

The cabinet was dissolved with the dismissal of Bin Ghanem in May 1998, when he was succeeded by Deputy Prime Minister Abdul Karim al-Iryani.

== Composition ==
Cabinet members
Portfolio	Minister	Took office	Left office	Party
Prime Minister	Faraj Said Bin Ghanem	15 September 1997	15 May 1998	Independent
Deputy Prime Minister; Minister of Foreign Affairs	Abdul-Karim Al-Iryani	15 September 1997	15 May 1998	GPC
Minister of Defense	Mohammed Dhaifullah Mohammed	15 September 1997	15 May 1998	GPC
Minister of Interior	Hussein Arab	15 September 1997	15 May 1998	GPC
Minister of Finance	Alawi Saleh al-Salami	15 September 1997	15 May 1998	GPC
Minister of Information	Abdulrahman al-Akwa'a	15 September 1997	15 May 1998	Independent
Minister of Electricity and Water	Ali Hameed Sharaf	15 September 1997	15 May 1998	GPC
Minister of Youth and Sports	Abdulwahab Raweh	15 September 1997	15 May 1998	GPC
Minister of Civil Service and Administration Reform	Mohammed Ahmed al-Junaid	15 September 1997	15 May 1998	GPC
Minister of Public Health	Abdullah Abdulwali Nasher	15 September 1997	15 May 1998	Independent
Minister of Justice	Ismael Ahmed al-Wazir	15 September 1997	15 May 1998	GPC
Minister of Labor and Technical Training	Mohammed Abdullah al-Batani	15 September 1997	15 May 1998	GPC
Minister of Culture and Tourism	Abdulmalek Mansour	15 September 1997	15 May 1998	GPC
Minister of Oil and Minerals	Mohamad Khadim Al Wajih	15 September 1997	15 May 1998	GPC
Minister of Religious Endowments and Guidance	Ahmed Mohammed al-Shami	15 September 1997	15 May 1998	Party of Truth
Minister of Agriculture and Irrigation	Ahmed Salem al-Jabli	15 September 1997	15 May 1998	GPC
Minister of Transport	Abdulmalik al-Sayani	15 September 1997	15 May 1998	GPC
Minister of Legal and Parliamentary Affairs	Abdullah Ahmed Ghanem	15 September 1997	15 May 1998	GPC
Minister of Local Administration	Sadeq Amin Abu Rass	15 September 1997	15 May 1998	GPC
Minister of Fisheries Wealth	Ahmed Musaed Hussein	15 September 1997	15 May 1998	GPC
Minister of Development and Planning	Ali Muhammad Mujawar	15 September 1997	15 May 1998	GPC
Minister of Telecommunications	Ahmed Mohammed al-Ansi	15 September 1997	15 May 1998	GPC
Minister of Housing and Urban Planning	Abdullah al-Dafa'i	15 September 1997	15 May 1998	GPC
Minister of Industry	Ahmed Mohammed Sufan	15 September 1997	15 May 1998	GPC
Minister of Trade	Abdulrahman Ali Othman	15 September 1997	15 May 1998	GPC
Minister of Education	Yahya al-Shuaibi	15 September 1997	15 May 1998	GPC
Minister of Expatriates Affairs	Abdullah Saleh Saba'a	15 September 1997	15 May 1998	Independent
Minister of Insurance and Social Affairs	Mohammed Abdullah al-Batani	15 September 1997	15 May 1998	GPC
Minister of State for Cabinet Affairs	Ahmed al-Bashari	15 September 1997	15 May 1998	GPC

== See also ==
- Politics of Yemen
