= Abdulghani Cabinet =

Government of Yemen from 1994 to 1997

- 2nd Council of Ministers of Yemen
- 1994–1997
- Date formed: 6 October 1994
- Date dissolved: 14 May 1997

People and organisations
- President: Ali Abdullah Saleh
- Prime Minister: Abdul Aziz Abdul Ghani
- Deputy Prime Ministers: Abd al-Wahab al-Anisi; Abdul-Karim Al-Iryani; Muhammad Said al-Attar; Abdul Qadir Bajamal
- No. of ministers: 27
- Member parties: General People's Congress; Al-Islah
- Status in legislature: Majority (Coalition)
- Opposition parties: Yemeni Socialist Party; Arab Socialist Ba'ath Party; Party of Truth; NUPO; Nasserist Reform Organisation; Democratic Nasserist Party

History
- Legislature term: 1st Legislature
- Predecessor: Attas Cabinet
- Successor: Bin Ghanem Cabinet

The Abdulghani Cabinet was the second Council of Ministers of the Republic of Yemen following the 1994 civil war. It was led by Prime Minister Abdul Aziz Abdul Ghani of the General People's Congress and served from 1994 to 1997. Abdul Ghani, a veteran politician, had previously served as the last Prime Minister of the Yemen Arab Republic (North Yemen) prior to unification in 1990.

The cabinet was formed in the aftermath of the 1994 civil war, which ended with the defeat of southern secessionist forces and the consolidation of power by President Ali Abdullah Saleh and his northern allies. The government was tasked with restoring political order, rebuilding national institutions, and integrating the state apparatus under the sole authority of the central government in Sanaa. The government remained in office until it was succeeded by the Bin Ghanem Cabinet in 1997.

== Composition ==
Portfolio	Minister	Took office	Left office	Party
Prime Minister	Abdul Aziz Abdul Ghani	6 October 1994	14 May 1997	GPC
Deputy Prime Minister	Abd al-Wahab al-Anisi	6 October 1994	14 May 1997	Al-Islah
Deputy Prime Minister; Minister of Foreign Affairs	Alawi Saleh al-Salami	6 October 1994	14 May 1997	GPC
Deputy Prime Minister; Minister of Industry	Mohammed Saeed Al-Attar	6 October 1994	14 May 1997	GPC
Deputy Prime Minister; Minister of Planning and Development	Alawi Saleh al-Salami	6 October 1994	14 May 1997	GPC
Minister of Interior	Yahya al-Mwtawaki	6 October 1994	13 December 1995	GPC
Minister of Interior	Hussein Arab	13 December 1995	14 May 1997	GPC
Minister of Finance	Mohammed Ahmed al-Junaid	6 October 1994	14 May 1997	GPC
Minister of Defense	Abdulmalek al-Sayani	6 October 1994	14 May 1997	GPC
Minister of Information	Mohammed Salem Basindwah	6 October 1994	13 December 1995	Independent
Minister of Information	Abdulrahman al-Akwa'a	13 December 1995	14 May 1997	GPC
Minister of Electricity and Water	Abdullah Mohsen al-Akwa	6 October 1994	14 May 1997	Al-Islah
Minister of Youth and Sports	Abdulwahab Raweh	6 October 1994	14 May 1997	GPC
Minister of Civil Service and Administration Reform	Sadeq Ameen Abu Ras	6 October 1994	14 May 1997	GPC
Minister of Public Health	Najib Saeed Ghanem	6 October 1994	14 May 1997	Al-Islah
Minister of Justice	Abdulwahab al-Daylami	6 October 1994	14 May 1997	Al-Islah
Minister of Insurance, Social Affairs and Labor	Mohammed Abdullah al-Batani	6 October 1994	14 May 1997	GPC
Minister of Culture and Tourism	Yahya Hussein al-Arashi	6 October 1994	14 May 1997	GPC
Minister of Oil and Minerals	Faisal bin Shamlan	6 October 1994	14 May 1997	Independent
Minister of Endowments and Guidance	Ghaleb al-Qurashi	6 October 1994	14 May 1997	Al-Islah
Minister of Agriculture and Irrigation	Ahmed Salem al-Jabli	6 October 1994	14 May 1997	GPC
Minister of Transport	Ahmed Musaed Hussein	6 October 1994	14 May 1997	GPC
Minister of Local Administration	Mohammed Hassan Damaj	6 October 1994	14 May 1997	Al-Islah
Minister of Fisheries Wealth	Abdulrahman Bafadhel	6 October 1994	14 May 1997	Al-Islah
Minister of Telecommunications	Ahmed al-Ansi	6 October 1994	14 May 1997	GPC
Minister of Supply and Trade	Mohammed Jubari	6 October 1994	13 December 1995	Al-Islah
Minister of Supply and Trade	Muhammad Ahmad Effendi	13 December 1995	14 May 1997	Al-Islah
Minister of Education	Abduh Ali Qubati	6 October 1994	14 May 1997	Independent
Minister of Construction, Housing and Urban Planning	Ali Hamid Sharaf	6 October 1994	14 May 1997	GPC
Minister of State for Expatriate Affairs	Fadl Muhammad bin Eid al-Afifi	6 October 1994	14 May 1997	GPC

== See also ==
- Politics of Yemen
