= Attas Cabinet =

Government of Yemen from 1990 to 1994

- 1st Council of Ministers of Yemen
- 1990–1994
- Date formed: 24 May 1990
- Date dissolved: 29 May 1994

People and organisations
- President: Ali Abdullah Saleh
- Prime Minister: Haidar Abu Bakr al-Attas
- First Deputy Prime Minister: Hassan Muhammad Makki
- No. of ministers: 40
- Member parties: General People's Congress; Yemeni Socialist Party; Arab Socialist Ba'ath Party
- Status in legislature: Majority (Coalition)
- Opposition parties: Al-Islah; Party of Truth; NUPO; Nasserist Reform Organisation; Democratic Nasserist Party

History
- Election: 1993 parliamentary election
- Legislature term: 1st Legislature
- Successor: Abdulghani Cabinet

The Attas Cabinet was the first Council of Ministers of the Republic of Yemen following the unification of North and South Yemen on 22 May 1990. It was headed by Prime Minister Haidar Abu Bakr al-Attas, a senior figure in the Yemeni Socialist Party and former Chairman of the Presidium of the Supreme People's Council of South Yemen. The cabinet was formed on 24 May 1990 and served until 29 May 1994.

Composed of 40 ministers, the Attas Cabinet was a power-sharing government that brought together officials from both the Yemen Arab Republic (North Yemen) and the People’s Democratic Republic of Yemen (South Yemen), in an effort to integrate the political and administrative structures of the formerly separate states.

The government oversaw the early years of unification, during which time Yemen adopted its constitution and held its first multi-party parliamentary elections in 1993. However, the cabinet government faced mounting political tensions between northern and southern factions, culminating in the 1994 civil war. The cabinet was dismissed by President Ali Abdullah Saleh at the outbreak of the conflict, which ultimately resulted in the defeat of southern forces.

== Composition ==
Portfolio	Minister	Took office	Left office	Party
Prime Minister	Haidar Abu Bakr al-Attas	24 May 1990	29 May 1994	YSP
First Deputy Prime Minister	Hassan Muhammad Makki	24 May 1990	29 May 1994	GPC
Deputy Prime Minister for Interior Affairs	Mujahed Abu Shawarib	24 May 1990	29 May 1994	Ba'ath Party
Deputy Prime Minister for Defense and Security Affairs	Saleh Obaid Ahmed	24 May 1990	29 May 1994	YSP
Deputy Prime Minister for Manpower Development	Mohammed Haydarah Masdus	24 May 1990	29 May 1994	YSP
Minister of Construction and Development	Abdullah Kurshumi	24 May 1990	29 May 1994	GPC
Minister of Defense	Haitham Qasem Taher	24 May 1990	29 May 1994	YSP
Minister of Interior	Ghaleb al-Qamesh	24 May 1990	29 May 1994	GPC
Minister of Finance	Alawi Saleh al-Salami	24 May 1990	29 May 1994	GPC
Minister of Information	Mohammed Ahmed Jurhum	24 May 1990	29 May 1994	YSP
Minister of Electricity and Water	Abdulwahab Mahmoud	24 May 1990	29 May 1994	GPC
Minister of Youth and Sports	Mohammed al-Kabab	24 May 1990	29 May 1994	GPC
Minister of Civil Service and Administration Reform	Mohamad Khadim Al Wajih	24 May 1990	29 May 1994	GPC
Minister of Public Health	Mohammed Ali Muqbel	24 May 1990	29 May 1994	GPC
Minister of Justice	Abdulwasa Salam	24 May 1990	29 May 1994	YSP
Minister of Insurance, Social Affairs and Labor	Ahmed Luqman	24 May 1990	29 May 1994	GPC
Minister of Culture	Hasan al-Lawzi	24 May 1990	29 May 1994	GPC
Minister of Tourism	Mahmoud al-Arasi	24 May 1990	29 May 1994	YSP
Minister of Religious Endowments and Guidance	Mohsen Mohammed al-Ulifi	24 May 1990	29 May 1994	GPC
Minister of Agriculture and Irrigation	Sadeq Amin Abu Rass	24 May 1990	29 May 1994	GPC
Minister of Transport	Saleh Abdullah Muthana	24 May 1990	29 May 1994	YSP
Minister of Legal Affairs	Mohammed Saeed Abdullah	17 May 2003	11 February 2006	YSP
Minister of Local Administration	Mohammed Saeed Abdullah	24 May 1990	29 May 1994	YSP
Minister of Fisheries Wealth	Salem Jubran	24 May 1990	29 May 1994	Independent
Minister of Telecommunications	Ahmed al-Ansi	24 May 1990	29 May 1994	GPC
Minister of Trade	Fadhel Mohsen	24 May 1990	29 May 1994	YSP
Minister of Education	Mohammed al-Jayfi	24 May 1990	29 May 1994	GPC
Minister of Expatriates Affairs	Saleh Munaser	24 May 1990	29 May 1994	YSP
Minister of State	Mohsen al-Hamdani	24 May 1990	29 May 1994	GPC
Minister of State for Cabinet Affairs	Yahya Hussein al-Arashi	24 May 1990	29 May 1994	GPC
Minister of State for Parliamentary Affairs	Rashed Mohammed Thabet	24 May 1990	29 May 1994	GPC

== See also ==
- Politics of Yemen
