= Al-Eryani =

Al-Eryani (Arabic: الإرياني), or Al-Iryani is an Arabic language surname of Yemeni origins, and it may refer to:

- Abdulkarim El-Eryani (1934–2015; also spelled as Abdul-Karim Al-Iryani), Yemeni politician, served as the Prime Minister of Yemen
- Abdul Rahman al-Eryani (1910–1998), Yemeni politician
- Abdulmalek al-Eryani (born 1957), Yemeni politician
- Alaa Al-Eryani (born 1990), Yemeni filmmaker, photographer, writer, and feminist activist
- Hind Al-Eryani, Yemeni feminist activist and journalist
- Maysoon al-Eryani (born 1987), Yemeni poet and translator
- Mutaher al-Eryani (1933–2016), Yemeni poet, archeologist, historian and linguist
- Ramzia Abass al-Eryani (1954–2013), Yemeni novelist, diplomat, and feminist

== See also ==
- Ibb Governorate
