= 2011 in Yemen =

- Decades: 1990s; 2000s; 2010s; 2020s
- See also: Other events of 2011: History of Yemen; Timeline; Years

The following lists events that happened during 2011 in Yemen.

== Incumbents ==
- President: Ali Abdullah Saleh
- Vice President: Abdrabbuh Mansur Hadi
- Prime Minister: Ali Muhammad Mujawar (until 10 December) Mohammed Basindawa (starting 10 December)

== Events ==
=== January ===
- January 3 - Two boats capsize off the southern coast of Yemen with a total of 80 people missing. Only three have been found alive.
- January 11 - Hillary Clinton visited and stated that the Protestant of Al-Qaida are an urgent problem.
- January 14 - At least 10 people arrested in clashes between police and protesters.
- January 24 - Yemen frees a female activist accused of inciting disorder after protests demanding her release.
- January 27 - Tens of thousands of people protest in Sanaa calling for an end to the government of President Ali Abdullah Saleh.
- January 29 - Clashes take place outside the Egyptian embassy between supporters of President Ali Abdullah Saleh's government and opposition supporters expressing sympathy with the situation in Egypt.

=== February ===
- February 2 - President Ali Abdullah Saleh backtracks on his plan to rule Yemen for life and to then allow his son to inherit his rule during an emergency session of parliament ahead of tomorrow's "day of rage" against his three-decade rule.
- February 3 - Opposition groups held nationwide "Day of Rage" demonstrations against President Ali Abdullah Saleh, despite Saleh's announcement the previous day that he would not seek another term or allow his son to succeed him. Large demonstrations took place in Sana'a, Taiz and other cities, while pro-government rallies were also organized in the capital.
- February 11 - Demonstrators celebrating the ouster of Hosni Murabak in Egypt were attacked by hundred of men wielding knives, sticks, and assault rifles.
- February 18 - Anti-government protests intensified across Yemen during demonstrations organized as a "Friday of Fury". Clashes between protesters, pro-government supporters, and security forces left at least six people dead, including demonstrators in Taiz and Aden
- February 22 - Anti-government protests escalated in Sana'a after attacks by pro-government supporters reportedly killed at least one demonstrator and injured others during clashes with protesters demanding the resignation of President Ali Abdullah Saleh

=== March ===
- March 1 - The Joint Meeting Parties (JMP), Yemen's main opposition coalition, formally joined anti-government protests in Sana'a. Some youth protesters expressed concern that established political and tribal leaders might attempt to dominate the largely student- led protest movement.
- March 11 - One day after President Ali Abdullah Saleh proposed constitutional reforms and a parliamentary system, nearly 100,000 anti-government protesters gathered outside Sana'a University, demanding his immediate resignation. Protest leaders, including, activist Tawakkol Karman warned of growing tensions within the opposition movement.
- March 21 - Several senior Yemeni military commanders, including Major General Ali Mohsen al-Ahmar declared support for anti-government protesters seeking the resignation of President Ali Abdullah Saleh following deadly clashes in Sana'a. Saleh stated that the "great majority" of Yemenis supported stability and constitutional order.

=== May ===
- May 28 - President Ali Abdullah Saleh and Sadeq al-Ahmar agreed to end five days of fighting between government forces and tribal fighters in Sana'a. The clashes reportedly killed 124 people and heightened fears of civil war.

=== October ===
- October 10 - Yemeni human rights activist Tawakkol Karman won the Nobel Peace Prize, and became the first Arab woman, the youngest person at that time to have become a Nobel Peace Laureate and the category's second Muslim woman.

=== November ===
- November 23 - President Ali Abdullah Saleh signed a Gulf Cooperation Council brokered agreement in Riyadh to transfer power to Vice President Abdrabbuh Mansur Hadi within 30 days. The agreement also called for presidential elections within 90 days and stated that Saleh would have immunity from prosecution.

== Deaths ==
- September 30 - Anwar al-Awlaki, American-Yemeni lecturer and jihadist (b. 1971)
- October 14 - Abdulrahman al-Awlaki, teenage son of Anwar al-Awlaki (b. 1995)
