= 2014 in Yemen =

- Decades: 1990s; 2000s; 2010s; 2020s
- See also: Other events of 2014: History of Yemen; Timeline; Years

The following lists events that happened during 2014 in Yemen.

== Incumbents ==
- President: Abd Rabbuh Mansur Hadi
- Prime Minister:
  - Mohammed Basindawa (until 24 September)
  - Abdullah Mohsen al-Akwa (24 September–9 November)
  - Khaled Bahah (starting 9 November)

== Events ==
=== January ===
- January 8 - Two suspected al-Qaeda militants are killed in a U.S. drone strike in the southeastern province of Hadhramaut.
- January 18 - An Iranian diplomat is killed in Sana'a when he resisted gunmen who were trying to kidnap him near the ambassador's residence.
- January 31 - 15 soldiers are killed and four wounded by suspected al-Qaeda militants in an attack on an army checkpoint in southeastern Yemen.

=== February ===
- February 2 - Three explosions are reported in Sana'a along with heavy gunfire.
- February 10 - A presidential panel in Yemen agrees to transform the country into a federation of six regions.

=== March ===
- March 9 - At least 42 migrants from the Horn of Africa drown when their boat overturns off the coast of Shabwah Governorate.
- March 24 - Twenty soldiers are killed in an attack on a military checkpoint.

=== April ===
- April 4 - Suspected al-Qaeda militants attack an army post in Hadramawt province killing at least eight soldiers and injuring eleven.
- April 21 - 30 suspected al-Qaeda militants and 6 civilians are killed in a drone strike by the United States.
- April 30 - At least 30 people have been killed in clashes between al-Qaeda and the Yemen Army.

=== May ===
- May 9 - Yemeni security forces announce that they have killed Shayef Mohammed Saeed Al-Shabwani, an al-Qaeda terrorist wanted over a series of attacks in Sana'a.
- May 14 - Seven Yemeni Army soldiers and 16 Al-Qaeda in the Arabian Peninsula militants are killed in fighting near the town of Azan in Shabwa province.
- May 20 - At least 16 people are killed in clashes between Shi'ite Muslim tribesmen and Yemeni government forces and allied Sunni tribesmen.
- May 24 - At least 27 people are killed in an al-Qaeda raid on the town of Seyoun in Hadramout province.
- May 25 - The Yemeni Military kills 5 al-Qaeda militants and arrests 4 in a raid north of Sana'a.

=== June ===
- June 5 - An attack on a Yemeni military checkpoint by suspected al-Qaeda militants in Shabwah Governorate leaves 14 people dead.
- June 11 - The entire country of Yemen remains without electricity for a second day after insurgents sabotaged power lines linking the capital Sana'a and the contested Ma'rib Governorate.
- June 15 - 7 people are killed in Aden after a gunman opens fire on a minibus.

=== August ===
- August 7 - Yemeni forces kill at least seven al-Qaeda militants in the Wadi Hadramout region.

=== November ===
- November 1 - Clashes between al-Qaeda and security forces leave 20 soldiers and 3 militants dead in Hodeidah province.
- November 5 - A US drone strike kills five Al Qaeda in the Arabian Peninsula operatives including Shawki al-Badani and Nabil al-Dahab, leader of Ansar al-Sharia in Al Bayda Governorate.
- November 12 - Fighting between Houthi rebels and Ansar al-Sharia-backed Sunni tribes have left at least 33 dead in Al Bayda' Governorate.
- November 12 - A U.S. drone strike kills seven al-Qaeda militants in the south.
- November 25 - A joint operation by U.S. and Yemeni special operations forces on an al-Qaeda hideout in eastern Yemen rescues 8 hostages and leaves 7 militants dead.

=== December ===
- December 6 - An American civilian and a South African civilian die during an attempt to rescue them by U.S. Navy SEALs in Yemen. They were being held hostage by al-Qaeda in the Arabian Peninsula.
- December 6 - At least 70 drown when a migrant boat from Ethiopia sinks off the Red Sea coast of Yemen.
- December 9 - An Ansar al-Sharia suicide bomb attack kills seven soldiers at an army base in southern Yemen.
- December 16 - A pair of car bombs kill 20 children and 11 Houthi militants in Radaa.
- December 31 - At least 26 people are killed in a suicide bombing in Ibb.
