= 2012 in Yemen =

- Decades: 1990s; 2000s; 2010s; 2020s
- See also: Other events of 2012: History of Yemen; Timeline; Years

The following lists events that happened during 2012 in Yemen.

== Incumbents ==
- President: Ali Abdullah Saleh (until 6 February), Abd Rabbuh Mansur Hadi (starting 6 February)
- Vice President: Abd Rabbuh Mansur Hadi (until 27 February)
- Prime Minister: Mohammed Basindawa

== Events ==
=== January ===
- January 2 - Yemeni army defectors accuse outgoing President Ali Abdullah Saleh of seeking to sabotage a power-transfer deal brokered by the Gulf Cooperation Council.
- January 12 - At least 20 die in Sunni-Shia fighting in north Yemen.
- January 17 - Vice President Abdurabu Hadi says that presidential and parliamentary elections planned for next month will go ahead.
- January 20 - The Yemeni government modifies a new bill that would have granted legal immunity to aides of outgoing President Ali Abdullah Saleh.
- January 22 - Yemeni President Ali Abdullah Saleh announces that he is to leave for treatment in the United States.
- January 30 - A US drone airstrike kills 15 members of al-Qaeda in the Arabian Peninsula in Lawdar in the Abyan Governorate.
- January 31 - Six aid workers are kidnapped in Al Mahwit Governorate.

=== February ===
- February 2 - The six kidnapped aid workers in Al Mahwit Governorate are released.
- February 21 - Voters in Yemen go to the polls for a presidential election with current Vice-president Abd Rabbuh Mansur al-Hadi the only candidate on the ballot paper. There was only a 66% voter turn out rate.
- February 25 - An al-Qaeda suicide bombing claims at least 26 people in the city of Mukalla.
- February 25 - Abd-Rabbu Mansour Hadi is sworn in as the new President of Yemen.

=== March ===
- March 3 - At least three people are killed in a bombing that targeted a Republican Guard building in Badya.
- March 5 - The death toll in a battle between the Yemeni Army and al-Qaeda on the outskirts of Zinjibar yesterday rises to over 130.
- March 10 - Air raids in Bayda kill 10 al-Qaeda militants.
- March 12 - The bodies of 70 ethnic Somali and Oromo people are discovered near the Yemeni-Saudi Arabian border.
- March 18 - Two gunmen shoot dead an American working at a language school in Taez for spreading Christianity.
- March 31 - Around 30 people are killed in clashes between the army and suspected al-Qaeda militants in southern Yemen.

=== April ===
- April 6 - The new President of Yemen Abed Rabbo Mansour Hadi fires four governors and over a dozen military commanders including the half brother of former President Ali Abdullah Saleh who was head of the Yemeni Air Force.
- April 7 - The airport at Sana'a is closed after forces loyal to General Mohammed Saleh al-Ahmar, the former Chief of the Air Force and half-brother of former President Ali Abdullah Saleh, threaten to attack aircraft.
- April 9 - The Second Battle of Lawdar begins
- April 20 - At least 18 deaths are reported by Yemen's defence ministry as a result of an army offensive intent on recapturing the capital of Abyan Governorate.

=== May ===
- May 9 - Missile strikes kill eight militants near the al-Qaeda stronghold of Jaar.
- May 10 - An airstrike reportedly kills five al-Qaeda militants in Jaar.
- May 12 - The United States conducts two drone strikes in southeastern Yemen, killing 11 suspected al-Qaeda militants.

=== June ===
- June 15 - The 2012 Abyan offensive ends with the last Al-Qaeda soldiers retreating from Abyan.

September

- Yemen’s defense minister Maj. Gen. Mohammed Nasser Ahmed an assassination attempt and 12 people were killed in Sanaa.
- Protesters stormed U.S embassy in Sanaa over an anti-islam film that made in the U.S.
