= 2013 in Yemen =

- Decades: 1990s; 2000s; 2010s; 2020s
- See also: Other events of 2013: History of Yemen; Timeline; Years

The following lists events that happened during 2013 in Yemen.

== Incumbents ==
- President: Abd Rabbuh Mansur Hadi
- Prime Minister: Mohammed Basindawa

== Events ==
=== February ===
- February 19 - A Yemeni Air Force plane crashes in Sana'a, killing 12 people and injuring 11 others.
- February 23 - Three people are killed and 14 injured in clashes between civilians and government security forces in Aden and Mukalla, as thousands turn up for a day of planned protests. In a separate attack, a senior Yemeni security chief and two of his bodyguards are injured in a shooting.

=== March ===
- March 21 - Three members of Ansar al-Sharia and two pro-government militia fighters are killed in an attack in Abyan Governorate.
- March 22 - Two al-Qaeda fighters and two pro-government militiamen are killed in clashes in Jaar.

=== April ===
- April 8 - 4 army deserters and 3 tribesmen are killed in clashes in Al Bayda Governorate.
- April 27 - Five Yemeni soldiers and two al-Qaeda militants are killed in fighting in the central town of Rada. A senior intelligence officer is also gunned down by a drive-by shooting in the south.

== Deaths ==
- Mohammed Ali al-Ahwal, Yemeni banker and diplomat
