= 2007 in Yemen =

- Decades: 1980s; 1990s; 2000s; 2010s; 2020s
- See also: Other events of 2007: History of Yemen; Timeline; Years

The following lists events that happened during 2007 in Yemen.

== Incumbents ==
- President: Ali Abdullah Saleh
- Vice President: Abd Rabbuh Mansur Hadi
- Prime Minister: Abdul Qadir Bajamal (until 7 April), Ali Muhammad Mujawar (starting 7 April)

== Events ==
=== January ===
- January 28 - Six soldiers have been killed and 20 injured in attacks by Shia militants in the north of Yemen, officials say.

=== September ===
- September 30 - A dormant volcano erupts on Jabal al-Tair Island, a Yemeni island in the Red Sea.
