= Muhammad Ahmad (disambiguation) =

Mohamed or Muhammad Ahmed, or any variant thereof, may also refer to:

- Muhammad Ahmad (1844–1885), otherwise known as the Mahdi, was a religious figure in Sudan.
- Mohammed Taha al-Ahmed (born 1982), Syrian politician
- Mohamed Ahmed (Comorian politician) (1917–1984), Comorian politician
- Muhammad Ahmad (Nigerian politician) (died 2021), Nigerian politician
- Mohamed Jameel Ahmed (born 1969), Maldivian lawyer and politician
- Mohamed Taieb Ahmed (born 1975), Spanish-Moroccan drug lord
- Muhammad Akhlaq Ahmed (1971–2016), Pakistani field hockey player
- Mohammed Ahmed (cricketer) (born 1989), Indian cricketer
- Muhammad Ahmed (footballer, born 1988), Pakistani footballer who has played for the Pakistan national team
- Mohamed Ahmed (Emirati footballer) (born 1989), Emirati footballer
- Mohamed Ahmed (footballer, born 1998), Egyptian footballer
- Beso (footballer) (born 1999), Egyptian footballer, real name Mohamed Ahmed
- Mohammed Ahmad (footballer, born 1992), Emirati footballer
- Muhammad Ahmed (footballer, born 1991), Pakistani footballer playing currently for KRL FC
- Mohammed Ahmed (runner) (born 1991), Canadian long-distance runner
- Mohamed Ering (Mohamed Ahmed Saeed Ahmed El Fadul, born 1997), Sudanese footballer
- Mohamed Mustafa (Mohamed Mustafa Mohamed Ahmed, born 1996), Sudanese footballer
- Mohammed Polo (born 1956), Ghanaian footballer
- Mohammed Nasser Ahmed (born 1950), Yemeni major general and defense minister
- Muhammad Ahmed (swimmer) (born 1976), retired Iraqi swimmer
- Muhammad Isa Ahmad (born 1998), Bruneian swimmer
- Mohamed Ben Ahmed, Tunisian educator
- Mohammed Ahmed (businessperson) (born 1932), Ethiopian businessman
- Mohammad Hussain Ahmad (born 1946), Indian biotechnologist

== See also ==
- Ahmed Mohammed (disambiguation)
- Mahmoud Ahmed (disambiguation)
