= Ahmed Mohammed =

Ahmed Mohammed (with some minor variations of spelling transliteration) is an Arabic patronymic name. It means Ahmed, Son of Mohammed (more precisely expressed as Ahmed bin Mohammed) or Ahmed, descendant of Mohammed.

== Given name ==
Given the popularity of Ahmed and Mohammed as given name, there are many "Ahmed, son of Mohammed":

- Ahmed Mohammed al-Maqqari (c. 1578–1632), Arab-Algerian historian
- Ahmed bin Mohammed al-Khalili (born 1942), Grand Mufti of the Sultanate of Oman
- Ahmed Mohamed (general) (born 1964), Vice Chief of Defence Force of the Maldives National Defence Force
- Ahmed Mohammed Hamed Ali (1965–2010), Egyptian citizen suspected of terrorism
- Ahmed Mohamed (born c. 2001), American student arrested after bringing a reassembled clock to school in Texas (Ahmed Mohamed clock incident)

=== Politics ===
- Ahmed Mohammed Ali Al-Madani (born 1934), Saudi politician
- Ahmed Mohamed ag Hamani (born 1942), Prime Minister of Mali
- Ahmed Mohammed Inuwa (born 1948), Nigerian senator
- Ahmed Mohammed Makarfi (born 1956), Nigerian politician
- Ahmed Mohammed (Yemeni politician) (born 1960)
- Ahmed Mohammed Haroun (born 1964), Sudanese politician wanted internationally for war crimes in civil war

=== Sports ===
- Ahmad Salam Muhammad (born 1924), Pakistani Olympic sports shooter
- Ahmed Mohamed (fencer) (born 1964), Egyptian Olympic fencer
- Ahmed Mohamed Ismail (born 1964), Somali Olympic marathon runner
- Ahmed Mohamed (field hockey) (born 1981), Egyptian Olympic hockey player
- Ahmed Mohamed (weightlifter) (born 1988), Egyptian Olympic weightlifter
- Ahmed Abid Ali (born Ahmed Mohammed in 1986) Iraqi footballer
- Ahmed Fathi Mohamed (born 1990), Egyptian footballer
- Ahmed Mohamed (volleyball) (born 1989), Egyptian volleyball player
- Ahmed Mohamed (sport shooter) (born 1996), Egyptian sport shooter
- Ahmed Mohamed (basketball) (born 1995), on the Egypt national basketball team

== Middle name ==
When Ahmed Mohammed (or bin Ahmed bin Mohammed) occur after the person's proper name and usually before the family name (clan name), is means the person is son of Ahmed, son of Mohammed, may refer to:

- Jamal Ahmad Mohammad Al Badawi (born 1969), Yemeni citizen and suspected with terrorism
- Hayat Ahmed Mohammed (born 1982), 2003 Miss World contender from Ethiopia

== See also ==
- Muhammad Ahmad (disambiguation)
