= 2006 in Yemen =

- Decades: 1980s; 1990s; 2000s; 2010s; 2020s
- See also: Other events of 2006: History of Yemen; Timeline; Years

The following lists events that happened during 2006 in Yemen.

== Incumbents ==
- President: Ali Abdullah Saleh
- Vice President: Abd Rabbuh Mansur Hadi
- Prime Minister: Abdul Qadir Bajamal

== Events ==
=== February ===
- February 9 - U.S. forces are searching for the USS Cole attacker who escaped from prison last Friday. According to Interpol, an al-Qaeda operative who had been sentenced to death for plotting the bombing of the USS Cole in 2000 escaped with a group of convicts from their prison last week in Sana'a.

=== September ===
- September 23 - Ali Abdullah Saleh, in office since 1978, is re-elected as President of Yemen with 77.2% of the votes, prompting allegations of electoral fraud from the Yemeni opposition coalition.
