= 1999 Nigerian Senate elections in Kwara State =

The 1999 Nigerian Senate election in Kwara State was held on February 20, 1999, to elect members of the Nigerian Senate to represent Kwara State. Suleiman Ajadi representing Kwara South and Salman Is'haq representing Kwara Central won on the platform of All Nigeria Peoples Party, while Ahmed Zuruq representing Kwara North won on the platform of the Peoples Democratic Party.

== Overview ==
Affiliation	Party		Total
Affiliation	PDP	ANPP	Total
Before Election			3
After Election	1	2	3

== Summary ==
District	Incumbent	Party	Elected Senator	Party
Kwara South			Suleiman Ajadi	ANPP
Kwara Central			Salman Is'haq	ANPP
Kwara North			Ahmed Zuruq	PDP

== Results ==
=== Kwara South ===
The election was won by Suleiman Ajadi of the All Nigeria Peoples Party.

1999 Nigerian Senate election in Kwara State
Party	Candidate	Votes	%
ANPP	Suleiman Ajadi		
Total votes			
ANPP hold			

=== Kwara Central ===
The election was won by Salman Is'haq of the All Nigeria Peoples Party.

1999 Nigerian Senate election in Kwara State
Party	Candidate	Votes	%
ANPP	Salman Is'haq		
Total votes			
ANPP hold			

=== Kwara North ===
The election was won by Ahmed Zuruq of the Peoples Democratic Party.

1999 Nigerian Senate election in Kwara State
Party	Candidate	Votes	%
PDP	Ahmed Zuruq		
Total votes			
PDP hold			
