= 2010 in Yemen =

- Decades: 1990s; 2000s; 2010s; 2020s
- See also: Other events of 2010: History of Yemen; Timeline; Years

The following lists events that happened during 2010 in Yemen.

== Incumbents ==
- President: Ali Abdullah Saleh
- Vice President: Abd Rabbuh Mansur Hadi
- Prime Minister: Ali Muhammad Mujawar

== Events ==
=== January ===
- January 3 - The United States and United Kingdom close their embassies in Yemen, citing threats from al-Qaeda.
- January 5 - al-Qaeda insurgency in Yemen
  - The Yemeni government launches campaigns in three provinces to battle al-Qaeda fighters.
  - The United States reopens its embassy in Yemen after strikes on al-Qaeda.
- January 6 - Yemen arrests three suspected al-Qaeda members, including one leader, northwest of the capital Sana'a.
- January 21 - Yemen stops issuing visas at international airports to "halt terrorist infiltration" following the Christmas Day bomb plot.
- January 25 - Houthi fighters in northern Yemen offer to leave Saudi Arabia after three months of fighting on the border.
- January 30 - The leader of the Shia Houthi rebel group in northern Yemen, Abdul-Malik al-Houthi, says they will accept a ceasefire if government actions against them cease.

=== February ===
- February 3 - Pirates off the coast of Somalia seize a North Korean-flagged cargo ship south of Yemen.
- February 6 - 23 Yemeni government soldiers are killed by the Houthis in two separate incidents: 15 are ambushed in Wadi al-Jabara, while the remaining 8 die in Sa'dah.
- February 12 - A ceasefire is declared between Houthi fighters and the Yemeni government in northern Yemen.

=== March ===
- March 19 - President of Yemen Ali Abdullah Saleh declares an end to his country's six-year war against the Houthis.
- March 23 - United States issues new warnings of al-Qaeda threat to attack ships off coast of Yemen.
- March 31 - Yemeni Minister of Justice Ghazi al-Aghbari and Palestinian ambassador to Yemen Bassem Al-Agha hold discussions on the issue of bilateral judicial cooperation.

=== April ===
- April 6 - President of Yemen Ali Abdullah Saleh frees prisoners as part of its support for the cease-fire.
- April 26 - The British ambassador to Yemen, Timothy Torlot, survives an attempted suicide bombing.
