= 2003 Nigerian Senate elections in Kwara State =

2003 Nigerian Senate election in Kwara State

The 2003 Nigerian Senate election in Kwara State was held on April 12, 2003, to elect members of the Nigerian Senate to represent Kwara State. Ahmed Mohammed Inuwa representing Kwara North and Gbemisola Ruqayyah Saraki representing Kwara Central won on the platform of Peoples Democratic Party, while Suleiman Ajadi representing Kwara South won on the platform of the All Nigeria Peoples Party.

== Overview ==
| Affiliation | Party | | Total |
| Affiliation | PDP | ANPP | Total |
|---|---|---|---|
| Before Election | | | 3 |
| After Election | 2 | 1 | 3 |

== Summary ==
| District | Incumbent | Party | Elected Senator | Party |
|---|---|---|---|---|
| Kwara North | | | Ahmed Mohammed Inuwa | PDP |
| Kwara Central | | | Gbemisola Ruqayyah Saraki | PDP |
| Kwara South | | | Suleiman Ajadi | ANPP |

== Results ==
=== Kwara North ===
The election was won by Ahmed Mohammed Inuwa of the Peoples Democratic Party.

2003 Nigerian Senate election in Kwara State
| Party | Candidate | Votes | % |
|---|---|---|---|
| PDP | Ahmed Mohammed Inuwa | | |
| Total votes | | | |
| PDP hold | | | |

=== Kwara Central ===
The election was won by Gbemisola Ruqayyah Saraki of the Peoples Democratic Party.

2003 Nigerian Senate election in Kwara State
| Party | Candidate | Votes | % |
|---|---|---|---|
| PDP | Gbemisola Ruqayyah Saraki | | |
| Total votes | | | |
| PDP hold | | | |

=== Kwara South ===
The election was won by Suleiman Ajadi of the All Nigeria Peoples Party.

2003 Nigerian Senate election in Kwara State
| Party | Candidate | Votes | % |
|---|---|---|---|
| ANPP | Suleiman Ajadi | | |
| Total votes | | | |
| ANPP hold | | | |
