= Mohammed Nasser Ahmed =

Yemeni major general (born 1950)

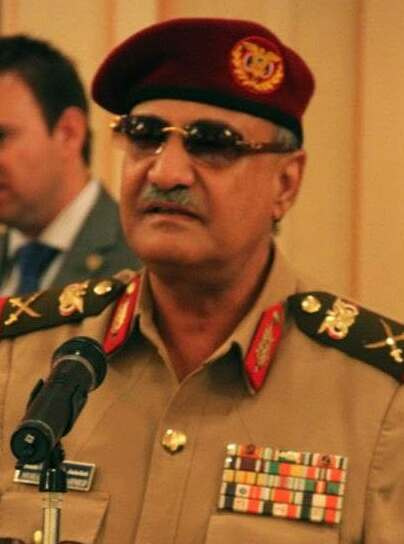
- Ahmed in 2012

Minister of Defence of Yemen
- In office 14 February 2006 – 9 November 2014
- President: Ali Abdullah Saleh; Abdrabbuh Mansur Hadi
- Prime Minister: Ali Muhammad Mujawar; Mohammed Basindawa; Abdullah Mohsen al-Akwa (Acting)
- Preceded by: Abdullah Ali Alewa
- Succeeded by: Mahmoud al-Subaihi

Personal details
- Born: 1 January 1950 (age 76) Na`ab, Mudiyah District, Abyan Governorate, Aden Protectorate
- Party: General People's Congress

Military service
- Allegiance: Yemen
- Rank: Major General

Mohammed Nasser Ahmed (Arabic: محمد ناصر أحمد; born 1950) is a Yemeni major general, who was the defense minister of Yemen between 2006 and 2014.

== Education ==
Ahmed was born on 1 January 1950 in Na`ab, Mudiyah District, Abyan Governorate. He holds a master's degree in military science.

== Career ==
Ahmed served in various capacities in Yemeni army and ministry of defense until 1994. That year he became director of logistics and supply. He later joined the Congress Party. He was appointed defense minister by President Ali Abdullah Saleh in February 2006. He succeeded Abdullah Ali Alewa in the post.

Later, Ahmed began to cooperate with future President Abed Rabbo Mansour Hadi. Ahmed retained his post in the government formed on 7 December 2012 after Saleh was removed from office. The national reconciliation government was headed by prime minister Muhammad Salim Basindwah.

=== Assassination attempts ===
Ahmed survived an assassination attempt on 27 September 2011 in Aden. He escaped another assassination attempt unhurt in Sanaa on 11 September 2012. However, the attack killed at least 13 people. He escaped an ambush by al-Qaeda gunmen southeast of Sanaa on 9 May 2014.
