= Hoda Ablan =

Yemeni poet

- Born: 1971 (age 54–55); Ibb, Ibb Governorate, Yemen
- Education: University of Sanaa
- Writing career
- Period: 1989-present
- Genre: Poetry

Hoda Ablan (born 1971) is a Yemeni poet.

== Life and career ==
She was born in Ibb and studied at the University of Sanaa, obtaining a bachelor's degree in political science and economics in 1993.

Ablan has served as the secretary-general of the Yemeni Writers Union. She is married with children.

== Works ==
Her first collection of poetry Wurud shaqiyat al-malamih (Roses with Mischievous Features) was published in Damascus in 1989. She has since published several other poetry collections. Her work has appeared in translation in several outlets including two issues of Banipal magazine (issues 8 and 36).

=== In anthologies ===
- Handal, Nathalie, ed. (2001). The Poetry of Arab Women: A Contemporary Anthology. Interlink Books.
- Badran, Margot; Cooke, Miriam, eds. (2004). Opening the Gates: An Anthology of Arab Feminist Writing (2nd ed.). Bloomington: Indiana University Press. ISBN 978-0-253-34441-0.
