= Minister of Finance of South Yemen =

- Emblem (1970–90)
- Incumbent; None
- Ministry of Finance
- Status: Minister
- Member of: Government
- Reports to: The prime minister
- Seat: Aden
- Appointer: The president
- Formation: 1967; 59 years ago
- First holder: Mahmud Abdallah Uraish
- Final holder: Ahmad Nasir al-Danami
- Abolished: 1990; 36 years ago

The minister of finance was a government minister in charge of the Ministry of Finance of South Yemen (common name for the People's Democratic Republic of Yemen), in what is now southern Yemen. The minister was responsible for public finances of the country.

== Ministers ==
- Mahmud Abdallah Uraish, 1967
- Seif Ahmed ad-Dhali, 1968-1969
- Mahmud Abdallah Uraish, 1969-1974
- Fadhl Mohsen, 1974-1978-? (Abdullah Fadl Muhsin)
- Ali Nasir Muhammad al-Hasani, ?-1979
- Mahmud Said al-Madhi, 1979-1986
- Mahmud Said Midhi, 1986-1987
- Ahmad Nasir al-Danami, 1987-1990

For ministers of finance of unified Yemen after 1990, see Ministry of Finance (Yemen).

== See also ==
- Minister of Finance of North Yemen
- Ministry of Finance (Yemen)
