= Khaled Sheikh =

Yemeni diplomat

Dr. Khaled Rajeh Sheikh (Arabic: خالد راجح شيخ) was a Yemeni diplomat and politician. He was born in Yafa'a. He attended high school in Zinjibar. He has a doctorate and a master's degree in economic management from Charles University in the Czech Republic. He served as ambassador to Kuwait from 2007 until quitting over the 2011 Yemeni uprising. He later resumed his position and served in it until 3 July 2012. Prior to this role, he served as the minister of industry and trade in the Bajamal Cabinet 2003 to 2006. He died on 14 February 2024 in a hospital in Kuwait after his health deteriorated.
