= Maysoon al-Eryani =

Maysoon al-Eryani (born 24 November 1987) is a poet and translator from Yemen, who writes in Arabic and English. She was born in Sana'a and has a BA in English Literature from Sana'a University.

== Publications ==
- The Mysterious side of paradise (2013).
- Madad (2010)
- Gold Pendants (2010)
- I'll Break the Sky by Lovers (2009)
- As Long as my Heart (2008)

== Associations ==
- Member of the Union of the Yemeni Writers and Authors.
- Member of the Yemeni Women's Association.

== Awards ==
- Al Makaleh prize for Arabic literature" poetry” 2013
- President's prize for young poets 2010/2009
- First prize, poetry competition 2007. Sana'a University
- First prize, poetry competition 2006, University of Science and Technology.
- Honored in 2010 by Poets Without Borders.
