= Al-Ghurfa (city-state) =

- 1918–1945
- Al-Ghurfa (city-state) (Yemen)
- Capital: al-Ghurfa (city-state)
- Religion: Islam
- Government: Disputed: Sultanate, Sheikhdom, or Principality
- Ruler
  - 1918-1939: ‘Umar b. ‘Ubayd Bin ‘Abdat (first)
  - 1939-1945: ‘Ubayd b. Salih Bin ‘Abdat (last)
- History
  - Established: 1918
  - Disestablished: 1945
Preceded by	Succeeded by
Kathiri Sultanate	Kathiri Sultanate
- Today part of: Yemen

al-Ghurfa was a city-state ruled by the Bin 'Abdat dynasty that existed in South Arabia from 1918 to 1945.

== Timeline ==
- 7 June 1918: the Kathiri Sultanate signs the Aden Agreement with the Qu'aiti State, leading to the Kathiri being incorporated into the Aden Protectorate.
- 1918: the local Bin 'Abdat dynasty rejects the Aden agreement. As a result, the village of al-Ghurfa secedes from the Kathiri Sultanate.
- March 1925: Sayyid Husayn b. Hamid al-Mihdhar, the Qu'aiti sultan, signs an agreement with the Kathiri sultan that the Bin 'Abdat dynasty's control over al-Ghurfa should be liquidated.
- July 1926: A combined Qu'aiti-Kathiri force surrounds al-Ghurfa, but is unable to conquer the city after a month-long siege. The attacking force lacked solidarity and morale, while the defenders resourcefully used sniper fire to undermine the besiegers.
- September 1926: the "Bin 'Abdat brothers" (the sheikh of al-Ghurfa and his brother) are invited to Aden for negotiations, which take place by late January 1927 at the latest. The sheikhs submit a 50-page memorandum wherein they document their claim to sovereignty over al-Ghurfa.
- 1928: Al-Ghurfa agrees to a ceasefire with the Kathiri and Qu'aiti sultanates.
- 1943 to 1945: A famine occurs in the Aden protectorate, and al-Ghurfa interferes with relief supplies, ultimately prompting a British military intervention.
  - March 1945: British troops from Hyderabad conquer al-Ghurfa, and the village is re-incorporated into the Kathiri Sultanate.

== Rulers ==
British documents refer to Ubayd b. Salih Bin ‘Abdat, the final ruler of al-Ghurfa, by the title of sheikh. In contrast, Linda Boxberger refers to this polity as a sultanate and principality.

- ‘Umar b. ‘Ubayd Bin ‘Abdat (1918-1939)
- ‘Ubayd b. Salih Bin ‘Abdat (1939-1945; nephew of ‘Umar b. ‘Ubayd)

== Military ==
The Bin 'Abdat dynasty used its wealth to recruit 200 African slave soldiers for the defense of al-Ghurfa.

== International relations ==
Despite its de facto independence, British officials regarded al-Ghurfa as a subject of the Kathiri Sultan. Furthermore, the Kathiri and Qu'aiti sultans themselves refused to recognise the Bin 'Abdat dynasty's claims, as it was believed that doing so would encourage further balkanisation of the region.
