= Minister of Finance of North Yemen =

- Emblem (1974–90)
- Incumbent; None
- Ministry of Finance
- Status: Minister
- Member of: Government
- Reports to: The Prime Minister
- Seat: Sanaa
- Final holder: Alawi Saleh al-Salami
- Abolished: 1990

The Minister of Finance was a government minister in charge of the Ministry of Finance of North Yemen (common name for the Yemen Arab Republic), in what is now northern Yemen. The Minister was responsible for public finances of the country. The ministry of finance was established in 1974 and it was preceded by the ministry of treasury.

== Ministers of treasury ==
- Sheikh Mohammed Ali Othman, ?-1961-?
- Abdullatif Deifallah, ?-?
- Abdul Ghani Ali, ?-1964-?
- Ahmad al-Ruhumi, ?-1966
- Abdul Ghani Ali, 1966-1967
- Ahmad Abdu Said, 1967-1969
- Ali Lutfi al-Thor, 1969-1970
- Ahmad Abdu Said, 1971-1972
- Muhammad Ahmad al-Junayd 1973-1974

== Ministers of finance ==
- Muhammad Ahmad al-Junayd, 1974-1978
- Ahmed Abdul Rahman Al-Samawi, 1978-1980
- Muhammad Yahya al-Adhi, 1980-1983
- Muhammad al-Khadam al-Wajih, 1983-1986
- Alawi Saleh al-Salami, 1986-1990

For ministers of finance of unified Yemen after 1990, see Ministry of Finance (Yemen).

== See also ==
- Minister of Finance of South Yemen
- Ministry of Finance (Yemen)
