= Tariq Najm =

Tariq Najem
- طارق نجم
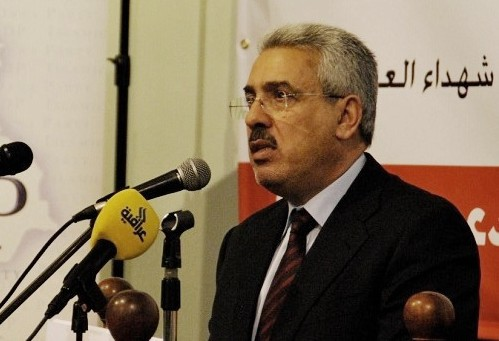
- Speaking at conference

Chief of Staff to the Prime Minister of Iraq
- In office 20 May 2006 – 20 December 2010
- Prime Minister: Nouri al-Maliki

Personal details
- Born: July 1946 (age 80) Ash Shatrah, Muntafiq Governorate, Kingdom of Iraq
- Party: Islamic Dawa Party
- Other political affiliations: State of Law Coalition
- Children: 4
- Education: Usul al-Din University, Baghdad
- Occupation: Politician

Tariq Najm Abdullah Al Saa'dawi (Arabic: طارق نجم عبدالله السعداوي) known as Tariq Najm (born July 1945) was the Chief of Staff for the previous Prime Minister of Iraq Nouri al-Maliki; between 2006 and 2010. He is a senior advisor for the current Iraqi Prime Minister Haider al-Abadi.

Najm was born in July 1945 in the city of Ash Shatrah in what was then known as Muntafiq Governorate. He went on to study as an undergraduate at the Faculty Theology at the University of Baghdad. He has been a member of the Islamic Dawa Party since the late sixties. He then went on to earn a master's degree and doctorate from the University of Al-Azhar in the Arabic language, before going on to work as a professor at King Abdul Aziz University in Jeddah. In 1986 he moved to the United Arab Emirates, teaching at the United Arab Emirates University until 1991, when he moved to Yemen and was appointed as a professor at Sana'a University. He worked there until 2001, when he travelled to London and claimed political asylum.

Following the Invasion of Iraq in April 2003 he returned to Iraq, and became Nouri al-Maliki's Chief of Staff in Maliki's First Government in the summer of 2006.

After the poor performance of the Iraqi Army and the resurgence of anti-government militant groups during the 2014 Northern Iraq offensive there were discussions of Prime Minister Nouri al-Maliki being replaced. Najm was one of the individuals rumoured to be being considered as a replacement. In Najm's favour was his reputation as a mediator, his healthy relationships with Iran, Turkey, and the US, and also his strong relationship with Ayatollah Sistani. He is no longer a member of the Iraqi government.
