= Mahmoud Ahmed (disambiguation) =

Mahmoud Ahmed may refer to:

- Mahmoud Ahmed, Ethiopian singer
- Mahmoud Ahmed (water polo), Egyptian water polo player
- Mahmud Ahmed, Pakistani Army general
- Mahmud Ahmad, Malaysian professor
- Chaudhry Mehmood Ahmad Sungran, Pakistani politician

== See also ==
- Muhammad Ahmad (disambiguation)
