= Faisal Amin Abu-Rass =

Yemeni diplomat and politician (born 1957)

Ambassador of Yemen to Lebanon and Cyprus
- In office 13 January 2009 – 21 March 2011
- Preceded by: Mohamed Qubaty
- Succeeded by: vacant

Personal details
- Born: 31 December 1957 (age 68) al-Houri, Dhi As Sufal District, Ibb Governorate, North Yemen
- Relatives: Sadeq Amin Abu Rass (brother)
- Occupation: Diplomat, politician

Faisal Amin Abu-Rass (Arabic: فيصل امين ابو راس; born 31 December 1957) is a Yemeni diplomat and politician. He quit his position as ambassador to Lebanon and Cyprus over the 2011 Yemeni uprising. He was the first ambassador to resign over the uprising. He previously served as a member of parliament for the ruling party, the General People's Congress. He served as a representative in Al-Jawf Governorate but resigned in 2005 over alleged corruption.

Since the Houthi takeover in Yemen, he has served as the undersecretary for foreign affairs and has met with the UN special envoy for Yemen Martin Griffiths. His brother is Sadeq who is the current head of the General People's Congress.
