= Mohammed Hassan Damaj =

Yemeni politician (1938-2018)

- محمد حسن دماج

Minister of Local Administration

Personal details
- Born: 1938 Yemen
- Died: 2018 (aged 79–80)
- Profession: Politician

Mohammed Hassan Damaj (Arabic: محمد حسن دماج; 1938 – 2018) was a Yemeni politician. He was a member of the Islah Party and served as Minister of Local Administration.

== Career ==
He was born in 1938 in Ibb. He was former Minister of Local Administration in the Government of Yemen from 1994 to 1997. He served as governor of al-Bayda and from 2012 to 2014 governor of Amran Governorate and in 2014 he was appointed as a member of Shura Council. ِHe was detained by the Houthis after they stormed and seized the capital Sanaa in 2014. He was released six months later.
