= Mohamed Ben Ahmed =

Tunisian educator

Mohamed Ben Ahmed is a Tunisian educator. He is the founder, along with diplomat Habib Bourguiba, Jr., of the École nationale des sciences de l'informatique (ENSI), a school of information technology.

== Career ==
He was founder and Director of ENSI (Ecole Nationale des Sciences de l'Informatique] from 1984 to 1990. Then Professor to 2004. He was the director of the RIADI-GDL laboratory at ENSI from 1999 until 2005. He is emeritus professor since 2005.

Ben Ahmed was the first holder of the post of secretary of state for Informatics [Tunisia], a post that was created in 1995 by president Ben Ali. In July 1997, he was named Ambassador to St James Court and to Dublin

In 1998, Ben Ahmed was named secretary of state for scientific research and technology. On 17 April 2013, he presents an excellent conference on "Nouvelles Organisations, Management et Portails de Connaissance" at (Ecole Supérieure de Technologie et d'Informatique - université de Carthage).
