= Yahya Al-Mutawakel =

Yemeni Cabinet Minister

Minister of Industry and Trade
- In office April 2007 – January 2011

Personal details
- Born: 25 September 1959 (age 67) Sana'a, Yemen
- Education: Sana'a University (BA); University of Maryland, College Park (MA); University of East Anglia (PhD)

Yahya Yahya Al-Mutawakel (Arabic: يحيى بن يحيى المتوگل, born 25 September 1959) is a professor of economics at Sana'a University who served as Minister of Industry and Trade in the Cabinet of Yemen from 2007 to 2011.

Born in Sana'a, he was educated at Sana'a University (BA Economics & Political Science, 1982) and the University of Maryland, College Park (MA Economics, 1986), and completed his PhD in 1992 at the University of East Anglia entitled "Import substitution as an industrial strategy in the Yemen Arab Republic". His experience includes work for the World Bank and United Nations.
