= Alaa Al-Eryani =

Yemeni filmmaker, photographer, writer, and feminist activist

Alaa Al-Eryani (born 1990) is a filmmaker, photographer, writer, and feminist activist from Yemen.

== Life ==
Born in Egypt, Al-Eryani was brought up in Sanaa. After gaining a degree in digital film and television from Limkokwing University, she returned to Yemen in 2012. In April 2013 Al-Eryani founded the Yemeni Feminist Movement, a project on Facebook and Twitter, and has subsequently faced threats for her promotion of women's rights.

In 2013 Al-Eryani was one of the first to write on the case of Nada al-Ahdal, the ten-year-old girl who uploaded a short YouTube video complaining that she was being forced into a marriage contract. She emphasised the difference in attitudes between rural and urban areas:

If you go to a small village, they would tell you that she's crazy for running away from her parents, if you go to these villages, eight-year-olds are being married… Here in the city, where people are generally more educated and aware, they would tell you that it shouldn't happen.

== Filmography ==
Al-Eryani has directed two short films, Insight (2011) and Broken (2016).
