= Abdullah Mohsen al-Akwa =

Yemeni politician (born 1961)

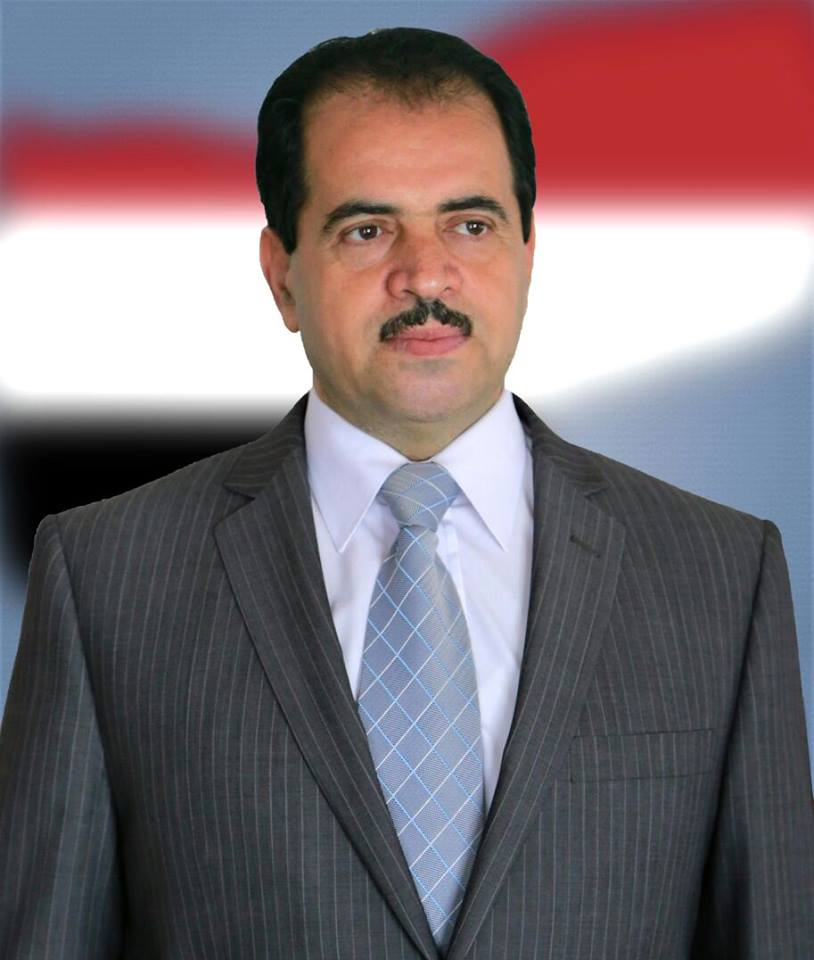

Prime Minister of Yemen
- Acting; 24 September 2014 – 9 November 2014
- President: Abdrabbuh Mansur Hadi
- Deputy: Ahmed Obeid bin Daghr
- Preceded by: Mohammed Basindawa
- Succeeded by: Khaled Bahah

Minister of Electricity
- In office 11 June 2014 – 27 November 2018
- President: Abdrabbuh Mansur Hadi
- Prime Minister: Mohammed Basindawa; Himself (Acting); Khaled Bahah; Ahmed Obeid bin Daghr
- Preceded by: Saleh Sumai
- Succeeded by: Mohammed Abdullah Saleh Naser al-Anani

Deputy Prime Minister of Yemen
- In office 11 June 2014 – 9 November 2014
- President: Abdrabbuh Mansur Hadi
- Prime Minister: Mohammed Basindawa

Minister of Electricity and Water
- In office 6 October 1994 – 14 May 1997
- President: Ali Abdullah Saleh
- Prime Minister: Abdul Aziz Abdul Ghani

Personal details
- Born: 18 April 1961 (age 65) Sana'a, North Yemen
- Party: Al-Islah
- Children: 4

Abdullah Mohsen al-Akwa (Arabic: عبد الله محسن الأكوع; born 18 April 1961) is a Yemeni politician who was acting Prime Minister of Yemen from 24 September 2014 to 9 November 2014.

Born in 1961 in Sana'a, he graduated from high school and later studied in France in 1978 to get Bachelor Degree in Computer Science. In 1994, he is one of the founding members of the Islah political party and served in Ministry of Electricity and Water the same year. Between 2001 and 2010, he was the Vice-Chairman of the Supreme Committee for Elections and Referendum.

He is married and has 3 daughters.

Political offices
Preceded by Mohammed Basindawa	Prime Minister of Yemen; Acting; 2014	Succeeded by Khaled Bahah
