= Mohammed Lutf al-Iryani =

Yemeni scientist, diplomat, and politician

Dr. Mohammed Lutf Al-Eryani is a Yemeni scientist, diplomat and politician. He quit his position as ambassador to Germany over the Yemeni revolution in 2011. Considered an expert in water management, he has also served as Water and Environment Minister of Yemen.
