= Abdulmalek al-Eryani =

Yemeni politician

Abdulmalek Abd al-Rahman al-Eryani (Arabic: عبدالملك عبدالرحمن الإرياني;born 1957) is a Yemeni politician. He held the post of Minister of Tourism and Environment from 2001 to 2003 in the first government of Bajmal and then from 2003 to 2006 in Bajmal's second government.

== Education ==
He was born in 1957 in Ibb. He studied economics in US and earned a BA degree.
