= Ahmed Zuruq =

Nigerian Senator
- In office 29 May 1999 – 29 May 2003
- Succeeded by: Ahmed Mohammed Inuwa
- Constituency: Kwara North Senatorial District

Personal details
- Born: 20 October 1951 (age 75)
- Party: ANPP (1998–2002), PDP (2002–present)
- Profession: Business

Ahmed Baba Zuruq (20 October 1951), Danmasanin Patigi, is a Nigeria senator from the Kwara North delegation elected in 1999 to 2003. He is a member of the Revenue Mobilization, Allocation and Fiscal Commission nominated by the Senate.

== Education ==
He holds a post graduate diploma in Business administrative management from the British Institute of Administrative Management.

== 2002 parties ==
Zuruq led five lawmakers in the House of Representatives delegation from Kwara State, including Hon. Isa Bio, Rauf Shittu, Ruqayyah Gbemisola Saraki, Bashir Oni and Farouk Sarouk, to decamp from the All Nigeria Peoples Party to the ruling party PDP in an compliance with the directive of Dr. Olusola Saraki, the father of Gbemisola Saraki and Bukola Saraki.
