= Alawi Hussein Attas =

Yemeni politician

Alawi Hussein Attas (Arabic: علوي حسين العطاس; born 1949) is a Yemeni politician. He previously served as Minister of State for Parliament and Shura affairs from 2001 to 2003.
