= Hasan al-Lawzi =

Yemeni politician and writer (1952–2020)

Hasan al-Lawzi حسن أحمد اللوزي

Acting Prime Minister of Yemen
- In office 4 June 2011 – 23 August 2011
- President: Ali Abdullah Saleh
- Preceded by: Ali Muhammad Mujawar
- Succeeded by: Ali Muhammad Mujawar

Personal details
- Born: 1952 Sanaa, Yemen
- Died: July 13, 2020 (aged 68) Cairo, Egypt
- Education: Al-Azhar University

Hasan Ahmad al-Lawzi (1952 – 13 July 2020) was a Yemeni politician and writer. He was the Minister of Information.

== Biography ==
Al-Lawzi was born in Sana'a and was educated at Cairo's Al-Azhar University. He published several volumes of poetry and short stories that reflected his profound interest in the Yemeni revolution. His work has been translated into English and was included in anthologies of modern Arabian literature during the 1980s. He later became involved in government and held a number of important positions.

Al-Lawzi died on 13 July 2020, at the age of 68, after contracting COVID-19 during the COVID-19 pandemic in Egypt.

== See also ==
- Cabinet of Yemen
