= Abdullah Ali Alewa =

Yemeni politician and military officer (born 1947)

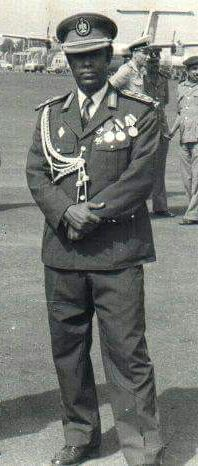

Minister of Defense
- In office 4 April 2001 – 7 April 2007
- President: Ali Abdullah Saleh
- Prime Minister: Abdul Qadir Bajamal
- Preceded by: Mohammed Dhaifullah Mohammed
- Succeeded by: Mohammed Nasser Ahmed

Personal details
- Born: 1947 (age 78–79) Shabwah Governorate, Yemen

Abdullah Ali Alewa (Arabic: عبدالله علي عليوه; born 1947) is a Yemeni politician and military officer. He served previously as chief of staff of Yemen Armed Forces and minister of defense. He quit his position as adviser of the Yemeni supreme leader of the army over the Yemeni revolution.

== Early life and education ==
He was born in 1947 in Haban, Shabwah governorate. He grew up and studied his basic and elementary education in Aden. He obtained a master's degree in Military Sciences from Air Academy in Kyiv in 1977.

== Career ==
- Com of the Air Force and Air Defense, South Yemen
- Chief of Staff of the Army, South Yemen
- Deputy Minister of Defense, South Yemen
- Com of Al-Jawf Axis, Governor of Al-Jawf Governorate, 1992
- Com of Shabwa Axis, 1994
- Chief of Staff of Yemen Armed Forces, 1994
- Minister of Defense, 2001
- Advisor to Supreme Com of the Yemeni Armed Forces, 2006
