= Naʽab =

Coordinates: 13°54′N 46°10′E

- Location in Yemen
- Country: Yemen
- Governorate: Abyan Governorate
- District: Mudiyah District
- Time zone: UTC+3 (Yemen Standard Time)

Naʽab (Arabic: ناعب) is a village in south-western Yemen. It is located in the Abyan Governorate, Mudiyah District. According to the 2004 census it`s population was 48 people.
