= 2013 Sanaa Sukhoi Su-22 crash =

Aviation incident in Sanaa, Yemen

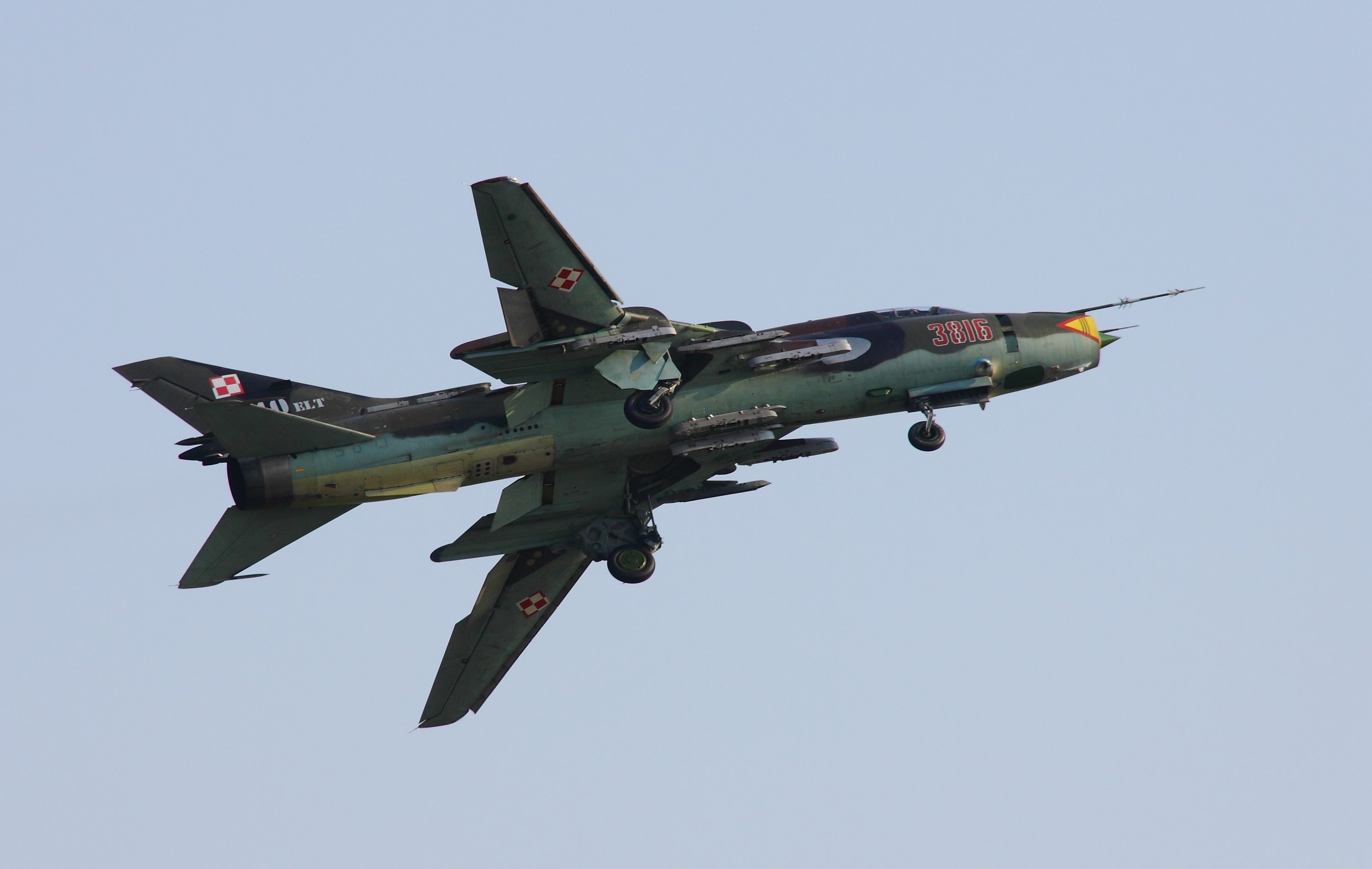
- A Sukhoi Su-22, similar to the aircraft which crashed

Occurrence
- Date: 19 February 2013
- Summary: Ejection
- Site: al-Asbahi, Sanaa, Yemen
- Total fatalities: 12
- Total injuries: 24

Aircraft
- Aircraft type: Sukhoi Su-22
- Operator: Yemeni Air Force
- Registration: 2216
- Passengers: 0
- Crew: 1
- Fatalities: 0
- Injuries: 1
- Survivors: 1

Ground casualties
- Ground fatalities: 12
- Ground injuries: 23

On February 19, 2013, a Sukhoi Su-22 of the Yemeni Air Force crashed into a building in the al-Asbahi district in Sanaa, located on Yemen. The pilot ejected, meanwhile 12 people died.

== Accident ==
The fighter jet took off from Sanaa. The aircraft then crashed into a building near Change Square, Sanaa, located on Yemen. The pilot ejected, but 12 people got killed and 24 more injured.

== See also ==
- 2002 Jalandhar MiG-21 crash
