= Ahmed Mohammed (Yemeni politician) =

Yemeni politician (born 1960)

Ahmed Mohamed (born 1960) is a Yemeni politician.

He studied at Sanaa University in 1985. In the Parliament of Yemen he has served as Secretary of Planning and Financial and Economic affairs, Secretary of the Cultural and Services, Secretary of the Standing Committee of the People's Constituent Assembly and Director General of the Department of Public Affairs Committees from 1990 to 1996.

He also participated in and supervised the preparation of the legal documentation for successive parliaments during the period 1988 to 1996.

He was the Chairman of the Committee of the Supreme Council for the first elections of deputies in the Republic of Yemen (1993).
