= Hussein al-Awadhi =

Yemeni politician and journalist

Hussein Dhaifallah al-Awadhi (Arabic: حسين ضيف الله العواضي; born 1957) is a Yemeni politician and journalist. He served as Minister of Information from 2001 to 2006.

== Education ==
He was born in 1957 in Al-Bayda Governorate. He obtained a BA degree in economics and political sciences from Sana'a University, diploma in international politics from Sana'a University and MA in journalism from University of Maryland.

== Career ==
- Member of the International Center of Journalists, Washington
- 1994–1999 Secretary General of the Yemeni Olympic Committee
- 1986–1996 Chairman, Yemeni Union of Sports Media Information officer, UN Society
- Deputy Chairman of Yemeni Journalists’ Syndicate
- Chief Editor of Saba News Agency
- Professor of Arab Media and Specialised Journalism, Sana'a University
- 2001–2006 Minister of Information
