= Al-Ghurfah =

- Location in Yemen
- Coordinates: 15°55′N 48°44′E
- Country: Yemen
- Governorate: Hadhramaut Governorate

Population (2004)
  - Total: 5,006
- Time zone: UTC+3 (Yemen Standard Time)

Al-Ghurfah is a small town in east-central Yemen, located just east of Shibam. It is located in the Hadhramaut Governorate. According to the 2004 census it had a population of 5,006 people. The 2009 estimate for the town is 5,700.

From 1918 to 1945, it was an independent sheikhdom.
