= Saleh Sumai =

Yemeni politician

Governor of Al-Mahwait Governorate
- Incumbent
- Assumed office 21 November 2016

Minister of Minister of Electricity and Energy
- In office 7 December 2011 – 11 January 2014

Minister of Ministry of Expatriates Affairs
- In office 6 April 2007 – May 2008

Personal details
- Born: 1956 (age 69–70) Al-Mahwait Governorate

Saleh Hasan Sumai (Arabic: صالح حسن سميع; born 1956) is a Yemeni politician currently serving as the governor of Al-Mahwait Governorate since 2016.

== Biography ==
He was born in 1956 in Hasn Saleh, a village in al-Mahwait Governorate. He received basic education in Sana'a and then entered Police Academy in Sana'a and graduated in 1975. He later joined the Faculty of Sharia and Law, Sanaa University, and graduated in 1980. In 1982 he obtained a master's degree in philosophy of law from Ain Shams University. He held many government positions, including governor of Marib Governorate in 1999, minister of Expatriates Affairs in 2007, minister of Electricity and Energy in 2011, and governor of Al-Mahwait Governorate in 2016.
