= Ahmed Mohammed Inuwa =

Nigerian politician and civil engineer

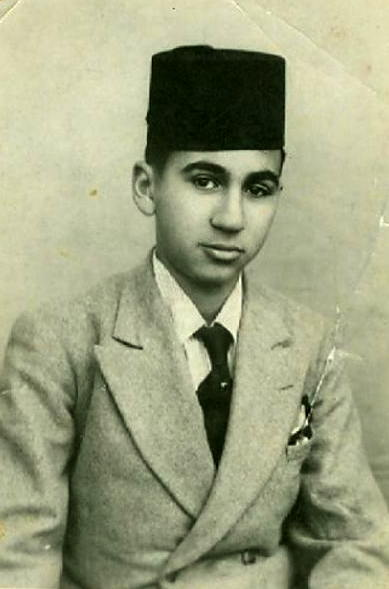

National Senator
- In office 2003 – May 2011
- Preceded by: Ahmed Zuruq
- Succeeded by: Shaaba Lafiaji
- Constituency: Kwara North

Personal details
- Born: 19 September 1948 (age 78)
- Party: All Progressive Congress (APC)
- Profession: Civil Engineer, Politician

Ahmed Mohammed Inuwa is a Nigerian politician and civil engineer who was elected to the Nigerian Senate in 2003 on the platform of People's Democratic Party (PDP) for the Kwara North constituency of Kwara State. He nurses an ambition to contest the gubernatorial position in Kwara state in 2011. He is currently a card carrying member of the All Progressive Congress.

== Background ==
Ahmed Mohammed Inuwa was born on 19 September 1948. He obtained a bachelor's degree in government from Ahmadu Bello University, Zaria, a diploma in development Administration from the University of Birmingham, United Kingdom and an Mni (Member National Institute) from the National Institute for Policy and Strategic Studies in Kuru, Nigeria, Jos.

== Senate career ==
Inuwa was elected to the National Senate for the Kwara North constituency in 2003 and reelected in 2007. He was appointed to committees on Education, Culture & Tourism, Appropriation, Agriculture and Health. By the middle of his second term, he initiated a bill seeking to "Establish Chartered Pension Institute of Nigeria".
