= Abdulkarim Al-Arhabi =

Yemeni politician

Deputy Prime Minister for Economic Affairs
- In office 2006–2012
- President: Ali Abdullah Saleh
- Succeeded by: Mohamed Al Saadi

Minister of Planning and International Cooperation
- In office 2006–2012
- President: Ali Abdullah Saleh

Minister of Social Affairs and Labor
- In office 2001–2006
- President: Ali Abdullah Saleh

Personal details
- Born: (Yemen)

Abdulkarim Ismail Al-Arhabi (Arabic: عبدالكريم اسماعيل الارحبي) was the Deputy Prime Minister for Economic Affairs and Minister of Planning and International Cooperation in the Republic of Yemen. He was also the managing director of the Social Fund for Development, which was established in 1997. Al-Arhabi held the post of Minister of Social Affairs and Labor from 2001 to 2006, when he was appointed Deputy Prime Minister for Economic Affairs and Minister of Planning and International Cooperation. On 30 April 2010, the World Bank awarded Al-Arhabi the Jit Gill Memorial Award for Outstanding Public Service for being "a key champion in the battle to reduce poverty, improve governance and broaden economic growth for Yemen."

Following the anti-government 2011 Yemeni protests, President Ali Abdullah Saleh fired all members of the Cabinet of Yemen on 20 March 2011. The cabinet members will remain in place until a new government is formed.

He died on 19 January 2021 in a hospital in Kuwait City at the age of 70.

== See also ==
- Cabinet of Yemen
