= Rashid Barba'a =

Yemeni politician (born 1952)

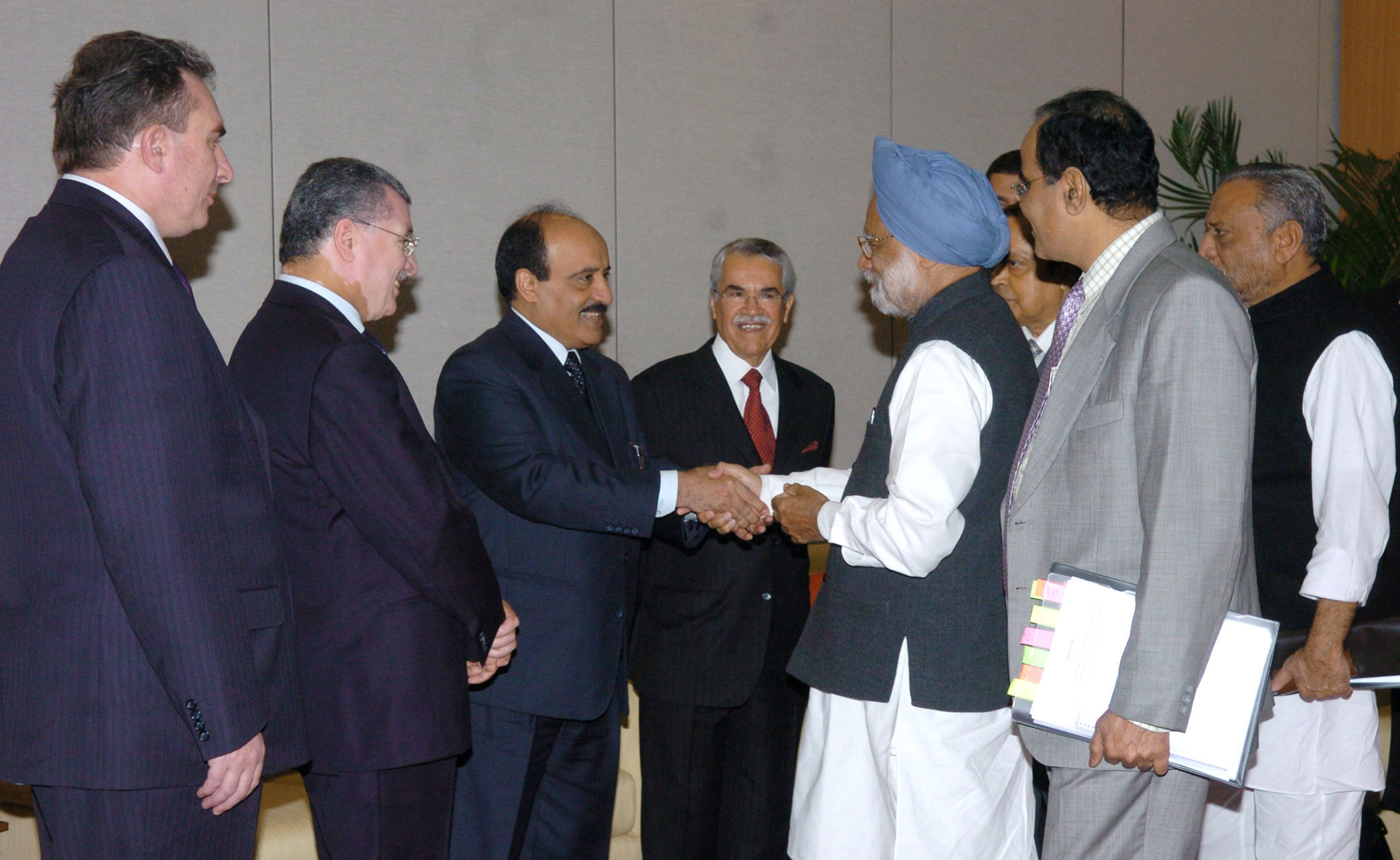
Barba'a (center) in 2007

Rashid Barba'a (Arabic: رشيد بارباع; born 1952) is a Yemeni politician who served as Minister of Oil and Mineral Resources from 2001 to 2006.

== Education ==
Rashid was born in 1952 in Hadhramout Governorate. He obtained a master's degree in oil and chemistry, USSR, and then a PhD in 1987 in Moscow.
