= Hamoud Muhammed Ou'bad =

Yemeni politician

Minister of Religious Endowments and Guidance
- Incumbent
- Assumed office 14 March 2011
- President: Abd Rabbuh Mansur Al-Hadi
- Preceded by: Hamoud al-Hitar

Minister of Youth and Sport
- In office 2010 – 14 March 2011
- President: Ali Abdullah Saleh
- Succeeded by: Aref Awad Azwka

Personal details
- Born: (Yemen)

Hamoud Muhammed Ou'bad (also Hamoud Mohammed Abad) was appointed Yemen's Minister of Religious Endowments and Guidance on 14 March 2011 after serving as Yemeni Minister of Youth and Sport where he was superseded by Aref Awad Azwka (Aref Awad Azwka).

== See also ==
- Cabinet of Yemen
