= Yahya al-Abyadh =

Yemeni politician

Yahya al-Abyadh Arabic: يحيى الأبيض is a Yemeni politician. He served as Minister of Electricity and Water from 2001 to 2003.

== Education ==
Al-Abyadh was born in Sana'a, Yemen. He received his BA in electrical engineering from Germany.
