= Mohamad Khadim Al Wajih =

Yemeni politician and economist

Muhammad Al-Khadam Ghalib Al-Wajih was a Yemeni politician and cabinet minister.

He was born in 1940 in Zabid. He is a member of a prominent family from Tihama. He was educated in Aden 1948-1960 and in UK 1960-1965. He has an economics degree from University of London.

He was director of Yemen Petroleum Company in 1971 in North Yemen. He was appointed minister of agriculture from 1975 to 1979. He was appointed as minister of education in March 1979. He was appointed as minister of finance in 1986. He was appointed as minister of communications in 1988. After Yemeni unification, he was appointed minister of civil service from May 1991 to June 1995. Then he was appointed minister of petroleum and minerals from 1996 to 2000.

He died on 20 April 2016 while receiving treatment at a hospital in Amman.
