= Abdullah al-Dafa'i =

Yemeni politician (born 1959)

- عبد الله حسين الدفعي

Ambassador of Yemen to the United Arab Emirates
- In office 20 September 2007 – 19 May 2013
- President: Abdrabbuh Mansour Hadi
- Preceded by: Abdulwahed Mohamed Fara
- Succeeded by: Ahmed Saleh

Personal details
- Born: 1959
- Died: 30 October 2015 (aged 55–56)

Abdullah Hussein al-Dafa'i (Arabic: عبد الله حسين الدفعي; 1959 – 30 October 2015) was a Yemeni politician. He was previously minister of housing and urban planning from 1998 to 2001 and then as minister of public works and highways from 2001 to 2006. He served as the ambassador of Yemen to the United Arab Emirates from 20 September 2007 to 19 May 2013.

== Education ==
Al-Dafa'i was born in 1959 in Sanaa Governorate. He studied civil engineering in United States.
