= Sanaa University =

University in Sanaa, Yemen

Sana'a University
- جامعة صنعاء
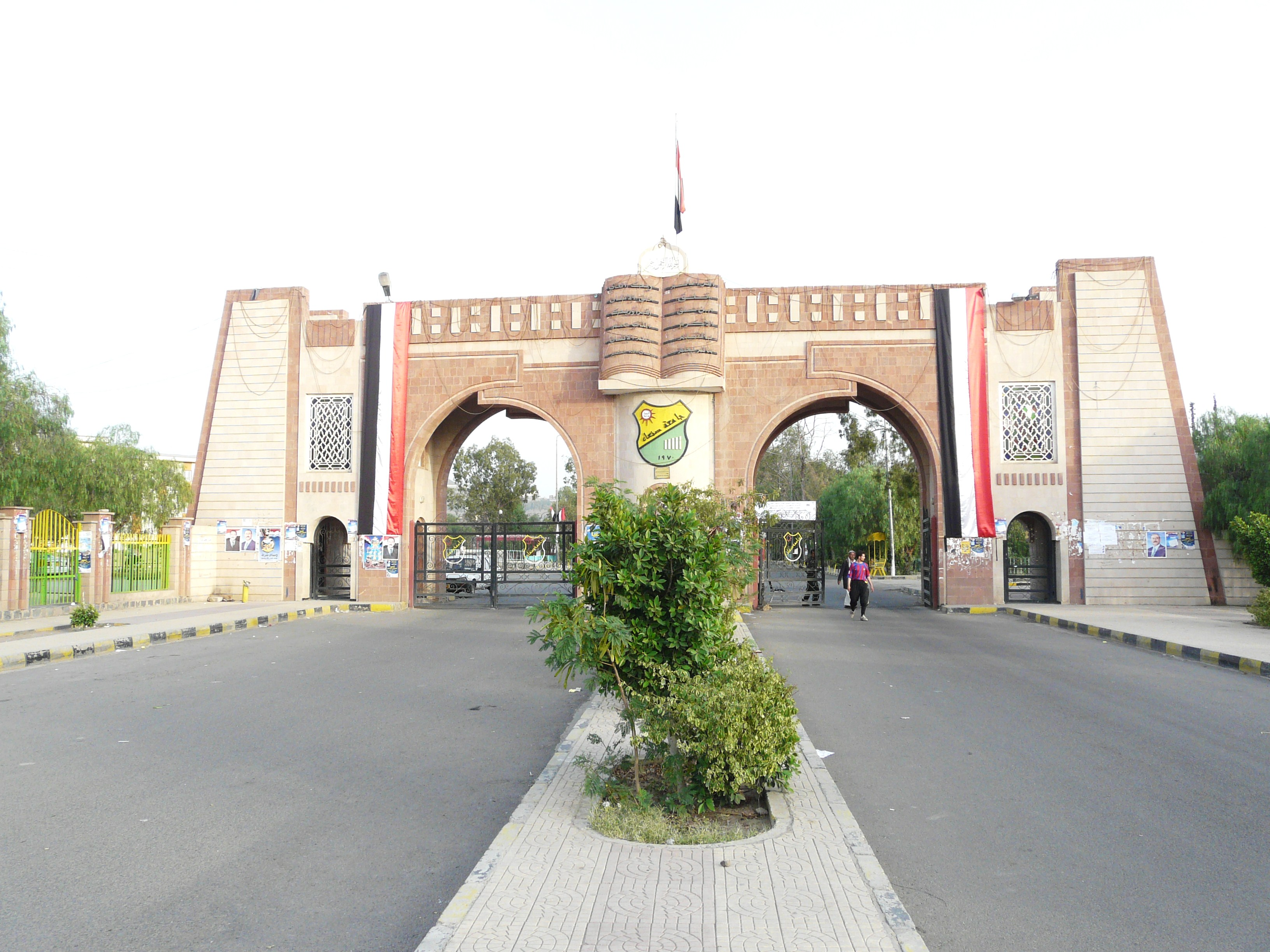
- Type: Public
- Established: 1970; 56 years ago
- Chancellor: Dr. Abdulhakim Al-Sharjbi
- President: Dr. Faozi Alsagheer
- Students: Around 8,000–14,000 every year
- Location: Sanaa, Yemen; 15°21′54.33″N 44°11′4.08″E
- Campus: Urban
- Website: su.edu.ye

Sana'a university (Arabic: جامعة صنعاء Jāmiʿat Ṣanʿāʾ) was established in 1970 as the first and the primary university in the Yemen Arab Republic (North Yemen), now the Republic of Yemen (see also Aden University). It is located in Sanaa, the capital of Yemen, and is currently organized with 17 faculties. Previously the university was located at 15°20′53.16″N 44°11′26.83″E. The university includes several accommodation buildings for staff and students and is partnered with the Kuwait University Hospital for medical students.

== Overview ==
When Sanaa university was first established, it had two faculties: the Faculty of Sharia and Law and the Faculty of Education, which also included the specialties of Colleges of Arts, Sciences and Education. In 1974, those specialties were developed and formed three new faculties: Arts, Science, Education. The Faculty of Sharia and Law celebrated the launch of the Business Department, which became an independent faculty a year later. By that time, the university included five faculties and continued expansion until it included the rest of the other specialties. As of 2005, Sanaa University was composed of twenty faculties with 12 faculties at the main campus of Sanaa and eight others at different branches throughout the country.

The university started postgraduate studies at the start of the 1980s.

== Faculties ==
- Faculty of Engineering
- Faculty of Computer & Information Technology
- Faculty of Commerce & Economics
- Faculty of Medicine
- Faculty of Dentistry
- Faculty of Pharmacy
- Faculty of Science
- Faculty of Agriculture
- Faculty of Law & Legislation
- Faculty of Education
- Faculty of Art
- Faculty of Languages
- Faculty of Publication

== Notable alumni ==
- Hoda Ablan, poet
- Khalid Ahmed, Professor of Arabic language, University of Washington
- Hamid al-Ahmar, politician
- Yahya Al-Mutawakel, Minister of Industry and Trade
- Saleh Ali al-Sammad, leader of Houthi Movement
- Mohsen Ayed, journalist and author
- Tawakel Karman earned a graduate degree in political science. She was awarded the 2011 Nobel Peace Prize. She is the first Yemeni citizen and first Arab woman to win a Nobel Prize
- Ahmed Mohammed, politician
- Ahmad Awad bin Mubarak, Prime Minister of Yemen

== Notable faculty ==
- Nasser al-Aulaqi, Yemeni Agriculture Minister and president of Sanaa University.
- Tariq Najm, Chief of Staff to the Prime Minister of Iraq

== See also ==
- List of Islamic educational institutions
- List of universities in Yemen
