= Abdul Wahab Raweh =

Yemeni politician (born 1952)

Dr. Abdulwahab Raweh د. عبدالوهاب راوح

Personal details
- Born: 1952 (age 73–74) Taiz, Yemen
- Party: General People's Congress GPC

Dr. Abdulwahab Abdo Raweh (Arabic: د. عبدالوهاب عبده راوح) (born in 1952) is an active Yemeni politician and was in the Yemeni cabinets (1994 through 2006). He has been in the cabinets of Abdul Aziz Abdul Ghani (1994–1997), Faraj Said Bin Ghanem (1997–1998), Abdul Karim al-Iryani (1998–2001), and Abdul Qadir Bajamal (2001–2006). In 2006, he became the president of Aden University in Yemen until 15 June 2008, when he was elected in the Shoora Council of Yemen.

== Political career ==
Dr. Abdulwahab Raweh held posts as Minister of Youth and Sports (1994–2001), Minister of Civil Services and Insurance (4 April 2001 – 2003), and Minister of Higher Education and Scientific Research (2003–2006).

== Other activities ==
On 13 November 2006 he was elected the president of Al-Telal club.

== Background and Private life ==
Dr. Abdulwahab Raweh was born in mount Saber in Taiz city. He studied Arabic literature in Sana'a and traveled to Egypt where he obtained his Master and Ph.D. degrees. He went back to Yemen and taught Arabic Literature in the faculty of Art at Sana'a university. A year later, he became the vice dean of the same faculty he taught in. Years Later he became the dean of the faculty of higher education after which he became the minister of Youth and Sports.

Dr. Abdulwahab Raweh is married and has two sons, Ayman and Haitham.

Preceded by Dr. Al-Kabab	Minister of Youth and Sports; 1994–2001	Succeeded by Mr. Abdulrahman Al-Akwa'
Preceded by Mr. Ahmed Al-Juned	Minister of Insurance and Civil Services; 2001–2003	Succeeded by Mr. Khaled Hamoud Al-Sofi
Preceded by Dr. Yihya Al-Shu'aibi	Minister of Higher Education and Scientific Research; 2003–2006	Succeeded by Mr.Saleh BaSorrah
Preceded by Dr. AbdulKareem Rasse'	President of Aden University; 2006–2008	Succeeded by Dr. Abdulaziz Saleh Bin Haptor
