= Abdulrahman al-Akwa'a =

Yemeni politician

Abdulrahman al-Akwa'a (Arabic: عبدالرحمن الأكوع; born 1952) is a Yemeni politician and MP. He held the post of Minister of Information from 1996 to 2001.

== Biography ==
He was born in 1952 in Sana'a. He received his BA in economics from Sana'a University. He has been a GPC MP since 2003. He served as deputy ministers of Information and Culture before his appointment as minister of Information in 1996 and Minister of Youth and Sports in 2001.
