= Abdul Qadir Bajamal =

Yemeni politician (1946–2020)

- عبد القادر باجمال
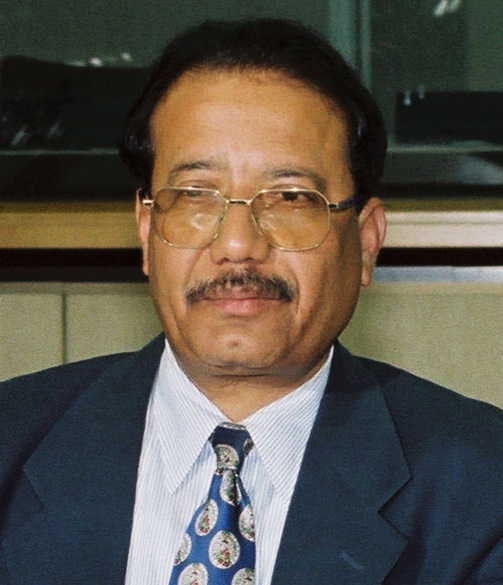
- Bajamal in 1997

5th Prime Minister of Yemen
- In office 31 March 2001 – 7 April 2007
- President: Ali Abdullah Saleh
- Preceded by: Abd Al-Karim Al-Iryani
- Succeeded by: Ali Muhammad Mujawar

Minister of Foreign Affairs of Yemen
- In office 1998 – 4 April 2001
- President: Ali Abdullah Saleh
- Prime Minister: Abd Al-Karim Al-Iryani
- Preceded by: Abd Al-Karim Al-Iryani
- Succeeded by: Abu Bakr al-Qirbi

Personal details
- Born: 18 February 1946 Al-Ghurfah, Aden Protectorate (now Yemen)
- Died: 7 September 2020 (aged 74) Dubai, United Arab Emirates
- Party: Yemeni Socialist Party (1978–1989); General People's Congress (1990–2008)
- Education: Cairo University

Abdul Qadir Bajamal (Note: Arabic: عبد القادر باجمال) (18 February 1946 – 7 September 2020) was a Yemeni politician who served as Prime Minister from 31 March 2001 to 7 April 2007. He was a member of the General People's Congress party and was appointed Prime Minister by President Ali Abdullah Saleh. Previously he served as Foreign Minister from 1998 to 2001, and Deputy Prime Minister of Yemen from 1994 to 2001.

Bajamal died on 7 September 2020 in the United Arab Emirates.

== Early life ==
Bajamal was born on 18 February 1946 in al-Ghurfah, a village in Seiyun district of what is now Hadhramaut Governorate. He pursued education in Egypt, graduating from Cairo University with a Bachelor of Commerce in 1974, before receiving a specialist degree in planning in 1978 and in financial management in 1979. While studying, he joined the Arab Nationalists Students Union, part of the Arab Nationalist Movement, in 1966, eventually becoming its leader by 1969.

== Career ==
Bajamal joined the Yemeni Socialist Party upon its inception, serving as Deputy Secretary of the Central Committee of the Yemeni Socialist Party in 1978, and becoming a member of the Central Committee in 1980. He was appointed to various government positions in South Yemen, such as the Minister of Planning in 1979, the Minister of Industry in 1980, and the Minister of Energy and Minerals in 1985. He was also a professor at the Faculty of Economics in the University of Aden from 1978 to 1980.

Bajawal was arrested and imprisoned during the South Yemen crisis of 1986 on charges of betraying socialism and for supporting then-President Ali Nasser Muhammad. After being released in 1989 he left to North Yemen, and by the time the two states had unified the next year, he had joined the ruling-General People's Congress. Dedicating much of his activities to the southern and eastern governorates of Yemen, Bajawal had become a member of the GPC Central Committee in 1990, and was named Chairman of the General Authority for Free Zones the next year. During the 1994 civil war, Bajamal was Deputy Prime Minister under the Abdulaziz Abdulghani cabinet as well as the Minister of Planning; the latter role he retained in the cabinet of Faraj bin Ghanem. During his tenure as planning minister, he sought to revive economic activity at the Port of Aden, eventually reaching a deal a $187 million with the Port of Singapore Authority in 1997 to build new quays and a container terminal at the port.

=== Foreign minister ===
From 1998 to 2001, Bajamal was appointed Deputy Prime Minister as well as the Minister of Foreign Affairs under Abdul Karim al-Iyrani. As foreign minister, Bajamal was recognized for exceeding relations with the Gulf states. In the aftermath of the July 1998 border clashes between Yemen and Saudi Arabia, Bajamal was sent to the neighbouring country in order to resolve the dispute. He stated that "a collapse in security between Yemen and Saudi Arabia would be a collapse in security for the whole region". Bajamal was a central negotiator and signee of the Treaty of Jeddah on 12 June 2000, which established an official border between Yemen and Saudi Arabia to end the long-running dispute.

Upon the outbreak of the Second Intifada during clashes in Jerusalem, Yemen was among the many Arab nations criticizing Israel, with Bajamal stating that "Yemen condemns the savage massacre...(and) calls on the United States, the broker of the Middle East peace process, to firmly intervene to end Israel's occupation of Arab land and restrain its aggressive policy."

Two months after the USS Cole bombing in October 2000, Bajamal conducted an interview with Associated Press in which he claimed that the United States was somewhat responsible for the terrorist attack, as it had funded the Afghan Arabs during the Soviet–Afghan War who had come to be their greatest adversaries by that point. He was certain that no Yemenis were the main orchestrators of the attack as "We are a victim of terrorism, not a source of terrorism." Regardless, he iterated his support for cooperation with the US regarding counterterrorism.

== Prime Minister ==
Bajamal served three consecutive terms as Prime Minister of Yemen from 2001 to 2007. He was first appointed prime minister on 31 March 2001 via a presidential decree after his predecessor, al-Iryani, officially resigned for medical purposes amid widespread unpopularity due to allegations of corruption. His initial appointment as prime minister was met with enthusiasm from the Yemeni public. He declared during his first official speech that "security, stability, civil peace and law and order are among the top missions of this government."

A month after parliamentary elections took place and the first Bajamal Cabinet had been dissolved, on 18 May 2003 the Yemeni cabinet was reshuffled, with Bajamal keeping his position as prime minister. Of the 35 seats, 17 were replaced with new ministers, though it was not seen as a major shift as the ministers of interior, oil, defense, information and finance were all kept in place. Bajamal was credited with forming the Ministry of Water and Environment as well as the Environment Protection Authority in 2003.

=== Economic policy ===
Saleh emphasized to Bajamal and his cabinet from their first meeting that "implementing financial and administrative decentralisation" consistent with an economic reform program launched in 1995 and endorsed by the International Monetary Fund and World Bank would be a central policy of his government. On 6 May 2001, his government's agenda was approved by a vote in parliament, though MPs from the Islah, Nasserite Union, Baath parties disproved of it in a statement.

During a parliament session in September 2004, the house rejected the Saleh government's attempted motion to increase costs for fuel in order to acquire more funding for economic reforms and development projects. After the heated debate, Bajamal was forced to leave through the back door of the building to avoid the angered bodyguards of Yemeni MPs who were occupying the front entrance.

On 26 December 2004, Bajamal was blocked from entering parliament by armed entourages of multiple MPs, who berated him for his economic policies and threatened him. The Prime Minister's own personal guard eventually managed to allow him access into the building, as parliamentary guards dispersed after authorities arrived to the scene. House of Representative vice-speaker Yahya Ali al-Raee adjourned the session "until every MP can control his bodyguards, until there is a state and real Parliament," while ordering an investigation. Bajamal returned to the parliament regardless days after, defending his economic reforms as debated revolved around $4-billion draft budget for the 2005 fiscal year.

On 18 July 2005, the Bajamal cabinet announced that it had cut fuel subsidies in order to comply with the economic reform program. The decision was approved of and implemented by midnight on 20 July. Bajamal stated that the government was intending to cut $500 million worth of annual subsidies in order to address budget shortfalls, and would compensate for the price increases with lower custom tariffs and general sales tax, and increased state salaries. Regardless, the act had effectively doubled fuel prices in the country overnight, while public transport fees also rose by approximately 30 percent.

=== Internal security ===
Upon the opening of a new border crossing in the Rub' al Khali in September 2003, the first since the signing of the Treaty of Jeddah, Bajamal said that it was "remarkable for the countries' relations and it is of great importance for the security of Yemen and Saudi Arabia against any activity of terrorists."

In January 2004, Bajamal announced that Aden had been completely cleared of landmines which had been placed during the 1994 civil war. He affirmed that the nationwide program to eliminate landmines in the country, which began in 1994 with support from the UN and other nations, would continue to operate.

In May 2004, Bajamal ascertained in a CNN interview that terrorist cells affiliated with al-Qaeda in Yemen had been effectively mitigated, according to him by 90 percent, since the September 11 attacks. He attributed part of the success to intelligence cooperation with the US, as well as other Arab states such as Egypt, Algeria and Saudi Arabia. He also admitted that millions of dollars' worth of lobbying was directed towards local tribes to reject providing a safe haven for al-Qaeda. He nonetheless stated that 20 to 25 experienced militants were still at-large and active in the country.

On 1 January 2006, a group of five Italian tourists were kidnapped in Marib by captors seeking the release of their fellow Zaydi tribesmen from prison. In response, Bajamal announced the next day that security forces had besieged the hostage-takers in the Sirwah mountains. He stated that the government would not negotiate nor be lenient with the captors, and would "exercise all kinds of pressure on them for a peaceful release of the hostages." The captors pledged that the hostages would be killed if any military action was taken. It was military pressure combined with tribal mediation which eventually led to the release of the hostages on 6 January. In response to hundreds of protestors denouncing kidnappings and affirming government action, Bajamal stated that the GPC was planning to introduce a debate in parliament for stricter gun control.

=== Foreign policy ===
In the aftermath of the September 11 attacks, as the US began exerting significant pressure on Yemen to address terrorism, Bajamal told pro-government newspaper al-Thawra that Yemen had deported 4,000 Arab fighters trained from Afghanistan.

In October 2003, Bajamal said in a Reuters interview that the US was issuing "absolutely impossible" demands to Yemen regarding the war on terror in relation to what he described as insufficient foreign aid. He stated that the Yemeni government was not wealthy enough to independently secure its large land and maritime borders, and that the US was unfair to demand the complete neutralization of local sleeper cells, bringing up its track record regarding the manhunt for Osama bin Laden and the other planners of the September 11 attacks by that point. US Deputy Secretary of State William Burns publicly disagreed with Bajamal's notion that Yemen was not receiving enough aid, and claimed that the American demands were also in the interest of the Yemeni government.

In March 2004, Bajmal attended a four-day official visit to China, during which he praised the rapid development of bilateral trade between the countries and announced that future expected projects would be worth US$500 million.

During the June 2005 Council of Foreign Ministers conference between the Organisation of Islamic Cooperation, which was hosted in Sanaa, Bajamal recommended that countries from the Muslim world unify themselves to achieve their goals and effective representation in the United Nations Security Council, that including "the greatest challenges in our time – the disgraceful disrespect for human rights in Palestine, Iraq, Somalia and Afghanistan" according to him.

On 29 December 2006, Bajamal sent a letter to US president George W. Bush urging him to halt the execution of Saddam Hussein, claiming it would only inflame tensions in Iraq. He also directed a message to then-Iraqi president Jalal Talabani saying: "We appeal to your wisdom and political acumen to provide the appropriate climate to heal wounds ... for the sake of the unity of the Iraqi people and stability."

== Honours ==
=== Foreign honours ===
- Italy
  - (Kingdom of the Two Sicilies) Two Sicilian Royal Family: Knight Grand Cross of the Royal Order of Francis I

== Notes ==
Political offices
Preceded by Abdul Karim al-Iryani	Prime Minister of Yemen; 2001–2007	Succeeded by Ali Mohammed Mujur
