= Mohammed Basindawa =

Yemeni politician (born 1935)

- محمد سالم باسندوة
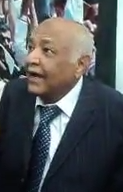
- Basindawa in 2012

7th Prime Minister of Yemen
- In office 10 December 2011 – 24 September 2014
- President: Abdrabbuh Mansur Hadi
- Deputy: Abdullah Mohsen al-Akwa; Ahmed Obeid bin Daghr
- Preceded by: Ali Muhammad Mujawar
- Succeeded by: Abdullah Mohsen al-Akwa (Acting)

Personal details
- Born: 4 April 1935 (age 91) Aden, Aden Protectorate (now Yemen)
- Party: Independent

Mohammed Salim Basindawa (Arabic: محمد سالم باسندوة, romanized: Muḥammad Sālim Bāsindawa; born 4 April 1935) is a Yemeni politician who was Prime Minister of Yemen from 10 December 2011 to 24 September 2014.

== Career ==
Born in Aden, Basindawa served as minister of foreign affairs from 1993 to 1994. He was a member of Yemen's ruling party, the General People's Congress but resigned in the early 2000s to join the opposition to President Ali Abdullah Saleh as an independent.

In November 2011, following months of unrest, Basindawa was nominated by the Yemeni opposition to lead the first government after the ouster of President Saleh. On 27 November 2011, he was named Prime Minister by Vice President Abdrabbuh Mansur Hadi. He and the members of his cabinet were sworn in on 10 December 2011.

On 31 August 2013, Basindawa narrowly escaped an assassination attempt when gunmen opened fire on his convoy.

On 21 September 2014, Basindawa resigned as Prime Minister on the same day that Houthi rebels captured Sanaa, the capital of Yemen. On 24 September, Abdullah Mohsen al-Akwa began acting prime minister.

Political offices
Preceded by Abd Al-Karim Al-Iryani	Minister of Foreign Affairs; 1993–1994	Succeeded by Abd Al-Karim Al-Iryani
Preceded by Ali Muhammad Mujawar	Prime Minister of Yemen; 2011–2014	Succeeded by Abdullah Mohsen al-Akwa; Acting
