= Alawi Saleh al-Salami =

Yemeni politician and economist

Alawi Saleh al-Salami (Arabic: علوي صالح السلامي; born in 1945 ) is a Yemeni politician and economist. Previously, he served as Deputy Prime Minister, Minister of Finance of Yemen.

== Biography ==
Alawi was born on 21 December 1945, in Rada'a, al-Bayda Governorate. He has a BA in economics and political sciences from Baghdad University. He held different positions including Minister of Finance (1986–1994), Governor of Yemen Central Bank (1994–1997), Minister of Finance (1997–2001), and deputy Prime Minister and Minister of Finance (2001–2006).
