= Ali Muhammad Mujawar =

Yemeni politician (born 1953)

- علي محمد مجور
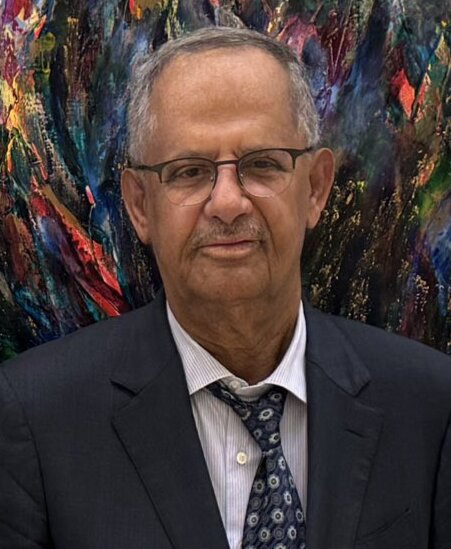
- Mujawar in 2024

Yemen’s Permanent Representative to the United Nations Office in Geneva
- Incumbent
- Assumed office 6 December 2012
- President: Abdrabbuh Mansour Hadi; Rashad al-Alimi
- Preceded by: Ibrahim Saeed al-Adoufi

7th Prime Minister of Yemen
- In office 7 April 2007 – 10 December 2011
- President: Ali Abdullah Saleh
- Preceded by: Abdul Qadir Bajamal
- Succeeded by: Mohammed Basindawa

Minister of Electricity and Energy
- In office 11 February 2006 – 7 April 2007
- President: Ali Abdullah Saleh
- Prime Minister: Abdul Qadir Bajamal
- Preceded by: Yahya al-Abyadh
- Succeeded by: Mustafa Yahya Baharan

Minister of Fisheries
- In office 17 May 2003 – 11 February 2006
- President: Ali Abdullah Saleh
- Prime Minister: Abdul Qadir Bajamal
- Preceded by: Ali Hasan al-Ahmadi
- Succeeded by: Mustafa Yahya Baharan

Personal details
- Born: 22 June 1953 (age 72) As Said District, South Arabia
- Party: General People's Congress

Ali Muhammad Mujawar (Note: Arabic: علي محمد مجور) (born 22 June 1953) is a Yemeni economist, politician and diplomat, currently serving as Yemen’s Permanent Representative to the United Nations Office in Geneva since December 2012. He previously served as the seventh Prime Minister of Yemen from 2007 to 2011, among several other ministerial posts including the Minister of Electricity and Minister of Fish Resources.

Mujawar received education in Algeria and France as an economist before heading numerous divisions at the University of Aden. His appointment as Minister of Electricity in February 2006 saw him receive recognition for his stance against corruption. President Ali Abdullah Saleh appointed Mujawar as Prime Minister in April 2007 in an effort to revive the economy and combat corruption.

Following the anti-government uprising in Yemen, Saleh fired Mujawar and the other members of his cabinet on 20 March 2011, but asked them to remain in their positions until a new government was formed. Mujawar remained loyal to Saleh during the revolution, and was considered by him as a potential replacement for Vice President Abdrabbuh Mansour Hadi. Mujawar injured in a June 2011 mosque bombing alongside Saleh, and was subsequently treated in Saudi Arabia. After returning in August, he remained in his position until 10 December, when the Gulf Cooperation Council-stipulated deal signed by Saleh the previous month required him to step down as prime minister. Disinterested in local politics, Mujawar was approved by Hadi as the head of Yemen's mission to the UN in Geneva.

== Early life and career ==
Mujawar was born on 22 June 1953 in As Said District of Shabwah Governorate. He owes his lineage to the politically-influential Awaleq tribe. He received primary and secondary education in Yemen before moving to Algeria, where he earned a bachelor's degree in economic management at Algeria University in 1981. He later pursued studies in France at the Grenoble Alpes University, where he received a master's degree in economic management in 1987 and a doctorate in production management in 1991. Mujawar later returned to Yemen, where he held multiple positions at the University of Aden, including the head for Business Administration Department from 1994 to 1996, the Dean of the Faculty of Oil and Minerals from 1996 to 1999, then the Dean of the Faculty of Economics and Management, and later the Dean of the Faculty of Administrative Sciences until March 2002.

From then onwards, Mujawar was appointed to several ministerial positions in the government of Yemen; the Deputy Minister of Civil Service and Insurance from April 2002 to January 2003, and the Minister of Fish Resources from May 2003 to February 2006. He also managed the public sector of the al-Barah Cement Factory from January to May 2003. On 11 February 2006, he was appointed the Minister of Electricity as part of a cabinet reshuffle. Mujawar distinguished himself for his efforts to fight corruption while in the post, which included orders to shut off the electricity to a General People's Congress (GPC) regional office after it had not paid its bills in five years.

== Prime Minister ==
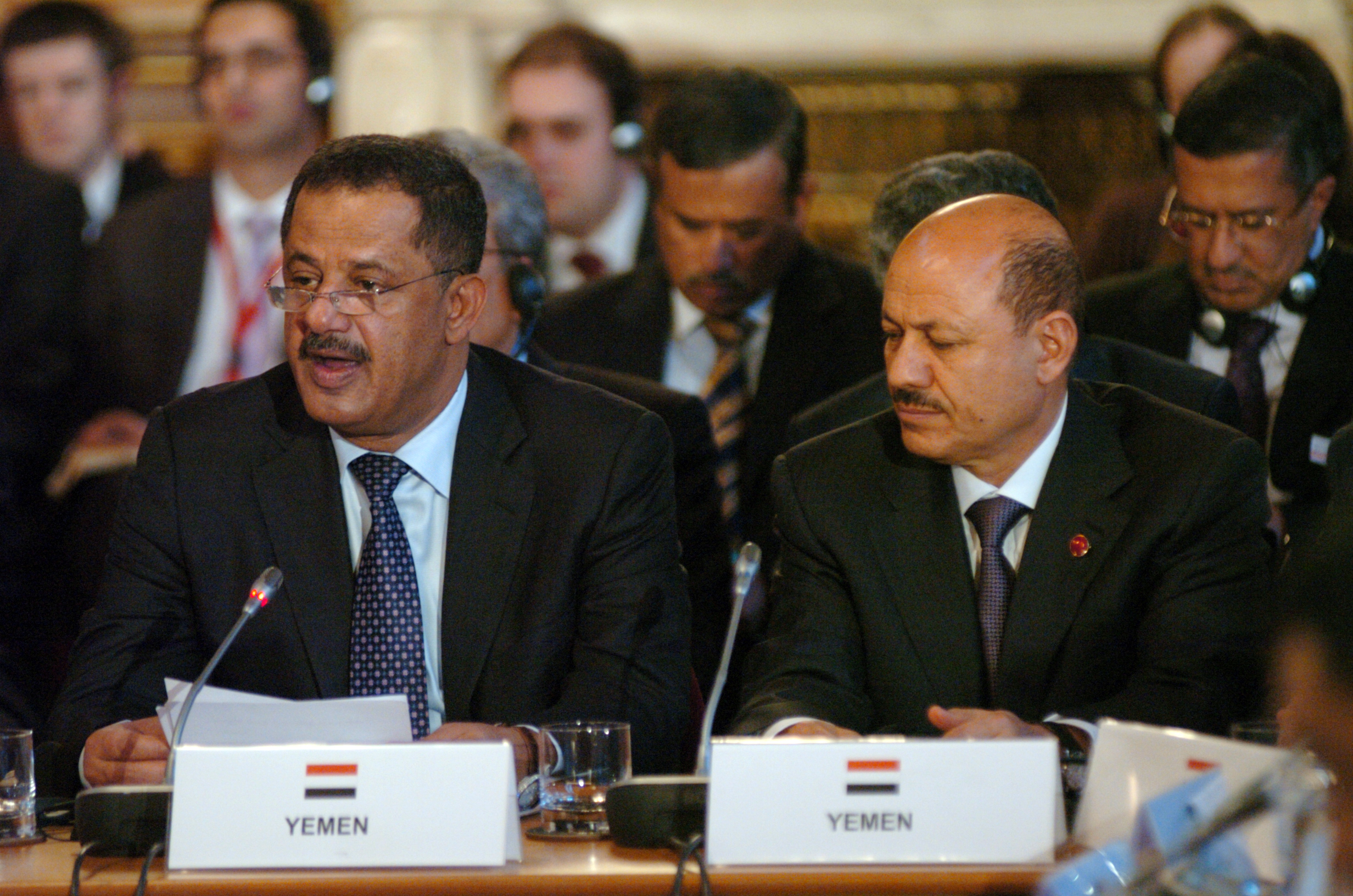
Mujawar at a conference in London, 2010

On 31 March 2007, President Ali Abdullah Saleh issued a decree announcing that Mujawar wound be appointed as the seventh Prime Minister of Yemen, replacing Abdul Qadir Bajamal. As per the country's laws, Mujawar was given two weeks to form a new cabinet and would have to seek approval from the President and the Parliament.

Saleh, who had recently won another term in the 2006 presidential election, wrote to the outgoing prime minister that the move was to "achieve positive results on both levels of development and investment," and remain consistent with his campaign goals, which focused on improving the economy and eliminating poverty. Mujawar's appointment as prime minister was seen by commentators as a move by Saleh to assure international spectators, such as the World Bank, that he would attest to corruption in the country, as he had been facing pressure to do so by the international community. It was also interpreted as a "division of labour" where Mujawar would focus on the economy of Yemen, Bajamal would handle politics relating to the GPC, which he was the head of, and Saleh occupied himself with combating the Houthi insurgency.

The Mujawar Cabinet was inaugurated on 7 April. It included twelve new members and the reintroduction of the Ministry of Expatriate Affairs. During a meeting with the cabinet after their swearing in, Saleh emphasized the importance of fighting corruption, nepotism and price gouging and fixing for the sake of the Yemeni public. Mujawar stated that his cabinet will hold itself responsible for shortcomings, though he "requested non-intervention by government authorities" in these situations. He also said that his cabinet would "give special attention to creating a (positive) investment climate and remove obstacles hindering investment."

In an Agence France-Presse interview later in April, Mujawar said that the Houthis had rejected negotiations with the government, and asserted that military conflict was the only solution to end the insurgency. He claimed that the Houthis had suffered significant losses in an army offensive, and were receiving support from Libya and Iran.

On 14 November 2007, it was announced that the 18th session of the Saudi-Yemeni Coordination Council in Riyadh, headed by Saudi prince Sultan Bin Abdulaziz and Mujawar on the Yemeni side, concluded in an agreement to construct a border barrier between the two countries.

Prince Andrew, trade envoy of the United Kingdom, met with Mujawar among other top officials in Sanaa as the guest of honor for a luncheon in December 2009, where he urged a stronger trade relationship between the countries. He later spoke with Mujawar personally in London at a terrorism conference in January 2010, informing him on "the British willingness to advance its cooperation with Yemen, particularly in commercial and investment areas." A year later, reports showed that the UK government had authorized the sale of £160,000 worth of ammunition and body armor to Yemen.

During a meeting with meeting with Asian and African ambassadors in Sanaa on 5 November 2010 to discuss terrorism, Mujawar claimed that al-Qaeda in the Arabian Peninsula (AQAP) was a creation of the West. Mujawar had previously rejected the notion that the Yemeni government should be expected to capture Anwar al-Awlaki, instead putting it up to the US.

=== Yemeni revolution ===
On 7 February 2011, Mujawar asserted during an interview with CNN that Yemen was a democratic country as it regularly hosted elections, and thus did not need protests. He accused the Joint Meeting Parties opposition group of imposing regime change upon the populace of Yemen in an attempt to mimic the revolutions in Egypt and Tunisia, and warned that their destabilization efforts would benefit AQAP. On 9 February, he reported that Saleh's offer to step down as president upon the end of his term in 2013 received a positive response from the international community, just after British Foreign Secretary William Hague had concluded a meeting with Saleh. On 25 February, amid intensifying protests, the state-ran Saba News Agency reported that Saleh had assigned Mujawar to head a dialogue committee which would communicate with the opposition. On 5 March, Mujawar was blocked by opposition protestors as he was attempting to reach a meeting with the opposition at Sanaa University.

On 20 March, Saleh issued a presidential decree announcing the firing of Mujawar and his cabinet. The mass-sacking had been expected by the Saleh regime as many ministers were planning to resign on their own initiative together. One pro-Saleh official said that "This government was supposed to change a while ago; it passed its deadline. This isn’t a big surprise." However, despite the decree, Saba News Agency reported that Saleh had told Mujawar to take the role of caretaker prime minister and the other ministers to remain in their positions until a new government was formed.

Mujawar remained loyal to Saleh throughout the revolution, even after his firing. He spoke at a rally featuring tens of thousands of Saleh supporters on 1 April where he said "We send a message from the Yemeni majority to them (the opposition) and the whole world ... of our support for the nation and for our leader." By April, Saleh was considering to have Mujawar replace Abdrabbuh Mansour Hadi as Vice President of Yemen. In the case that he was forced out of office, Saleh preferred to have an "enabler" succeed him, through which he could maintain power. Mujawar was a potential candidate, though he declined the offer.

Mujawar was wounded alongside several other top officials, including Saleh, during a targeted mosque bombing on 3 June 2011. Mujawar sustained significant severe burns and wounds to the back as he had been standing directly next to Saleh as they were praying. He alongside other officials were flown to Saudi Arabia for treatment. He returned to Sanaa on 23 August 2011 as the first of the wounded senior officials to return to office, receiving hundreds of supporters and other officials at the airport.

On 27 November 2011, days after Saleh signed an agreement confirming his planned resignation, Hadi announced that Mujawar would be replaced by Mohammed Basindawa, a figure of the opposition, as interim prime minister of a national reconciliation government. The new cabinet was announced on 7 December, and was sworn in three days later. Hadi met with Mujawar and his former cabinet and thanked them for service in combating corruption in the country.

== United Nations representative ==
On 29 August 2012, Hadi issued a decree appointing Mujawar as Yemen’s Permanent Representative to the United Nations Office in Geneva, succeeding Ibrahim Saeed al-Adoufi. Mujawar reportedly wanted the position in order to step away from domestic politics. On 6 December 2012, he presented his credentials to Director-General of the UN Office, Kassym-Jomart Tokayev.

On behalf of forty countries at the 58th meeting of the Human Rights Council on 3 March 2025, Mujawar released a collective statement recognizing Morocco's sovereignty over the Western Sahara, and praising its abidance and engagement with the UN human rights system. Speaking on the Western Sahara conflict, he said "Resolving this regional dispute would help fulfill the legitimate aspirations of African and Arab peoples for integration and development, an objective that Morocco continues to pursue with sincere and ongoing efforts."

== Personal life ==
Mujawar is married and has seven children. Upon the death of his mother in October 2020, Prime Minister Abdulaziz bin Habtoor of the Houthi-led government offered him condolences. His brother, Saleh Mujawar, died 12 May 2024, whereupon he received condolences from Presidential Leadership Council head Rashad al-Alimi.

== Notes ==
Political offices
Preceded by Abdul Qadir Bajamal	Prime Minister of Yemen; 2007–2011	Succeeded by Mohammed Basindawa
