= Sadeq Amin Abu Rass =

Yemeni politician (born 1952)

- صادق أمين أبو راس
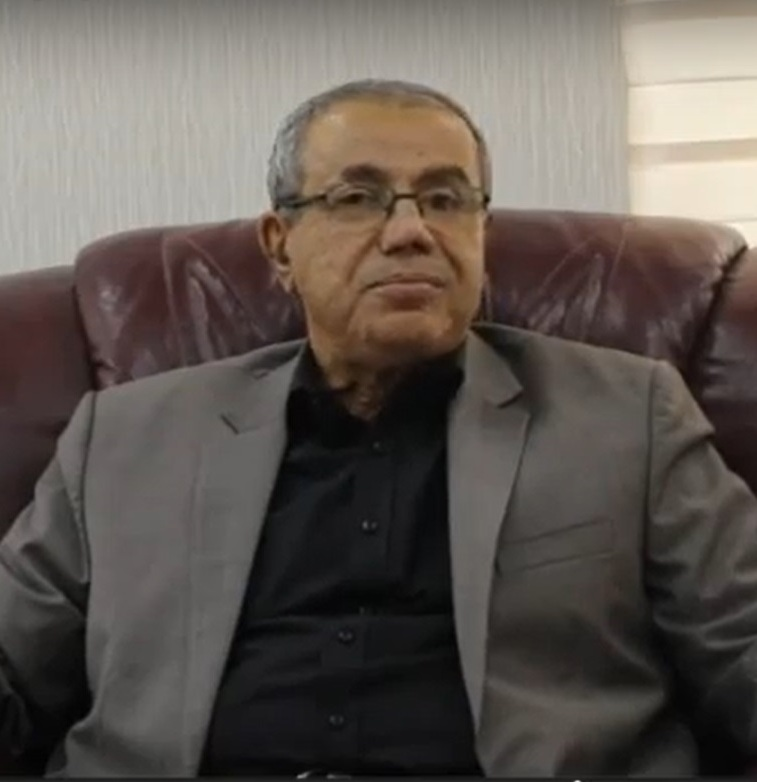

Deputy Chairman of the Supreme Political Council of Yemen
- Incumbent
- Assumed office 24 August 2022
- President: Mahdi al-Mashat
- Preceded by: Qassem Labozah

Chairman of the General People’s Congress
- Incumbent
- Assumed office 7 January 2018; Disputed with Abdrabbuh Mansur Hadi and Ahmed Saleh
- Preceded by: Ali Abdullah Saleh

Member of the Supreme Political Council
- Incumbent
- Assumed office 15 August 2016
- President: Saleh Ali al-Sammad

Personal details
- Born: 1952 (age 73–74) Bart Al Anan District, Al Jawf Governorate, North Yemen
- Party: General People’s Congress (Pro-Houthi faction)
- Relations: Faisal Amin Abu Rass (brother)

Sadeq Amin Abu Rass (Arabic: صادق أمين أبو راس, romanized: Ṣādiq ʾAmīn ʾAbū Rāss; born 1952) is the Chairperson of the Sanaa-based General People’s Congress. Sadeq Rass was named the GPC’s Leader on January 7, 2018, following previous leader Ali Abdullah Saleh’s death on December 4, 2017, during the Battle of Sanaa. Sadeq Rass had served as an agriculture minister and local administration minister before his appointment, as Governor of Taiz Governorate, and in the Republic of Yemen Armed Forces.

He was wounded in the June 2011 assassination attempt on President Ali Abdullah Saleh and was taken to Saudi Arabia for treatment during the Yemeni revolution. Several leaders of the GPC later rejected his appointment. His brother is Faisal Amin Abu Rass.
