= Ministry of Finance (Yemen) =

Government ministry of Yemen

Republic of Yemen Ministry of Finance
- Emblem of Yemen

Ministry overview
- Formed: 1990
- Jurisdiction: Yemen
- Ministry executive: Marwan Faraj Saeed bin Ghanem / Abdulrab Ahmed, Minister of Finance
- Website: mof-yemen.com (SPC)

The Ministry of Finance (Arabic: وزارة المالية) is a cabinet ministry of Yemen responsible for public finances.

موقع وزارة المالية الرسمي لمحافظة عدن

== List of ministers ==
Finance ministers of North Yemen and finance ministers of South Yemen prior unification in 1990.

Name	Took office	Left office	Notes
Alawi Saleh al-Salami	1990	1994	
Muhammad Ahmad al-Junayd	1994	1997	
Alawi Saleh al-Salami	1997	2006	
Saif Mahuob al-Asali	2006	2007	
Noman al-Suhaibi	2007	2011	
Sakhr al-Wajih	3 January 2012	11 June 2014	
Muhammad Zamam	11 June 2014	9 June 2015	
Mansar al-Quaiti	11 October 2015	18 September 2016	
Ahmad Obaid al-Fadhli	18 September 2016	19 September 2019	
Salem Saleh bin Braik	19 September 2019	6 February 2026	In Aden
Marwan Faraj Saeed bin Ghanem	6 February 2026	Incumbent	In Aden
Abu Lahoum	2020	2024	In Sanaa
Abdulrab Ahmed	2024	Incumbent	In Sanaa

== See also ==
- Cabinet of Yemen
- Politics of Yemen
- Central Bank of Yemen
- Minister of Finance of North Yemen
- Minister of Finance of South Yemen
