= Ministry of Public Health and Population =

Government ministry of Yemen

Ministry overview
- Formed: 1990
- Jurisdiction: Government of Yemen
- Headquarters: Aden (PLC), Sana'a (SPC)
- Minister responsible: Qassem Bahaibah, Minister of Public Health and Population
- Website: moh-ye.org

Ministry of Public Health and Population (Arabic: وزارة الصحة العامة والسكان) is a governmental ministry of Yemen. It covers public health and demographics.

== Overview ==
Under the constitution of Yemen, all Yemeni citizens have the right to receive healthcare. The Public Health Law stipulates that the Ministry of Public Health and Population is responsible for overseeing the provision of healthcare at the primary, secondary, tertiary and specialized levels in all governorate of Yemen. The healthcare system was heavily managed by the ministry until a decentralization process in the early 2000s transferred more responsibilities to governorate health offices. In this system, the ministry is responsible for setting national health policies and strategies which are carried out by each governorate health office. The ministry directs four primary fields: primary health care, population health, curative care and planning and development.

According to Conflict and Health, prior to the Yemeni civil war the ministry "operated a four-tier system, including health units and centers at the first level, governorate and district hospitals at the second level, a limited number of referral hospitals at the third level, and a smaller number of specialized centers and hospitals at the fourth level." Beginning in 2009 during the height of the Houthi insurgency, the Ministry of Public Health and Population implemented a health cluster approach in northern Yemen to coordinate a health response to the humanitarian crisis alongside various international organizations. This system was replicated on a nationwide scale to respond to the humanitarian crisis during the civil war since 2015.

The civil war has greatly impacted the healthcare system in Yemen. The country has suffered a brain drain of qualified healthcare officials in part because the ministry has been unable to pay for their salaries. According to an official, the ministry has looked to "alternative solutions" such as partnering with humanitarian organisations to "provide financial incentives for the remaining medical staff." To address the shorting comings in healthcare provision, the ministry collaborated with the World Health Organization (WHO) in 2017 to introduce minimum health service packages, a strategy featuring various guidelines to improve the provision of primary and secondary healthcare services in the country.

=== Houthi-ran ministry ===
Along with other institutions amidst the civil war, a rival ministry of health has operated in Houthi-controlled Yemen, which directly negotiates with international organizations operating in said territories.

== List of ministers ==
- Qassem Mohamad Qassem Bahaibah (18 December 2020–presente)
- Naser Mohsen Ba'aum, (14 September 2015 – 17 December 2020)
- Reyad Yassin Abdulla ( 8 November 2014 – 14 September 2015)

== See also ==
- Cabinet of Yemen
- Politics of Yemen
- Health in Yemen
