= Deputy Prime Minister of Yemen =

Deputy Prime Minister of the Republic of Yemen
- Emblem of Yemen
- Incumbent; Vacant since 17 December 2020
- Style: His Excellency
- Residence: Aden, Yemen
- Appointer: President of Yemen
- Formation: 22 May 1990

The Deputy Prime Minister of the Republic of Yemen is the deputy head of government of Yemen.

According to the Constitution of Yemen, the Deputy Prime Minister is appointed by the President.

The first person to hold the position of Deputy Prime Minister of Yemen after unification was Mohammed Hassan Makki.

Last former Deputies Prime Ministers of Yemen are Ahmed al-Maisari and Ahmed Saeed al-Khanbashi.
