= Timeline of Sanaa =

The following is a timeline of the history of the city of Sana'a, Yemen.

== Prior to 20th century ==
- 530 CE - Abraha in power, with Sana'a as his capital (approximate date).
- 570 - Siege of Sana'a (570); Sassanids in power.
- 715 - Great Mosque of Sana'a building expanded.
- 869 - Hiwali Yufirids in power (approximate date).
- 901 - Town occupied by forces of Zaidi Yahya bin al-Husain.
- 905 - Karmatian Ali bin al-Fadl in power.
- 915 - Yufirid As'ad bin Ibrahim in power.
- 956 - Town taken by Zaidi Mukhtar.
- 1062 - Ali al-Sulayhi in power.
- 1067 - Sulayhid capital relocated from Sana'a to Jibla by Arwa al-Sulayhi (approximate date).
- 1221 - Rasulid Badr al-Din Hasan in power.
- 1259 - Earthquake.
- 1538 - Ottomans in power.
- 1602 - Ottomans ousted.
- 1872 - Ottomans in power; Sana'a becomes capital of the Yemen Vilayet.
- 1887 - Population: 25,000 (estimate).
- 1891
  - Uprising against Turkish rule.
  - Population: 50,000 (estimate).

== 20th century ==
- 1902 - Dar as-Sanay built.
- 1905 - Uprising against Turkish rule.
- 1911 - Political unrest.
- 1918 - Turkish rule ends.
- 1921 - Population: 25,000 (approximate estimate).
- 1948
  - 17 February: Imam Yahya assassinated.
  - Al-Waziri coup.
- 1952 - Al-Ahli Club Sana'a (football club) formed.
- 1954 - Al-Wehda Club (football club) formed.
- 1956 - Population: 60,000 (estimate).
- 1962
  - September: Military coup;
  - City becomes capital of the Yemen Arab Republic.
  - Al-Thawra newspaper begins publication.
- 1967 - November: Siege of Sana'a (1967) begins.
- 1970 - Sana'a University established.
- 1971 - National Museum of Yemen established in Dar al-Shukr.
- 1974 - June: Military coup; Ibrahim al-Hamdi in power.
- 1975
  - Installation of water supply system begins.
  - Population: 140,339 (estimate).
- 1981 - 280,000.
- 1982 - French Center for Archaeology and Social Sciences established.
- 1983 - Sana'a University Museum built.
- 1984 - Military Museum and General Organisation for the Preservation of Old Sana'a established.
- 1986
  - Ali Mohsen Al-Muraisi Stadium and Althawra Sports City Stadium open.
  - Old City designated an UNESCO World Heritage Site.
  - Population: 427,505.
- 1987 - Sultan Palace Hotel in business.
- 1988 - Women's Technical School built.
- 1990
  - City becomes capital of the Republic of Yemen.
  - Central Bank of Yemen headquartered in city.
- 1991 - Yemen Times newspaper begins publication.
- 1994 - Population: 973,548.
- 1995 - San'a Institute for the Arabic Language established.
- 1996 - Yemen Observer newspaper begins publication.

== 21st century ==
=== 2000s ===
- 2004 - House of Folklore museum established.
- 2008
  - Saleh Mosque built.
  - 17 September: 2008 attack on the American Embassy in Yemen.
  - November: Political demonstration.
  - Al-Oruba football club formed.
- 2009 - Population: 1,976,286.

=== 2010s ===
- 2011
  - 23 May-7 June: Battle of Sana'a (2011) (first phase).
  - 18 September-25 November: Battle of Sana'a (2011) (second phase).
  - 2011 Yemeni protests.
- 2012 - 21 May: 2012 Sana'a bombing.
- 2014
  - 16–21 September: Battle of Sana'a (2014).
  - 21 September: 2014–15 Yemeni coup d'état begins.
  - 9 October: Bombing in Tahrir Square.
- 2015
  - January 2015 Sana'a bombing
  - 20 January: Houthis take Presidential Palace.
  - 20 March: 2015 Sana'a mosque bombings.
  - April: Airstrike.
- 2016
  - 2016–17 Yemen cholera outbreak begins.
  - Yemen Supreme Political Council headquartered in city.

== See also ==
- Sana'a history
- Timeline of Yemeni history
- Timelines of other cities in Yemen: Aden

== Bibliography ==
Published in 18th–19th centuries

- Carsten Niebuhr (1792). "Of the City of Sana". Travels through Arabia. Rare books reprints; 1. Translated by Robert Heron. Edinburgh: R. Morison and Son. hdl:2027/inu.39000003114886 – via HathiTrust.
- R.L. Playfair (1859). "Sanaa". History of Arabia Felix or Yemen. Selections from the Records of the Bombay government; no.XLIX. New series. Bombay. hdl:2027/mdp.39015039640357.
- Edward Balfour (1885), "Sana", Cyclopaedia of India (3rd ed.), London: B. Quaritch, hdl:2027/mdp.39015068611022

Published in 20th century

- Wahab, Robert Alexander (1910). "Sana" . Encyclopædia Britannica. Vol. 24 (11th ed.). pp. 125–126.
- British Admiralty (1916). "Yemen: Districts and Towns: San'a". Handbook of Arabia. Vol. 1. London: British War Office. hdl:2027/njp.32101006882755.
- R. Strothmann (1936). "Sana". Encyclopædia of Islam. Leiden: E.J. Brill. p. 143+. ISBN 9789004097933.
- R.B. Serjeant and R. Lewcock, eds., San'a: An Arabian-Islamic City (London: World of Islam Festival Trust, 1983).
- R. Lewcock, The Old Walled City of San'a (Paris: UNESCO, 1986)
- "Modernization of an Islamic City: the Case of Sanaa". Middle East City: Ancient Traditions Confront a Modern World. New York: Paragon. 1987.
- H. Kopp & E. Wirth (1994), Sana'a: Développement et Organisation de l'Espace d'une Ville Arabe, Cahiers de l'Institut de Recherches et d'Etudes sur le Monde Arabe et Musulman (in French), CNRS-Universites d'Aix Marseilles
- G. Grandguillaume; et al., eds. (1995), Sanaa hors les Murs: Une Ville Arabe Contemporaine, Collection Villes du Monde Arabe (in French), Tours: URBAMA
- Paul Bonnenfant, ed. (1995), Sanaa: Architecture Domestique et Société (in French), Paris: CNRS Editions
- Noelle Watson, ed. (1996). "San'a". International Dictionary of Historic Places: Middle East and Africa. UK: Routledge. pp. 629+. ISBN 1884964036.

Published in 21st century

- Michele Lamprakos (2005). "Rethinking Cultural Heritage: Lessons from Sana'a, Yemen". Traditional Dwellings and Settlements Review. 16 (2). International Association for the Study of Traditional Environments: 17–37. JSTOR 41747744 – via University of California, Berkeley.
- C. Edmund Bosworth, ed. (2007). "Sanaa". Historic Cities of the Islamic World. Leiden: Koninklijke Brill. p. 463+. ISBN 978-9004153882.
- Inventory of the historic city of Sana'a: a tool for urban conservation, UNESCO, 2008
- Salma K. Jayyusi; et al., eds. (2008). "Sana'a". The City in the Islamic World. Leiden: Koninklijke Brill. pp. 615–624. ISBN 9789004162402.
- Bruce E. Stanley; Michael R.T. Dumper, eds. (2008), "Sanaa", Cities of the Middle East and North Africa, Santa Barbara, USA: ABC-CLIO, p. 329+, ISBN 9781576079195
- Franck Mermier (2012). "Suqs of Sanaa: changing functions and symbolic centrality". In Mohammad Gharipour (ed.). The Bazaar in the Islamic City: Design, Culture, and History. American University in Cairo Press. ISBN 978-1-61797-346-8.
