= Timeline of Aden =

For more details, search "Aden" [city]

Historical affiliations

Kingdom of Awsan
Himyarite Kingdom
Kingdom of Aksum
Sasanian Yemen
First Islamic state
Rashidun Caliphate
Umayyad Caliphate
Abbasid Caliphate
Ziyadid dynasty
Najahid dynasty
Sulayhid dynasty
Zurayids
Ayyubid dynasty
Rasulid dynasty
Tahirid Sultanate
Mamluk Sultanate
Portuguese Aden
Yemen Eyalet
Qasimid State
Yemen Vilayet
Qasimid State
Sultanate of Lahej 1728–1839
(British Raj) Aden Province 1839–1937
Aden Colony 1937–1963
(British Empire) Aden protectorate 1937–1963
State of Aden within the FSA 1963–1967
South Yemen 1967–1990
Republic of Yemen 1990–present

The following is a timeline of the history of the city of Aden, Yemen.

== Prior to 19th century ==
- 8th century BC – The emergence of the Kingdom of Awsan in Aden.
- 6th century BC – The Qataban-Sabai alliance Awsan falls in Aden.
- 110 BCE – Himyarites overthrow the Kingdom of Saba and Qataban and take control of Aden
- 632 – Rashidun Caliphate Islam entered Yemen in the year 6AH
- 661 – Umayyad Caliphate
- 750 – Abbasids in power (approximate date).
- 819 – Banu Ziyad becomes independent from the Abbasid state
- 1021 – Banu Ma'an They are independent from the Ziadian state
- 1067 – Banū Zuraiʿ Rulers of Aden.
- 1173 – Ayyubids in power.
- 1229 – Rasulids in power.
- 1330 – Moroccan traveller Ibn Battuta visits Aden (approximate date).
- 1420s – Chinese explorer Zheng He visits Aden (approximate date).
- 1454 – Tahirids in power.
- 1500 – Aqueduct built from Bir Mahait (approximate date).
- 1511 – Italian traveller Varthema visits Aden.
- 1513 – Aden "unsuccessfully attacked by the Portuguese under Albuquerque."
- 1538 – Aden taken by Ottoman forces of Hadım Suleiman Pasha.
- 1630 – Ottomans ousted.
- 1735 – Sultan of Lahej in power.

== 19th century ==
- 1839
  - January: Aden occupied by British forces.
  - November: Abdali anti-British unrest; crackdown.
  - British colonial postal mail begins operating.
- 1840
  - May: Abdali anti-British unrest; crackdown.
  - June: Sultan of Lahej Shaykh Muhsin ibn Fadl signs treaty with British.
- 1850 – Aden becomes a free port.
- 1852 – Catholic church built.
- 1858 – Grand Synagogue of Aden built.
- 1867 – Aqueduct built.
- 1868 – Jebel Ihsan peninsula and nearby Sirah island sold by Sultan of Lahej to British.
- 1869 – Suez Canal opens in Egypt, affecting Aden as a port.
- 1871 – Protestant church built.
- 1876 – "Settlement committee" (local government) established.
- 1880 – August: French poet Rimbaud visits Aden.
- 1882 – Sheikh Othman bought by British.
- 1889 – "Port trust" (local government) established.
- 1890 – Big Ben Aden clocktower built.

== 20th century ==
=== 1900s-1950s ===
- 1915
  - Lahej-Aden railway construction begins.
  - Population: 36,900 town.
- 1917 – British Royal Air Force Khormaksar station established.
- 1924 – Sukkat Shalom synagogue established.
- 1925 – Arab Literary Club formed.
- 1929 – Arab Reform Club active.
- 1937 – 1 April: City becomes capital of the British Colony of Aden.
- 1946 – Population: 56,849.
- 1947
  - Legislative Council established.
  - December: 1947 Aden riots against Jews.
- 1951 – Aden Women's Club formed.
- 1954
  - BP refinery built in Little Aden.
  - 27 April: British queen visits Aden.
- 1955 – Aden Legislative Council election, 1955 held.
- 1956 – General Labour Union established.
- 1958 – Al-Ayyam newspaper begins publication.
- 1959 – January: Legislative council election held.

=== 1960s-1990s ===
- 1963 – January: Aden becomes part of the Federation of South Arabia.
- 1964 – 16 October: Aden Legislative Council election, 1964 held.
- 1966 – National Museum of Aden established.
- 1967
  - January: Front for the Liberation of Occupied South Yemen-National Liberation Front conflict.
  - June: Suez Canal closes, affecting port of Aden.
  - 29 November: Aden becomes capital of People's Republic of South Yemen; British forces depart.
- 1968 – Ar-Rabi Ashar Min Uktubar newspaper begins publication.
- 1970 – Aden becomes part of the Peoples Democratic Republic of Yemen.
- 1971 – Aden Military Museum established.
- 1972 – Ittihad al-Udaba (writers' guild) established.
- 1973 – Population: 264,326.
- 1975
  - Suez Canal reopens, affecting port of Aden.
  - University of Aden established.
- 1985 – Aden Airport new terminal built.
- 1986 – January: South Yemen Civil War.
- 1990 – City becomes part of the newly formed Republic of Yemen.
- 1991 – Rimbaud House opens.
- 1992
  - General Hospital built.
  - 29 December: 1992 Yemen hotel bombings.
- 1994
  - 1994 civil war in Yemen.
  - Population: 564,335 governorate.
- 1996 – University of Aden museum established.
- 1997 – 27 April: Yemeni parliamentary election, 1997 held.
- 2000 – 12 October: USS Cole bombing.

== 21st century ==
- 2009 – Population: 684,322.
- 2012 – Population: 760,923.
- 2015
  - 19 March: Battle of Aden Airport.
  - 25 March: Battle of Aden begins.

== See also ==
- Aden history
- Timeline of Yemeni history
- List of British representatives at Aden, 1839-1967
- Timelines of other cities in Yemen: Sana'a

== Bibliography ==
Published in 19th century

- William Milburn (1813), "Aden", Oriental Commerce: containing a geographical description of the principal places in the East Indies, China, and Japan, London: Black, Parry & Co., hdl:2027/uc2.ark:/13960/t1hh6sn82, OCLC 6856418
- John Macgregor (1844). "Aden". Commercial Statistics. London: C. Knight and Co.
- James Horsburgh (1852). "Arabia, South Coast: Aden Bay and Aden Harbor". India Directory: Or, Directions for Sailing to and from the East Indies, China, Australia, and the Interjacent Ports of Africa and South America (6th ed.). London: William H. Allen & Co. – via Google Books.
- R.L. Playfair (1859). "Aden". History of Arabia Felix or Yemen. Selections from the Records of the Bombay government; no.XLIX. New series. Bombay. hdl:2027/mdp.39015039640357.
- William Perry Fogg (1875), "Aden", Arabistan, Hartford, USA: Dustin, Gilman & Co.
- N. Elias, ed. (1876). Precis of Papers in the Foreign Dept. of the Government of India Regarding Aden, 1838-1872. Simla: Government Central Branch Press.
- F. M. Hunter (1877), An account of the British settlement of Aden in Arabia, London: Trübner, OCLC 1088546, OL 6905358M
- Edward Balfour (1885), "Aden", Cyclopaedia of India (3rd ed.), London: B. Quaritch, hdl:2027/mdp.39015068610990
- "Aden", Handbook for Travellers in India and Ceylon, London: J. Murray, 1892

Published in 20th century

- Marco Polo; Henry Yule (1903), "(Aden)", Book of Ser Marco Polo, the Venetian Concerning the Kingdoms and Marvels of the East, vol. 2 (3rd ed.), London: John Murray
- "Aden". Imperial Gazetteer of India. Vol. 5. Oxford: Clarendon Press. 1908. hdl:2027/yale.39002030832670.
- Frederick Mercer Hunter; Charles William Henry Sealey (1909). An Account of the Arab Tribes in the Vicinity of Aden.
- "Aden" . Encyclopædia Britannica. Vol. 1 (11th ed.). 1910. p. 190.
- "Aden". Encyclopædia of Islam. Leiden: E.J. Brill. 1913. p. 131. ISBN 9004082654.
- British Admiralty (1916). "Aden and Hadhramaut: Districts and Towns: Aden Town". Handbook of Arabia. Vol. 1. London: British War Office. hdl:2027/njp.32101006882755.
- United States Navy (1943). "Aden". Sailing Directions for the Red Sea and the Gulf of Aden. H.O.; no. 157. Washington DC: Government Printing Office. hdl:2027/uc1.31822033787326 – via HathiTrust. (fulltext)
- Garston, J. "Aden: The First Hundred Years," History Today (Mar 1965) 15#3 pp 147–158. covers 1839 to 1939.
- Gavin, R.J. Aden Under British Rule: 1839–1967 (C. Hurst & Co. 1975).
- Z. H. Kour (1981). The History of Aden 1839-1872. Frank Cass. ISBN 978-1-135-78115-6.
- Roy E. Thoman (1991). "Aden". In James Stuart Olson (ed.). Historical Dictionary of European Imperialism. Greenwood. ISBN 978-0-313-26257-9.
- José-Marie Bel (1998). Aden, Mythical port of Yemen. Amyris. ISBN 978-2-7068-1360-3.
- Roy Facey (1998), Development of the Port of Aden, British-Yemeni Society, archived from the original on 2013-12-30 – via Al-Bab.com

Published in 21st century

- Walker, Jonathan. Aden Insurgency: The Savage War in South Arabia 1962–67 (Spellmount Staplehurst, 2003) ISBN 1-86227-225-5
- Mawby, Spencer. British Policy in Aden & the Protectorates, 1955-67: Last Outpost of a Middle East Empire (2005).
- Hinchcliffe, Peter, et al. Without Glory in Arabia: The British Retreat from Aden (2006).
- Roxani Eleni Margariti (2006). "Aden". In Josef W. Meri (ed.). Medieval Islamic Civilization. Routledge. p. 14+. ISBN 978-0-415-96691-7.
- Roxani Eleni Margariti (2007), Aden and the Indian Ocean Trade: 150 Years in the Life of a Medieval Arabian Port, University of North Carolina Press, ISBN 9780807830765
- Bruce E. Stanley; Michael R.T. Dumper, eds. (2008), "Aden", Cities of the Middle East and North Africa, Santa Barbara, USA: ABC-CLIO, p. 8+, ISBN 9781576079195
- Mawby, Spencer. "Orientalism and the failure of British policy in the Middle East: The case of Aden." History 95.319 (2010): 332–353. online
- "Yemen's Despair on Full Display in 'Ruined' City", New York Times, 10 April 2015
- Scott Steven Reese. Imperial Muslims: Islam, Community and Authority in the Indian Ocean, 1839-1937. (A history of Aden) Edinburgh Edinburgh University Press, 2017. ix + 212 pp. ISBN 978-0-7486-9765-6.
- Edwards, Aaron. "A triumph of realism? Britain, Aden and the end of empire, 1964–67." Middle Eastern Studies 53.1 (2017): 6-18.
