= Dar al-Shukr =

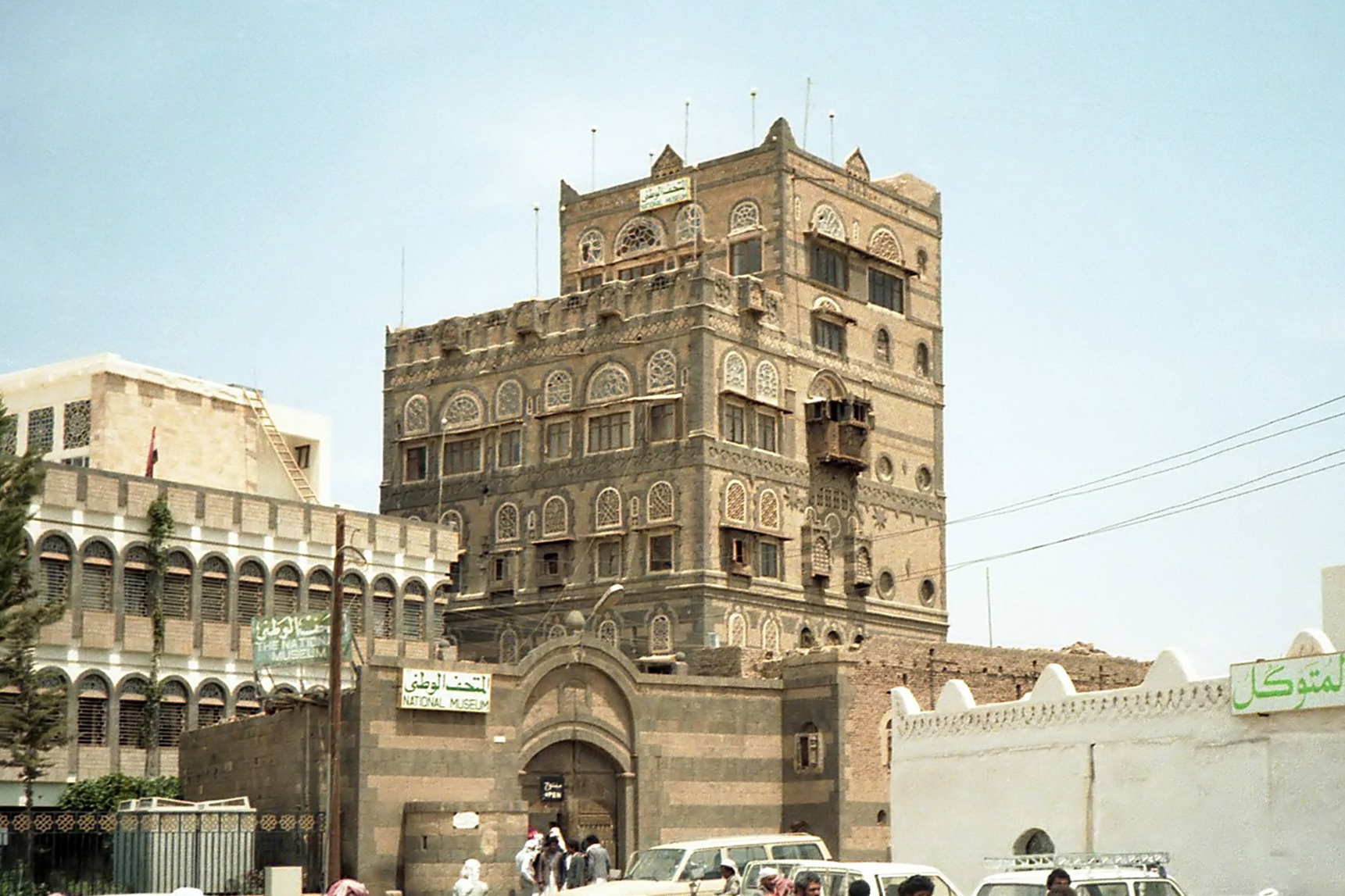
Dar al-Shukr palace in Sana'a (1986)

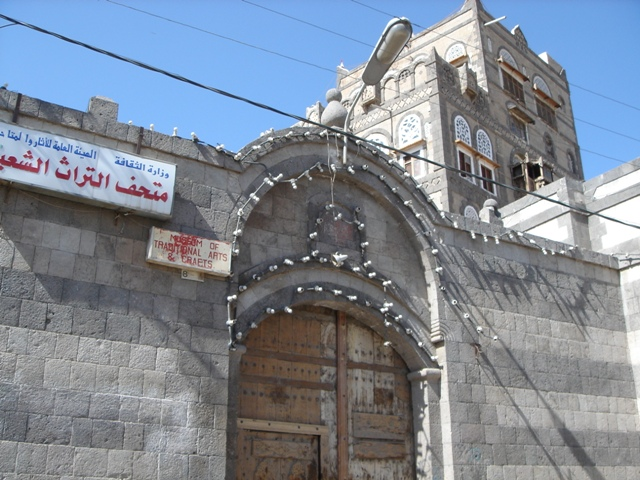
Main gate to the palace (2007)

Dar al-Shukr (Arabic: دار الشكر; lit. 'House of Gratefulness') is a royal palace located in Sana'a, Yemen. It is located near Qubbat al-Mutawakkil Mosque dome in Tahrir Square in the city centre.

After the fall of the monarchy in the 1960s, it housed the National Museum of Yemen. After that it houses the Museum of Traditional Arts and Crafts.

== See also ==
- Dar al-Bashair
- Dar al-Hajar
- Dar as-Sa'd
