= Arwa Othman =

Yemeni writer, journalist and human rights activist (born 1965)

- أروى عثمان
- Born: November 22, 1965 (age 59); Taiz, Yemen Arab Republic (now Yemen)
- Years active: 1985–present
- Known for: activism, journalism
- Children: 3

Arwa Othman (Arabic: أروى عبده عثمان) is a Yemeni writer, journalist, human rights activist and former Minister of Culture (2014 – 2015) in the Bahah Cabinet of President Abdrabbuh Mansur Hadi. Human Rights Watch has cited Othman as one of the "most outspoken activists calling for human rights and gender equality" during the 2011 Yemeni Revolution.

== Early life and education ==
Arwa Othman was born on 22 November 1965, in As-Silw District of Taiz, (North Yemen, now Yemen). She attended primary school in Taiz at Al-Thulaia School in Al-Jahmaliyah, and then at Al-Kuwait School. And she completed her secondary education at Asma School in Sala district of Taiz.

Othman grew up in an illiterate family; her father owned a shop in a local market, while her mother was a housewife. During her elementary school years, her family considered marrying her off, but her passion for learning and frequent visits to a neighbourhood library fuelled her determination to continue her education.

Despite her academic success in the secondary school, Arwa faced significant opposition from her father when she expressed a desire to pursue university studies. With the intervention of a villager and her father's personal visit to Sana'a University in the capital, she was eventually allowed to enroll. She graduated from the Department of Philosophy at the Faculty of Arts in 1989.

In an interview with Al-Araby Al-Jadeed, Othman reflected on the challenges of that time, noting the prevailing social stigmas in her village, where women's university education was often linked to scandal. She recounted that rumours circulated claiming women who attended university returned pregnant.

Arwa Othman has frequently faced accusations of blasphemy due to her opinions, writings, and public positions. In response, she has firmly stated that she is a Muslim who believes in God and His Messenger, rejecting the label of infidel.

Othman has spoken about the personal toll these accusations have taken on her and her family. She revealed that the defamatory talk has reached her family, including her daughters, and even intruded into her personal life. Reflecting on her past, she recounted that during her university days, she and her peers were subjected to interrogations, and in her neighborhood, children were encouraged to throw stones at her while being told to “Stone the devil.”

Othman expressed her pain at how these campaigns have affected her daughters. She has often reminded them that she and her female friends endured similar abuse for a long time due to their opinions and beliefs. She shared the story of one of her friends from that time who, unable to withstand the harassment, chose to settle in Britain and has refused to return to Yemen.

Arwa Othman is married to Mansour Hayel, a socialist leader. She is the mother of three daughters, Hind, Mai and Mary.

== Early career ==
Arwa Othman began writing sharp and bold articles under pseudonyms between in the mid 1980s, laying the foundation for her later career as a writer and intellectual. She became known in the mid-1990s as a writer advocating for respect for diversity and differences and celebration of social cultural diversity. She has become widely recognised by her satirical criticism due to her use of various forms of Yemeni popular and folklore culture.

In a challenging patriarchal society for women in Yemen, Othman also became known for her decision to remove her hijab, a choice uncommon in her cultural context. This decision led to various personal and societal challenges. Othman has consistently emphasised the importance of respecting women's personal choices regarding their appearances and autonomy.

Othman's passion for heritage began at a young age. In 1997, she started collecting traditional artefacts in a popular area known as AsSameel market in Taiz, a place under threat of cultural erosion. With prize money she received after winning the Sharjah Award for Arabic Excellence in 2000 for her short story collection “It Happened in a Tinka Land of Mosquitoes,” she established a small museum,. This museum, which later became the House of Folklore, officially opened in 2004 and lasted until 2010. It operated until 2010 when Othman faced insurmountable difficulties maintaining it. She stated that the closure was due to the demolition of the rented premises, which forced her to relocate the collection multiple times. During these moves, many rare artefacts were lost or looted.

== During the Arab Spring (2011) ==
Arwa Othman was one of the prominent participants in the Yemeni revolution 2011 at Change Square in Sana'a. During this period, she also began working as a professional photographer. Due to her strong civil stances, she faced abuse from both religious extremists and individuals in positions of power, who used their platforms and media outlets to target her.

On April 16, 2011, Othman and 11 other female activists and human rights defenders were violently attacked during a demonstration. They were protesting President Saleh's call for female protesters in Yemeni cities to refrain from mixing with male demonstrators. The attack, carried out by members of the Security Committee of the Youth of the Revolution, its organising committee, and members of the First Armoured Division—groups that supported the revolution—involved severe beatings with hands, feet, and rifle butts.

Othman participated in several cultural activities during the 2011 uprising, including mixed-gender dance events in the Change Square. These activities drew significant criticism from conservative groups such as the Al-Islah party, she was among a group of women activists who filed a lawsuit against one of its leaders, Hamid al-Ahmar in response to his controversial remarks about women's participation in the revolution. In an interview with a New York Times reporter, al-Ahmar stated that “there was bad behaviour that turned the square into a place for dancing,” further accusing the women of attending demonstrations “hand in hand with their male friends and lovers.” He characterised such actions as “inappropriate and against our religion.”

== Career ==
Arwa Othman has headed the House of Folklore in Sana'a. In 2013 she was appointed to the Yemeni National Dialogue Conference, where she headed the Rights and Freedom Committee. Under her the committee recommended reforms for improving the lives of Yemeni women, making 18 the minimum age for marriage and action against people involved in the forced marriage of a child. In September 2013 she highlighted the case of an eight year old child bride who died of internal bleeding. However, Othman's advocacy also brought her to the notice of orthodox sections of society, from whom she received death threats.

Othman was one of the recipients of Human Rights Watch (HRW)'s Alison Des Forges Award for Extraordinary Activism in 2014. She was honoured for her activism against child marriage and advocacy for gender equality. She dedicated her award to the Jewish community residing in Yemen, her "brothers and friends from the Jewish community".

In November 2014 Abdrabbuh Mansur Hadi appointed Arwa Othman to the cabinet as Minister of Culture. The cabinet was dissolved in January 2015.

After her appointment as Minister of Culture in 2014, Arwa Othman faced attacks from fundamentalist groups who launched a systematic campaign of defamation and slander against her. The backlash stemmed in part from her public dancing during the commemoration of the 26 September Revolution in 2014, an event held five days after the fall of Sana'a to Houthi rebels.

Houthi movement activists intensified the campaign against Othman, using social media to criticise her and publishing her photo on the cover of a newspaper affiliated with their group, accompanied by a sarcastic comment. In response, Othman reposted a photo of herself dancing on her personal Facebook page with the caption: “We dance... to live.” Her bold statement was widely shared and embraced by anti-Houthi activists as a message of defiance.

In 2017 she was among signatories condemning a wave of arrests of followers of the Baháʼí Faith in Yemen.

== See also ==
- Tawakkol Karman
- Yemeni Revolution
