= 1959 Aden Legislative Council election =

Elections to the Legislative Council were held in the Colony of Aden on 4 January 1959.

== Background ==
In the previous elections in 1955 only four of the Legislative Council's 18 seats were elected. This was raised to 12 elected seats on an enlarged Legislative Council of 23 members. The colony was divided into five constituencies, each electing two or three members. Restrictions on suffrage led to only 21,500 people being registered to vote from a population of 180,000. Of the remaining 11 members of the Council, five were ex officio and six were nominees. Five of the members (at least three of which had to be elected member) would be appointed "Members in charge" by the Governor, and would have responsibility for government departments.

A total of 31 candidates contested the election, with between five and seven in each constituency.

== Results ==
Of the 12 elected members, nine were Arabs, two were Somalis and one was Indian. All were described as "aging, pro-British and moneyed".

Only 6,000 votes were cast, following calls for a boycott by the Aden Trade Union Congress, with voter turnout at just 27%. Turnout varied from 43% in Crater to 15% in Sheikh Othman–Little Aden.

=== Elected members ===
The winning candidates were all independents, and received between 902 and 207 votes:

- Saidi (902 votes)
- Kudabax Khan (854 votes)
- Bayoumi (704 votes)
- Salole (663 votes)
- Ali Lukman (637 votes)
- Saidi Hussain (580 votes)
- Abdullah Binswalla (567 votes)
- K Joshi (543 votes)
- Ali Awan Moulhi (521 votes)
- Maktari (440 votes)
- Husaini (368 votes)
- Mustaffa Abdullah (207 votes)

== Aftermath ==
Despite the pro-British nature of the elected members, the Legislative Council only narrowly approved joining the Federation of South Arabia.
