= Dar as-Sa'd =

Former royal palace in Sana'a, Yemen

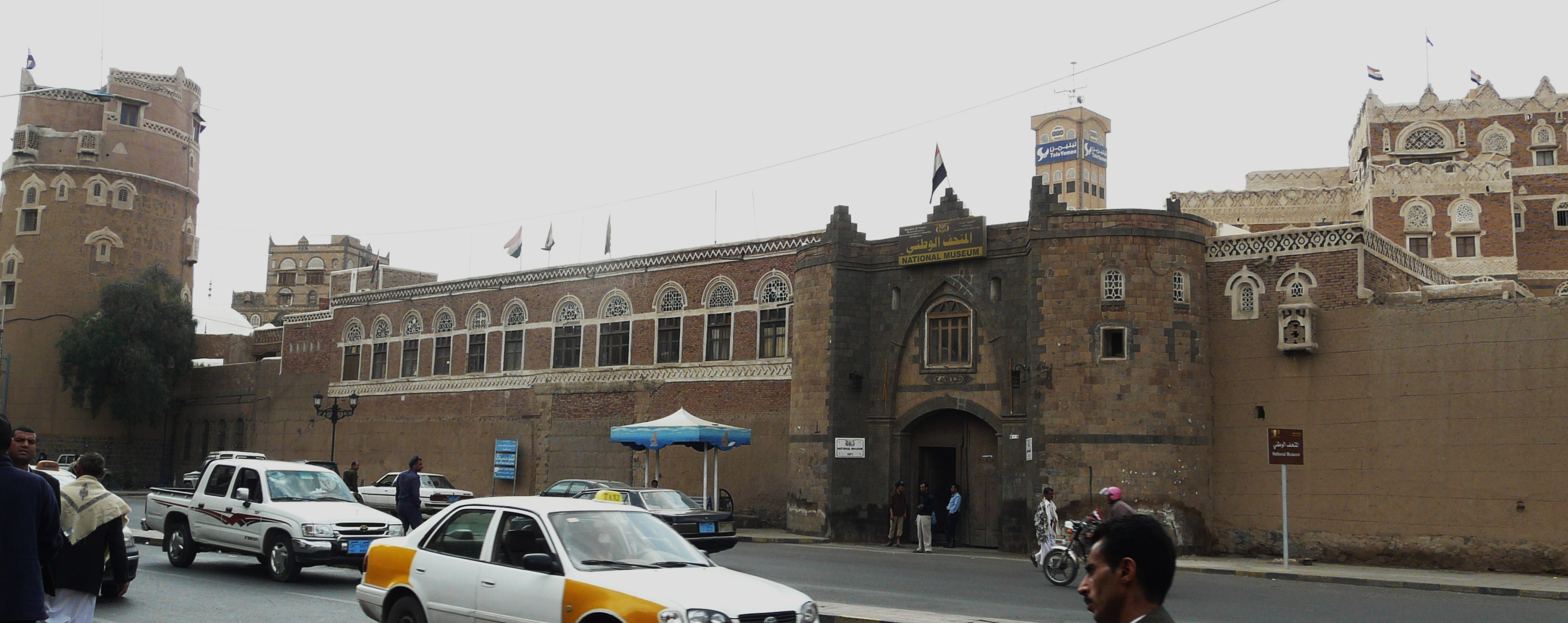
Dar as-Sa'd palace in Sana'a (2010)

Dar as-Sa'd (Arabic: دار السعد) or Dar as-Sa’ada (Arabic: دار السعاده), all of which mean "House of Happiness", is a royal palace located in Sana'a, Yemen. It is located near Qubbat al-Mutawakkil Mosque dome in Tahrir Square in the city centre, and currently houses the National Museum of Yemen.

== See also ==
- Dar al-Bashair
- Dar al-Hajar
- Dar al-Shukr
