= National Library of Yemen =

- المكتبة الوطنية اليمنية
- 15°21′3″N 44°12′9″E
- Location: Sana'a, Yemen
- Type: National library

Collection
- Legal deposit: Yes

The National Library of Yemen (Arabic: المكتبة الوطنية اليمنية) is the national and depository library of Yemen, located in central Sana'a. As such, this institution is responsible for protection of important collections of literary, historical, cultural and intellectual heritage of Yemen.

The library is located near the Al-Tahrir Square and the Yemen Military Museum. Yemen Arab Republic established the library in 1968. It has an extensive collection of books in French and in English about Yemen.

== New headquarters ==
In December 2010 it was reported that an 40-million-dollar grant agreement for the construction of a new building had been reached with China. The building was planned to be situated in the western part of Sana'a. Construction was said to commence in January 2011 and last for a maximum of 30 months. Subsequently, the project faced delays and the funding requirement increased to 50 million dollars.
