= House of Folklore =

Closed Museum in Yemen

Coordinates: 15°20′54″N 44°11′58″E

House of Folklore بيت الموروث الشعبي
- Established: 2004
- Dissolved: May 6, 2010
- Location: Sana'a, Yemen
- Type: Folklore Museum
- President: Arwa Othman
- Website: yemenifolklore.org

House of Folklore (HoF) was a museum in central Sana'a, Yemen. It was located southwest of the Tahrir Square and south of the Egyptian Embassy and north of the Chinese Embassy. Founded on 11 April 2004 under the permission of the Ministry of Culture, it was "a cultural, research, non-profit and non-governmental organization works on collecting and documenting the Yemeni Folklore". The museum closed in May 2010 due to financial difficulties.

== History ==
The museum opened in April 2004 by A Arwa Abdo Othman, the museum's director and researcher at the Yemeni Studies and Research Center. The goal of the museum was to preserve Yemeni spiritual and material folklore.

The museum was originally funded via a US$5,000 prize Othman was awarded from Sharjah Award for Arabic Excellence in 2000 in addition to selling a plot of land.

The museum was in a small, derelict building in Sana'a's old city. Items displayed in the museum included traditional Yemeni folk costumes, hats, clothing, and jewelry, in addition to a library, a traditional kitchen, and photo gallery.

In 2005, the HoF organized a Madraha Festival with the goal of recording chants, songs, and rituals associated with Hajj, in particular, the Yemeni swing game of Al Madraha which is popular in Sana'a.

In 2009, Arwa Othman appealed twice to the government of Yemen and international NGOs to request funding for the museum. Ambassadors from European Union nations visited the museum to offer political support. However, funding was not secured, and the building housing the museum went into disrepair.

On May 6th, 2010, the museum closed officially closed to the public as it was at risk of collapsing due to a lack of funds. The building was in disrepair for years, and the problem was exasperated by heavy rains. The rain also damaged much of the exhibits, including books, clothing, pictures, and various antiques.

== See also ==
- List of museums in Yemen
