= Dar al-Bashair =

Royal palace in Sana'a, Yemen

Dar al-Bashair (Arabic: دار البشائر) is a royal palace located in the Bir al-Azab district of Sana'a, Yemen.

It was the residence of King Muhammad al-Badr. On September 26, 1962, the commander of the royal guard Abdullah al-Sallal staged a coup and had the palace shelled.

== See also ==
- Dar al-Hajar
- Dar as-Sa'd
- Dar al-Shukr
