= Assassination of Harry Barrie =

1965 murder in Aden, Yemen

- Location: Aden
- Date: 29 August 1965
- Target: Harry Barrie
- Attack type: Shooting
- Deaths: 1
- Perpetrator: NLF

The assassination of Harry Barrie occurred in Aden on 29 August 1965 and involved the assassination of the Head of Police, Harry Barrie.

Barrie was driving into a lane leading to his office at the British intelligence centre in the Crater. Seven bullets hit him in the chest, right hand and leg. He died whilst he was being rushed to the nearest hospital. It was the first attack on a British police officer although in the previous eight months five Arab members of the Aden police force had been killed and six wounded.

Later that week saw the Assassination of Sir Arthur Charles.
