= List of museums in Yemen =

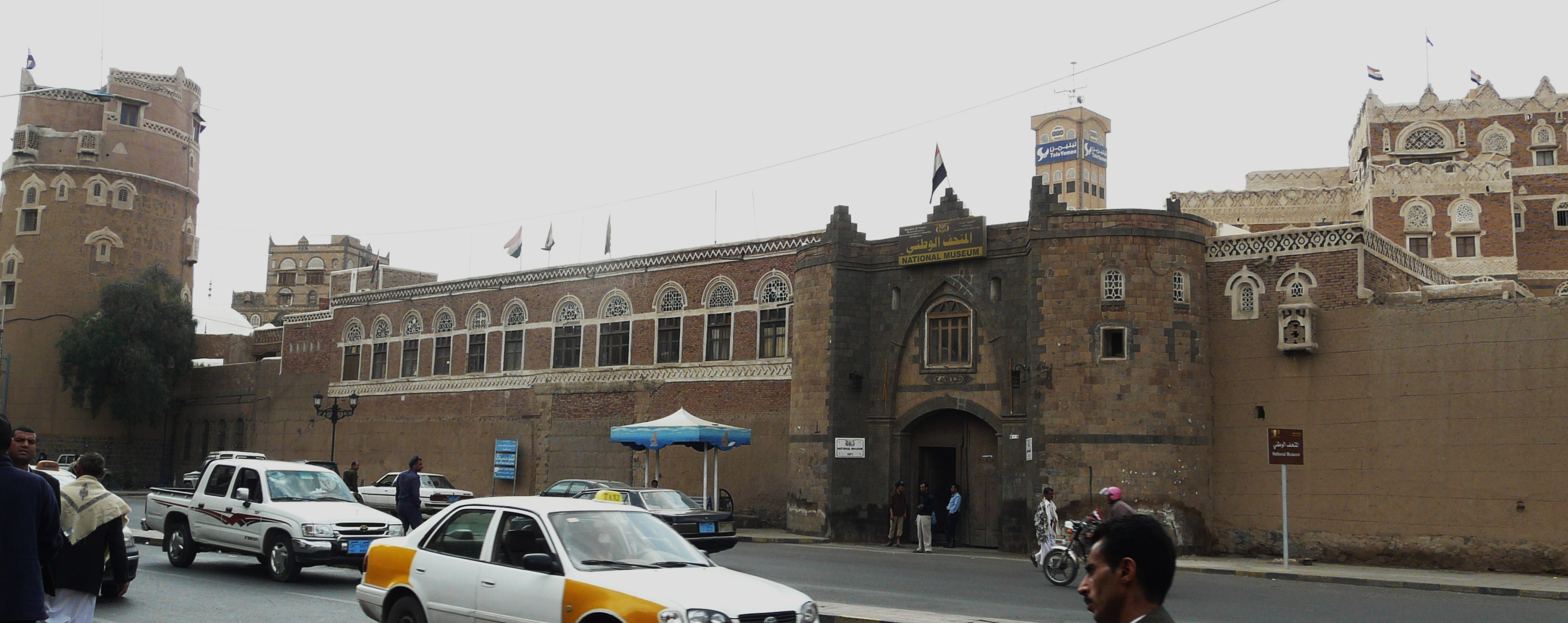
National Museum of Yemen in Sana'a established in 1971.

This is a list of museums in Yemen. Yemen's museums have been referred to as being "the richest in the Arabian peninsula", but have suffered heavy losses due to the ongoing civil war.

- National Museum of Yemen
- Yemen Military Museum
- House of Folklore
- Mukalla Museum

== See also ==
- List of museums
- Culture of Yemen
