= Assassination of Sir Arthur Charles =

- Location: Aden
- Date: 1 September 1965
- Attack type: Shooting
- Deaths: 1
- Perpetrator: NLF

Sir Arthur Charles, Speaker of the Legislative Council of Aden, was assassinated on 1 September 1965, during the Aden Emergency.

Charles was shot at least three times, reportedly by two men, as he was entering his car after playing at the Sierra Tennis Club in Crater. He was immediately taken to a hospital, but died on the operating table.

Charles had been in Aden since 1959 and was knighted in June 1965.

The assassination happened only a few days after the Assassination of Harry Barrie. None of the thirteen man Aden State Legislative Council condemned the assassination out of fear of reprisals if they did.
