= 1964 Aden Legislative Council election =

Elections to the Legislative Council for the State of Aden were held on 16 October 1964 for the majority of the seats in the Legislative Council.

== Background ==
The elections had originally been scheduled for 1962 but after being postponed, they took place amid widespread unrest; political detentions were common and public meetings were banned. The major political parties, including the People's Socialist Party (PSP), all boycotted the elections.

A total of 48 candidates contested the 16 elected seats.

== Results ==
Despite the boycott, voter turnout was 76%. A candidate who had been imprisoned as a result of the 1963 airport grenade attack against the British delegation received 98% of the vote in Crater, while 14 of the other 16 elected council members successfully demanded that he be released from prison and seated on the council. Zain Baharoon initially continued as Chief Minister, but was replaced by the PSP's Abdulqawi Makkawi in March 1965.
