= Dar al-Hajar =

Yemen royal palace

Coordinates: 15°26′28″N 44°07′30″E

- دار الحجر
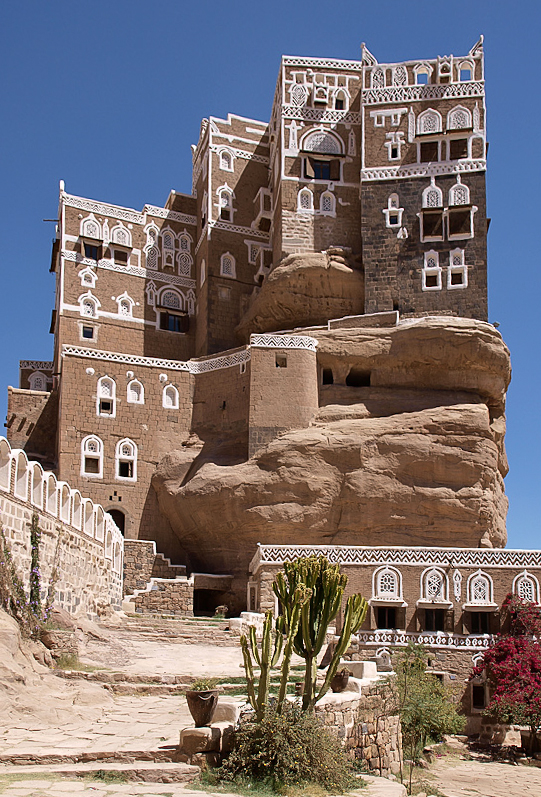
- Dar al-Hajar palace (2009)
- Interactive map of the Dar al-Hajar area

General information
- Architectural style: Yemeni architecture
- Completed: 1920

The Dar al-Hajar (Arabic: دار الحجر, "Stone House" or "Rock Palace") is a former royal palace located in Wadi Dhar about 15 kilometres (9.3 mi) from Sanaa, Yemen. Built in 1920 as the summer retreat of Yahya Muhammad Hamid ed-Din, Imam of Yemen from 1904 to 1948, it sits on top of a structure built in 1786 for the scholar al-Imam Mansour. The royal family resided in the palace until the North Yemen Civil War. The palace is currently a museum.

== History ==
The construction of the palace dates back to the late 18th century when the Imam of Yemen, Al-Mansur Ali bin Abbas, ordered his minister Ali bin Saleh Al-Amari (1736-1798), who was renowned for his expertise in architecture, astronomy, poetry, and literature, to build a summer palace for him in Wadi Dhahr. Historians narrate that it was built on the ruins of an ancient Sabaean palace known as the Fortress of Dhi Saydan, constructed by the Himyarites in 3000 B.C. The fortress was destroyed by the Turks four hundred years ago and was restored in the early 20th century by Imam Yahya Hamid al-Din after being passed down through several Yemeni Imams. It is currently a tourist attraction regularly visited by locals and foreigners. The construction remained in its initial form for years until Imam Yahya bin Hamid al-Din added the upper floor (the Mafraj).

The accounts regarding the founding and construction of Dar Al-Hajar vary. Some stories suggest that the palace was destroyed dozens of times but was always rebuilt. It is said that during their first invasion of Yemen, the Turks preferred to reside in this palace because of its unique architectural style and the valley, which, along with other surrounding sites and landscapes, forms a garden and orchard for the residents and visitors of this historical palace. These places are known for their perennial greenery, with the valley being famous for growing grapes, peaches, and quinces, in addition to the giant doum palm trees, which have begun to disappear due to the expansion of qat cultivation. It is also said that during Turkish rule, the country experienced heavy rains that led to the palace's collapse, leaving no trace of it.

Subsequently, Imam Abdullah Al-Mansur came to the area and rebuilt the three floors using black basalt stone, which is the structure that exists today. He then lived there, and after his death, Imam Al-Nasir resided in the palace. It is said that during his rule, there were some wars and conflicts between him and the people of Hamdan, who killed him while he was asleep. They took his body and buried him, along with his guards, in an area south of Wadi Dahr. The locals say that his grave still exists and is known to everyone.

After the death of Imam Al-Nasir, the imams were apprehensive about residing in this palace. Imam Yahya even built some other palaces in the valley. However, he soon changed his mind and decided to restore Dar Al-Hajar, adding several additional floors using fired bricks and incorporating other facilities such as the Mafraj, where he would receive people. The Imam also constructed a mosque adjacent to the palace and inscribed on its door "Built for God by Al-Mutawakkil ala Allah", which remains there to this day.

== Architectural style ==
The palace consists of seven floors that are designed to align with the natural formation of the rock (the foundation of the structure). At its entrance, there is an ancient talouqa tree estimated to be 700 years old. The entry to the palace is through a wide passage paved with large stones, leading to a rest area. The Mafraj is located on the northern side, overlooking a circular water basin constructed from black basalt stone.

== In popular culture ==
- In 1974, Pier Paolo Pasolini used the palace as the home of Princess Dunya in his film The Arabian Nights.

== Gallery ==
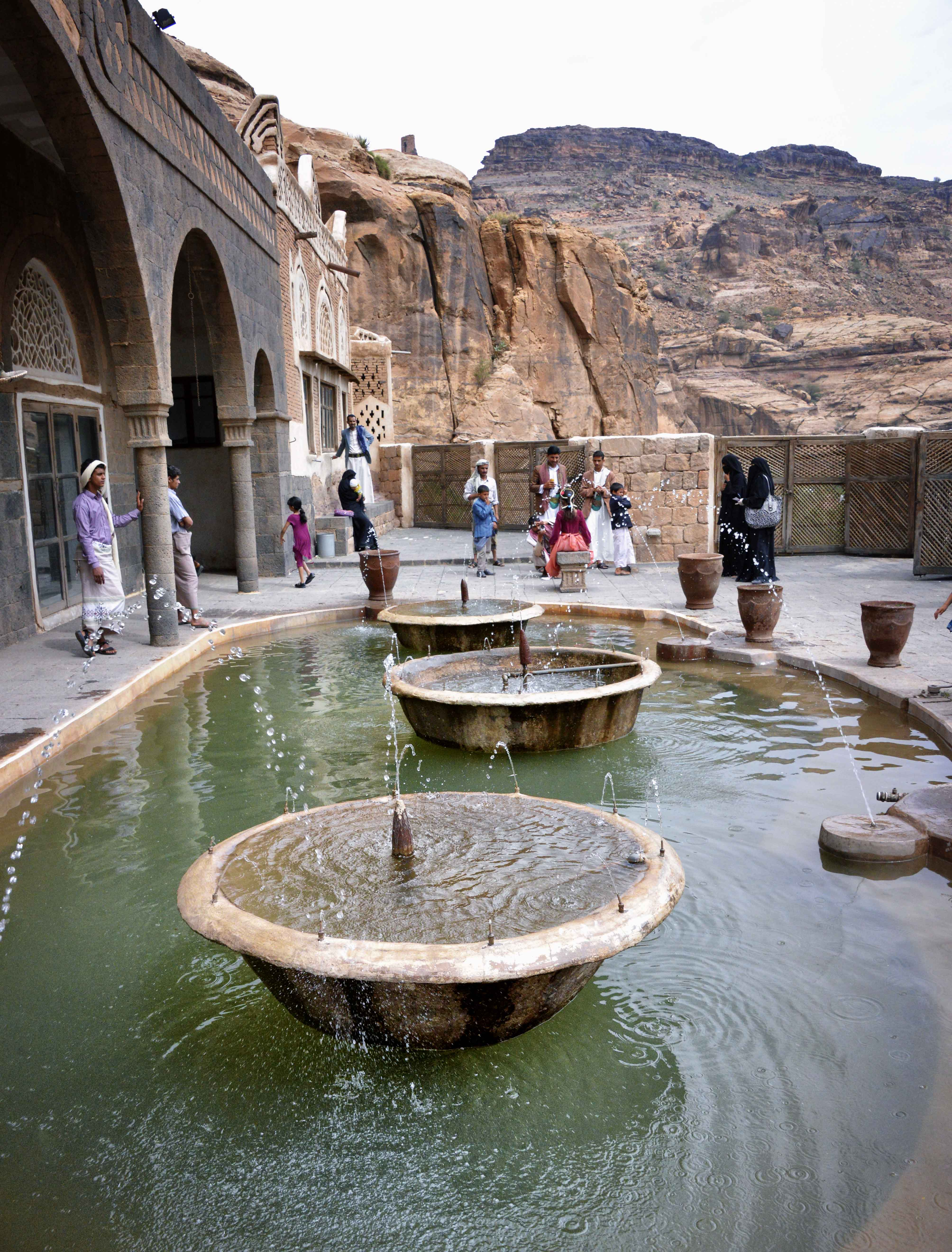

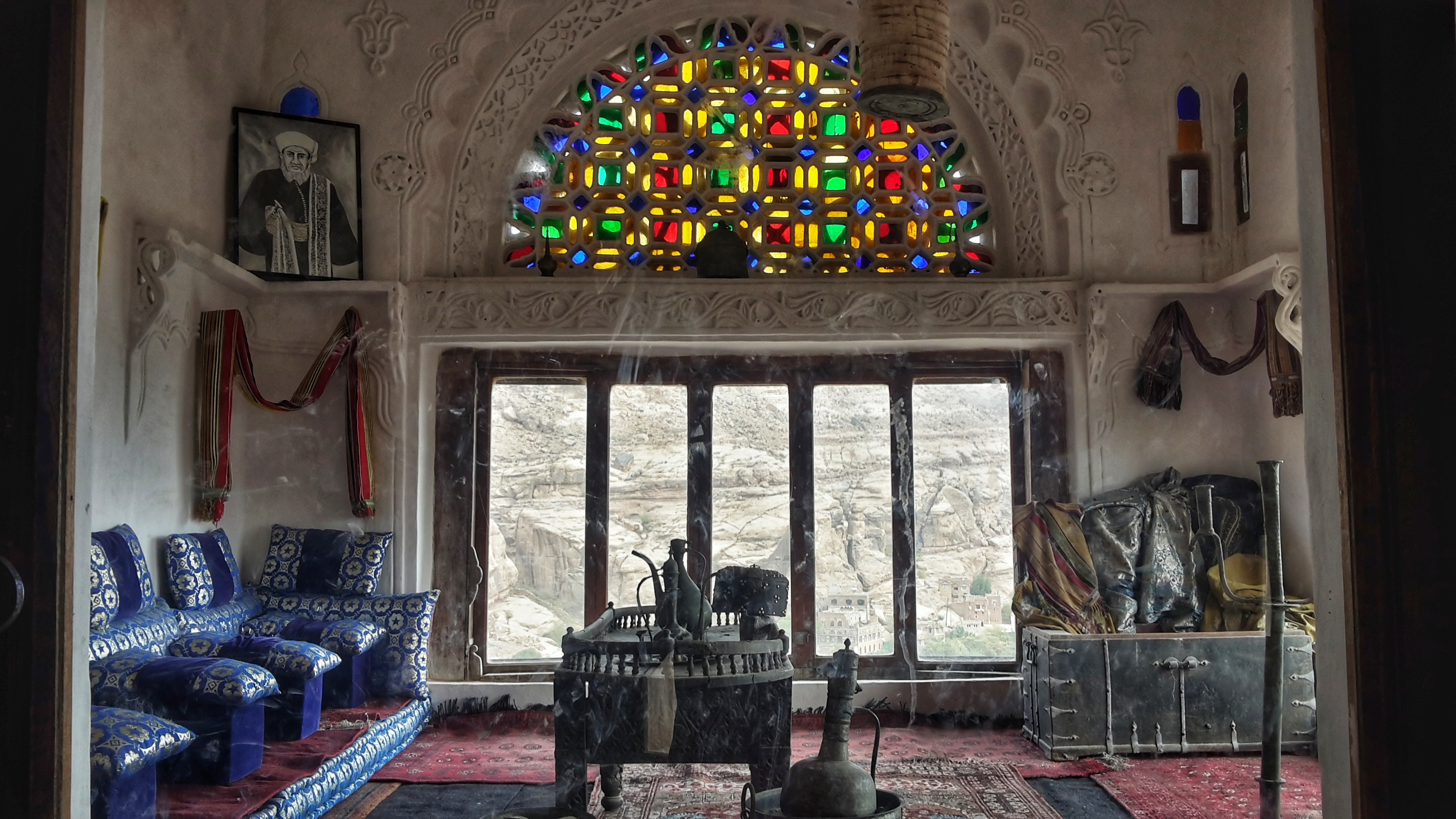

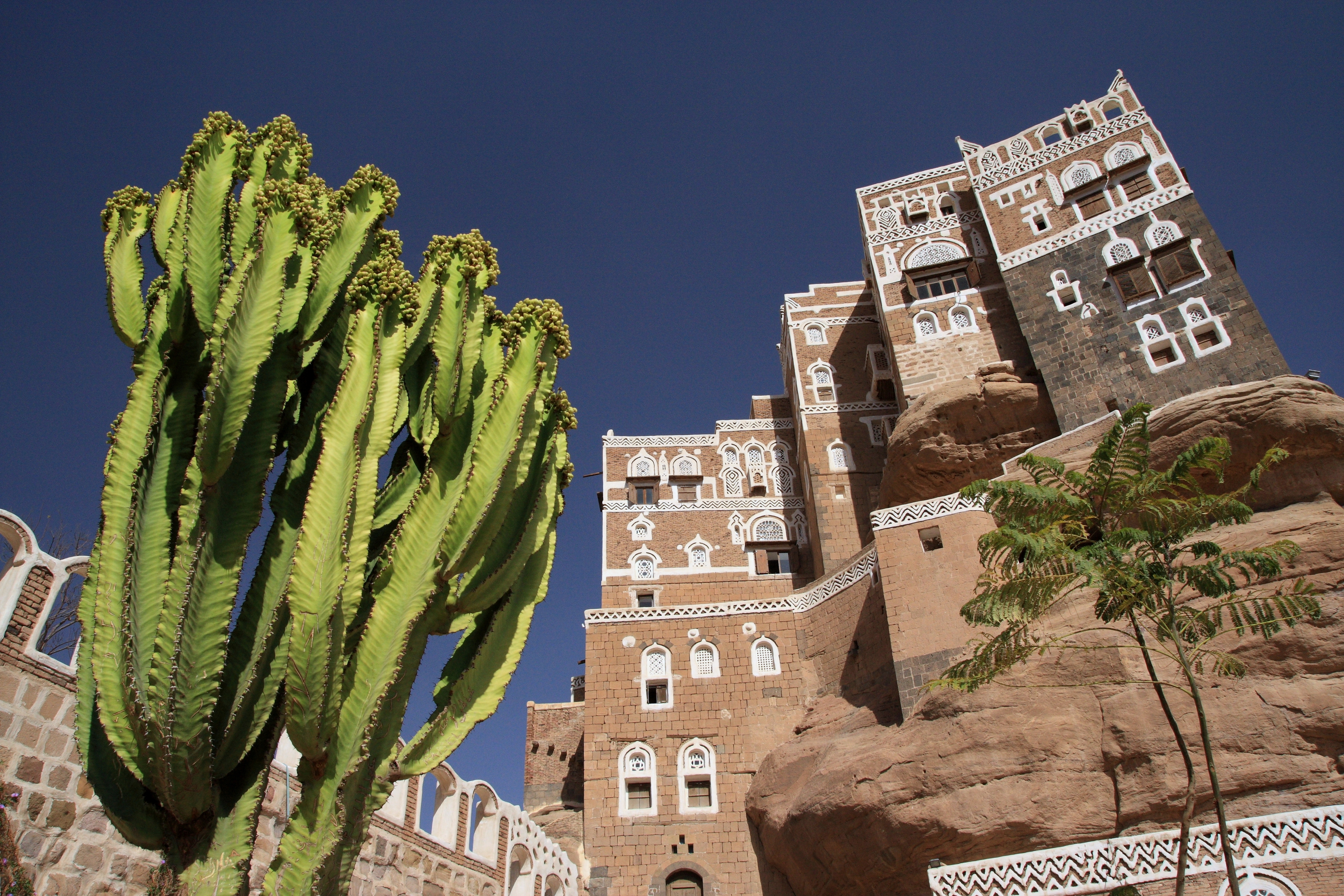

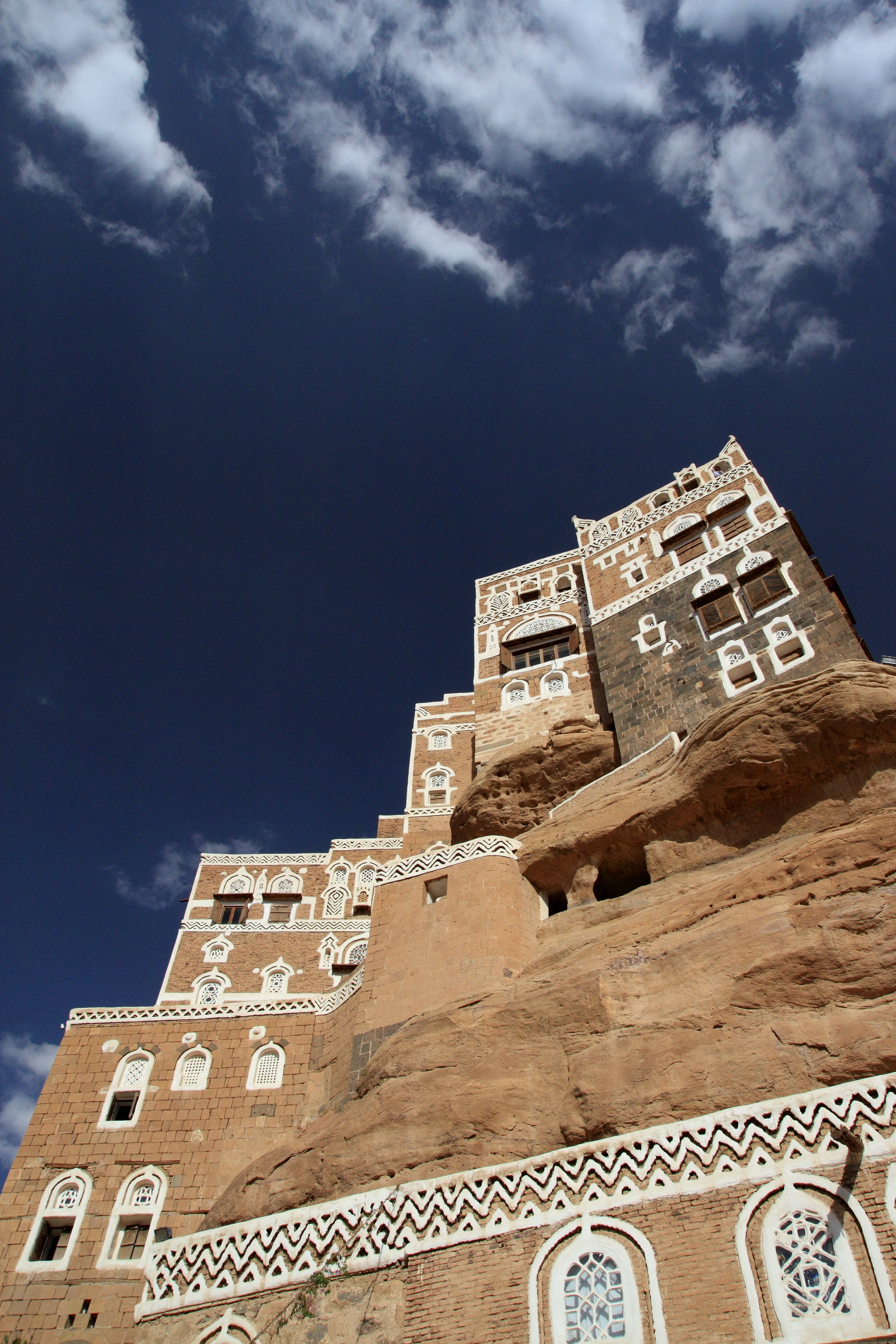

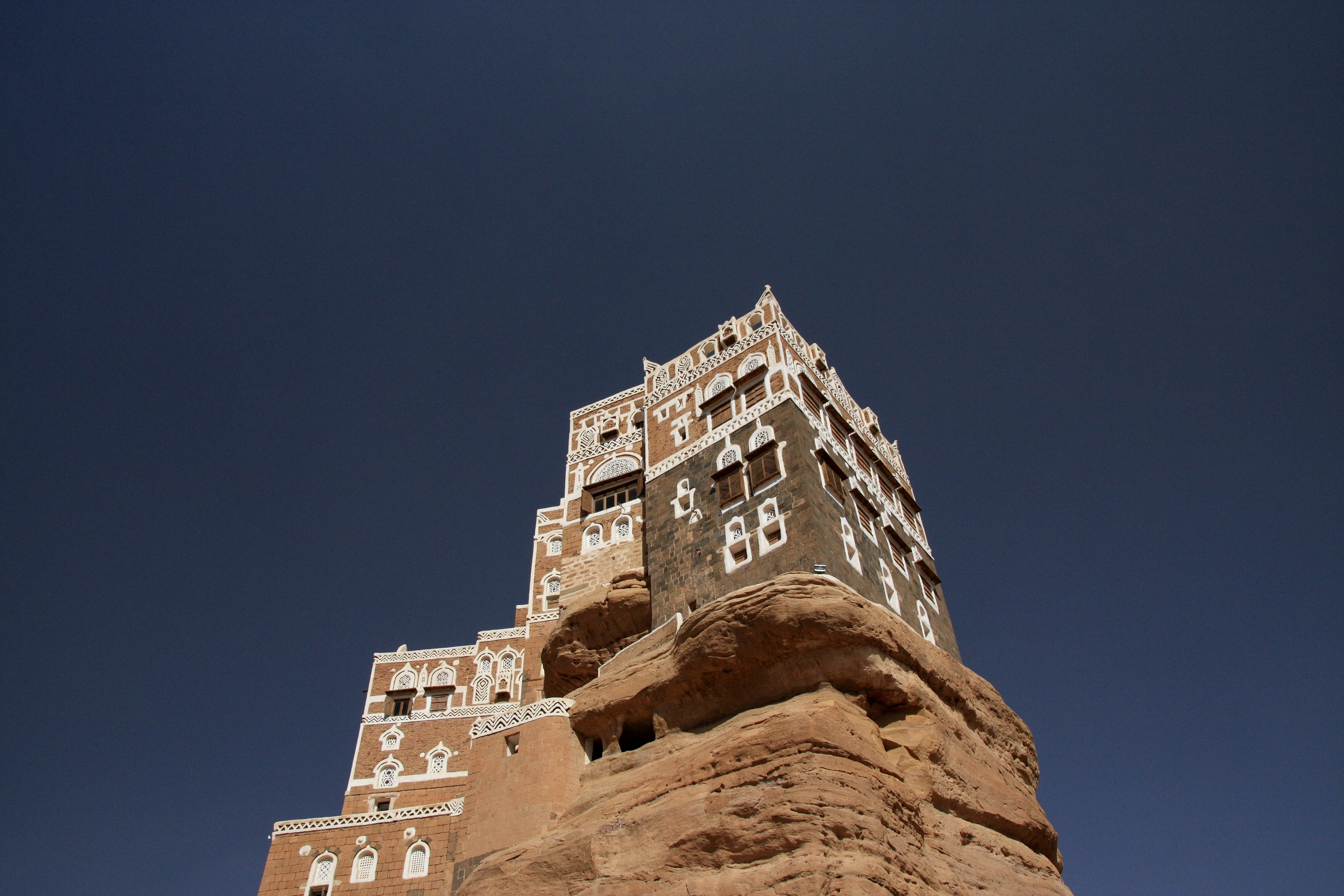

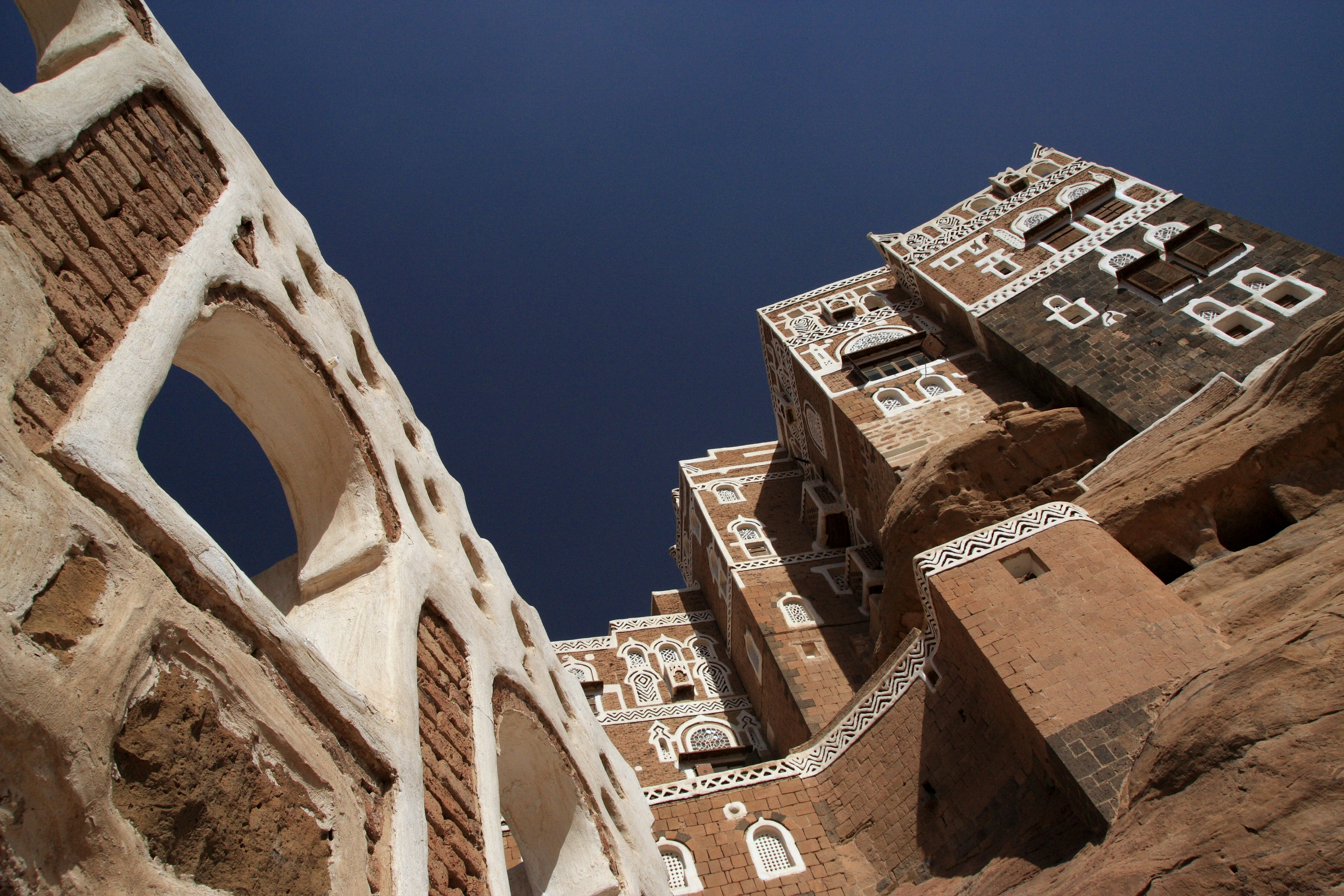

== See also ==
- Dar al-Bashair
- Dar as-Sa'd
