= National Museum of Yemen =

- المتحف الوطني اليمني
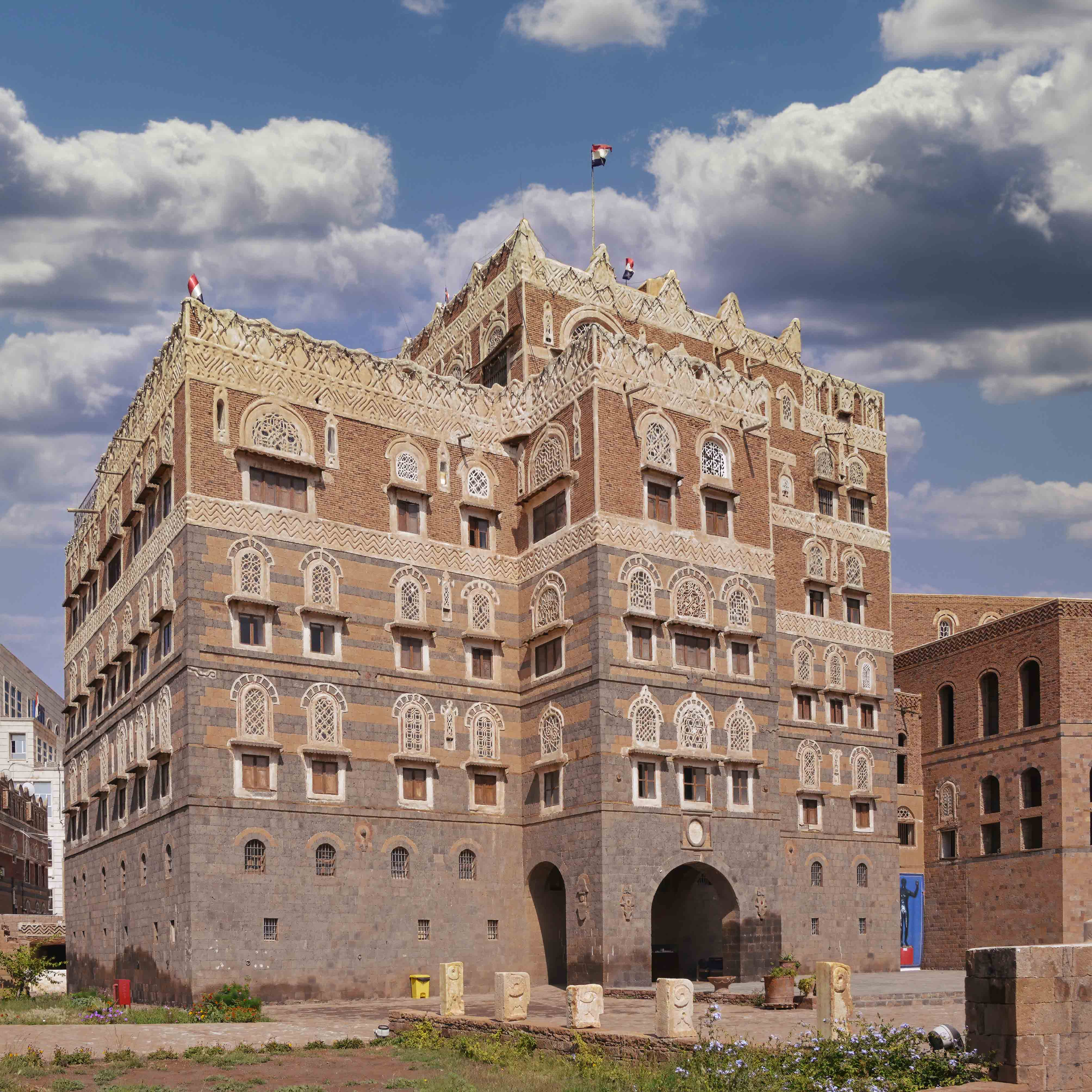
- National Museum of Yemen in Sanaa

- Location within Sanaa
- Established: February 6, 1971
- Location: Sanaa, Yemen
- Coordinates: 15.355898°N 44.206404°E
- Type: Archaeological museum, Cultural museum

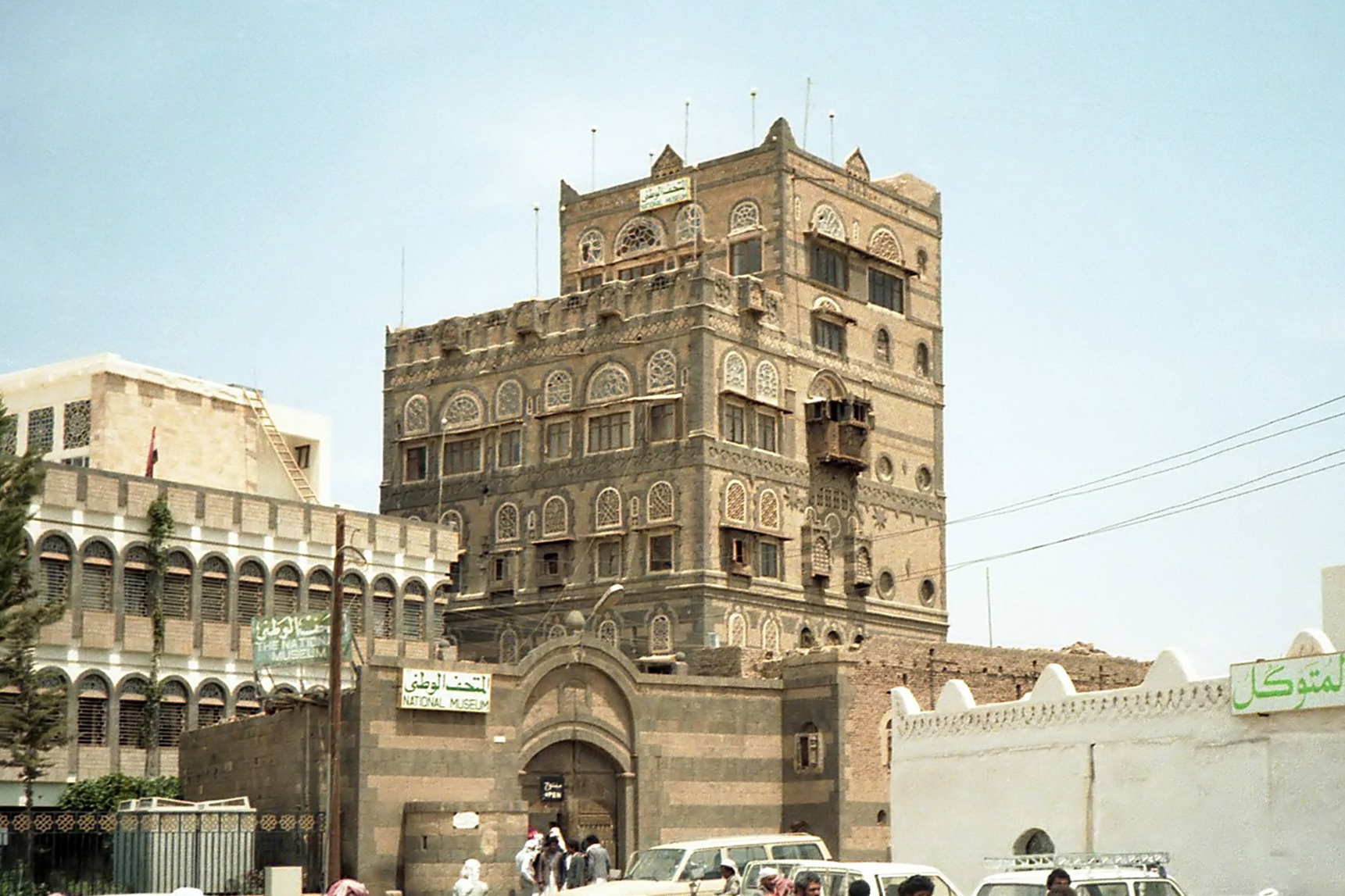
Dar al-Shukr palace, the previous place of the national museum of Yemen in Sanaa

The National Museum of Yemen (Arabic: المتحف الوطني اليمني) in Sanaa, Yemen, is an archaeological and cultural museum. It is located in Dar al-Shukr (Palace of Gratefulness) which was one of the Yemeni Imam Palaces.

The museum was founded in 1970 following a decision made a year before and opened to the public in 1971. The collections stem partly from an earlier museum established by the Imam of Yemen.

The Museum recently moved to a nearby building called Dar Al-Sada (Palace of Happiness). It is located near Qubbat al-Mutawakkil Mosque dome in Tahrir Square in the city center. The relocation was made to the newly renovated Palace because it offers the necessary space to accommodate the increasing number of artifacts throughout the history of Yemen.

The museum contains artifacts of ancient Yemen collected from different archaeological sites. The National Museum consists of the four-story building and its room has been reserved for the presentation of rare artifacts and monuments. The exhibits include the artifacts of a Yemeni Imam, artifacts from Marib, ancient Kingdoms of Yemen, and artifacts from the Islamic States era.

Dar al-Shukr was converted into the National Heritage Museum in 1991 but was not immediately open to public.

In 2007, the museum housed over 30 thousand artifacts.

The museum closed in 2011 due to the Yemeni revolution and officially re-opened 12 years later in 2023. The museum sustained damage during the September 2025 Israeli attacks in Yemen.

== Gallery ==
Sabaean Artifacts being presented in the museum:

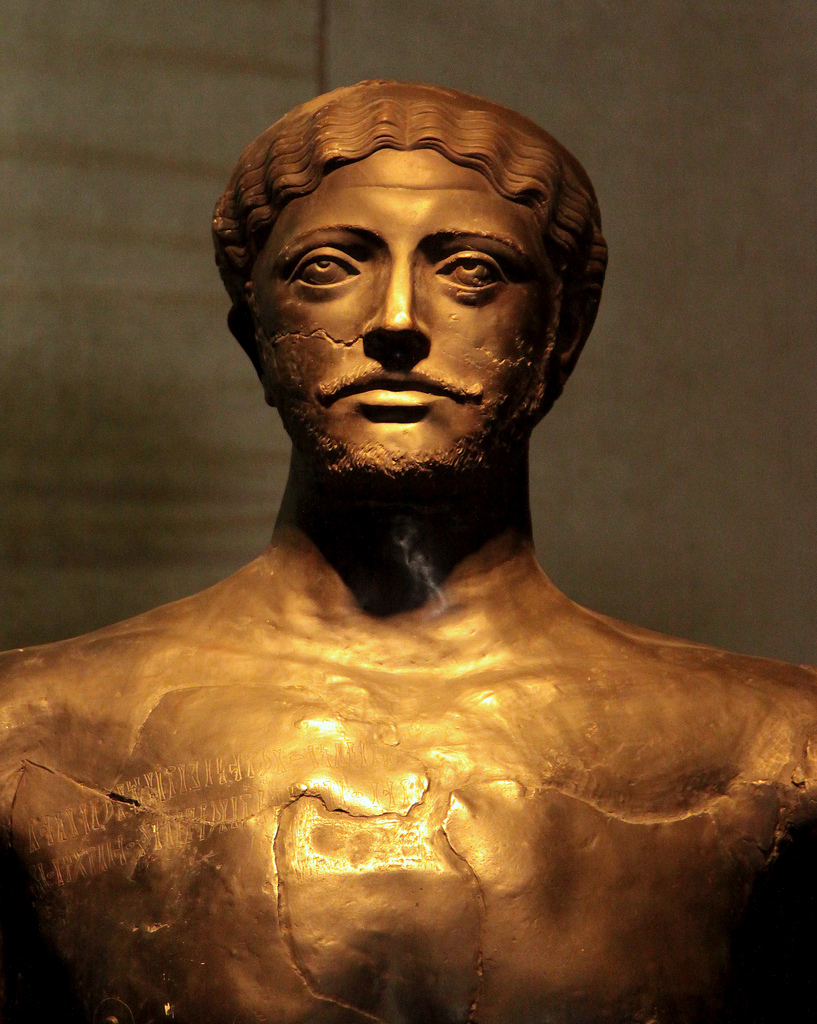
Bust of King Dhamar Ali Yahbur

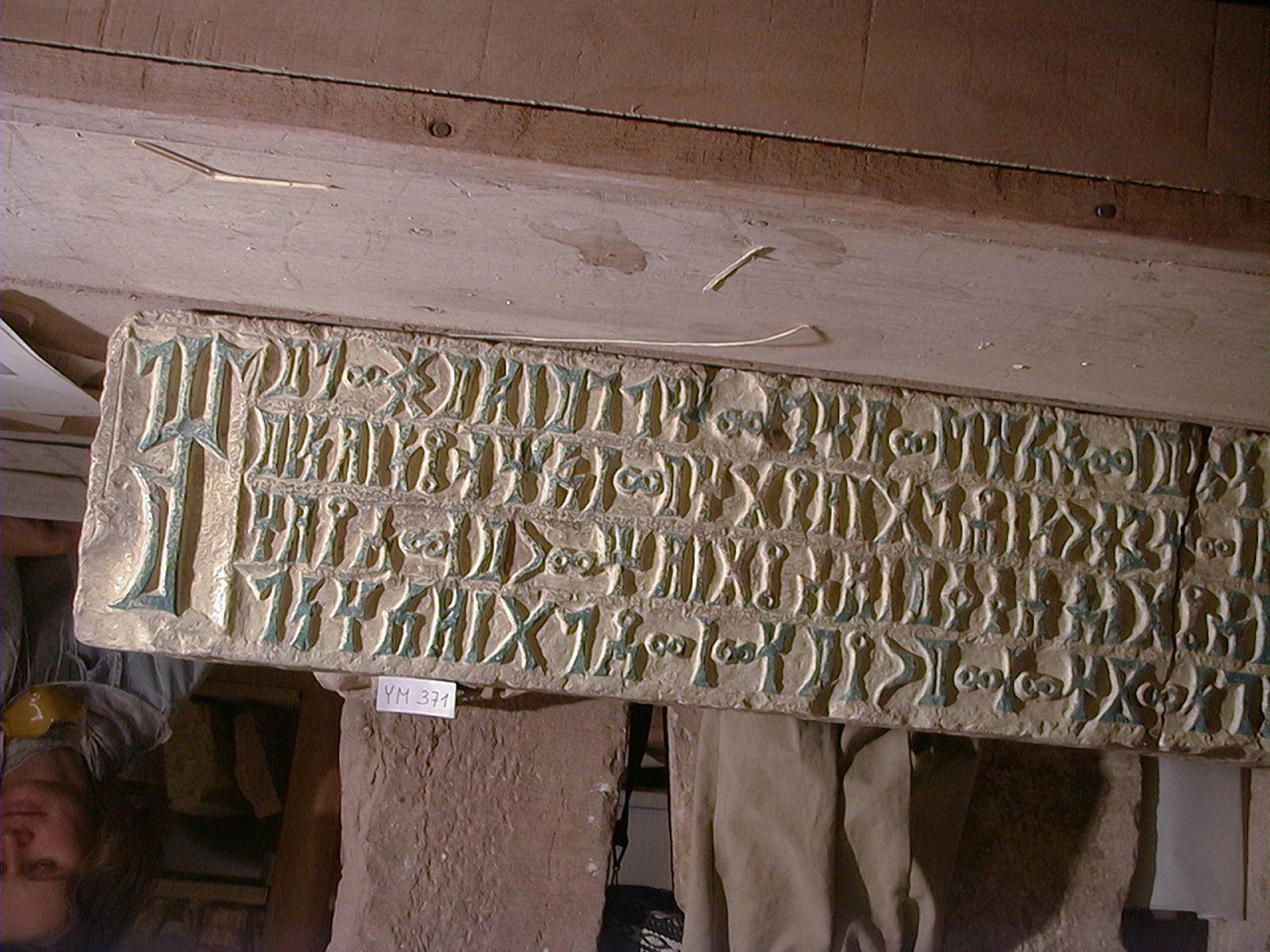

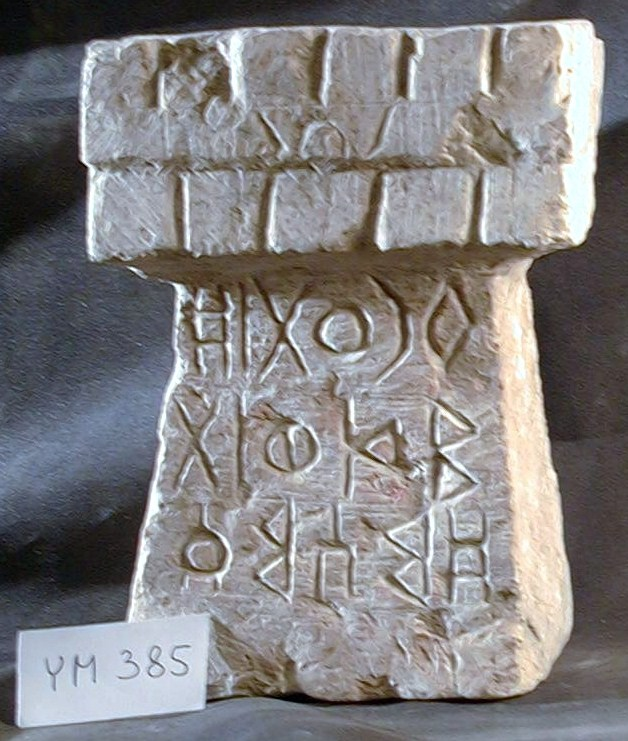

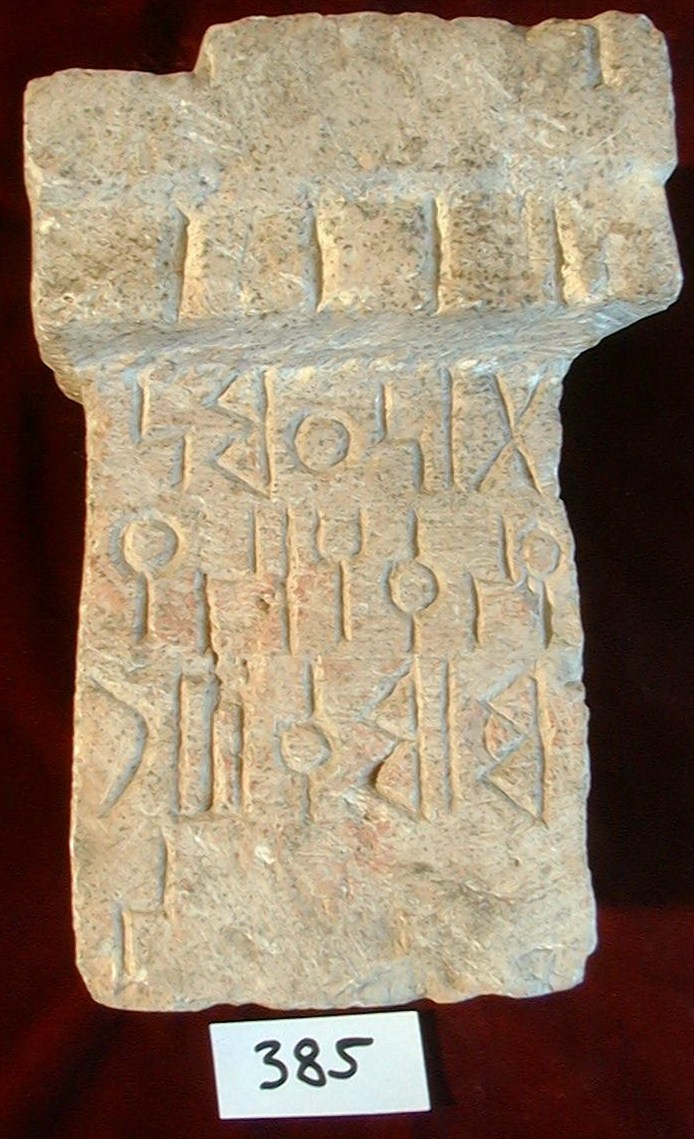

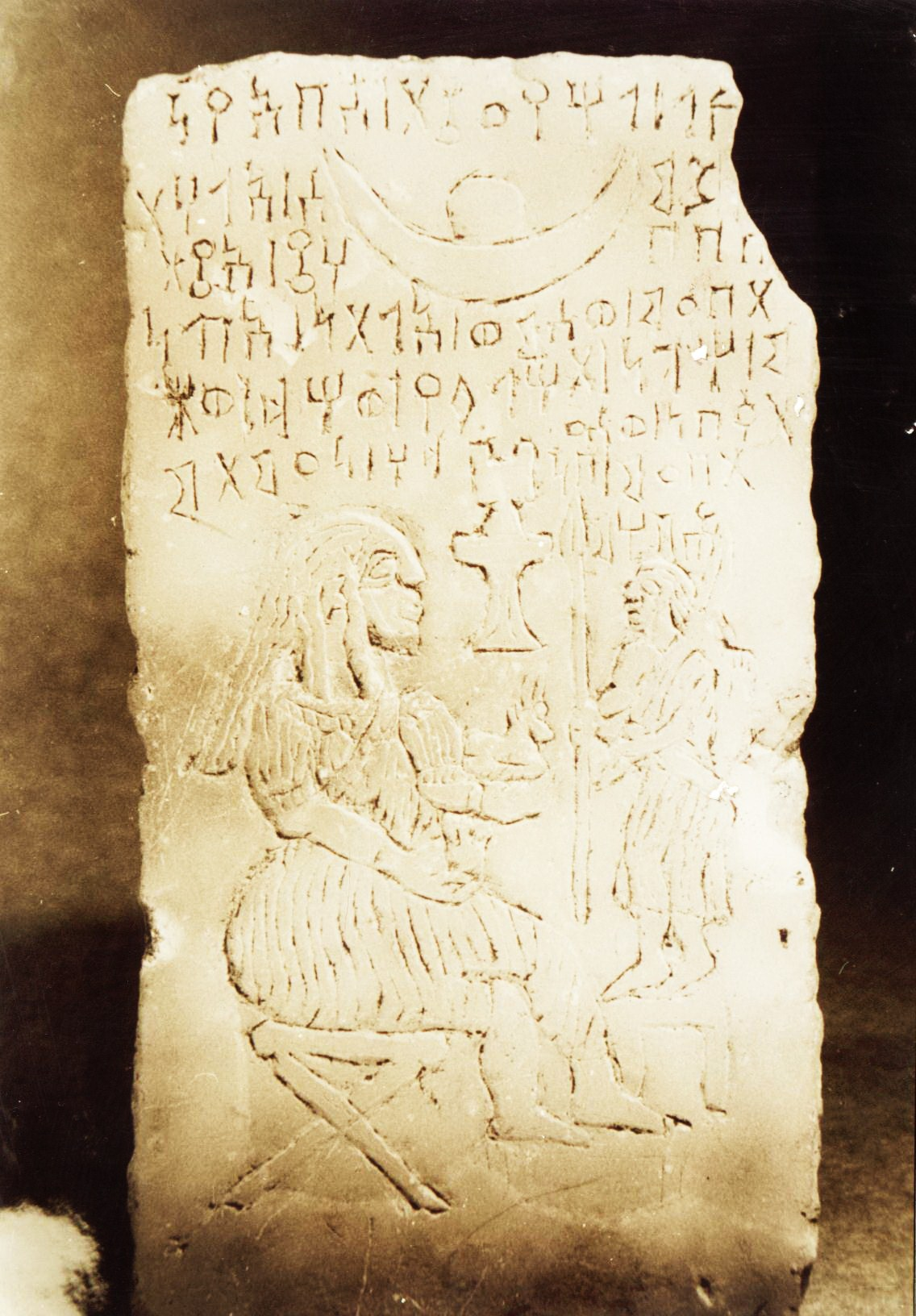

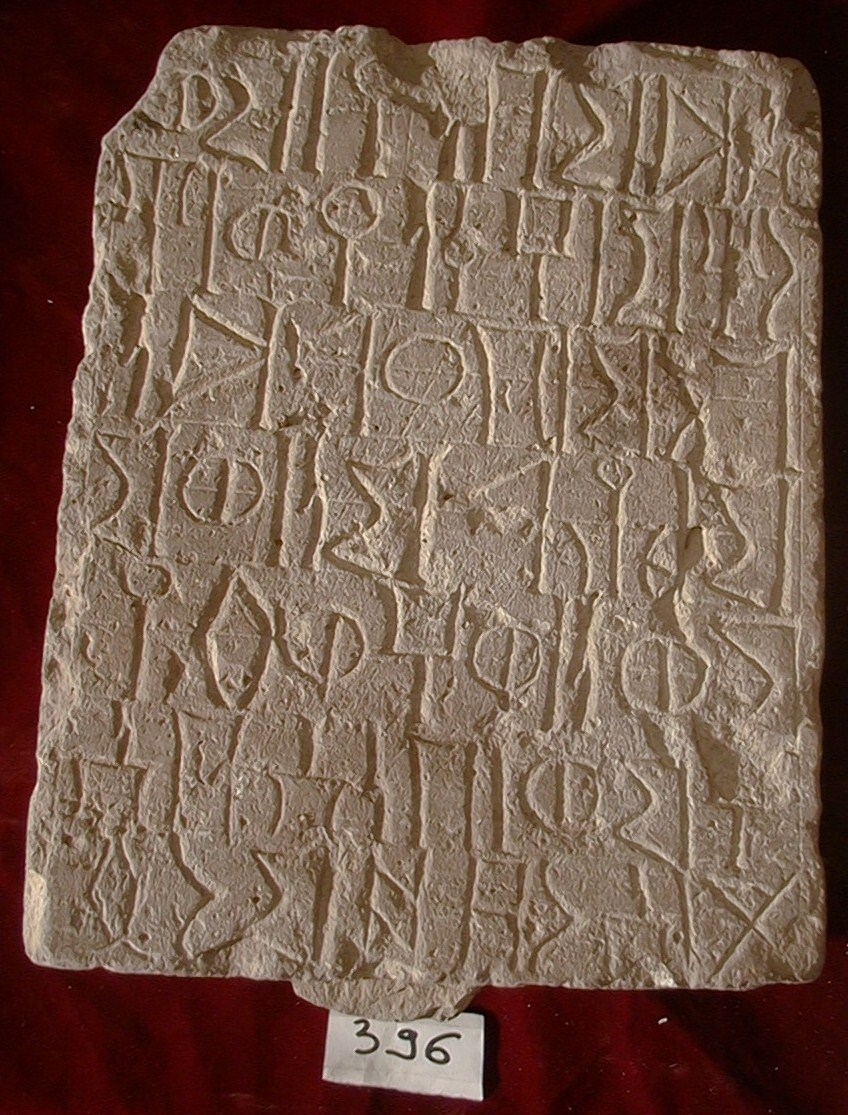

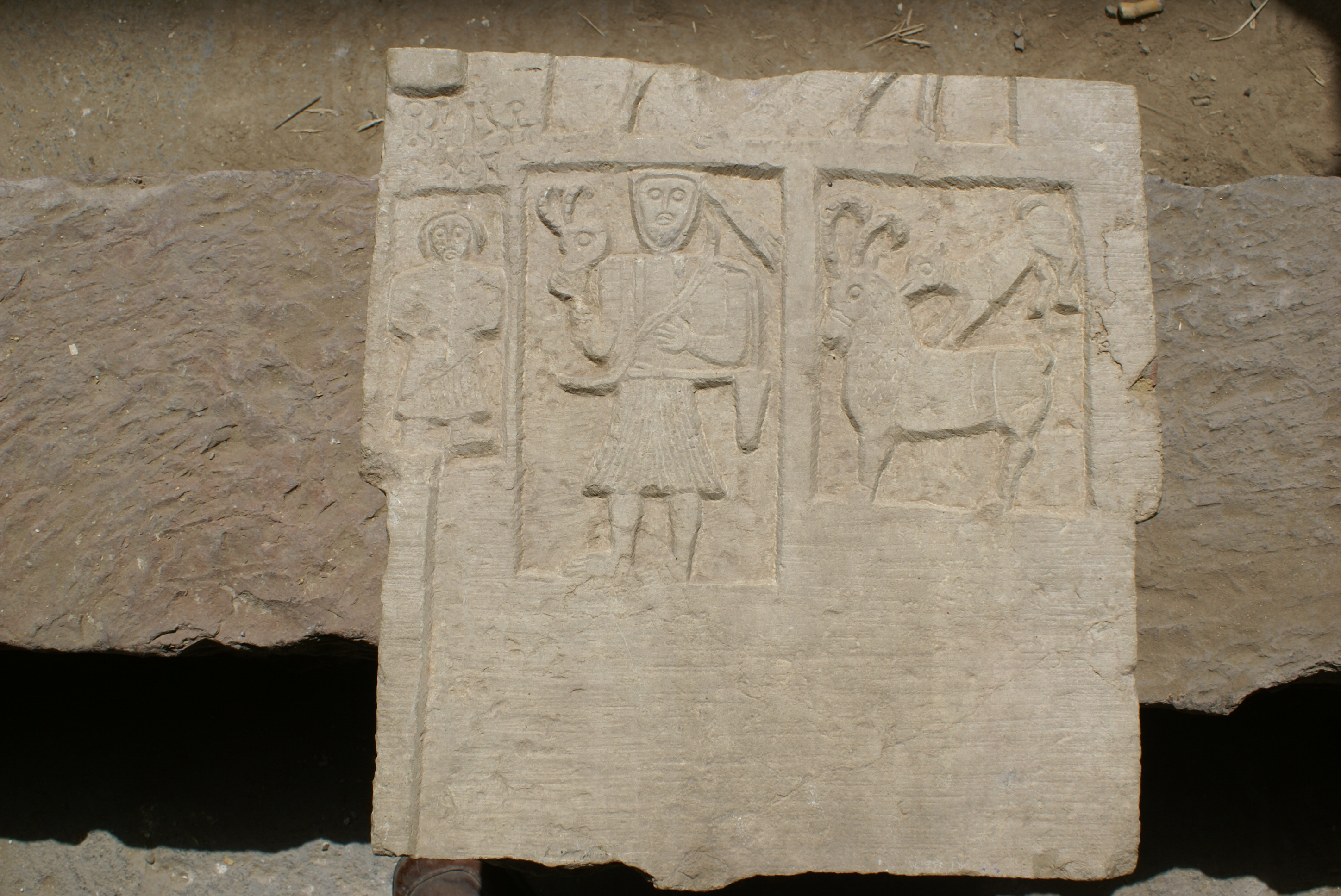

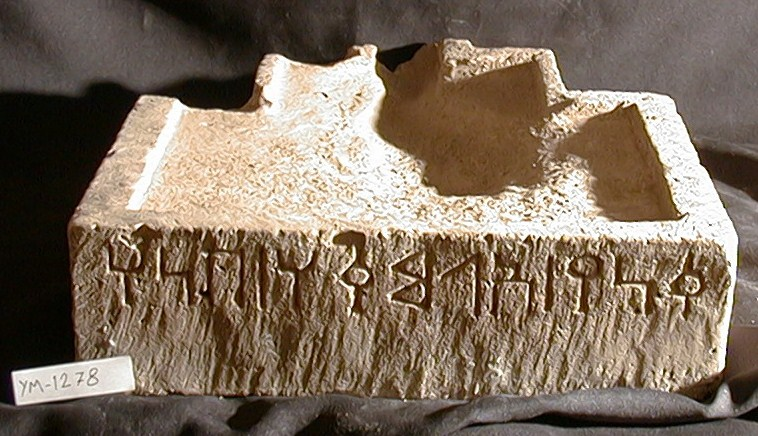

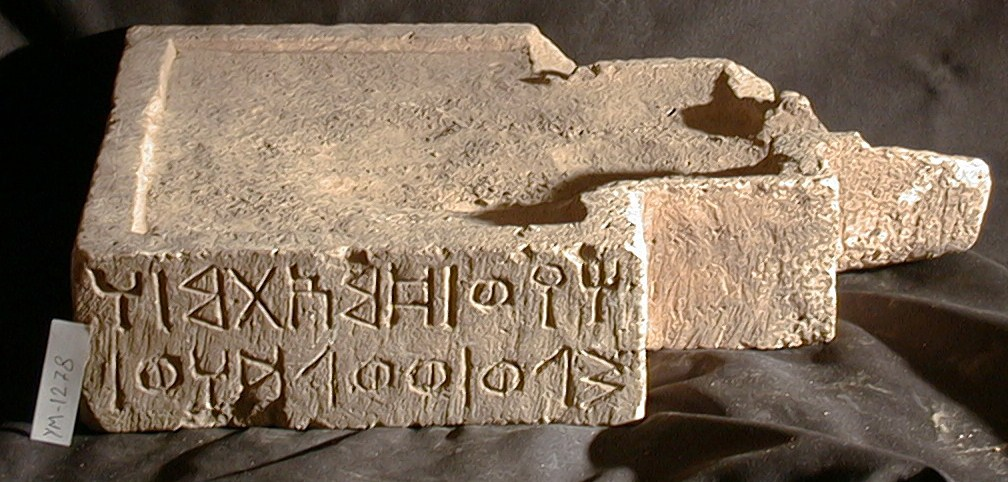

== See also ==
- List of museums in Yemen
