= Legislative Council of Aden =

Type
- Type: Unicameral

History
- Founded: 1947
- Disbanded: 1966
- Succeeded by: Supreme People's Council (South Yemen)
- Seats: 23 (1959)

Elections
- Last election: 1964 election

Meeting place
- Crater, Aden

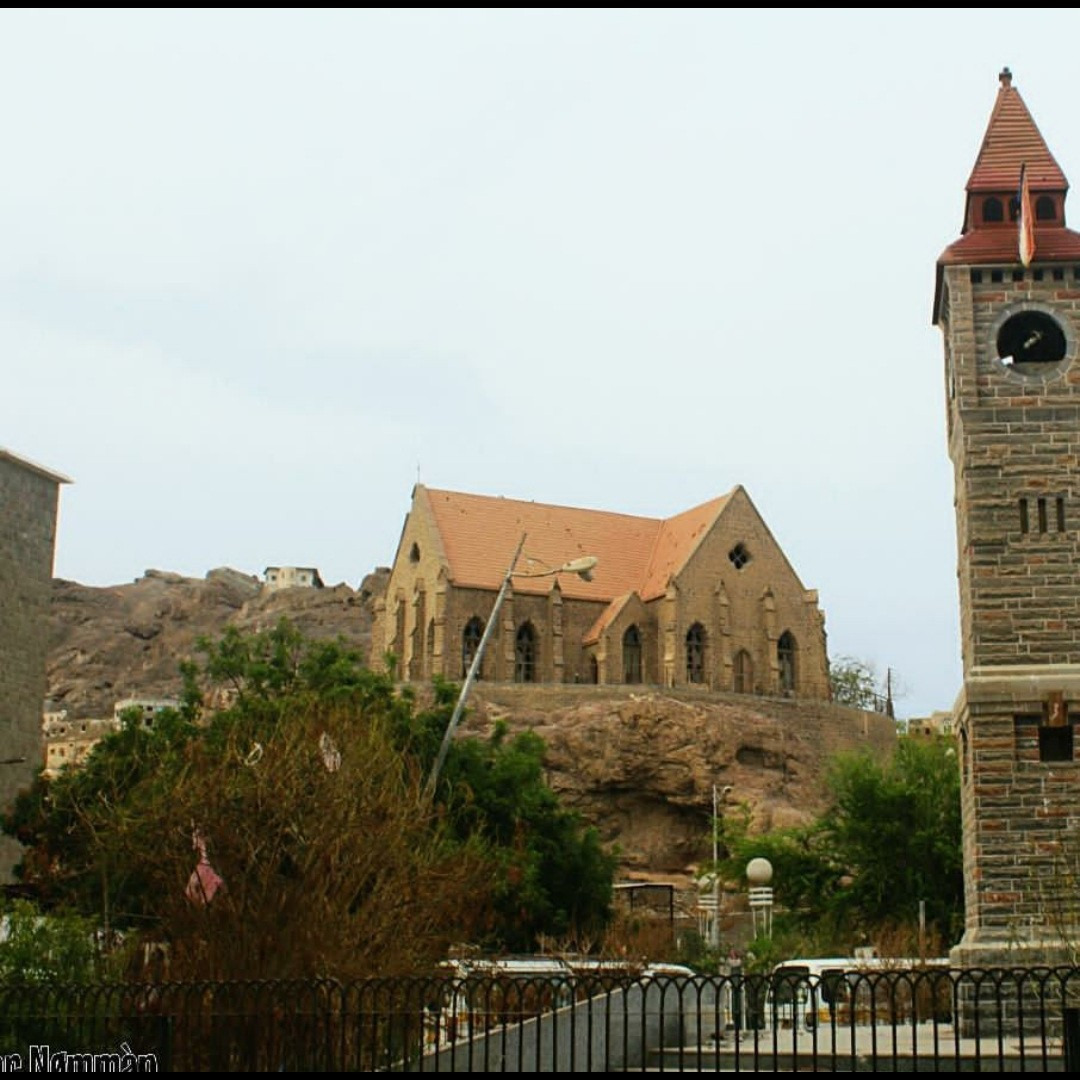
Legislative Council building, former Church of St. Maria in Crater, Aden

The Legislative Council of Aden was the legislative body of Aden Colony and State of Aden from 1947 to 1966.

== History ==
The Legislative Council was established in January 1947. It had 23 members. The legislative term was originally four years but changed to five years in 1962. In 1959 the new Aden Colony constitution introduced a change so that 12 members were elected under a restricted franchise. Nine Arabs, two Somalis and one Indian were elected.

Aden Colony joined South Arabia in 1963, which had a legislative council of sixteen elected members, six nominated members, and attorney-general and a speaker as members.

The council building was burnt down 1966 before the independence of South Yemen. In the end, the council met in El Jabaly building, King Solomon Street, Crater.

== Legislative Council elections ==
- December 1955
- January 1959
- October 1964

== Presidents 1959-1966 ==
The council was presided by the Governor of Aden until 1959, when the position of an independent speaker appointed by the governor was introduced.

- Sir Arthur Eber Sydney Charles, 1959 - 1965. He was assassinated in September 1965.
