= Yemen Military Museum (Sana'a) =

Museum in Sana'a, Yemen

Coordinates: 15°21′11″N 44°12′17″E

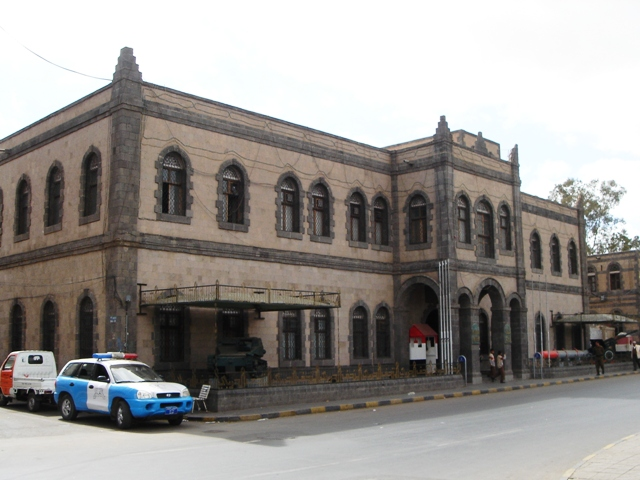
Yemen Military Museum

The Yemen Military Museum or The Military Museum (Arabic: المتحف الحربي) is a museum in central Sana'a, Yemen. It is located on the southwestern corner of the Al-Tahrir Square, next to the National Library of Yemen. It has a wide range of artifacts from ancient artifacts to items during the British occupation and subsequent revolution.

== See also ==
- List of museums in Yemen
