= 1955 Aden Legislative Council election =

Elections to the Legislative Council were held for the first time in the Colony of Aden in 1955. However, only four of the Legislative Council's 18 seats were elected. Restrictions on suffrage were imposed linked to age, gender, property ownership and residency. With only around 5,000 people voting, the restrictions ensured that only loyalists to the government were elected. Following the elections there were protests over the suffrage limitations and calling for independence.

== Background ==
The changes to the Colony's constitution were announced on 20 July 1955. Membership of the Legislative Council was increased from 16 to 18, with one official and one unofficial member added. The number of nominees was reduced from eight to five, one of whom would be chosen by the Governor to represent the business sector.

Of the elected members, one was to be elected by members of Aden Municipal Council and three from single-member constituencies.
