= Sharjah Award for Arab Creativity =

Special Award in the United Arab Emirates

The Sharjah Award for Arab Creativity (SAAC) is an award in the United Arab Emirates that started in 1996. It's organized by the Sharjah Department of Culture and Information. This award is for young Arabs who are between eighteen and forty years old. It aims to find new talents in six areas of writing: short stories, novels, poetry, children's books, theater, and literary criticism.

Winners get the following amount of money: $6,000 for first place, $4,000 for second, and $3,000 for third. Their work also gets published and shown at Sharjah International Book Fair. Winners are invited to a workshop in Sharjah where they can learn more about culture and writing.

== Eligibility Requirements ==
- Participants must be between 18 and 40 years old.
- Entries must be in standard Arabic and must not have won a similar competition, been submitted for a university degree, or been previously published in newspapers or periodicals.
- The submitted work must be the author's first work in this field. No competitor may enter more than one of the competition categories. The submitted work must adhere to religious and ethical values.
- A winner of the competition may not re-enter the competition for another three years.

== Judging ==
- After texts meet the criteria, the Award Secretariat assigns a committee of specialists in each field of the competition to conduct a preliminary screening of the texts, narrowing down to no more than fifty texts in each field that are worthy of competing for the prize.
- The screened texts are submitted to two judges to select the top three winning texts, based on agreed-upon critical criteria. If they fail to agree on these texts, the texts selected by each judge are referred to a deciding judge to select three winning texts from among them. Their decision is final.
- The judging committees provide reasons for their selection of the winning texts and provide the winners with comments on their texts, if any, for necessary modifications before they are published.
