= Tahrir Square, Sanaa =

Coordinates: 15°21′13″N 44°12′21″E

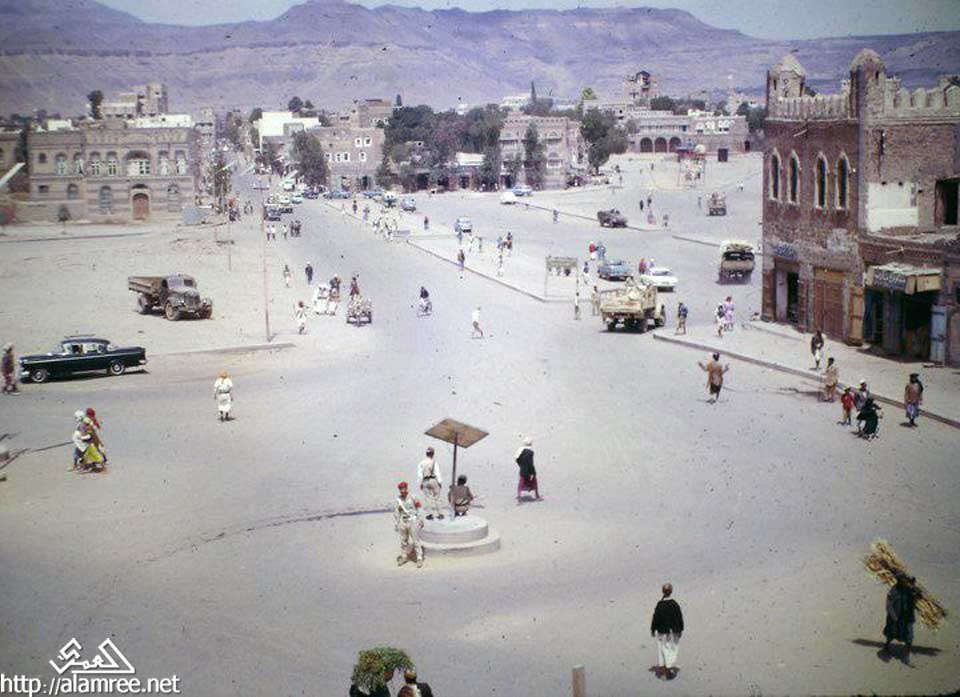
Tahrir Square

Al-Tahrir Square, also known as Al-Tahreer Square or Tahreer Square, is a square in central Sanaa, Yemen. It is located west of the Abbas Mosque and the Sultan Palace Hotel, south of the National Museum of Yemen, and north of the Yemen Military Museum. Protests took place here during the 2011 Yemeni uprising, involving clashes between supporters of President Saleh and his detractors. Tawakel Karman, awarded the 2011 Nobel Peace Prize, made her headquarters a tent pitched at the Square, where she has led weekly Tuesday protests since 2007.

The square was a focal point of the 2014 Yemen protests as part of the Houthi rebellion. On October 9, 2014, a suicide bomb tore through Tahrir Square while Houthis were preparing for a rally. The attack killed 47 people and wounded 75 and has been blamed on al-Qaeda in the Arabian Peninsula.

The square has been used by Houthis for public executions.
