= Saleh Ali al-Sammad =

Former de facto President of Houthis movement in Yemen (1979-2018)

- صالح علي الصمَّاد
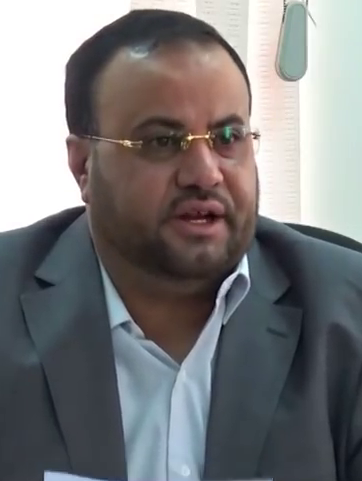
- Al-Sammad in 2018

Chairman of the Supreme Political Council
- Disputed (Note: Tenure as Chairman of the Supreme Political Council disputed by Abdrabbuh Mansur Hadi)
- In office 15 August 2016 – 19 April 2018
- Prime Minister: Talal Aklan (Acting); Abdel-Aziz bin Habtour
- Deputy: Qassem Labozah
- Preceded by: Mohammed Ali al-Houthi (as President of the Revolutionary Committee)
- Succeeded by: Mahdi al-Mashat

Personal details
- Born: 1 January 1979 Bani Ma'az, Sahar District, North Yemen (now Yemen)
- Died: 19 April 2018 (aged 39) Al Hudaydah Governorate, Yemen
- Cause of death: LJ-7 missile
- Education: Sanaa University

Military service
- Allegiance: Houthi movement
- Battles/wars: Houthi insurgency in Yemen; Yemeni Civil War (2014–present)

Saleh Ali al-Sammad (Arabic: صالح علي الصمَّاد, romanized: Ṣalāḥ ʿAlī aṣ-Ṣammād; 1 January 1979 – 19 April 2018) was a Yemeni political figure from the Houthi movement who served as the chairman of Houthi's Supreme Political Council and the de facto president of Yemen until his assassination by a Saudi airstrike.

On 23 April 2018, Houthi officials announced al-Sammad was killed in a Saudi-led coalition drone airstrike.

== Political career ==
Saleh Ali al-Sammad was born in Bani Ma'az in Yemen's Sahar District on 1 January 1979.

He was appointed in September 2014 to serve as a political adviser to President Abdrabbuh Mansur Hadi.

Al-Sammad struck a conciliatory posture during and after the 2014–15 coup. In November 2014, after the Houthis withdrew from Yemen's "unity government", he expressed support for most of Hadi's cabinet choices, including Prime Minister Khaled Bahah.

As of February 2015, after the Houthi takeover of the government, he was described as "the senior Houthi leader in Sana'a".

In February 2015, al-Sammad said the Houthis hoped for normal relations with the United States and other countries and suggested that the group was interested in sharing power with other political factions, potentially including members of the deposed House of Representatives in a new, 551-member parliament.

On 6 August 2016, al-Sammad became head of the Supreme Political Council. He was sworn in on 14 August.

On 15 August 2016, the Supreme Revolutionary Committee handed power to the Supreme Political Council.

== Death ==
On 19 April 2018, Al-Sammad was killed by a Saudi-led coalition drone strike, making him the most senior Houthi casualty. The weapon was an LJ-7 or AKD-10 air-to-surface missile, possibly fired from a Wing Loong II UCAV. On 26 April, Saudi Arabia claimed responsibility for his death, saying that he was targeted after he threatened to launch missiles against Saudi Arabia. Al-Arabiya TV reported that the coalition had monitored his "precise movements before the strike." Saudi Arabia's ambassador to the United States, Prince Khaled bin Salman, wrote on Twitter that "The heroes of the Royal Air Force were able to successfully target the leader of the Houthi militia Saleh al-Sammad." Khaled bin Salman stated that his brother Crown Prince Mohammed had ordered the strike.

Abdul-Malik al-Houthi, the top leader of the Houthi movement, stated that "the forces of aggression, led by America and Saudi Arabia, bear the legal responsibility for this crime and all its consequences."

== See also ==
- Samad (UAV)

== Notes and references ==
Notes

Political offices
Preceded by Mohammed al-Houthi as President of the Revolutionary Committee of Yemen	Chairman of the Supreme Political Council of Yemen; 2016–2018	Succeeded by Mahdi al-Mashat
