= Talal Aklan =

Yemeni politician

- طلال عقلان
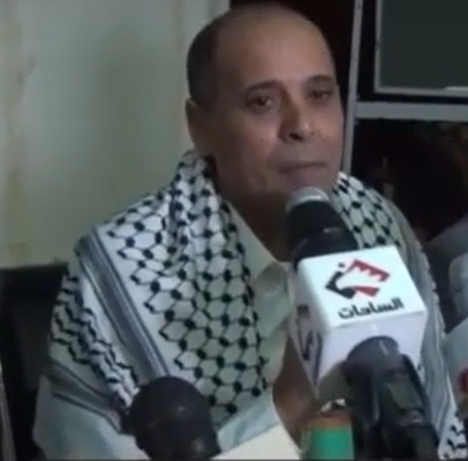

Prime Minister of Yemen (Supreme Political Council)
- Disputed (Note: Disputed by Khaled Bahah (Mar–Apr 2016) and Ahmed Obeid bin Daghr (Apr–Oct 2016))
- Acting; 1 March 2016 – 4 October 2016
- President: Mohammed Ali al-Houthi; Saleh Ali al-Sammad
- Preceded by: Khaled Bahah (as undisputed Prime Minister)
- Succeeded by: Abdel-Aziz bin Habtour

Minister of Civil Service and Insurance
- Disputed
- In office 28 November 2016 – 24 April 2021
- President: Saleh Ali al-Sammad
- Prime Minister: Abdel-Aziz bin Habtour
- Succeeded by: Salim Al-Mughalis

Member of the Revolutionary Committee
- Incumbent
- Assumed office 6 February 2015
- President: Mohammed Ali al-Houthi

Personal details
- Born: Talal Abdulkarim Aklan
- Party: Yemeni Socialist Party

Military service
- Allegiance: Houthis
- Battles/wars: Houthi insurgency in Yemen

Talal Abdulkarim Aklan (Arabic: طلال عبدالکریم عقلان, romanized: Ṭalāl ʿAbd al-Karīm ʿAqlān) is a Yemeni politician who was the acting Prime Minister of the Houthis government until 4 October 2016.

Between 2015 and 2016, he was a member of the Supreme Revolutionary Committee.

Political offices
Preceded by Khaled Bahah	Prime Minister of Yemen; Disputed, acting 2016	Succeeded by Abdel-Aziz bin Habtour
