= Battle of Sanaa (2014) =

Houthi capture of Sanaa from the Hadi-led government

- Part of the Yemeni civil war (2014-present)
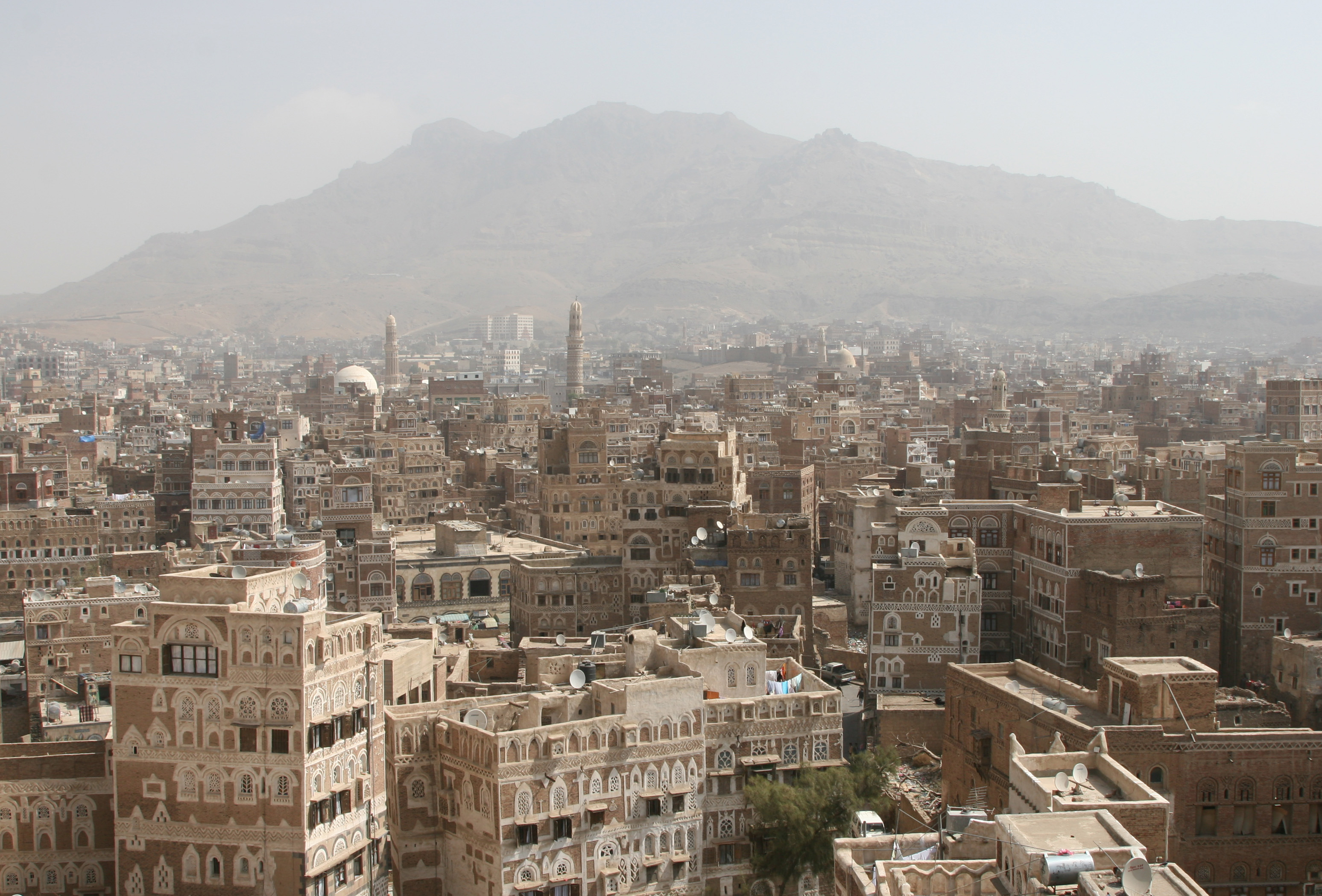
- Old City of Sanaa
Date	16–21 September 2014 (5 days)
Location	Sanaa, Yemen
Result	Houthi victory; Fall of Sanaa; Prime Minister Basindawa resigns; General al-Ahmar flees Yemen; Power-sharing deal negotiated

Belligerents
Houthis	Government of Yemen: Yemeni Armed Forces; People's Committees; Al-Islah militias

Commanders and leaders
Abdul-Malik al-Houthi; Mohammed Ali al-Houthi; Mohammed Abdul Salam	(Yemen) Abdrabbuh Hadi (Yemen) Mohammed Basindawa (Yemen) Ali Mohsen al-Ahmar

Casualties and losses
100+ killed	Unknown
- 274–340 killed overall

The Battle of Sanaa in 2014 marked the advance of the Houthis into Sanaa, the capital of Yemen, and heralded the beginning of the armed takeover of the government that unfolded over the following months. Fighting began on 9 September 2014, when pro-Houthi protesters under the command of Abdul-Malik al-Houthi marched on the cabinet office and were fired upon by security forces, leaving seven dead. The clashes escalated on 18 September, when 40 were killed in an armed confrontation between the Houthis led by military commander Mohammed Ali al-Houthi and supporters of the Sunni hardliner Islah Party when the Houthis tried to seize Yemen TV, and 19 September, with more than 60 killed in clashes between Houthi fighters and the military and police in northern Sanaa. By 21 September, the Houthis captured the government headquarters, marking the fall of Sanaa.

== Background ==
Zaydi Muslims loyal to Abdul-Malik al-Houthi, a powerful tribal leader from the northern Saada Governorate, participated in the Yemeni Revolution in 2011 and 2012. However, the Houthis also clashed with Islamists from Yemen's Islah party, with sporadic and sometimes intense fighting in the northern village of Dammaj, as well as several neighboring governorates. In January 2014, the Yemeni government began evacuating Wahhabi residents from Saada Governorate, handing victory in the region to the Houthis. The Houthi insurgents pressed their advantage, seizing control of 'Amran in a bloody battle with Islah Party-aligned jihadists loyal to General Ali Mohsen al-Ahmar and entering the Sanaa Governorate by July.

In August, the Houthis began holding mass demonstrations in Sanaa, pressuring President Abd Rabbuh Mansur Hadi to reverse a cut to fuel subsidies and calling on the government to step down. Representatives of the group met with government officials in an attempt to find a solution to the standoff, but the Houthis rejected the government's concessions as insufficient.

On 9 September, Houthi protesters in northwest Sanaa were fired upon by security forces as they marched on the cabinet office. Seven were killed.

== Battle ==
=== Houthis storm Sanaa ===
Fighting broke out between the Houthis and army units in northwest Sanaa on 16 September and continued into the following day.

On 18 September, fighting claimed 40 lives in the district where Yemen TV, the state broadcast station, is located in northern Sanaa. The Houthis and loyalists of the Islah Party, both heavily armed, fought over the neighbourhood. The Houthis also reportedly attacked an army position, escalating the conflict further. Flights into and out of Sanaa International Airport were suspended.

Houthi fighters attacked Sanaa in earnest on 19 September, shelling the state television station and clashing with both government forces and Sunni militias. The Houthis took Saddeq Hill, overlooking Al-Iman University and the military headquarters of General Ali Mohsen al-Ahmar. They also fired on a military aircraft, although it was unclear if they succeeded in forcing it down. More than 60 were killed in clashes on 19 September. President Abd Rabbuh Mansur Hadi met with the ambassadors of G10 states and called the Houthi attack an "attempted coup" against his government. UN envoy Jamal Benomar urged a peaceful end to the fighting.

=== Government bows to pressure ===
Yemen TV continued to burn on 20 September as the Houthis advanced deeper into Sanaa. That evening, Benomar announced an agreement that would end the crisis.

By 21 September, the Houthis declared themselves in control of Sanaa, having taken over the offices of the prime minister, the state television building, and military headquarters. Al-Ahmar's forces reportedly surrendered to the Houthis after fighting, although the general himself was believed to have escaped capture. The rebels signed a deal with the government, prompting Prime Minister Mohammed Basindawa to resign. However, they refused to sign an annex to the agreement under which security forces would resume control of areas seized by the Houthis and confiscate the Houthis' weapons. Nonetheless, Hadi declared an immediate ceasefire and urged all factions to respect the agreement. Basindawa criticised Hadi in his resignation, saying "autocratic measures" shut him out of the political process and kept his government "in the dark" with regard to Yemen's deteriorating security situation.

Sanaa was widely regarded as having fallen to the Houthis in just a handful of days. Several Arab publications described the events as "shocking" and suggested they marked a major turning point for the country, which had been labouring through a protracted political crisis since the 2011 uprising that dislodged longtime president Ali Abdullah Saleh.

== Aftermath ==
While the Houthis gained control of the capital and used the threat of force as leverage to wring concessions out of the government, including Basindawa's resignation, more subsidies on fuel, and a pledge to form a "unity government", they refrained from an immediate coup d'état. However, the group maintained control of key points in the city, despite the government's call for the Houthis to turn them over to security forces, and it kept a firm grip on the government. In October, when Hadi moved to appoint his chief of staff, Ahmed Awad bin Mubarak, as prime minister to replace Basindawa, the Houthis effectively vetoed the choice.

Al Jazeera later claimed to have received taped phone conversations between Ali Abdullah Saleh, the former president, and Houthi officials indicating that Saleh aided the Houthis in their takeover of Sanaa. Saleh's party, the General People's Congress, joined the Houthis in announcing an eleventh-hour boycott of the unity government led by Hadi and Prime Minister Khaled Bahah in November.

The Houthis continued to apply pressure on the weakened unity government, kidnapping bin Mubarak for several days in January 2015 in an attempt to gain more control over the drafting of a new constitution. They stepped up their efforts by shelling Hadi's residence and capturing the presidential palace on 20 January, actions from which they had refrained in September 2014. These attacks prompted Hadi, Bahah, and the entire cabinet to resign. The Houthis then took control of the House of Representatives, declared it dissolved, and installed a Revolutionary Committee to administer the country in February 2015.

== See also ==
- Fall of Kabul (2021)
- Fall of Saigon
- Fall of Phnom Penh
- Fall of Damascus (2024)
