= Rafat Al-Akhali =

Yemeni politician

Rafat Ali Al-Akhali

Minister of Youth and Sports
- In office 7 November 2014 – September 2015
- President: Abdrabbuh Mansur Hadi
- Prime Minister: Khaled Bahah
- Preceded by: Moamar al-Eryani
- Succeeded by: Nayef al-Bakri

Rafat Ali Al-Akhali (Arabic: رأفت علي الأكحلي) is a Yemeni politician and economist. He served as Minister of Youth and Sports in the Government of Yemen.
