= October 2015 Aden hotel bombings =

Attempted ISIL assassination of Yemeni Prime Minister

- Part of the Aden unrest and the Yemeni civil war (2014–present)
- Location of Aden Governorate in Yemen
- Location: Aden, Aden Governorate, Yemen
- Date: 6 October 2015
- Target: Yemeni Prime Minister and Vice President Khaled Bahah
- Attack type: Suicide bombings
- Deaths: 18 (Note: 11 Yemeni soldiers, 3 UAE soldiers, 1 Saudi Arabian soldier, 3 ISIL suicide bombers)
- Injuries: Unknown
- Perpetrator: Islamic State – Yemen Province

On 6 October 2015, two attackers drove bomb-laden military vehicles into the Al-Qasr hotel which housed the Vice President and Prime Minister of Yemen Khaled Bahah. A third attacker drove another vehicle into a military base of the Arab coalition. The prime minister escaped unharmed. Although Yemeni Transport Minister Badr Basalma first suspected a Houthi missile attack, the Islamic State claimed responsibility for the attack.
