= Muhammad al-Houthi =

Former de facto President of Yemen

- محمد الحوثي
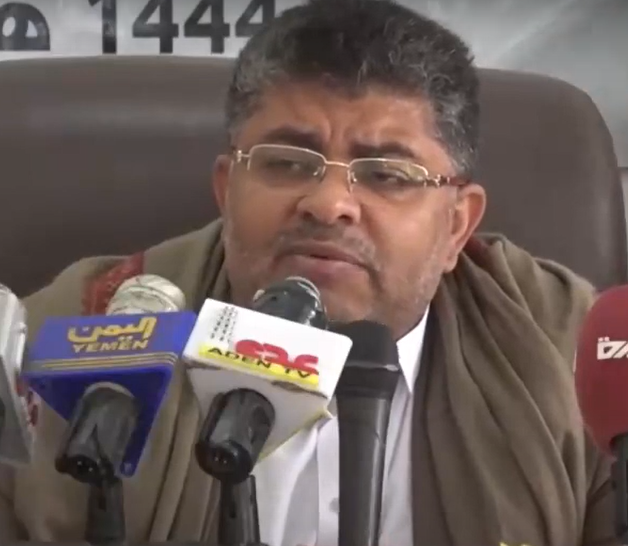
- al-Houthi in 2023

Head of State of Yemen
- Disputed (Note: Tenure as President of the Supreme Revolutionary Committee of Yemen disputed by Abdrabbuh Mansur Hadi)
- In office 6 February 2015 – 15 August 2016
- Prime Minister: Talal Aklan (Acting)
- Deputy: Naef Ahmed al-Qanis
- Preceded by: Abdrabbuh Mansur Hadi (as President of Yemen)
- Succeeded by: Saleh Ali al-Sammad (as Chairman of the Supreme Political Council)

President of the Supreme Revolutionary Committee of Yemen
- Incumbent
- Assumed office 6 February 2015
- President: Himself; Saleh Ali al-Sammad; Mahdi al-Mashat
- Prime Minister: Talal Aklan (Acting); Abdel-Aziz bin Habtour; Ahmed al-Rahawi; Muhammad Miftah
- Deputy: Naef Ahmed al-Qanis
- Preceded by: Office Established

Senior Member Supreme Political Council
- Incumbent
- Assumed office 15 October 2020
- President: Mahdi al-Mashat
- Prime Minister: Abdel-Aziz bin Habtour

Personal details
- Born: Muhammad Ali al-Houthi; 1979 (age 46–47) Saada, North Yemen
- Relations: Abdul-Malik al-Houthi (cousin); Hussein al-Houthi (cousin); Yahia al-Houthi (cousin)

Military service
- Allegiance: Houthi movement
- Battles/wars: Houthi insurgency in Yemen; Yemeni Civil War (2014–present)

Muhammad Ali al-Houthi (Note: Arabic: محمد الحوثي, romanized: Muḥammad ʿAlī al-Ḥūthī) (born 1979) is a Yemeni politician who was the former president of the Revolutionary Committee or Revolutionary Council, a body formed by Houthi militants, and the de facto President of Yemen. He is one of the military field commanders who led the group's seizure of the Yemeni capital Sana’a in September 2014, and eventually became the de facto leader of Yemen after the Houthi takeover of the Yemeni government in 2015. He is a cousin of Abdul-Malik al-Houthi, the group's leader.

According to the 6 February 2015 statement by a Houthi representative, the Revolutionary Committee is in charge of governing Yemen and forming a new parliament, which will then appoint a five-member presidential council. However, other reports indicated the committee itself would serve as the presidential council.

Al-Houthi has been described as a "former political prisoner".

== Early life and training ==
Muhammad Ali al-Houthi was born in 1979 in Saada, North Yemen. He joined the Iranian revolutionary guards before 2004.

== Presidency ==
Mahmoud Al-Junaid was named as director of the presidential office on 9 February 2015, although he declined to confirm to the Yemen Times whether he was working for them.

The newspaper Asharq al-Awsat reported on 19 February that al-Houthi had been sacked over the lack of an agreement among Yemen's political factions to support the Houthis' transitional authority, but a senior Houthi leader denied that he had been dismissed. The next day, Reuters and other news outlets reported that UN-led negotiations had produced a tentative agreement regarding the Yemeni parliament, but it did not address the political dispute over the presidency.

On 21 March 2015, al-Houthi spoke at a meeting of the Revolutionary Committee, giving an address in which he said Abdrabbuh Mansur Hadi's term of office legally ended on 21 February 2015 and his legitimacy had expired. He criticised foreign governments for continuing to back Hadi, accusing them of "blatant interference" in Yemeni affairs.

Al-Houthi was injured by a Royal Saudi Air Force strike in Sana'a during the first night of a military intervention in Yemen led by Saudi Arabia on 25 March 2015, according to Al Jazeera.

Houthi-controlled state media reported in November 2015 that al-Houthi sent a letter to United Nations Secretary-General Ban Ki-moon calling on the UN to restrain the Saudi-led coalition and accusing the coalition of "war crimes" and "genocides" against Yemen.

On 15 August 2016, the Supreme Revolutionary Committee handed power to the Supreme Political Council.

=== International reactions ===
The United Nations, the United States and the Gulf Cooperation Council refused to recognise the legitimacy of the Houthi declaration placing al-Houthi and the Revolutionary Committee in charge of Yemen's government. The UN Security Council adopted a resolution on 15 February 2015 calling on the Houthis to relinquish control of state institutions, with Secretary-General Ban Ki-moon warning that Yemen teetered on the verge of state failure.

On 9 November 2018, an opinion article by al-Houthi calling for peace in Yemen was published in The Washington Post.

On 11 January 2021, the United States designated al-Houthi's movement as a "terrorist organization". Al-Houthi condemned the move by saying that the group "reserves its right to respond" to any designation by the Trump administration. Al-Houthi himself was also blacklisted by the United States government in the same measure.

== Notes ==
Political offices
Preceded by Abdrabbuh Mansur Hadi as President of Yemen	President of the Supreme Revolutionary Committee of Yemen; 2015–2016	Succeeded by Saleh Ali al-Sammad as President of the Supreme Political Council of Yemen
