= Ahmed Obaid Bin Dagher =

Yemeni politician

- أحمد عبيد بن دغر
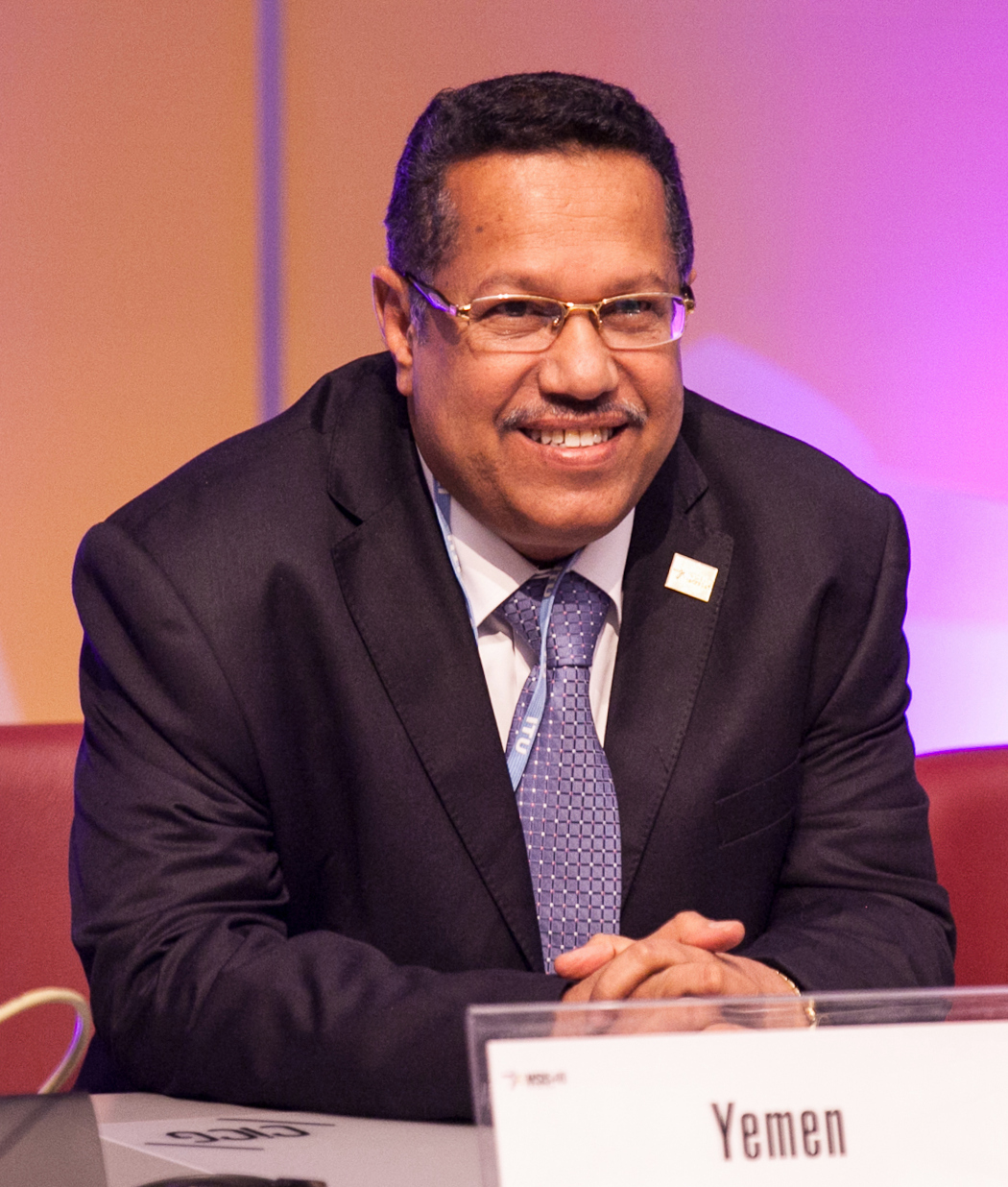
- Dagher in 2014

Speaker of the Shura Council
- Incumbent
- Assumed office 15 January 2021

9th Prime Minister of Yemen
- Disputed (Note: Tenure as Prime Minister of Yemen disputed by Talal Aklan (Mar–Oct 2016) and Abdel-Aziz bin Habtour (2016–2018))
- In office 4 April 2016 – 15 October 2018
- President: Abdrabbuh Mansur Hadi
- Deputy: Abdulmalik Al-Mekhlafi; Mohamed Abdelaziz al-Jabari; Hussein Arab
- Preceded by: Khaled Bahah
- Succeeded by: Maeen Abdulmalik Saeed

Deputy Prime Minister of Yemen
- In office August 2015 – 4 April 2016
- President: Abdrabbuh Mansur Hadi
- Prime Minister: Khaled Bahah
- In office 11 June 2014 – 9 November 2014
- President: Abdrabbuh Mansur Hadi
- Prime Minister: Mohammed Basindawa; Abdullah Mohsen al-Akwa (Acting)

Minister of Communication of Yemen
- In office 11 December 2011 – 9 November 2014
- President: Ali Abdullah Saleh; Abdrabbuh Mansur Hadi
- Prime Minister: Mohammed Basindawa; Abdullah Mohsen al-Akwa (Acting)
- Preceded by: Kamal Jabri
- Succeeded by: Lutfi Bachrif

Personal details
- Born: 2 December 1952 (age 73) Shibam district, Aden Protectorate
- Party: General People's Congress
- *Daghr's term has been disputed by Talal Aklan and Abdel-Aziz bin Habtour.

Ahmed Obaid Bin Dagher (Arabic: أحمد عبيد بن دغر; born 2 December 1952) is a Yemeni politician who is the speaker of the Shura Council since 2021. Prior to his tenure as speaker, Dagher was the Prime Minister of Yemen from 2016 to 2018, and Deputy Prime Minister in 2014 and from 2015 to 2016.

== Early life ==
Ahmed Obaid Bin Dagher was born in the Shibam district, Aden Protectorate, on 2 December 1952.

== Career ==
Dagher was a member of the Yemeni Socialist Party and General People's Congress. During Mohammed Basindawa's tenure as prime minister Dagher served as Minister of Communications. In 2014, he was appointed Deputy Prime Minister under Basindawa while retaining his ministry role. He was appointed to succeed Basindawa in 2016. On 22 September 2016, Dagher returned to Yemen by flying from Riyadh along with seven ministers to Aden.

In 2018, fighting that killed at least 36 people broke out after President Abdrabbuh Mansour Hadi refused to remove Bagher as prime minister, a demand issued by separatists supported by the United Arab Emirates. Dagher was dismissed by Hadi on 15 October 2018, and replaced by Maeen Abdulmalik Saeed.

In 2016, Dagher requested the International Monetary Fund to freeze the assets of the Central Bank of Yemen in Sanaa. On 18 September 2022, the Central Bank of Yemen was moved from Sanaa to Aden by Hadi. Dagher stated that the government would continue to pay the public employees, but millions of public employees went unpaid.

On 15 January 2021, Dagher was appointed speaker of the Shura Council. The New Arab stated that the position was honorary and that the Shura Council had no power.

== Notes and references ==
Notes

== Works cited ==
=== News ===
- "لمجلس الشورى ونواب لهصدور قرار رئيس الجمهورية بتعيين رئيساً". Yemen TV. 15 January 2021. Archived from the original on 15 January 2021.
- "من هو أحمد عبيد بن دغر رئيس الوزراء اليمني الجديد؟ | صحيفة المواطن الإلكترونية". Al Mowaten. 4 April 2016. Archived from the original on 19 June 2025.
- "36 Dead, 185 Wounded in Fighting in Southern Yemen". Voice of America. 29 January 2018. Archived from the original on 19 June 2025.
- "Feud over Yemen central bank deepens economic woes". Middle East Eye. 29 March 2022. Archived from the original on 19 June 2025.
- "Yemen exile government returns to Aden". Agence France-Presse. 22 September 2016. Archived from the original on 5 May 2022.
- Ahmed, Zakaria (17 January 2021). "رئيساً للحكومة اليمنيةإقالة بن دغر وإحالته للتحقيق ومعين عبدالملك". The New Arab. Archived from the original on 19 June 2025.
- Al-Jadeed, Al-Araby (15 October 2018). "إقالة بن دغر وإحالته للتحقيق ومعين عبدالملك رئيساً للحكومة اليمنية". The New Arab. Archived from the original on 19 June 2025.

=== Web ===
- Artvukhina, Morgan (12 August 2021). "The Other Yemen War: Houthi, Government Central Bank Rivalry Threatens Currency's Collapse" (PDF). United States Department of Justice. Archived (PDF) from the original on 19 June 2025.

Political offices
Preceded by Khaled Bahah	Prime Minister of Yemen; 2016–2018	Succeeded by Maeen Abdulmalik Saeed
