= Nayef al-Bakri =

Yemeni politician (born 1975)

- نايف البكري
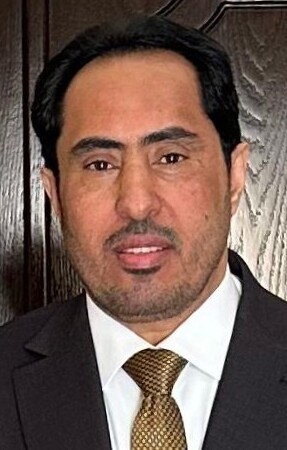
- Bakri in 2026

Minister of Youth and Sports
- Incumbent
- Assumed office 15 September 2015
- President: Abdrabbuh Mansur Hadi Rashad al-Alimi
- Prime Minister: Shaya al-Zindani
- Preceded by: Rafat Al-Akhali

Governor of Aden Governorate
- In office 20 July 2015 – 9 October 2015
- President: Abdrabbuh Mansur Hadi
- Preceded by: Abdel-Aziz bin Habtour
- Succeeded by: Jaafar Mohammed Saad

Deputy Governor of Aden Governorate
- In office 31 October 2013 – 20 July 2015
- President: Abdrabbuh Mansur Hadi
- Preceded by: Sultan Al-Shaibi
- Succeeded by: Ali al-Ghoraib

Personal details
- Born: Nayef Saleh al-Bakri; 29 May 1975 (age 51) Lahij Governorate, Yemen
- Party: Al-Islah (24 July 2004 - 30 June 2015); Independent (2015 - present)

Military service
- Branch/service: Popular Resistance Militia
- Rank: General

Nayef Saleh Abdulqader al-Bakri (Arabic: نايف صالح البكري; born 29 May 1975) is a Yemeni politician who served as minister of youth and sports. He was appointed in mid-September 2015, succeeding Rafat Al Akhali.

Bakri served briefly as Governor of Aden in 2015. He previously acted as deputy to Governor Abdel-Aziz bin Habtour. After bin Habtour fled Aden amid intense fighting between pro-Houthi fighters and government loyalists, Bakri became the head of the local Resistance Council. He was appointed governor in July. During his brief tenure as governor, Bakri was considered controversial, but he was very popular with anti-Houthi fighters who defended the city during its months-long assault. After he was tapped to join the Bahah cabinet, members of the Southern Movement protested in Aden, calling for his return.

Bakri's eventual replacement as governor, Major General Jaafar Mohammed Saad, was assassinated in December 2015.

He was a former member of Al-Islah, until he resigned in April 2015.
