= Abdel-Aziz bin Habtour =

Yemeni politician (born 1955)

His Excellency Abdel-Aziz bin Habtour
- عبد العزيز بن حبتور
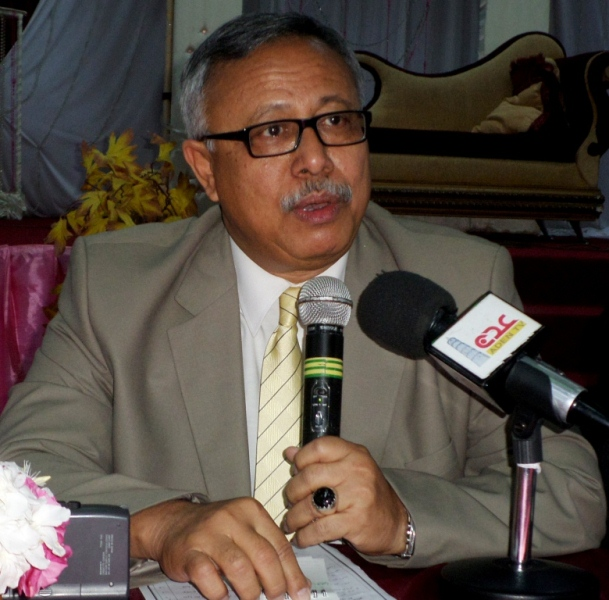
- Bin Habtour in 2014

Prime Minister of Yemen (Supreme Political Council)
- Disputed (Note: Tenure as Prime Minister of Yemen disputed by Ahmed Obaid Bin Dagher (2016–2018), Maeen Abdulmalik Saeed (2018–2024), and Ahmad Awad bin Mubarak (Feb–Aug 2024))
- In office 4 October 2016 – 10 August 2024
- President: Saleh Ali al-Sammad; Mahdi al-Mashat
- Deputy: Jalal al-Rowaishan; Akram Abdullah Attaya; Hussein Abdullah Mkabuli
- Preceded by: Talal Aklan (Acting)
- Succeeded by: Ahmed al-Rahawi

Governor of Aden Governorate
- In office 25 December 2014 – 20 July 2015
- Deputy: Nayef al-Bakri
- Preceded by: Waheed Ali Rashid
- Succeeded by: Nayef al-Bakri

Personal details
- Born: 8 August 1955 (age 71) Ghareer, Aden Protectorate
- Party: General People's Congress (Pro-Houthi faction)
- Children: 5
- Education: University of Aden; Berlin School of Economics and Law; Leipzig University

Abdel-Aziz bin Habtour (Arabic: عبد العزيز بن حبتور, romanized: ʿAbd al-ʿAzīz bin Ḥabtūr; born 8 August 1955) is a Yemeni politician who served as prime minister of Houthi-led government in Sanaa from 4 October 2016 to 10 August 2024. On Saturday, August 10, 2024, Bin Habtour was appointed a member of the Supreme Political Council. He also served as Governor of Aden during the Houthi takeover in Yemen. He is a member of the General People's Congress, sitting on its permanent committee since 1995. An ally of President Abdrabbuh Mansur Hadi, he condemned the 2014–15 Yemeni coup d'état and received the deposed leader after his flight from the Houthi-controlled capital of Sanaa on 21 February 2015. He is also a vocal opponent of the separatist movement in the former South Yemen, saying the movement is too fractured and small to achieve its goals.

In October 2016, bin Habtour was appointed prime minister in the Houthi-led parallel government.

Bin Habtour served as Deputy Minister of Education from 2001 to 2008 and subsequently as Rector of the University of Aden.

== Personal life ==
Bin Habtour was born in 1955 in the Shabwah Governorate, part of what was then the British Aden Protectorate. He earned a bachelor's degree in economics and administration from the University of Aden in 1981, a master's degree in economics from the Berlin School of Economics and Law in 1988, and a doctorate from Leipzig University in 1992. He is married with five children.

== Professional career ==
The University of Aden employed bin Habtour as a prorector from 1994 to 2001. In 2001, President Ali Abdullah Saleh named bin Habtour to serve as Deputy Minister of Education, an office he held until 2008. Afterward, he became president and rector of the University of Aden.

President Hadi appointed bin Habtour as Governor of Aden by decree on 22 December 2014. He was sworn in three days later. As Aden's new governor, he confronted the unrest created by the Houthi takeover in 2015, including a pro-separatist uprising in Aden seaport. He also met with Hadi after he fled to Aden from the capital of Sana'a.

At some point during the months-long battle for Aden in 2015, bin Habtour fled the city. In July, the Yemeni government-in-exile in Saudi Arabia announced the appointment of his former deputy, Nayef al-Bakri, as governor.

== Premiership ==
On 2 October 2016, he was appointed prime minister by the Houthis. On 4 October, he formed his cabinet. The cabinet, which includes members of the Southern Movement, is not internationally recognized.

On 28 November 2016, a new cabinet was formed. The Houthis and the General People's Congress announced a government of national salvation to be led by Habtour. He then said that the new coalition would be a vital step towards re-organizing Yemen's internal affairs and dealing with the consequences of the Saudi Arabian-led intervention in Yemen.

However, the UN Special Envoy for Yemen Ismail Ould Cheikh Ahmed said the move was "a new and unnecessary obstacle. Yemen is at a critical juncture. The actions recently taken by Ansarullah and the General People's Congress will only complicate the search for a peaceful solution. The parties must hold Yemen’s national interests above narrow partisan ambitions and take immediate steps to end political divisions and address the country’s security, humanitarian and economic challenges." He further claimed that such an action could harm peace talks.

On 13 December 2016, he accused the United Kingdom of war crimes against Yemen, by giving bombs to the Saudi-led coalition.

On 5 April 2017, he tendered his resignation as prime minister by submitting it to the Supreme Political Council, according to sources close to him. This occurred after Houthi militiamen stormed the headquarters of the General Authority for Social Security and Pensions in Sana'a, reportedly taking over the establishment and seizing funds intended for pensioners.

Political offices
Preceded by Talal Aklan; Acting	Prime Minister of Yemen; 2016–2024	Succeeded by Ahmed al-Rahawi
