= Supreme Revolutionary Committee =

Houthi interim government body in Yemen

- اللجنة الثورية (Arabic)
- Seal of the Supreme Revolutionary Committee

Overview
- Established: 6 February 2015
- Dissolved: 15 August 2016 (partial power handover)
- Polity: Houthi Yemen
- Headquarters: Sanaa

The Supreme Revolutionary Committee (Arabic: اللجنة الثورية, romanized: al-Lajnah al-Thawrīyah), also referred to as the Revolutionary Council or as the Revolutionary Committee, was an interim body in Yemen formed by the Houthis. In their 6 February 2015 "constitutional declaration" after seizing control of the Yemeni capital, and the failure of Thursday talks between the Houthis and Yemen's many political parties that were aimed at forming a government to replace Hadi and his cabinet, the group declared the committee would act as Yemen's interim authority.

The committee was given the task of forming a new 551-seat parliament, which would then select a five-member presidential council to rule the country for two years. The president of the committee was Mohammed Ali al-Houthi. On 15 August 2016, the Supreme Revolutionary Committee partially handed power to the Supreme Political Council.

== History ==
After seizing the capital in September 2014, the Houthis obtained the resignations of President Abdrabbuh Mansur Hadi, Prime Minister Khaled Bahah, and the cabinet in January 2015 and then moved to dissolve parliament and instated the Supreme Revolutionary Committee to govern their territory of Yemen on 6 February 2015. However, despite their military successes and an alleged alliance with the former ruling General People's Congress, the Houthis faced widespread domestic and international opposition to the coup and they assented to United Nations–led talks on a power-sharing deal. At least one analyst went so far as to suggest the Houthis' declaration "fizzled" in the days after it was announced, although they have Ali Abdullah Saleh's political support.

On 21 February 2015, one month after Houthi militants confined him to his residence in Sanaa, Hadi slipped out of the capital and traveled to Aden, the capital of the former People's Democratic Republic of Yemen. In a televised address from his hometown, he declared that the Houthi takeover was illegitimate and indicated he remained the constitutional president of Yemen. Hadi's ex-ministers were released by the Houthis on 16 March as a "goodwill gesture". On 21 March, Hadi officially proclaimed Aden to be the temporary capital of Yemen, until his pledged recapture of Sana'a. Within days, however, a Houthi-led military campaign wrested much of southern Yemen from Hadi's loyalists, prompting Hadi to flee his presidential palace in Aden and Saudi Arabia to launch airstrikes against Houthi positions throughout the country.

== International reactions ==
The legitimacy of the committee was rejected by several Yemeni opposition groups, including the Houthis' Sunni rivals in the Islah Party and the separatist Southern Movement, as well as the United Nations, United States, and Gulf Cooperation Council.
