= Khaled Bahah =

Yemeni politician and diplomat (born 1965)

Khaled Mahfoudh Bahah
- خالد محفوظ بحاح
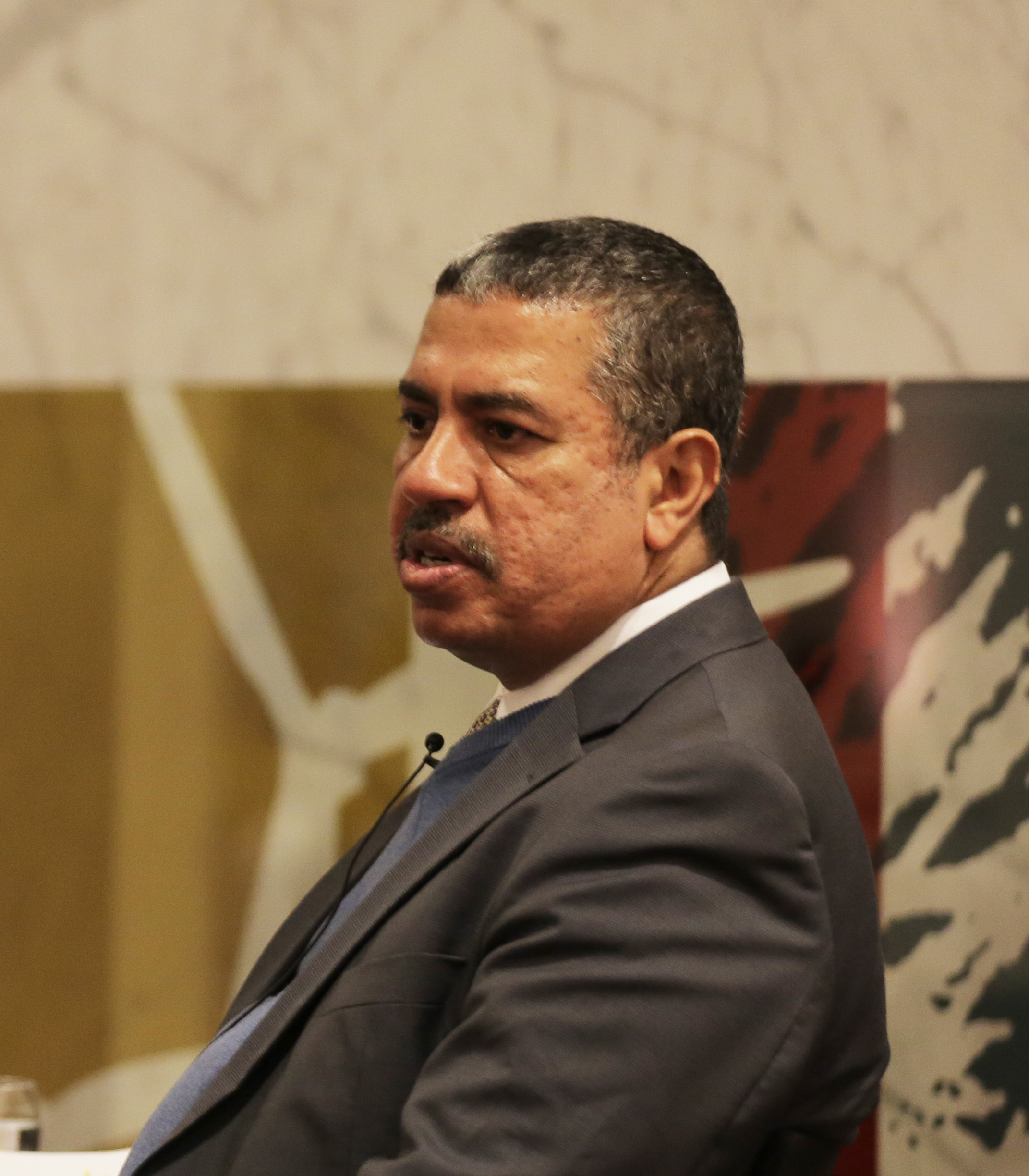
- Bahah in 2016

3rd Vice President of Yemen
- In office 13 April 2015 – 3 April 2016
- President: Abdrabbuh Mansur Hadi
- Preceded by: Abdrabbuh Mansur Hadi (2012)
- Succeeded by: Ali Mohsen al-Ahmar

8th Prime Minister of Yemen
- Disputed (Note: Tenure as Prime Minister of Yemen disputed by Talal Aklan from March 2016)
- In office 9 November 2014 – 3 April 2016
- President: Abdrabbuh Mansur Hadi
- Deputy: Ahmed Obeid bin Daghr; Abdulmalik Al-Mekhlafi; Mohamed Abdelaziz al-Jabari; Hussein Arab
- Preceded by: Abdullah Mohsen al-Akwa (Acting)
- Succeeded by: Ahmed Obeid bin Daghr (as internationally recognised PM); Talal Aklan (as Houthi-appointed PM)

Personal details
- Born: 1 January 1965 (age 61) Ad-Dees Al-Sharqiya, South Arabian Protectorate
- Party: General People's Congress (Before 2011); Independent (2011–present)
- Education: Savitribai Phule Pune University
- *Bahah's term has been disputed by Talal Aklan.

Khaled Mahfoudh Bahah (Arabic: خالد محفوظ بحاح, romanized: Ḫālid Maḥfūẓ Baḥāḥ; born 1 January 1965) is a Yemeni politician and diplomat who served as Prime Minister of Yemen between 2014 and 2016, as well as Vice President of Yemen from 2015 until he was dismissed on April 3, 2016, by the former President of Yemen Abdrabbuh Mansur Hadi.

== Life and career ==
Bahah received his BCom and MCom (1992) from Pune University in India.

In 2011, Bahah actively backed the revolution in Yemen beginning in March, demanding that President Ali Abdullah Saleh resign and avoid further bloodshed. He quit the ruling party on account of the Saleh administration's violence against its own citizens. He continued to serve as Yemeni Ambassador to Canada.

President Abdrabbuh Mansur Hadi named Bahah, then serving as Permanent Representative to the United Nations, as Prime Minister-designate on 13 October 2014, with the assent of Houthis who had seized the capital the previous month. He took office as Prime Minister on 9 November 2014. However, on 22 January 2015, after heavy fighting around the presidential compound, President Hadi and Prime Minister Bahah submitted their resignations and the cabinet dissolved, leaving Yemen without a government.

Bahah was ordered to return to work by the Houthis after the House of Representatives was reinstated and Hadi escaped to Aden in late February 2015, but he and his former ministers reportedly refused. In March 2015, Bahah was released from house arrest and he immediately left Sana'a.

While in exile in Saudi Arabia during the civil war between his supporters and the Houthis, Hadi named Bahah as vice president on 12 April 2015. An aide to Hadi expressed hope that Bahah's appointment would help bring about a "political solution" to the conflict. Le Monde described Bahah as "a man of consensus" and suggested he could step in as an acceptable successor to Hadi if the Saudi-led intervention in Yemen was successful in restoring the exiled government to power.

Bahah returned to Aden with several other ministers "to stay permanently" on 16 September 2015, according to a government spokesman, amid loyalist and coalition gains in the south.

Political offices
| Preceded by Abdullah Mohsen al-Akwa; Acting | Prime Minister of Yemen; 2014–2016 | Succeeded by Ahmed Obeid bin Daghr |
| Vacant Title last held by Abdrabbuh Mansur Hadi | Vice President of Yemen; 2015–2016 | Succeeded by Ali Mohsen al-Ahmar |
