= Mohsen al-Daeri =

Former Yemeni general (born 1965)

- محسن الداعري

Minister of Defense
- Disputed (Note: Tenure as Minister of Defense disputed by Mohamed al-Atifi)
- In office 28 July 2022 – 8 January 2026
- President: Rashad al-Alimi
- Prime Minister: Maeen Abdulmalik Saeed; Ahmad Awad bin Mubarak; Salem Saleh bin Braik
- Preceded by: Mohammed Ali Al-Maqdashi
- Succeeded by: Taher al-Aqili

Personal details
- Born: 1965 (age 60–61) Jahaf district, Dhale Governorate, South Yemen

Military service
- Allegiance: South Yemen (1985–1990); Yemen (1990–present)
- Branch/service: Yemeni Land Forces
- Years of service: 1985–2026
- Rank: Lieutenant general
- Commands: See list: 22nd Infantry Brigade (1990–1994); 15th Infantry Brigade (1994–2000); Air Defense Brigade (2003–2010); 135th Infantry Brigade (2010); 122nd Infantry Brigade (2010–2012); 14th Armored Brigade (2012–2019); Joint Operations Command (2019–2022)
- Battles/wars: Houthi insurgency; Yemeni civil war (2014–present); Marib campaign (WIA)

Mohsen Mohammed Hussein al-Daeri (Note: Arabic: محسن محمد حسين الداعري; also transliterated as Daari and Da'ari) (born 1965) is a former Yemeni military officer who served as the Minister of Defense from 2022 to 2026. Daeri joined the military of South Yemen and continued his career in unified Yemen. As commander of the 14th Armored Brigade, he fought for the internationally recognized government in the Marib campaign of the Yemeni civil war, and was wounded while on the frontlines by the Houthis in 2016. He was appointed chief of staff of the military's Joint Operations Command in 2019, and was promoted to Minister of Defense on 28 July 2022.

As defense minister, Daeri inherited the civil war amidst a ceasefire with the Houthis which lasted during his entire tenure. He suffered an assassination attempt in March 2023 allegedly perpetrated by the Houthis. He voiced criticism of the Houthis for instigating the Red Sea crisis. During the March–May 2025 United States attacks in Yemen, Daeri was involved in the planning of a potential Yemeni military offensive to defeat the Houthis on the ground and recapture their territory, through it was aborted after a ceasefire deal ended the attacks. Daeri was dismissed as Minister of Defense and referred to retirement on 8 January 2026, a month after the Southern Transitional Council had captured most of the Yemeni government's territory and days after it was recaptured in a Saudi Arabia-backed counteroffensive.

== Biography ==
=== Early life and education ===
Daeri was born in 1965 in Jahaf district of Dhale Governorate, where he received primary and secondary education. After graduating from secondary school in 1982, he enrolled in the Military Academy in Aden in 1983. There he received a bachelor's degree in military science in 1985. After studying at the University of Aden and receiving a diploma in social science in 1988, he returned to military education at the al-Thulaya Institute, where he received a certificate for an infantry battalion command course in 1993 and an infantry brigade command course in 1996. He later completed a master's degree in military science from Sanaa's Command and Staff College in 2000, and a fellowship from the Higher War College in 2008.

=== Military career ===
In 1985, Daeri received his first post in the military of South Yemen as a platoon commander in the 22nd Infantry Brigade, stationed in al-Mahrah. Recognized for his performance, he rose through the ranks of the brigade to become the commander of a company in 1987 and chief of staff of a battalion in 1989. Upon the unification of Yemen in 1990, he was appointed the operations officer of the 22nd Infantry Brigade. After the Yemeni civil war of 1994, he was transferred to the 15th Infantry Brigade in Saada Governorate, which he served in from 1994 to 2000. He then moved to Sanaa and served in First Armored Division led by General Ali Mohsen al-Ahmar. He was posted to the Air Defense Brigade, in which he served as a training officer from 2000 to 2003, and then chief of operations from thereon. In 2010, he was appointed as chief of staff of the 135th Infantry Brigade, before being transferred in the same year to the 122nd Infantry Brigade in Saada, which he commanded from 2010 to 2012.

Under President Abdrabbuh Mansour Hadi in 2012, Daeri was appointed commander of the 14th Armored Brigade in Marib, noted as one of the largest brigades of the former Republican Guard, which had been dismantled by the new administration. During the Yemeni civil war from 2014 onwards, Daeri and his unit fought for the internationally recognized government, defending Marib against a Houthi invasion. He led the coordination of pro-government forces in Marib, including the army, Popular Resistance and tribal fighters. In September 2016, during the battle of Nasr 1, he was seriously wounded in his arm by Houthi fire, forcing him to travel to Riyadh in Saudi Arabia to receive medical treatment before returning to Yemen months later. In 2019, Daeri was appointed chief of staff for the newly-established Joint Operations Command of the Ministry of Defense, and was promoted to major general.

=== Minister of Defense ===
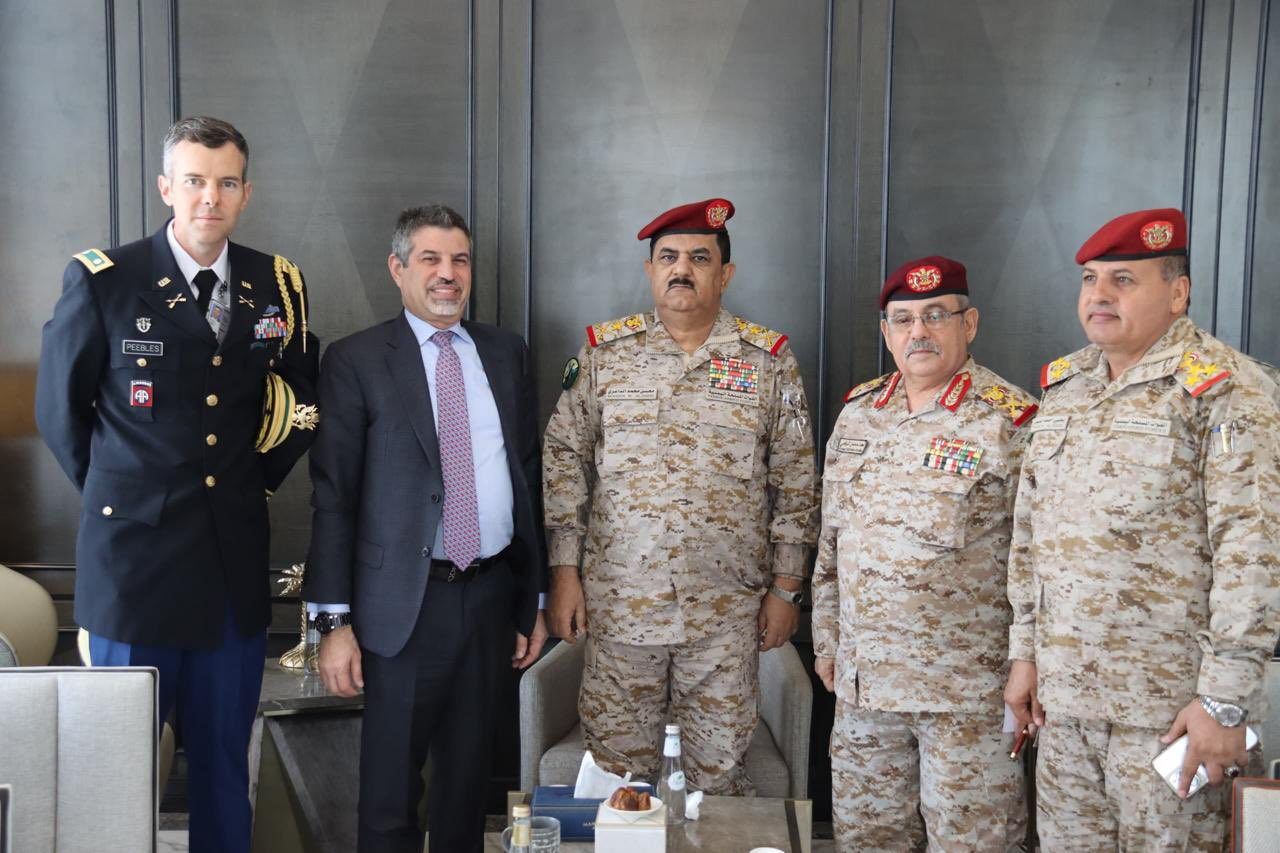
Daeri (center) with United States ambassador Steven Fagin in 2024

In a decree issued on 28 July 2022, President Rashad al-Alami appointed Daeri the Minister of Defense and promoted him to lieutenant general. He succeeded Mohammed Ali Al-Maqdashi as the ninth defense minister since 1990 and the sixth one from the south. Daeri's appointment, part of a minor reshuffling of Prime Minister Maeen Abdulmalik Saeed's cabinet, took place three months after the formation of the Presidential Leadership Council (PLC) and implementation of a United Nations-brokered ceasefire to the war. Political and military actors in the anti-Houthi bloc had generally positive relations with Daeri, noting his successes against the Houthis and refraining from interfactional conflict. Analyst Casey Coombs of the Sana'a Center for Strategic Studies characterized him as a "neutral figure who enjoys good relations with Saudi Arabia."

A wave of several assassination attempts on 25 March targeted Daeri along with military chief of staff Sagheer Hamoud Aziz and Taiz governor Nabil Shamsan. As the former two were returning from a conference in Mokha, their convoy was attacked in al-Wazi'iyah district by a loitering munition. The government blamed the Houthis for conducting the attacks.

Amidst the Red Sea crisis, Daeri communicated the Yemeni government's willingness to help secure international shipping routes from Houthi attacks in a May 2024 article from United States Central Command-sponsored magazine Unipath. He urged international backers to provide more support for the Yemeni military and to put more pressure on Iran to prevent weapons shipments from reaching the Houthis. In an interview with Asharq Al-Awsat published on 12 October, Daeri believed that the Houthis would continue with their attacks even if the Gaza war were to end, using the conflict as a distraction from their internal issues. He also reported progress in unifying PLC military forces, deepening coordination with Saudi Arabia, the United Arab Emirates, and other Arab coalition parties, concern with rising tensions in the region and the "unacceptable violence in Gaza", and the Yemeni government's preparedness for both continuing with peace negotiations with the Houthis or a resumption of the civil war.

Soon after the United States began an intensified airstrike campaign against the Houthis in March 2025, Daeri said PLC forces were prepared to respond to any offensive maneuvers by the latter, and claimed the Houthis "bear full responsibility for the recent escalation". He later told journalist Jonathan Spyer that the US did not coordinate with the Yemeni government at all during the operation, and that he and other officials were surprised by the ceasefire reached between the US and the Houthis in May. He revealed that amid the campaign, the Yemeni government and Southern Transitional Council president Aydarus al-Zubaydi had planned an offensive backed by international powers to defeat the Houthis. He lamented the inability of the government to take advantage of the US attacks, but was content with the decision "because the US was going to abandon us."

Daeri remained in Aden as STC forces conducted an offensive in December 2025 which captured the government-held Hadhramaut and al-Mahrah governorates. He chaired an emergency meeting between military officials on 31 December which discussed the events and urged a careful response to prevent further infighting within the PLC. A government counteroffensive backed by the Saudi-led coalition recaptured the two governorates and the rest of the STC's territory in January 2026. On 8 January, a decree issued by Yemeni president Rashad al-Alimi proclaimed the dismissal of Daeri as Minister of Defense and referred him to retirement. Political and military analysts believed Daeri's dismissal was due to his failure to coordinate a response to the STC offensive. It may have also been due him expressing support for the STC and al-Zubaydi after the offensive, diverging from the "consensus policy" of the PLC. HIs dismissal "sparked widespread political reactions across Yemen" according to Yemen Online, with commentators warning that it could further inflame tensions within the PLC.

=== Alleged detention in Saudi Arabia ===
Accompanying a delegation of more than 50 officials from the STC, Daeri departed from Aden to Riyadh on 7 January, just before the government counteroffensive. An anonymous source in Daeri's office told Agence France-Presse on 9 January that he along with others in the delegation were being detained at the Saudi Ministry of Defense complex, and that his family had been unable to contact him since he left Aden.
