= National Defense Council =

National Defense Council may refer to:

- National Defence Council (East Germany)
- National Defence Council (Estonia)
- National Defence Council (Nigeria)
- National Defense Council (Brazil)
- National Defense Council (Indonesia)
- National Defence Council (Spain)
- Supreme Council of National Defence (Romania)
- Provisional National Defence Council
- National Defence Council (Yemen)

== See also ==
- Defence Council of the United Kingdom
- Civilian control of the military in communist states
- National security council
- National Defense Commission
