= Yemen's Military Industry =

- Emblem of the Yemeni Armed Forces
- Active: 1990
- Country: Yemen
- Type: Military industry

The Armed Forces Military Industrialization Authority is a body managed by the Ministry of Defense. It is responsible for the production of a wide range of defense equipment, such as light multi-purpose vehicles, medium trucks, ammunition and electronics.

== History ==
The Military Industrialization Authority of the Armed Forces was established after the unification of Yemen on May 22, 1990, by a presidential decree to be under the Ministry of Defense and to strengthen the military institution.

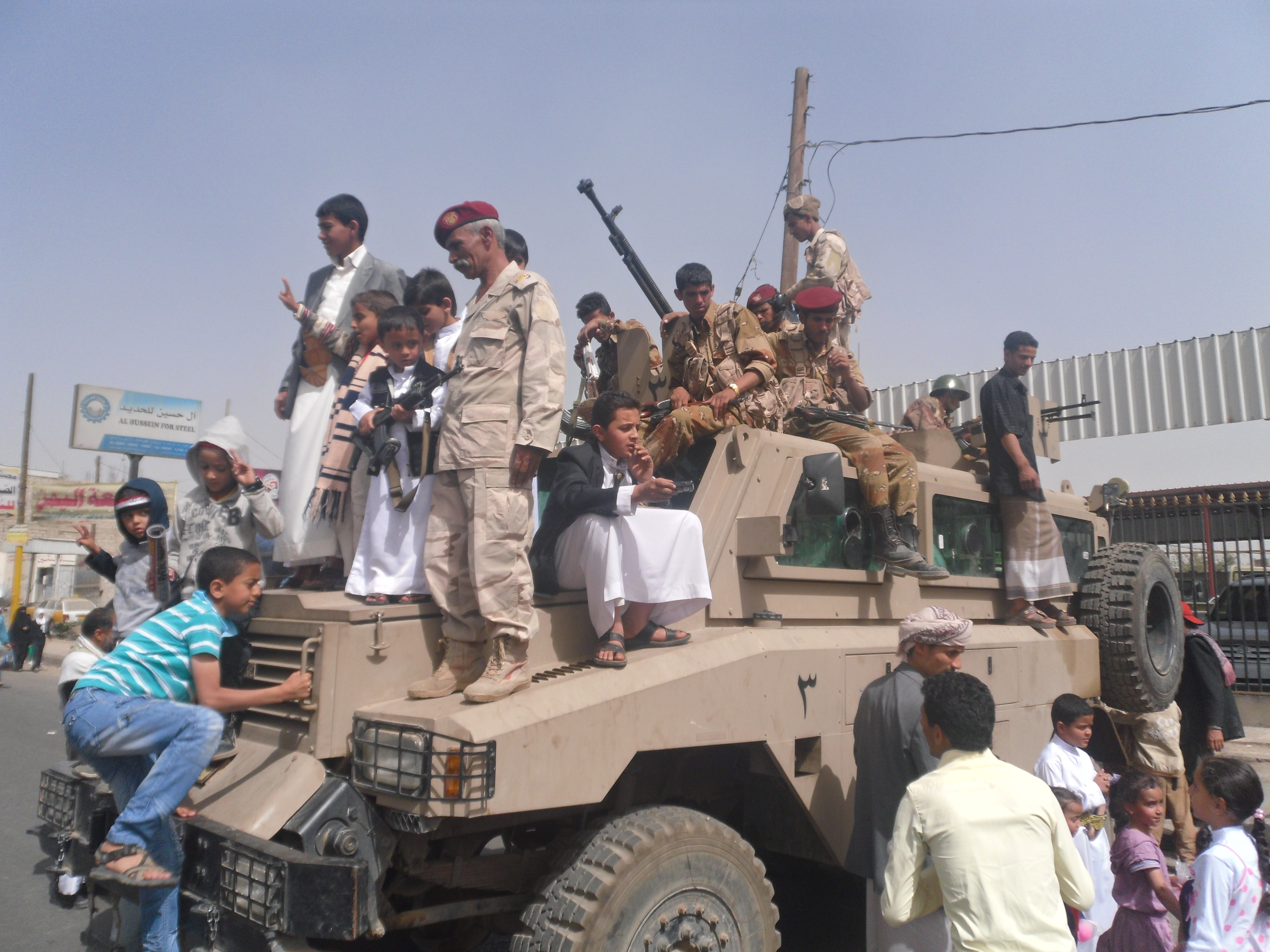
Children take pictures from a Yemeni armored vehicle, “Humaida” (local production), after the Friday prayer held by the youth of the revolution on 60th Street, Sana’a, February 1, 2012.

Combat vehicles

- (Yemen) Qutaish-1
- (Yemen) Qutaish-2
- (Yemen) Jalal 3
- (Yemen) Jalal 4
- (Yemen) Jalal 5
- (Yemen) Humaida

Logistics vehicles

- (Yemen) UAZ - 469
- (Yemen) GAZ - 2975

Small weapons

- (Yemen) Vickers machine gun (locally produced alternative)
- (Yemen) Dragunov sniper rifle (locally produced variant)
- (Yemen) Gewehr 43 (locally produced variant)
- (Yemen) Karabiner 98k (rifle) (locally produced variant)
- (Yemen) MP18 (locally produced variant)
- (Yemen) MP-40 (locally produced variant)
