= Taher al-Aqili =

Yemeni military officer and politician (born 1970)

- طاهر العقيلي
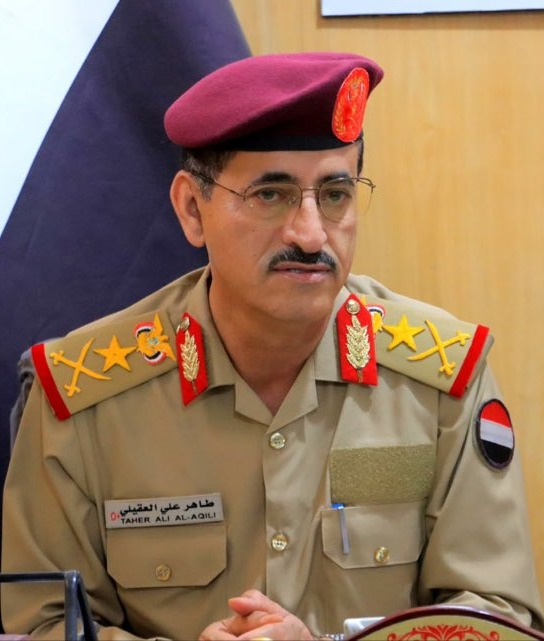
- Aqili in 2026

Minister of Defense
- Disputed (Note: Tenure as Minister of Defense disputed by Muhammad al-Atifi)
- Assumed office 6 February 2026
- President: Rashad al-Alimi
- Prime Minister: Shaya al-Zindani
- Preceded by: Mohsen al-Daeri

Chief of the General Staff of the Yemeni Armed Forces
- In office 4 September 2017 – 7 November 2018
- President: Abdrabbuh Mansour Hadi
- Preceded by: Mohammed Ali al-Maqdashi
- Succeeded by: Abdullah al-Nakha'ai

Personal details
- Born: 1970 (age 55–56) Al-Aqili, Bani Suraim district, Amran Governorate, Yemen Arab Republic

Military service
- Allegiance: Yemen Arab Republic (1984–1990); Yemen (1990–present)
- Branch/service: Yemeni Land Forces
- Years of service: 1984–present
- Rank: Lieutenant general
- Commands: 9th Infantry Brigade (2016–2017)
- Battles/wars: Yemeni civil war (2014–present)

Taher Ali Aidh al-Aqili (Note: Arabic: طاهر علي عيضة العقيلي, romanized: Ṭāhir ʿAlī ʿAyḍah al-ʿAqīlī; also transliterated as Aqeeli) (born 1970) is a Yemeni military officer and politician who has served as the Minister of Defense of the internationally recognized government of Yemen since 2026. His military career spans from 1984, when he joined the military of the Yemen Arab Republic, and has seen him serve numerous field and instructional positions in the Yemeni Armed Forces, most notably as Chief of the General Staff from 2017 to 2018 during the Yemeni civil war.

His tenure as chief of staff saw pro-government forces make notable gains in late 2017 before he was injured in a landmine explosion in January 2018. He eventually returned to his duties and continued to serve until being reappointed to a military advisorship role in November, and later being named deputy head of a Presidential Leadership Council-affiliated security committee in 2022. He was named the Minister of Defense under the cabinet of Prime Minister Shaya al-Zindani.

== Biography ==
=== Early career and education ===
Aqili was born in 1970 in the village of al-Aqili in Bani Suraim district, Amran Governorate, then part of North Yemen. He is a follower of the Zaydi branch of Shia Islam. He grew up in a traditional environment and joined the military at a young age in 1984.

He pursued extensive military education in Yemen and abroad, particularly in the fields of leadership, planning and operations management. His first post came as part of a course with the artillery corps of the Saudi Arabian military in 1985, in which he operated a 105mm howitzer. He completed a bachelor's degree in military science in 1992, obtained diplomas in negotiation and crisis management as well as surface-to-air missile technology, completed a battalion commander course at the Higher Military Academy in Sanaa in 2001, received a master's degree in military science from the Command and Staff College in 2004, and later a PhD in strategic studies and national philosophy. He also studied at institutions in Sudan, completing a master's degree in strategic studies from Karary University as well as a fellowship at the National Defense College in 2014.

As an officer in the Yemeni Armed Forces, Aqili held several instructional roles such as serving as a faculty member at the Higher Military Academy, head of a department at the Command and Staff College, and a senior instructor in the Air Defense Wing at the Command and Staff College. He progressed through a variety of ranks as commander of an air defense missile company, battalion operations officer, battalion chief of staff, and battalion commander. In 2016, he was appointed the commander of the 9th Infantry Brigade in the 6th Military Region based in al-Jawf Governorate. Aden al-Ghad reports that he played a prominent field role for military forces of the internationally recognized government during the Yemeni civil war, particularly for the campaigns in al-Jawf, Marib and Saada governorates.

=== Chief of the General Staff ===
President Abdrabbuh Mansour Hadi appointed Aqili the Chief of the General Staff of the Yemeni Armed Forces and promoted him to the rank of major general on 4 September 2017. He replaced Mohammed Ali al-Maqdashi, who had held the post for the previous two years. According to Al Jazeera Arabic, at that point in time the chief of staff was the third most-important leader in the government after the president and vice president due to the absence of the defense minister, Mahmoud al-Subaihi, who had been detained by the Houthis since 2015. Aqili was characterized as a close ally of Vice President Ali Mohsen al-Ahmar. Local analysts believed his appointment was meant to secure more influence in the powerful Hashid tribe and signalled interest for an offensive in the north, particularly in Arhab where the Hashid were based and Aqili himself was born.

In the aftermath of clashes in Sanaa in December 2017 which led to the killing of former president Ali Abdullah Saleh, the military under Aqili began making significant gains as pro-Saleh forces abandoned the Houthis. The Economist reported on 3 January 2018 that Aqili had declared breakthroughs in five fronts of the war, including gains in Bayhan district which reconnected his headquarters in Marib to the south, an advancing offensive towards al-Hudaydah, and the securing of territory in the mountainous northern areas of al-Jawf. Despite this, Aqili did not predict an easy forthcoming victory against the Houthis and complained of a lack of heavy weaponry for his forces and delayed salary payments.

As he was touring the frontlines of Khabb wa ash Sha'af district in al-Jawf on 5 January, most of which had been captured by government forces a month prior, Aqili was injured by a landmine explosion. It occurred during the afternoon in the village of al-Mahashimah as a vehicle with him and several other officials drove over the landmine. Everyone in the vehicle was unharmed except for Aqili, who suffered a minor leg fracture and bruises and was promptly transferred to Saudi Arabia to receive medical care. Chief of staff responsibilities were temporarily allocated to Adel al-Qamiri, the inspector general of the Ministry of Defense.

Speaking to Asharq Al-Awsat on 3 February while at the Riyadh Military Hospital, Aqili praised the Saudi-led coalition for its role in defusing clashes in Aden between the government and the Southern Transitional Council (STC) during his absence. He eventually returned to his duties on 13 July.

A meeting between Aqili and a delegation from United States Central Command led by commander Joseph Votel was held in Aden on 5 September. It was Votel's first official visit to Yemen since the start of the civil war. They discussed war efforts and further support for the Yemeni military. An internal source claimed that the US was interested in training Yemeni special forces for counterterrorism endeavors and the Yemeni Coast Guard to secure the Bab-el-Mandeb. Former US ambassador Stephen Seche interpreted the meeting and potential support for the Coast Guard as a warning sign to Iran for its continued support for the Houthis, often through maritime smuggling.

=== Military advisorship and committee ===
As part of a shuffle of security officials which included the naming of a new defense minister, Aqili was relieved of his position as chief of staff and replaced by Abdullah al-Nakha'ai on 7 November 2018. Asharq al-Awsat cited his injuries earlier in January as a potential factor in his replacement as it "likely made it difficult for him to continue in field work." Aqili was appointed a military advisor to the president. In May 2022, a month after Hadi transferred his power to the Presidential Leadership Council (PLC), the Supreme Military and Security Committee was formed with Aqili serving as its deputy leader. The 59-member committee was tasked with overseeing the reorganization of pro-government forces and preventing any further conflict between them.

=== Minister of Defense ===
The PLC issued a decree on 6 February 2026 stipulating the formation of a new government. Under Prime Minister Shaya al-Zindani, Aqili was set to take the position of Minister of Defense in the new cabinet. He was sworn in on 9 February, becoming the tenth Minister of Defense of Yemen since 1990 and the fourth from a northern governorate. He was promoted to the rank of lieutenant general on 11 February. The STC, which had been dissolved following a Saudi-backed Yemeni offensive earlier in the year, declared its opposition to the new cabinet and demanded more southern representation. The group particularly demanded that Aqili be replaced with a southerner as defense minister, and warned that he should leave Aden.
