= Yemeni Border Guard Forces =

Yemeni army military unit

- قوات حرس الحدود اليمنية
- Active: 1990
- Country: Yemen
- Branch: Yemeni Armed Forces

The Yemeni Border Guard Forces (Arabic: قوات حرس الحدود اليمنية) is a major formation of the Yemeni Armed Forces, administratively and operationally subordinate to the Yemeni Ministry of Defense. It consists of several brigades located in the border governorates, including the 11th Border Guard Brigade in Hadhramaut Governorate, the 2nd Border Guard Brigade in Hajjah Governorate, and the 117th Border Guard Brigade in Saada Governorate.

These forces are responsible for the land borders with Saudi Arabia and Oman. However, they suffer from weak resources and a lengthy border of 2,000 kilometers. This border encompasses the Rub' al-Khali desert in Al Mahrah, Hadhramaut, and Al Jawf, as well as mountainous areas such as Sa'dah and Hajjah. Yemen and Saudi Arabia complain that the border has become a gateway for drug, arms, and unidentified traffickers.

== Organizational Structure ==
The Border Guard Forces consist of the following:

- Border Guard Command
- Border Guard Units

== See also ==
- Houthis
