= Abdullah al-Nakha'ai =

Yemeni general| Yemeni politician

Abdullah Salem al-Nakha'ai

Chief of Staff of the Yemeni Army
- In office 7 November 2018 – 28 February 2020
- President: Abdrabbuh Mansur Hadi
- Vice President: Ali Mohsen Saleh
- Preceded by: Taher al-Aqili
- Succeeded by: Sagheer Hamoud Aziz

Personal details
- Born: 1962 (age 63–64) Abyan governorate

Military service
- Allegiance: Yemen
- Branch/service: Yemen Army
- Rank: Major general

Abdullah Salem Ali al-Nakha'ai (born 1962) is a Yemeni military officer. On 7 November 2018, he was appointed by Abdrabbuh Mansur Hadi as chief of the Yemeni Army and promoted to the rank of major general. Previously, he was commander of the Yemeni Navy and Coastal Defence Forces (2012–2018).
