= Mohammed Ali Mohsen =

Yemeni Brigadier in the Yemeni army

Mohammed Ali Mohsen is a Yemeni Brigadier in the Yemeni army. He resigned his position as Head of the Eastern Division over the 2011 Yemeni uprising.
