= Muhammad al-Atifi =

Minister of Defence of Houthi Yemen since 2016

- محمد العاطفي
- Al-Atifi in 2025

Minister of Defense
- Disputed (Note: Tenure as Minister of Defense disputed by Taher al-Aqili of the Presidential Leadership Council)
- Assumed office 28 November 2016
- President: Mahdi al-Mashat
- Prime Minister: Abdel-Aziz bin Habtour; Ahmed al-Rahawi; Muhammad Miftah (acting)
- Preceded by: Hussein Khairan

Personal details
- Born: Muhammad Nasir Ahmad al-Atifi; 1969 (age 56–57) Al-Ahnum, North Yemen (present-day Yemen)

Military service
- Allegiance: North Yemen (1986–1990); Yemen (1990–2015); Yemen (since 2015 under Supreme Political Council)
- Branch/service: Republican Guard
- Years of service: 1986–present
- Rank: Major general
- Commands: Yemeni Army (SPC): Houthis
- Battles/wars: Yemeni Civil War (1994); Yemeni Revolution; Yemeni Civil War (2014–present); Saudi Arabian-led intervention in Yemen; 2026 Yemen offensives; Gaza war; Red Sea crisis; US–UK airstrikes on Yemen; April 2024 Iranian strikes on Israel

Muhammad Nasir Ahmad al-Atifi (Note: Arabic: محمد ناصر أحمد العاطفي, romanized: Muḥammad Nāṣir ʾAḥmad al-ʿĀṭifī) (born 1969) is a Yemeni military officer who serves as the Minister of Defence of the Houthi-led government in Yemen, a position he has held since 28 November 2016.

== Early life and education ==
Muhammad al-Atifi was born in 1969 in Al-Ahnum, then in North Yemen, into a Sunni Muslim family. He received his basic and primary education in Hajjah Governorate, and pursued his higher education in 'Amran Governorate.

He entered the Military College in Aden in 1986 and graduated with the rank of lieutenant in 1988 in the South Yemeni Army. He has a bachelor in military sciences from the Military College of Aden. He studied from War College Graduate Fellowship in 2010. Al-Atifi completed his master's in military sciences from The Command and Staff College in Sanaa, 2004. Al-Atifi further completed a Battalions Commanders Course in 1996 and Brigade Commanders Course in 2000 at Thulaya Military Institute, Aden.

== Military career ==
Al-Atifi served as Chief of Operations of the Air Defense Brigade, the Northwest Military Region from 2003 to 2004. He was appointed Chief of Staff of the 135th Infantry Brigade, the Northwest Military Region in 2004. He became one of the commanders of the 122nd Infantry Brigade, Saada from 2006 to 2008. He later became Commander of the 14th Armored Brigade, Marib from 2008–2013. In 2013, al-Atifi was appointed chief of the staff of the Yemeni armed forces in 2013. He was made Yemeni Defense Minister in 2016 by Houthis.

== Rumored death ==
Al-Atifi was targeted in a Israeli airstrike in August 2025, though he survived.

On 9 September 2026, amid the Yemen offensives toward the Strait of Bab al-Mandab, a Saudi-backed Yemeni government airstrike reportedly struck a gathering of Houthi officials in al-Barh, including al-Atifi. Claims of his death remain unverified.
