= Yemeni Navy =

Maritime component of the armed forces of Yemen

Yemeni Navy and Coastal Defence Forces
- القوات البحرية اليمنية والدفاع الساحلي
- Logo of the Yemeni Navy
- Active: 1990–present
- Country: Yemen
- Branch: Navy
- Type: Navy
- Role: Intelligence assessment Maritime patrol Maritime safety Maritime search and rescue Maritime security operations Minesweeping; Naval warfare
- Part of: Yemeni Armed Forces
- Naval Headquarters: Aden
- Colors: Black, white and gold
- Anniversaries: 22 May 1990
- Equipment: 2 corvette 8 Missile boat 15 patrol craft 3 Minesweeper; 5 landing craft
- Engagements: Yemeni Civil War (1994); Houthi insurgency in Yemen; Al-Qaeda insurgency in Yemen; Yemeni revolution; Yemeni civil war (2014–present); Operation Prosperity Guardian; Saudi Arabian-led intervention in Yemen; Houthi–Saudi Arabian conflict

Commanders
- Chief of Staff of the Yemeni Navy: Vice Admiral Abdullah Salim Al-Nakhei
- Chief of Staff of the Yemeni Armed Forces: Lieutenant General Sagheer Hamoud Aziz

Insignia
- Flag of the Yemeni Navy

The Yemeni Navy, officially the Yemeni Navy and Coastal Defence Forces, is the maritime component of the Yemeni Armed Forces. The navy was created in 1990 when North and South Yemen united, bringing together the two small naval forces organized since 1970 by both the Yemen Arab Republic and the People's Democratic Republic of Yemen.

The Yemeni Navy was initially a very small and virtually non-existent force, as it lacked a sufficient naval fleet and struggled to enforce the smuggling of drugs that entered Yemen by sea. Equipped mainly with light combat units and amphibious vessels of Soviet origin, the Yemeni naval forces developed as a small coastal navy dedicated to patrolling the coastline and the national exclusive economic zone.

== History ==
=== The navies of the two Yemens ===
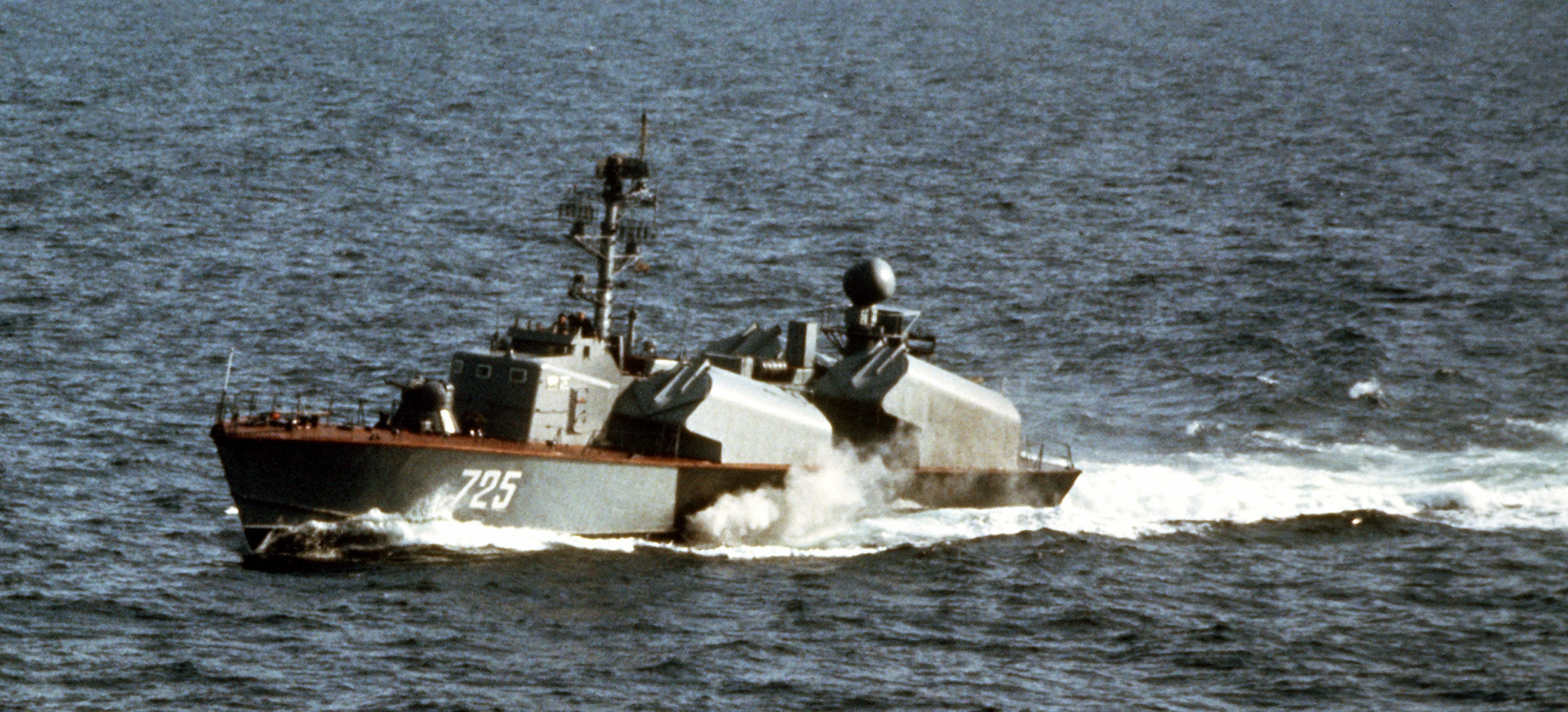
A Soviet Osa-class missile boat underway in the 1980s; the vessel represented the main strike asset of the two Yemeni navies during the Cold War

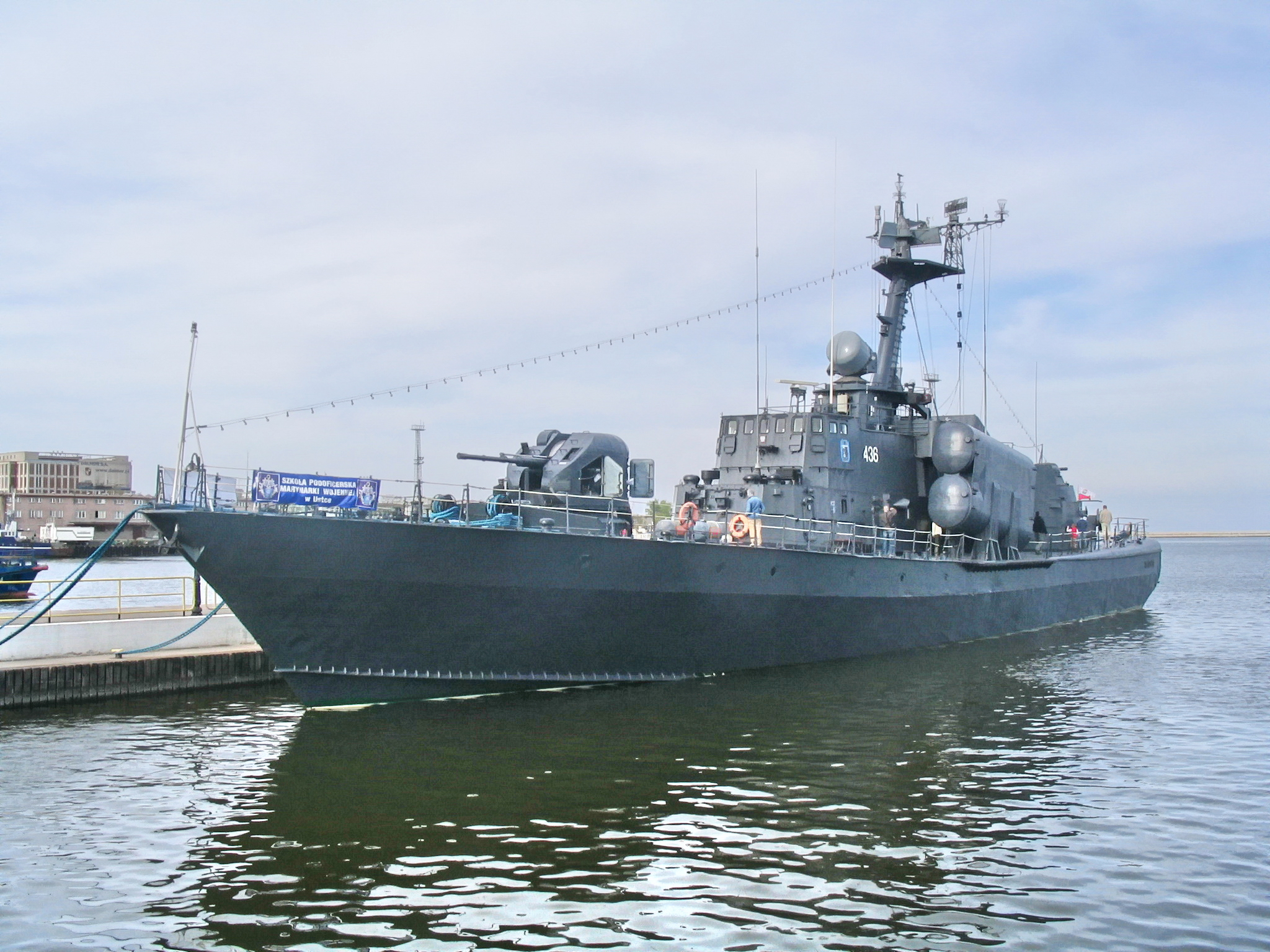
Tarantul I class

For a long period of its history, present-day Yemen was divided into two distinct entities. The northern part of the country, overlooking the Red Sea, became a target of conquest by the Ottoman Empire from the 15th century onward, although only in 1872 did Ottoman rule become sufficiently stable, at least in the coastal areas and around the capital Sana'a; the inland regions proved much more difficult to control due to the guerrilla resistance carried out by the numerous local tribes loyal to Zaydism (a branch of Shia Islam). After the collapse of the Ottoman Empire at the end of the First World War, in November 1918 warriors loyal to the Rassid imams reoccupied Sana'a, proclaiming the establishment of an independent Yemeni state, which in 1926 became the Mutawakkilite Kingdom of Yemen. Internal disputes between conservative factions loyal to tradition and reformist factions seeking greater openness to the outside world led, in 1962, to a coup d'etat aimed at deposing the reigning imam and establishing a republic; this resulted in the long and bloody North Yemen Civil War between royalists and republicans, which ended only in 1970: the imam ultimately went into exile and the Yemen Arab Republic consolidated itself as the new North Yemeni state entity.

The southern part of Yemen, facing the Indian Ocean, fell under the colonial influence of the United Kingdom following the British occupation of the strategic port of Aden in 1839, being reorganized into the two entities of the Aden Colony and the Aden Protectorate, later united in 1962 in the Federation of South Arabia. The British desire to manage the decolonisation of the territory by granting greater autonomy to the Federation while maintaining forms of control over it led to open conflict with Yemeni independence movements, which instead sought full independence: this resulted in the long guerrilla conflict fought from 1963 to 1967, ultimately ending with the complete withdrawal of British forces from the region. The Federation collapsed, while a brief internal conflict within the independence movement ended with the victory of the more Marxist-Leninist faction, which in 1970 proclaimed the establishment of the People's Democratic Republic of Yemen, the first Arab state with an explicitly communist orientation.

Both Yemeni states, with the support of their foreign allies, developed small naval forces for the protection of their extensive coastal regions. The Mutawakkilite Kingdom of Yemen, based on the alliance between the ruling imam and the region's warrior tribes, initially paid little attention to the creation of armed forces organized and equipped according to more modern standards, and its naval forces did not go beyond a few motor launches armed with machine guns; the subsequent Yemen Arab Republic instead created a more modern military establishment, initially relying on supplies of weapons and equipment from the Soviet Union. In the naval field, a small navy was activated in 1970 based on four motor torpedo boats of the P4 class, four 100-ton coastal patrol boats (converted former torpedo recovery vessels) and a pair of landing craft of the T-4 class, all second-hand units launched in the 1950s and decommissioned by the Soviet Navy; these were later joined, in 1975, by a pair of newly built Zhuk-class patrol boats. More balanced than its southern neighbor in relations with the great powers, North Yemen also established good relations with the United States, which in 1977 supplied three 90-ton coastal patrol boats to the North Yemeni Navy; however, for its later naval procurement programs the Yemen Arab Republic again turned to the Soviet Union, from which in the early 1980s it obtained two Osa-class missile boats (equipped with four launchers for P-15 anti-ship missiles), three Yevgenya-class minesweepers and two Ondatra-class landing craft.

The People's Democratic Republic of Yemen became a solid ally of the Soviet Union, to which access to the port of Aden was granted and from which came the main supplies of naval armaments. An initial South Yemeni naval force was organized in 1970 by assembling the vessels left behind locally by the British (three small Ham-class minesweepers and a pair of tugboats) together with the first Soviet-supplied units (two P-4-class motor torpedo boats, two SO-1-class submarine chasers and three T-4-class landing craft). During the 1980s about ten Osa-class fast attack craft were delivered (eight in missile boat configuration equipped with four launchers for P-15 missiles, and two in torpedo boat configuration with four torpedo tubes), four Zhuk-class patrol boats and three Yevgenya-class minesweepers; the amphibious component was particularly strengthened, with the purchase from Polish shipyards of three Polnocny-class landing ships of the Landing Ship Medium type (one of which was lost during the clashes of the brief but violent South Yemen Civil War of January 1986) and then a larger Ropucha-class landing ship of the Landing Ship Tank type, which with its 4,000 tons of displacement became the largest ship to serve in the Yemeni naval forces.

=== The 1990 merger ===
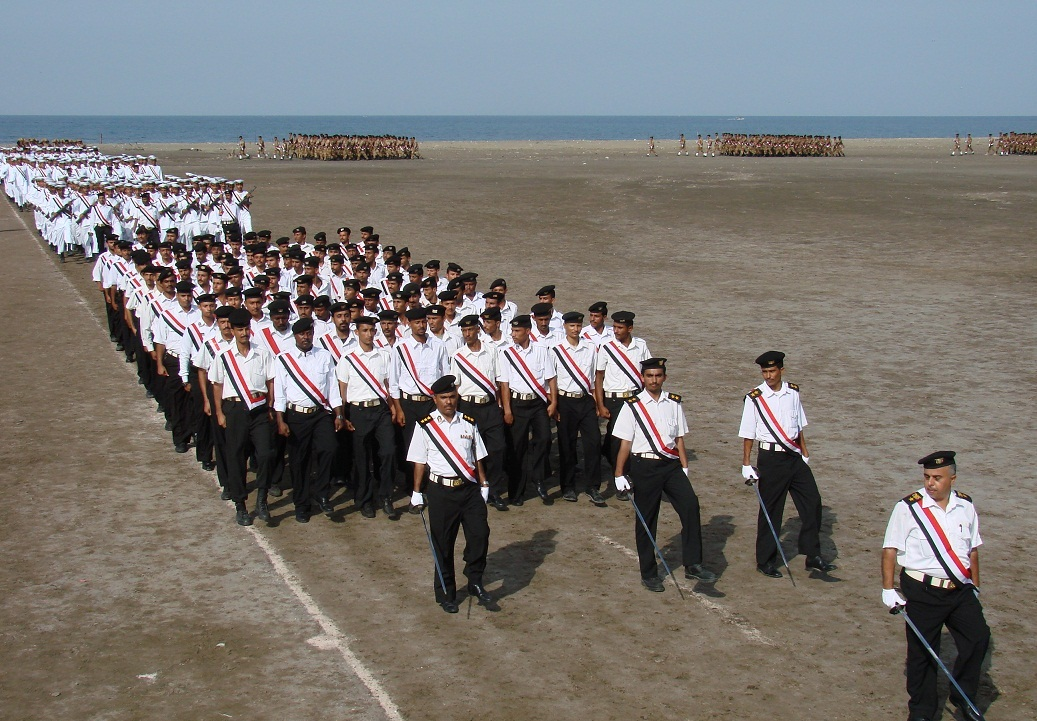
Yemeni naval personnel parading in 2011

On the Yemeni unification, the Navy of South Yemen was merged into the Navy of North Yemen. After decommissioning obsolete or no longer efficient material, the new navy could field a force of eight missile boats, two torpedo boats, about a dozen patrol boats and coastal patrol craft, six minesweepers, one LST, two LSMs, three support ships and various minor vessels; personnel strength amounted to about 2,500 active-duty servicemen, including a small marine corps of 500 men equipped with some BTR-60 armored personnel carriers. A final package of Soviet aid, delivered between 1990 and 1991 shortly after the dissolution of the Soviet Union, provided the Yemeni Navy with more militarily significant units: two corvettes of the Tarantul class, displacing 455 tons and armed with two twin launchers for P-15 anti-ship missiles, a quadruple launcher for Strela-3 surface-to-air missiles and a 76 mm gun, as well as one ocean-going minesweeper of the Natya class, also usable as an escort vessel thanks to its relatively heavy armament (two launchers for Igla surface-to-air missiles and two twin AK-230 30 mm autocannons).

In 1990, of the 11,000 sailors/seamen and 2,700 officers in the PDRY Navy, half were forced into compulsory retirement. The South Yemeni Navy also consisted of 5 Osa-class missile boats, 8 T43-class minesweepers and 1 Ropucha-class landing ship, all of which were transferred to the Yemeni Navy.

The navy's major bases are located in Aden and Hodeidah. There are also bases on Socotra, Mukalla and Perim Island, which maintain naval support equipment. There is also a naval fortress under construction in Hodeidah.

=== First Yemeni civil war (1994) ===
The merger of the two Yemens soon proved unstable, leading to the outbreak in May 1994 of the first Yemeni civil war, which lasted until the following July: heavy clashes between government forces loyal to President Saleh and South Yemeni secessionists, ultimately defeated, also involved the small naval forces, which saw half of their missile boats and both torpedo boats sunk in combat and air attacks, along with several patrol craft and auxiliary vessels; one of the Tarantul-class corvettes was also severely damaged and was eventually decommissioned in 2001. At the end of the conflict, the Yemeni naval forces found themselves in a state of deep disorganization, worsened by the need to decommission additional vessels (one minesweeper and both remaining Polnocny-class landing ships) due to a shortage of spare parts; consequently, in December 1995 the Yemeni Navy was unable to prevent the even smaller Eritrean Navy from organizing an amphibious assault to seize the Hanish Islands archipelago, disputed between Yemen and Eritrea.

In the second half of the 1990s Yemen launched a modest procurement program to reinforce its weakened naval forces. In 1995 three Type 021 missile boats were purchased from China, essentially a local copy of the Soviet Osa armed with four launchers for C-802 missiles; between 1996 and 1997 six modern carbon-hulled patrol boats were obtained from French shipyards, while in 2001 Poland delivered three newly built light landing craft followed a year later by the LST-type amphibious ship Bilqis, displacing 1,410 tons and equipped with a helicopter flight deck, which replaced the aging Ropucha-class LST slated for retirement. Between 2004 and 2005 ten small 120-ton patrol boats armed with a twin 25 mm autocannon mount were acquired from Australian shipyards, while between 2006 and 2008 a modern coastal surveillance network was activated through the purchase of radar equipment of Italian origin.

=== Hanish Islands conflict ===
During the Hanish Islands conflict, Yemen prepared its navy for an assault on the Hanish Islands and on Eritrea. Eritrea accidentally destroyed a Russian ship, thinking it was a Yemeni ship. The invasion, however, never happened since Eritrea made agreements with Yemen which involved Eritrea taking over the islands. Yemen, however, later took over Zuqar Island, which created further tensions with the Eritrean government but did not lead to another war.

=== Second Yemeni Civil War ===
The wave of protests that shook the Arab world in the early 2010s (the so-called "Arab Spring") also affected Yemen, where President Saleh had to confront widespread street protests that ultimately led to his removal from office in February 2012. This opened a prolonged period of internal instability, culminating in September 2014 in the outbreak of a new Yemeni civil war: the forces of the Shiite armed movement of the Houthis, backed by Iran, together with militias led by the ousted former president Saleh, seized control of the capital Sana'a and the northern part of the country, while government forces loyal to the new president Abdrabbuh Mansur Hadi retained control of the south. Various regional actors soon became involved in the conflict: Saudi Arabia took the lead of an international coalition of Arab states and intervened militarily in support of the government, while Iran began backing the Houthi militias through the supply of weapons and equipment.

Assessing the actual operational status of the Yemeni naval forces after the outbreak of the new civil war is very difficult. At least some elements of the Navy are known to have sided with the Houthi-dominated Supreme Revolutionary Committee and the loyalists of former President Ali Abdullah Saleh. About two thirds of Yemen's regular armed forces defected in favor of the Houthis, including the crews of the three Chinese-built Type 021 missile boats; the Houthis may also have reactivated two Osa-class missile boats and a pair of Soviet-era minesweepers that had previously been decommissioned.

Some of these forces may have been sunk in air strikes by the Arab coalition, although their missile launchers were recovered for use on land. Several Yemeni naval units were sunk during heavy fighting in Aden in 2015, including much of the remaining combat fleet and at least one landing craft operated by pro-Houthi forces. The Yemeni Navy issued a statement in October 2016 that any Saudi ships intruding in Yemen's territorial waters would be destroyed. The Yemeni Navy reportedly attacked two Saudi warships and the Emirati HSV-2 Swift off the Red Sea coast. Because of this, the Royal Saudi Air Force attacked the naval base at Al Hudaydah and destroyed two of Yemen's three Chinese-made fast missile craft. The Yemeni Navy, allegedly supported by Iranian advisors, repaired and smuggled Noor anti-ship cruise missiles and their launchers and coupled them with maritime radars and they were used to target coalition ships. The Noor missile or the original C-802 were named "Al Mandab-1", claiming it as an original Yemeni design and production. The Saudi tanker ship Boraida was targeted without reporting damage. The Houthis made extensive use of Chinese-made C-802 anti-ship missiles recovered from sunken vessels (or Iranian Noor missiles, a local copy of the C-802, smuggled into the country) to carry out attacks against military or civilian ships off the Yemeni coast. Many of these attacks, despite Houthi claims, failed to hit their targets, but on 1 October 2016 the catamaran HSV-2 Swift, operated by the armed forces of the United Arab Emirates, was struck by a C-802 missile while sailing in the Bab el-Mandeb strait, suffering severe damage. In October 2016, other Houthi missile attacks targeted, without hitting them, United States Navy vessels deployed off the Yemeni coast and patrolling the area to ensure the protection of merchant shipping and to support their Saudi allies: Yemeni forces fired about a dozen cruise missiles at them on three different days. In response, the U.S. destroyer USS Nitze (DDG-94) launched five BGM-109 Tomahawk cruise missiles and destroyed three Yemeni coastal maritime radar sites operated by the Houthis, leading to a reduction in rebel missile attacks. The Saudi Air Force also flew airstrikes and destroyed another Yemeni Radar station. Since then, lacking shore-based battery radars, the Yemeni Navy begun deploying speedboats and the remaining fast missile craft to approximately track Saudi coalition shipping. The Houthis assembled a flotilla of light craft and armed speedboats for operations in coastal waters, including civilian vessels and coast guard boats converted to military use. An explosive-laden speedboat was used by the Houthis in a suicide attack that, on 30 January 2017, damaged the Saudi frigate Al Madinah in the waters of the Red Sea off Yemen's western coast.

The status of the naval forces remaining under the control of the Yemeni government is equally difficult to assess: at least one of their units was lost after striking a naval mine in the Bab el-Mandeb strait in March 2017, prompting government forces to undertake, together with their Arab allies, a mine-clearing campaign in the strait using some of the surviving minesweepers.

== Naval equipment ==
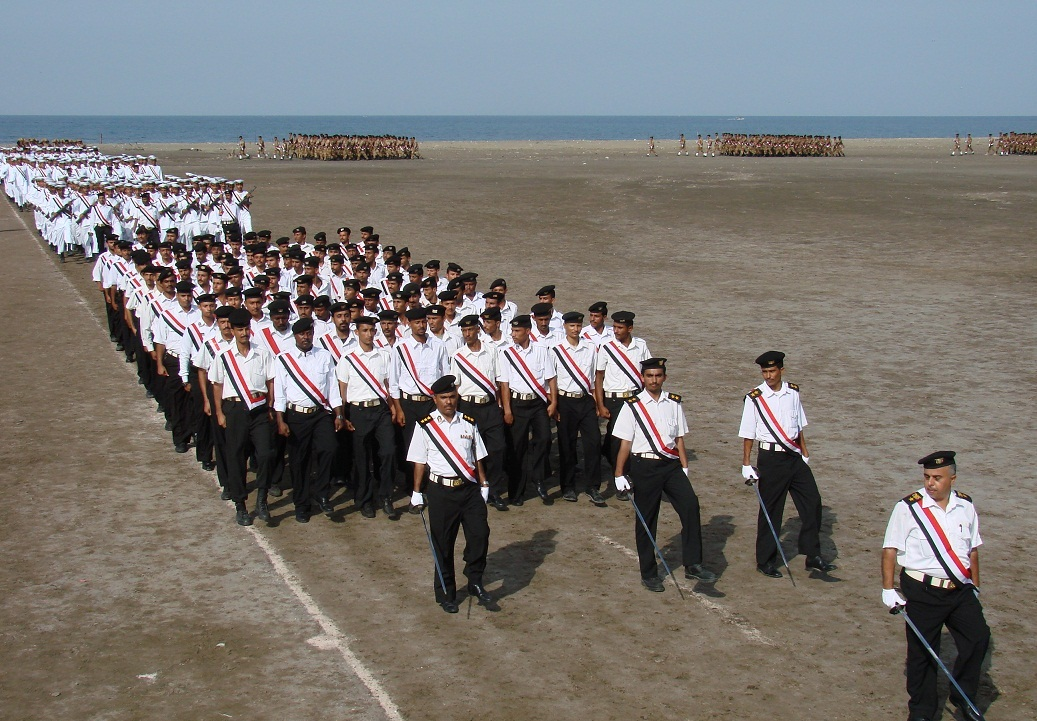
Yemeni Navy

The Yemeni Navy possesses one Tarantul I-class corvette, but it is currently out of commission. Their 8 Osa-class missile boats are also currently out of commission.

Class	Type	Ships	Origin	Quantity	Status
Fast attack craft
Sana'a	Patrol craft		United States	Unknown	Active
Minesweeper
Natya	Minesweeper	no. 201	Soviet Union	1	Non-Commissioned
Yevgenya	Minesweeper		Soviet Union	5	Active
Landing craft
Saba class	Landing craft	Saba		4	Active
Saba class	Landing craft	Abdulkori		4	Active
Saba class	Landing craft	Himyer		4	Active

== See also ==
- Military of Yemen
- List of equipment of the Yemeni Army

== Bibliography ==
- Da Frè, Giuliano (2022). Almanacco navale del XXI secolo. Odoya. ISBN 978-88-6288-759-5.
