= Aden al-Ghad =

Yemeni daily newspaper

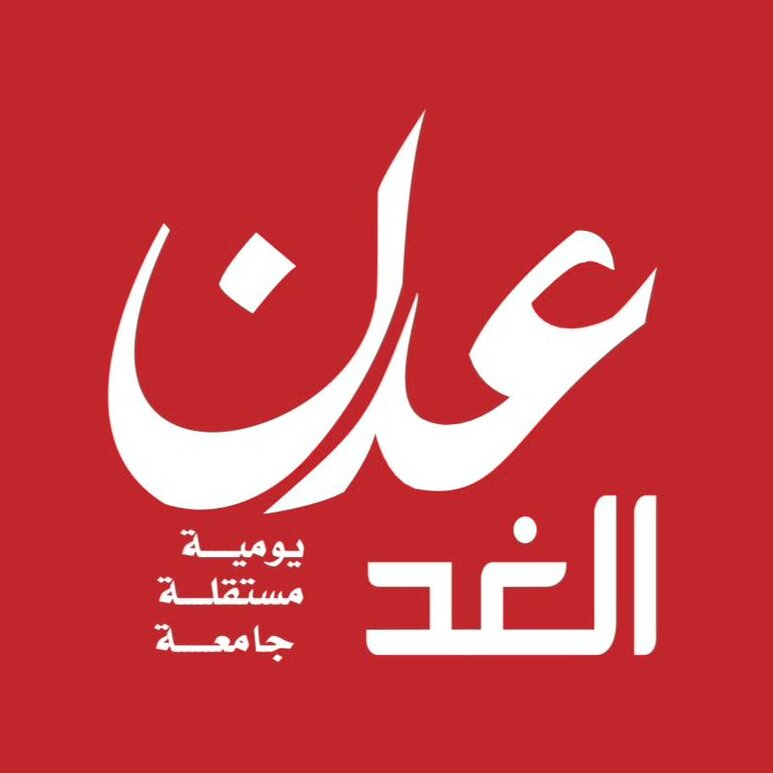
- Type: Daily newspaper
- Owner: Aden al-Ghad Media Foundation
- Editor-in-chief: Fatehi Bin Lazreq
- Founded: 10 December 2010
- Language: Arabic
- Headquarters: Aden
- Country: Yemen
- Circulation: 40,000 (as of 2014)
- Website: www.adngad.net

Aden al-Ghad (Note: Arabic: عدن الغد, lit. 'Aden of Tomorrow') is an Arabic newspaper based in Aden. Founded as a news website in 2010 by Fatehi Bin Lazreq, it established itself as a major newspaper in southern Yemen, launching a printed weekly version in 2012 which was later to a daily, as well as a radio station in 2024. Aden al-Ghad focuses on current affairs in Aden and Yemen, attracting attention for its reporting on corruption and human rights abuses. It is linked to the Southern Movement but has been described as independent.

== History ==
Born in Abyan Governorate, Fatehi Bin Lazreq, the founder of Aden al-Ghad, had been interested in journalism since his childhood, claiming to have written for the newspaper Al-Ayyam at the age of 13. While studying law, he wrote about issues in the south on the internet forum Youth of Yemen. After graduating in 2006 he landed a job at a timber company in Al-Hudaydah Governorate while moonlighting as a journalist. Upon the arrest of several leaders of the Southern Movement in 2008, he returned to Aden to pursue journalism full-time, publishing a small newspaper focused on the southern cause before joining the editorial board of Al-Ayyam, until government pressure forced its closure in 2010.

Lobbying Southern Movement leader Mohammed Ali Ahmed, Bin Lazreq received 100,000 riyals to fund a private newspaper focused on the southern cause. During his time at Al-Ayyam, he envisioned this newspaper with the name Aden al-Ghad, meaning "Aden of tomorrow", to symbolize a better future for the south. Alongside web designer Mu'ad Shaibani and writer Yasir Abdel Baqi, the Aden al-Ghad website was officially launched on 10 December 2010.

Bin Lazreq said Aden al-Ghad witnessed significant growth in 2011 during the Yemeni revolution, taking a stance against the regime of Ali Abdullah Saleh as well as the Islamist opposition party Islah. In order to further differentiate it from other newspapers in the south, Bin Lazreq decided to establish a printed version of the newspaper published in a weekly format. With support from opposition figure Abdurrahman Ali Al-Jifri and Enma Company owner Hussein al-Hamami, the first physical issue of Aden al-Ghad was published on 1 January 2012 from the government-owned 14 October Printing and Publishing house. Owing to its popularity, the newspaper was converted to a daily format starting on 17 June. By 2014, it claimed to have a circulation of up to 40,000, but with little circulation in Sanaa.

Upon attempting to print the Aden al-Ghad Sunday edition on 23 February 2014, staff was blocked from doing so by officials at 14 October Printing and Publishing, who were reportedly implementing government orders to not allow publishing without a license from the Ministry of Information. The newspaper said it had a valid license and claimed the blocking was part of a campaign suppression campaign due to its reporting. Southern leaders condemned the move and hundreds of protestors gathered outside the publishing house. The physical newspaper returned on 1 March from a privately-owned printing house. Aden al-Ghad maintained its popularity in the south by 2015 amidst the civil war, reporting on the conflict and human rights abuses. Aden al-Ghad Radio 89.9, a "public commercial political news radio station" hosted by Bin Lazreq, was launched in 2024.

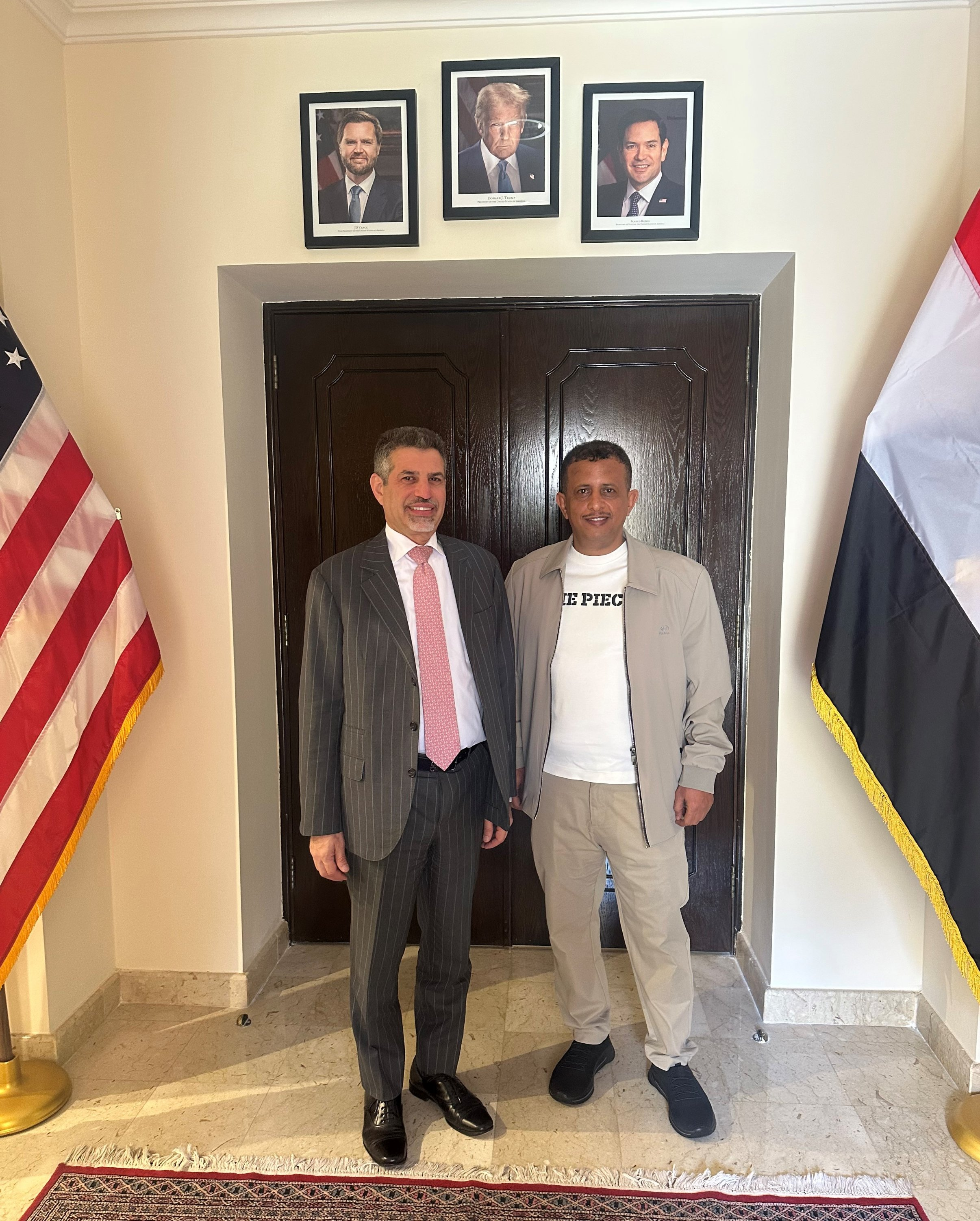
Bin Lazreq (right) with Steven Fagin (left), the ambassador of the United States to Yemen, after Aden al-Ghad offices were raided in 2026

Security forces from the Southern Transitional Council raided the offices of Aden al-Ghad on 27 September 2025. Bin Lazreq was briefly detained as the STC attempted to close the newspaper for "registration issues", although Bin Lazreq claimed it was retribution for their reporting on financial corruption. Aden al-Ghad's headquarters was again raided on 1 February 2026 by gunmen once affiliated with STC, which was dissolved a month prior after a government offensive. Looting and damages were reported along with injuries to two staff members. Bin Lazreq told Al Hadath the STC had targeted them because of their continued reporting on corruption within the organization.

== Organization and content ==
Based in Aden, the Aden Al-Ghad Media Foundation maintains a news website, a print newspaper, a radio station and a human rights foundation. Its media is published in Arabic. The printed newspaper is published in a daily format excluding Friday. The foundation has also published other newspapers including Aden Cultural Newspaper, Al-Youm Al-Awal and Aden Al-Ghad Sports.

The newspaper covers current affairs in Aden and Yemen at large, but focuses particularly on southern Yemen. Along with Al-Ayyam, Aden al-Ghad is "well-known in Aden as a major source of accountability news." Through Aden al-Ghad and his personal Facebook page with 600,000 followers as of 2024, Bin Lazreq has exposed corruption and human rights abuses, and has managed to secure the release of prisoners as well as financial support for individuals and institutions in need. In order to verify cases as legitimate, Bin Lazreq does not investigate complaints "unless the person submits it in person and provides all necessary evidence, documentation and witnesses to support their case".

By 2013, the newspaper was "known for its critical reporting of the federal government based in the north." It has been characterized as supportive of the government led by Abdrabbuh Mansour Hadi and critical of the Houthis in the context of the civil war since 2014. Reuters reported that Aden al-Ghad "reflects the views of" the Southern Movement. It has been labeled "pro-South", but has reported critically on the STC. Bin Lazreq says he endorses nonpartisanship, claiming "all parties have had both setbacks and successes, and that they were all born out of the war—and will probably fade when the war ends."
