= Qutaish-2 =

Qutaish-2 (Leopard)
- Type: Armour protected vehicles
- Place of origin: Yemen

Service history
- Wars: Houthi insurgency Yemeni civil war (2014–present)

Specifications
- Crew: Eight people with their equipment, in addition to the gunner.
- Main armament: DShK
- Engine: Toyota Land Cruiser diesel engine and differentials, 6 cylinder 210hp

Qutaish-2 (Leopard) are defensive combat armour protected vehicles designed and manufactured by Yemen's Armed Forces Military Industrialization Authority.

== Users ==
- South Africa (250 units)
- Yemen
