= Mohammed Ali al-Maqdashi =

Yemeni politician (born 1962)

Mohammed Ali Al-Maqdashi
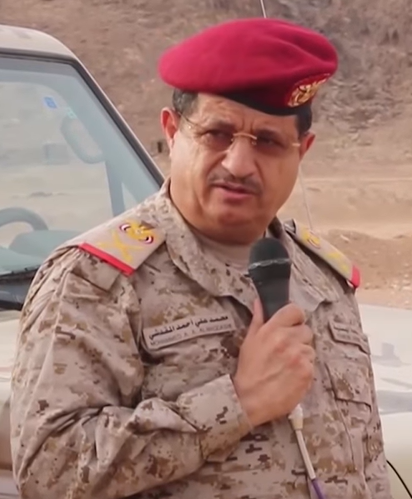

Advisor to the Yemen's Presidential Leadership Council
- Incumbent
- Assumed office 28 July 2022
- Appointed by: Rashad al-Alimi
- Prime Minister: Maeen Abdulmalik Saeed

Defense Minister
- In office 7 November 2018 – 28 July 2022
- Appointed by: Abdrabbuh Mansur Hadi
- Preceded by: Mahmoud al-Subaihi
- Succeeded by: Mohsen Mohammed Al-Daeri

Chief of the Yemeni Armed Forces Staff
- In office 3 May 2015 – 8 November 2018
- Appointed by: Abdrabbuh Mansur Hadi
- Preceded by: Hussein Khairan
- Succeeded by: Taher Al-Auqaili

Personal details
- Born: 1962 (age 63–64) Dhamar Governorate, North Yemen

Military service
- Allegiance: Yemen
- Branch/service: Yemen Army
- Rank: Lieutenant General
- Battles/wars: Yemeni Civil War (1994); Yemeni Civil War (2015–present)

Lieutenant General Mohammed Ali Al-Maqdashi (Arabic: محمد علي المقدشي; born 1962) is a Yemeni military officer. On 28 July 2022 he was appointed by Rashad Al-Alaimi as an advisor to the Yemen's Presidential Leadership Council for military and security affairs. He was previously Yemeni Minister of Defense, and a military advisor to former President Abdrabbuh Mansur Hadi. He also served as chief of staff of the Yemeni Armed Forces.

On 19 February 2020, a landmine explosion struck the motorcade of the Hadi Government Ministry of Defense in Marib leaving six bodyguards dead. Ali Al-Maqdashi survived the attack.
