= Yemeni Armed Forces =

Combined military forces of Yemen

- الْقُوَّاتُ الْمُسَلَّحَةُ الْيَّمَّنِيَّة
- Emblem of the Armed Forces of Yemen

- Flag of the Armed Forces of Yemen
- Founded: 1920; 106 years ago
- Current form: 1990; 36 years ago 2015; 11 years ago (Yemeni National Army)
- Service branches: Yemeni Army; Yemeni Navy; Yemeni Air Force; Yemeni Border Guard Forces; Strategic Reserve Forces (SPC) (PLC; until 2023); Homeland Shield Forces (PLC; since 2023); Unmanned Aviation Arm (SPC); Yemeni Rocket Force (SPC)
- Headquarters: Riyadh (PLC) / Aden (PLC) (2015–2019; since 2026); Sanaa (SPC)
- Website: yafm.net (PLC); mmy.ye (SPC)

Leadership
- Commander-in-Chief: Rashad al-Alimi (PLC); Mahdi al-Mashat (SPC) (de jure) (de facto Abdul-Malik al-Houthi)
- Prime Minister: Shaea al-Zindani (PLC); Muhammad Miftah (acting) (SPC)
- Minister of Defense: Taher al-Aqili (PLC); Muhammad al-Atifi (SPC)
- Chief of Staff: Sagheer Hamoud Aziz (PLC); Yusuf al-Madani (SPC)

Personnel
- Military age: 18
- Active personnel: 66,700

Expenditure
- Budget: $1.4 billion (2019)
- Percent of GDP: 8%

Industry
- Domestic suppliers: Yemen's Military Industry
- Foreign suppliers: PLC-affiliated: Australia; Austria; Brazil; Bulgaria; Canada; Czech Republic; France; Germany; Hungary; India; Indonesia; Italy; Japan; South Korea; Netherlands; Poland; Singapore; South Africa; Sweden; Switzerland; Taiwan; Turkey; Ukraine; United Kingdom; United States; SPC-affiliated: Belarus; Cuba; Iran; North Korea; Russia (allegedly)

Related articles
- History: Military history of Yemen: Saudi–Yemeni war; 1948 Arab–Israeli War; North Yemen civil war; Yemenite War of 1972; NDF Rebellion; Yemenite War of 1979; Yemeni civil war (1994); Hanish Islands conflict; Houthi insurgency in Yemen; South Yemen insurgency; Yemeni revolution; Yemeni civil war (2014–present); Saudi-led intervention in the Yemeni civil war; Houthi–Saudi Arabian conflict; 2024 Israeli invasion of Lebanon
- Ranks: Military ranks of Yemen

The Yemeni Armed Forces (Arabic: الْقُوَّاتُ الْمُسَلَّحَةُ الْيَّمَّنِيَّة, romanized: al-Qūwāt al-Musallaḥa al-Yamaniyya) are the military forces of the Republic of Yemen. They include the Yemeni Army (Yemeni Ground Forces and Republican Guard), Yemeni Naval Forces and Coastal Defense (including the Marines) and the Yemeni Air Forces and Air Defense (including the Air Defense Force) and the Homeland Shield Forces, for the SPC, it includes the Yemeni Army, Navy, Air Force, and the Strategic Reserve Forces & Unmanned Aviation Arm & the Rocket Force.

Since the start of the current civil war in 2014, the armed forces have been divided; at first with one side being loyalists of the former president Ali Abdullah Saleh and Houthi fighters and the other side being pro-Yemeni government forces of former president Abdrabbuh Mansour Hadi; as of 2026, between the internationally recognized Presidential Leadership Council (PLC), and the Houthi-led Supreme Political Council (SPC). to distinguish between Houthi & Yemeni forces, the internationally-recognized government of Yemen since 2015 uses the Yemeni National Army (YNA) to describe its army, while the Houthis & Saleh loyalists (2014–2017) kept the Yemeni Army identity. Per the constitution, the President of Yemen serves as the commander-in-chief. Currently, the presidency and supreme command of the armed forces is disputed between Rashad al-Alimi, Chairman/President of the PLC, and Mahdi al-Mashat, Chairman/President of the SPC. Before the civil war, the united military (1990–2014/2015) was headquartered in the country's capital, Sanaa. After the beginning of the Yemeni civil war (2014/2015–present), the pro-Houthi/SPC Yemeni Armed Forces are headquartered in the country's capital, Sanaa, and the Yemeni Armed Forces loyal to the internationally-recognized government of Yemen are headquartered in Aden between 2015 and 2019 and later since 2026, and were previously headquartered in Ma'arib from 2019 to 2026.

Already before 2014, the number of military personnel in Yemen was relatively high; in sum, Yemen had the second largest military force on the Arabian Peninsula after Saudi Arabia. In 2012, total active troops were estimated as follows: army, 66,700; navy, 7,000; and air force, 5,000. In September 2007, the government announced the reinstatement of compulsory military service. Yemen's defense budget, which in 2006 represented approximately 40 percent of the total government budget, is expected to remain high for the near term, as the military draft takes effect and internal security threats continue to escalate.

== History ==
=== Early beginnings ===
The origins of the modern-day Yemeni military can be traced back to the late 19th century when Turkish Ottomans began recruiting tribal levies to create four battalions of gendarmerie and three cavalry regiments. In 1906, the Italians recruited thousands of Yemenis and gave them military training in Italian Somaliland before sending them to Libya to fight the Senussi insurgency of 1911. Aware of the gains made by the Hashemites in the course of the Arab revolt, a combination of these forces - all of which held strong ties to various local tribes - rebelled against the Ottoman rule in Yemen during the First World War. Although nowhere near as famous as the uprising involving Thomas E. Lawrence - "Lawrence of Arabia" - the Yemen revolt led to the withdrawal of the Turkish military. After officially declaring independence from the Turkish Ottomans in 1918, Yemen was only internationally recognized in 1926. By that time, Imam Yahya kept a cadre of 300 Ottoman officers and soldiers to train his army, which - while remaining an outgrowth of the tribal levies that functioned as little more than a palace guard - was officially organized as follows:

- Special Imamate Guard: nominally a 5,000-strong unit of specially selected combatants named "Ukfa" considered absolutely loyal to the monarch;
- The Outback Army: this up to 50,000-strong force consisted of Zaidi tribesmen - infantry and cavalry - that served for one or two years, but brought their own rifles and provisions;
- The al-Army: established in 1919, this consisted of several groups of tribal levies. Each tribe included a retainer who reported on the behavior, awards, and misdeeds of members of his tribe; if a member of the tribal levy stole, or left without permission, the retainer and tribal chief compensated the imam for the loss;
- The Defensive Army: established in 1936, this was a draft of all able-bodied men - including urban Yemenis - capable of bearing arms and given six months of military training. With all members of the Defensive Army receiving periodic training for 10 years after their draft, this became a form of a reserve army.

During the early 1920s, an ammunition factory was constructed in Sanaa by a Yugoslavian (or German) and an Australian. After his army performed dismally in fierce clashes with the British and in the 1934 Saudi–Yemeni war, the Imam saw the need to modernize and expand the armed forces eventually purchasing from Italy six tanks, 2,000 rifles, four anti-aircraft artillery (AAA) pieces and some communications gear, while Iraq provided additional rifles and communications equipment. Italy also opened a flight school in Sanaa. In 1954 Imam Ahmad also established military cooperation with Egypt, and Cairo donated a total of four cannons, six heavy machine guns, 12 light machine guns and 20 rifles to Sanaa, deploying four Egyptian army officers to serve as instructors.

=== North Yemeni armed forces ===
When the Republican Government took power in a coup much of the stability and any remaining professionalism in the army was destroyed. The new government had to build a new army to fight the royalist insurgents. First training centers and recruitment offices were established in every province. The Egyptians played a remarkable role in the process of building a modern national army through serving as advisers and giving Yemeni officers the chance to study in Egyptian academies. With help from the Egyptians four full infantry brigades were formed. These consist of the Revolution brigade, the Nasr brigade, the Unity brigade and the Al Araba brigade. One problem in the young Yemeni army was a lack of strong leadership. Egyptian advisers needed to form a unified military command, so the following bodies were established:

- Army management authority
- Logistics authority
- General military armament authority
- War operations room led by Captain Abdul Latif Deifallah.

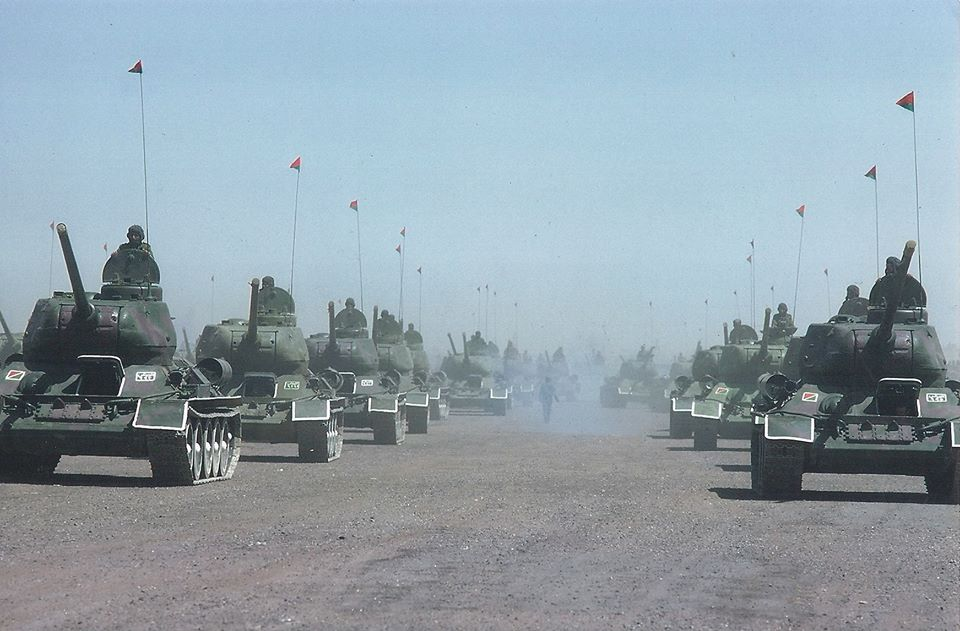
Soviet-made T-34-85 tanks on the military parade of the North Yemeni army, 1976.

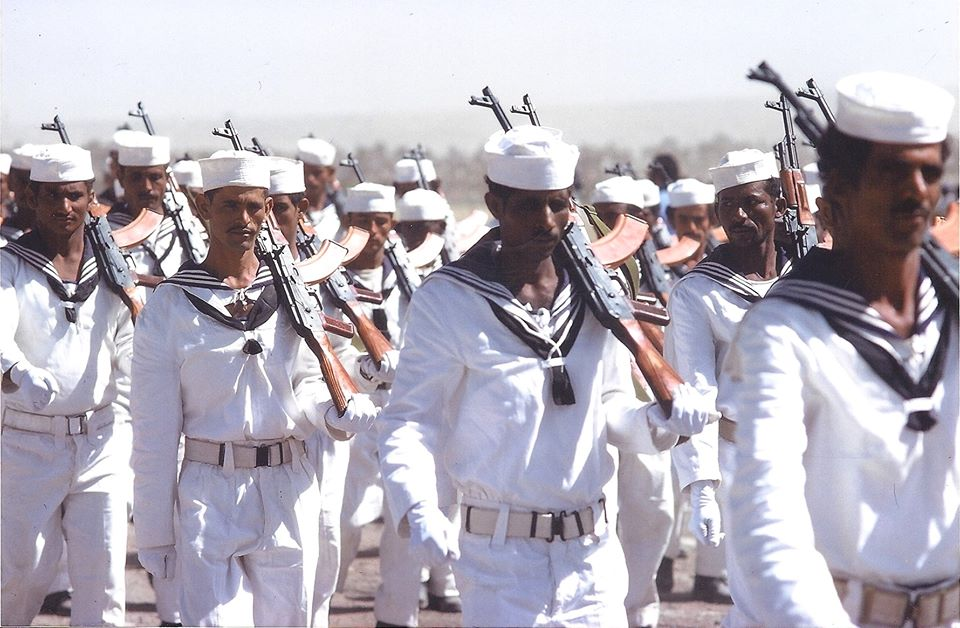
North Yemeni soldiers on parade, 1976.

Post-civil war recovery of North Yemen proved extremely problematic. Badly damaged by years of fighting, the economy was in tatters. The military ate up to 50 percent of the national budget, totalling only some £9 million, which was hopelessly insufficient for the circumstances. Controlled by the government, the military's logistical system was not only dependent on Sanaa's trust in the loyalty of local commanders, but also subject to graft and corruption. The Soviets, who wholeheartedly helped during the siege of Sanaa, proved ever more reluctant with the provision of spares and support equipment: Moscow preferred cooperation with the PRY, the government of which was ideologically closer to the USSR, and thus found little incentive in supporting the problematic Northerners. Before long, the lack of Soviet support seriously affected the combat capability of the North Yemeni military. It also had negative impacts upon the morale of the military in general, and began causing rifts between Sunni and Zaidi personnel. In an attempt to improve the situation, the commander-in-chief of the North Yemeni armed forces, colonel Hassan Al-Amri, visited Prague to request military aid. As so often before, the Czechoslovaks denied all such requests because they were certain that Yemen could not pay. Instead, Czech officials offered obsolete arms - including old rifles, sub-machine guns, anti-armour rockets and uniforms. It remains unclear whether Amri accepted this offer. By January 1971, dissent within the 30,000-strong armed forces reached a level where Amri was forced to dismiss several hundred army officers with Sunni backgrounds, apparently because they were in opposition to the government's decision for rapprochement with Saudi Arabia. Later the same year, right-wing officers began plotting a coup with the intention of imposing a military regime, while dozens of left-wing officers were arrested and accused of conspiring with possible Soviet and Iraqi support. Fearing another coup attempt, Amri then reorganised the military so that control over combat units was exercised by corps commanders for infantry, armour and artillery - irrespective of their geographic area of responsibility. He also created the General Reserve Force under the command of Colonel Ibrahim Al-Hamdi, and the Republican Guard, both of which consisted of about 7,000 troops of acknowledged loyalty to the government. Personnel-related problems persisted, nevertheless. In January 1971, a plot was uncovered - supposedly organised by Soviet advisers - under which several pilots intended to defect with their aircraft to Aden. In another attempt to improve the situation, President Iryani visited Moscow and requested additional military aid, including deliveries of MiG-17 fighter-bombers, in December 1971. However the Soviets also refused. The only improvement the North Yemeni air force experienced during this period was the expansion of Al-Daylami air base, undertaken during the same year.

=== South Yemeni armed forces ===
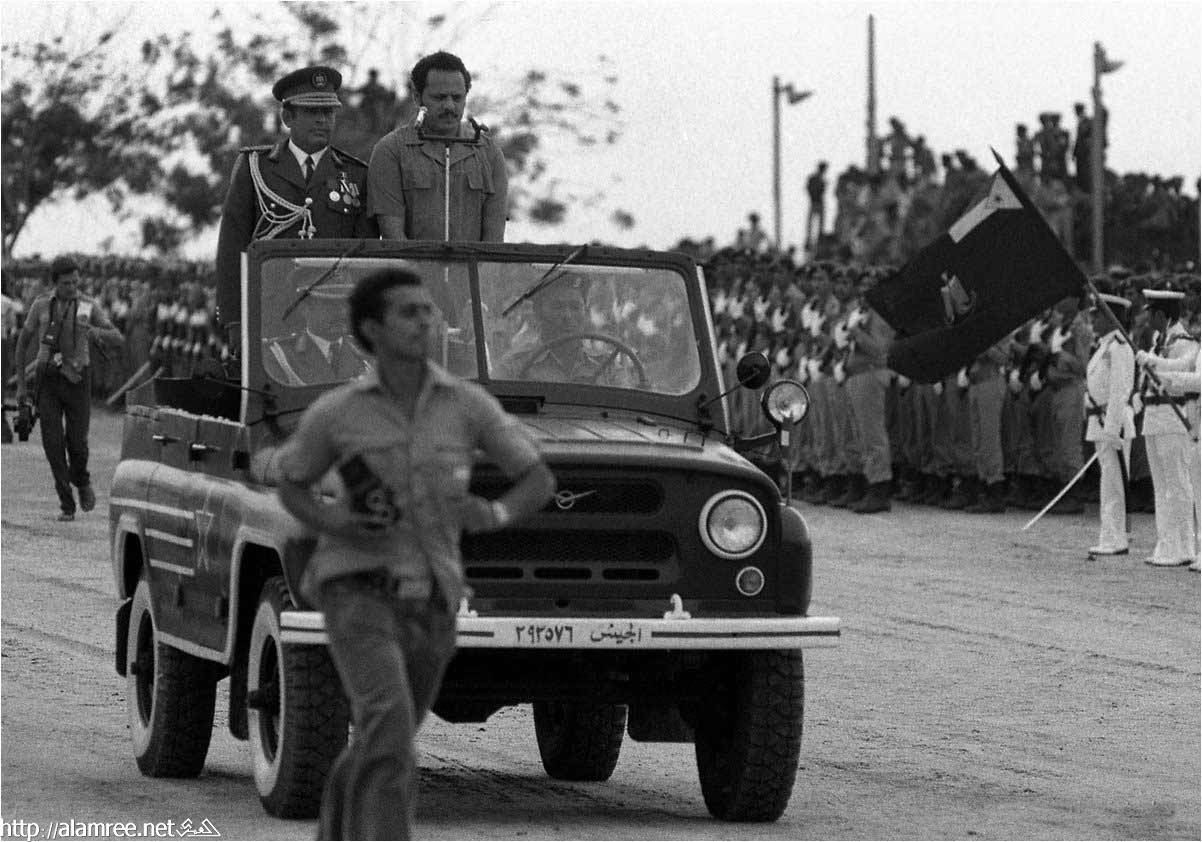
Ali Nasser Muhammad with Defense Minister Saleh Musleh Qasim inspecting the units participating in a military parade in South Yemen

The origins of the South Yemeni army can be traced back to World War I, when the 1st Yemeni battalion was formed, consisting of locally enlisted Arabs to confront Turkish troops threatening Aden. This unit was disbanded in 1925, but reformed three years later as the Aden Protectorate Levies (APL), under the control of the RAF. Between 1929 and 1939, the APL served to protect airfields and other bases, and also for garrison duties on Perim and Kamaran islands. During the Second World War, it was reinforced through the addition of an anti-aircraft unit, which in 1940 managed to shoot down an Italian bomber over Aden. In 1957, the APL was reorganised and placed under the control of the British army. Four years later, it came under the jurisdiction of the Federation of South Arabia and was officially redesignated as the FRA. By 1964, this comprised five infantry battalions, an armoured car squadron and a signal squadron. In June 1967, it was reinforced by the addition of four battalions of the Federal Guard (or National Guard) that were merged into its existing structure, and recruitment of its tenth battalion. A year later, three battalions of the Hadrami Bedouin Legion - an internal security force in the former Eastern Aden Protectorate - were integrated into the FRA. The British trained these units in mountain warfare and helicopter-supported operations, some even for urban internal security operations. Therefore, when the British hurriedly negotiated a transfer of power to the National Liberation Front (NLF) as the dominant political force in the FSA in November 1967, the new government was able to reach back upon a well-trained and organised, even if small, army.

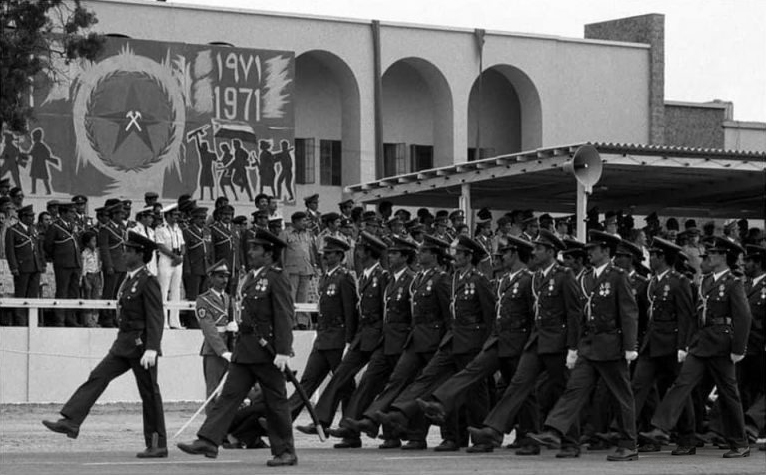
Parade of the PDRY Armed Forces in 1971

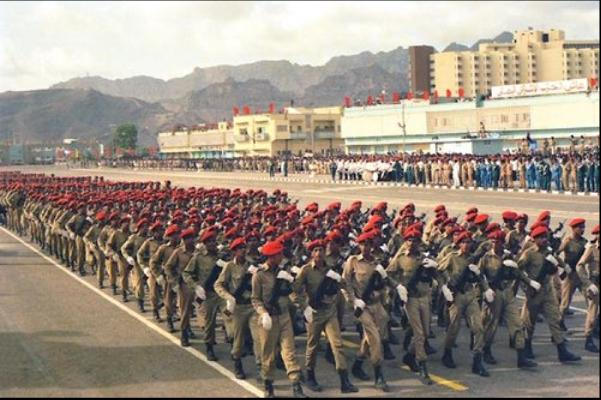
South Yemen soldier on the parade, 1980s.

In June 1969, a radical Marxist wing of the NLF gained power in Aden and on 1 December 1970, the country was renamed the People's Democratic Republic of Yemen. The Armed Forces was renamed as the People's Democratic Republic of Yemen Armed Forces. Subsequently, all political parties were amalgamated into the NLF - renamed the United National Front - or banned, while the government established very close ties to Moscow. Curious to obtain a foothold from which it could control and influence developments in the Red Sea, Arabian sea and Horn of Africa, as well as enhance its capacity to monitor US and allied activities in the Middle East and bolster its own military presence, the Soviet Union grabbed the opportunity. While officially befriending both governments in Sanaa and Aden, Moscow subsequently took over the duty of assisting the military build up of South Yemen only. In the People's Democratic Republic of Yemen, this process came forward at a more significant rate than in North Yemen - not only because of the better training local armed forces had earlier received from the British, but also because the United National Front was ideologically opposed to tribalism and did its best to eradicate it. The build-up was further bolstered by the arrival of Soviet advisors in 1968. As relations with Moscow grew ever stronger, a much larger Soviet Military Advisory Group - headquartered in Aden and commanded by a Major General - was established in early 1969. One Soviet colonel took over command of the air force while another assumed command over ground forces. The latter reorganised and expanded available forces into six brigades of three battalions each (based in Aden, Beihan, Al-Qisab, Mukayris, Al Anad, Al Abr and Mukalla), a signal battalion, training battalion, military academy, military police unit and several minor support units. Furthermore, the Soviets became instrumental in the development of an effective intelligence system based on human and technical resources, and the establishment of an effective logistics system capable of supporting mobile operations, and they also provided advanced training, including for counter-insurgency (COIN) operations.

=== North Yemen Civil War ===
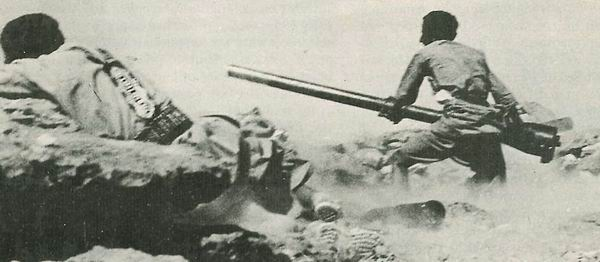
Fighting during the North Yemen Civil War

The North Yemen Civil War began in 1962 and ended in 1970. It took place between the northern Yemen Arab Republican forces and the Mutawakkilite Kingdom of Yemen. The Royalists received support from Saudi Arabia and Jordan while the Republicans received support from Egypt and the Soviet Union, using about 55,000 Egyptian troops. The Royalists used local tribesmen.

The Royalists were commanded by Muhammad al-Badr of the Mutawakkilite Kingdom of Yemen.

The Republican commanders were Gamal Abdel Nasser and Abdel Hakim Amer from Egypt and Abdullah al-Sallal from the Yemen Arab Republic. During the conflict over 50,000 of Egypt's troops were tied down in Yemen, which proved to be a disadvantage to Egypt during the 1967 Six-Day War with Israel. Egyptian troops were withdrawn to join the Six-Day War. The civil war concluded when the Republican forces won, and resulting in the transformation of the Mutawakkilite Kingdom of Yemen into the Yemen Arab Republic. Over 100,000 died on both sides during the conflict.

=== Chemical warfare during North Yemen Civil War ===
The first attack took place on June 8, 1963 against Kawma, a village of about 100 inhabitants in northern Yemen, killing about seven people and damaging the eyes and lungs of twenty-five others. This incident is considered to have been experimental, and the bombs were described as "home-made, amateurish and relatively ineffective". The Egyptian authorities suggested that the reported incidents were probably caused by napalm, not gas. The Israeli Foreign Minister, Golda Meir, suggested in an interview that Nasser would not hesitate to use gas against Israel as well.

There were no reports of gas during 1964, and only a few were reported in 1965. The reports grew more frequent in late 1966. On December 11, 1966, fifteen gas bombs killed two people and injured thirty-five. On January 5, 1967, the biggest gas attack came against the village of Kitaf, causing 270 casualties, including 140 fatalities. The target may have been Prince Hassan bin Yahya, who had installed his headquarters nearby. The Egyptian government denied using poison gas, and alleged that Britain and the US were using the reports as psychological warfare against Egypt. On February 12, 1967, it said it would welcome a UN investigation. On March 1, U Thant said he was "powerless" to deal with the matter.

On May 10, the twin villages of Gahar and Gadafa in Wadi Hirran, where Prince Mohamed bin Mohsin was in command, were gas bombed, killing at least seventy-five. The Red Cross was alerted and on June 2, it issued a statement in Geneva expressing concern. The Institute of Forensic Medicine at the University of Berne made a statement, based on a Red Cross report, that the gas was likely to have been halogenous derivatives - phosgene, mustard gas, lewisite, chloride or cyanogen bromide.

The gas attacks stopped for three weeks after the Six-Day War of June, but resumed on July, against all parts of royalist Yemen. Casualty estimates vary, and an assumption, considered conservative, is that the mustard and phosgene-filled aerial bombs caused approximately 1,500 fatalities and 1,500 injuries.

=== 1994 civil war ===
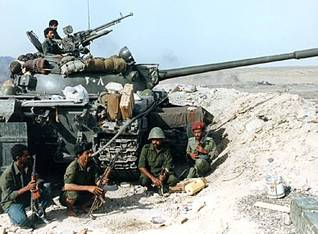
Southern separatist forces with the T-55 tank during civil war.

During the 1994 Yemeni civil war almost all of the actual fighting in the 1994 civil war occurred in the southern part of the country despite air and missile attacks against cities and major installations in the north. Southerners sought support from neighboring states and received billions of dollars of equipment and financial assistance, mostly from Saudi Arabia, which felt threatened during Gulf War in 1991 when Yemen supported Saddam Hussien. The United States repeatedly called for a cease-fire and a return to the negotiating table. Various attempts, including by a UN special envoy, were unsuccessful to effect a cease-fire.

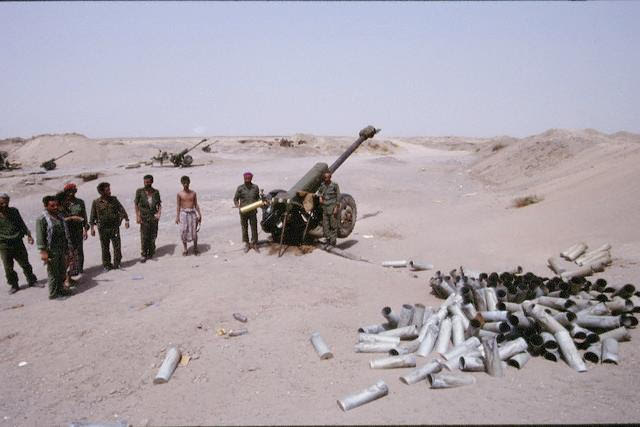
Yemeni government forces artillery positions.

Southern leaders declared secession and the establishment of the Democratic Republic of Yemen (DRY) on 21 May 1994, but the DRY was not recognized by the international community. Ali Nasir Muhammad supporters greatly assisted military operations against the secessionists and Aden was captured on 7 July 1994. Other resistance quickly collapsed and thousands of southern leaders and military personnel went into exile.

=== 2011 Yemeni revolution ===
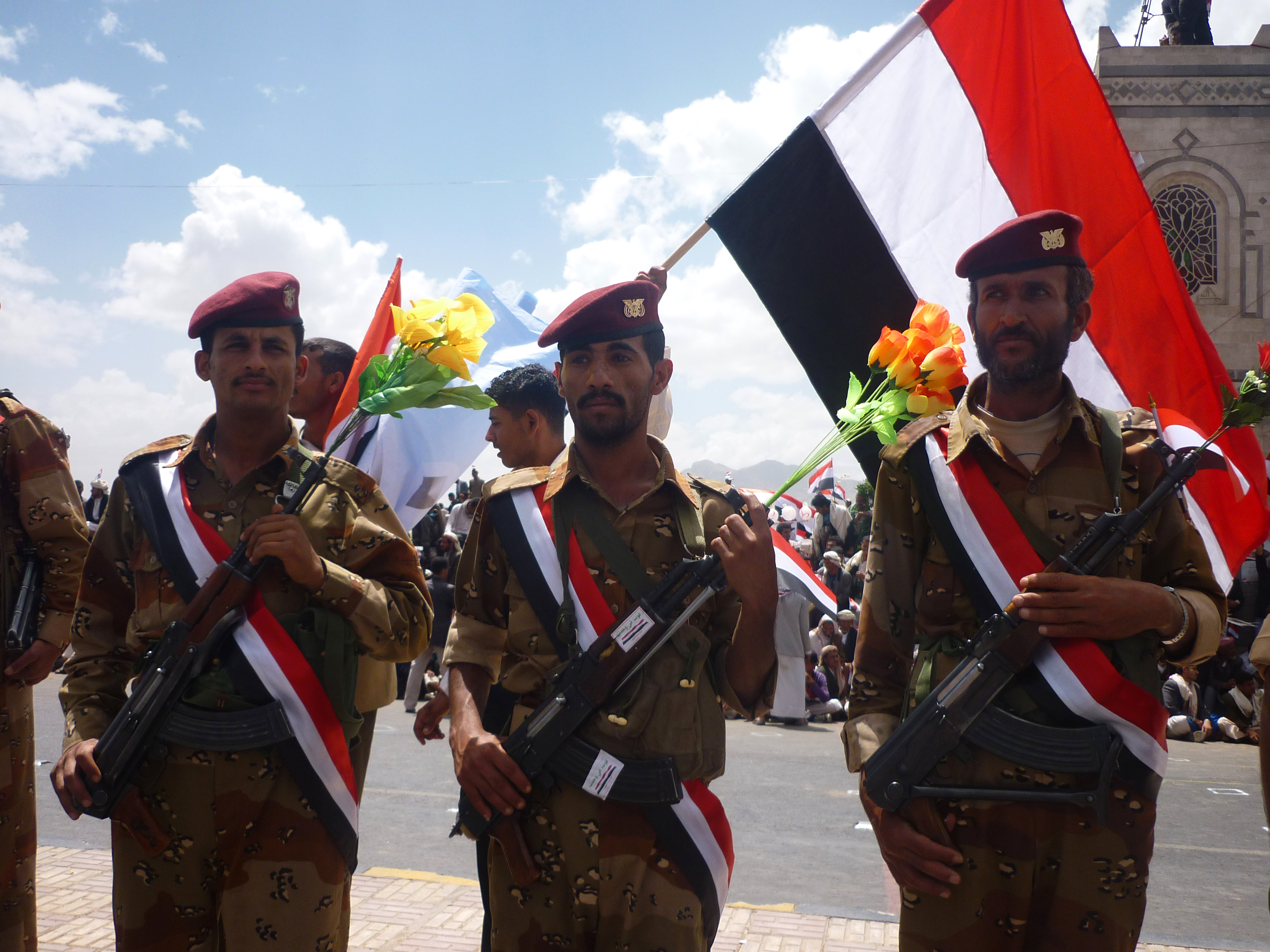
Yemeni soldiers from the 1st Armoured Division on 60th Street in Sanaa, 22 May 2011

In March 2011, a month after the beginning of an uprising against President Saleh's rule, Maj. Gen. Ali Mohsen al-Ahmar, the commander of the 1st Armoured Division, defected to the side of the protesters taking hundreds of troops and several tanks to protect protesting citizens. Rival tanks of the 1st Armoured Division and the Republican Guard faced off against each other in Sann'a.

The Yemeni Army's 119th Brigade, which had defected to the opposition, launched a joint operation with 31st and 201st Brigades which were still loyal to Saleh and retook the city of Zinjibar on 10 September from Islamist militants who were exploiting the chaos in the country to expand their influence. The offensive relieved besieged army units in the process.

On 17 September, at least one rebel soldier was killed in clashes with loyalists in Sanaa near the city's central square, trying to protect the protest camp there from security forces. After anti-government tribesmen overran a loyalist army base north of Sanaa on 20 September, capturing 30 soldiers, the government responded with airstrikes killing up to 80 civilians.

=== Houthi takeover in Yemen ===
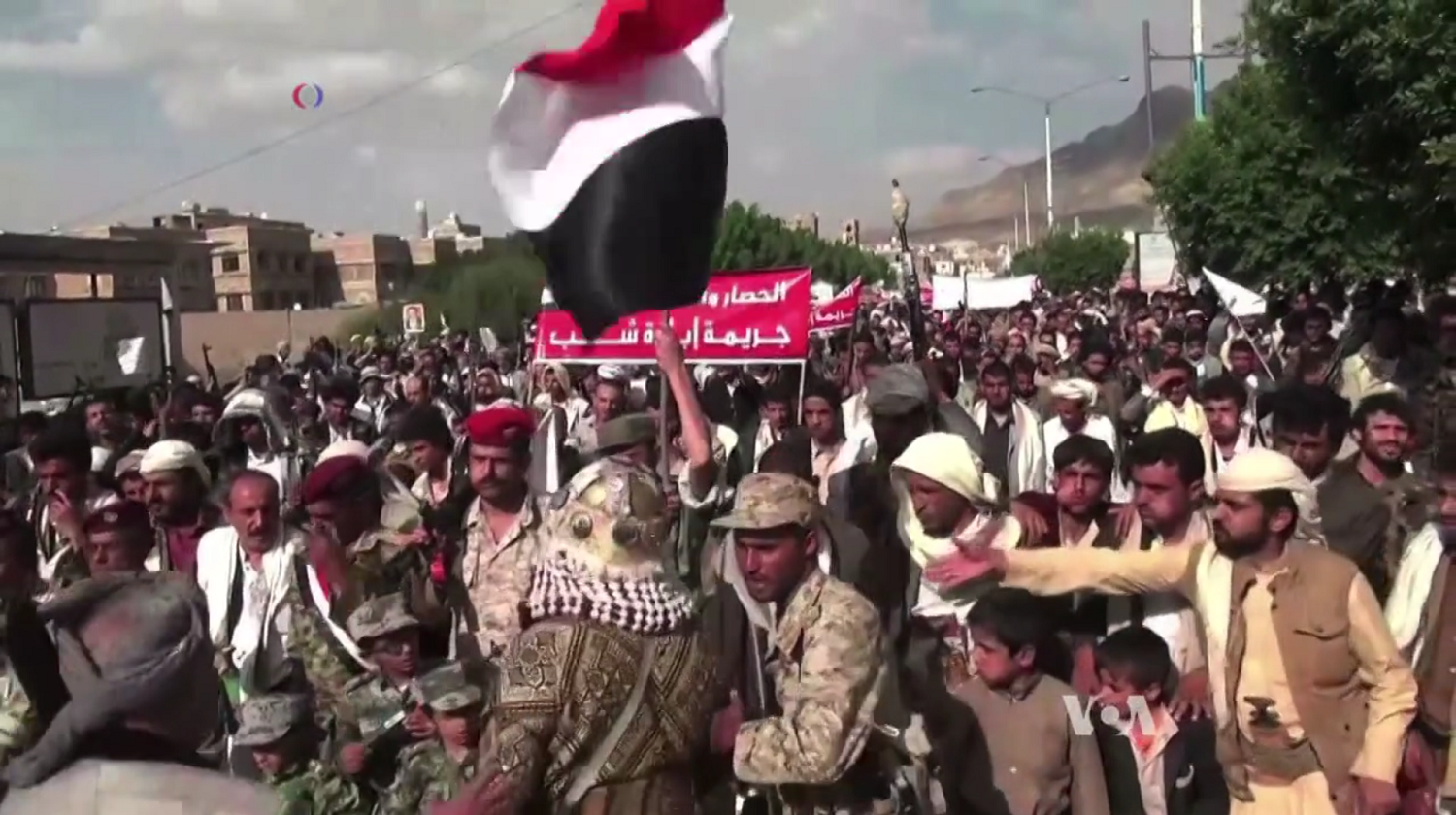
Houthis protest in Sanaa

During the revolution of 2011, large crowds of Houthis participated in the protests. When the armed uprising started, the Houthis used this as a chance to take over northern Yemen. When Ali Abdullah Saleh was replaced by Abdrabbuh Mansour Hadi as president, Hadi was to take over as president for two years. The Houthis also participated in the national dialogue conference, brokered by the United Nations and the Gulf Cooperation Council to increase Hadi's term by 1 year and allow him to introduce sweeping reforms in all civilian, economic and military authorities alike. This was to purge all authorities of Saleh loyalists. But the National Dialogue conference also allowed Hadi to convert Yemen into a six-region federal system. The Houthis withheld their support from the federal region system. After Hadi's decision to increase fuel prices and remove diverse subsidies, the Houthis began an advance on all Yemeni provinces to complete the takeover of Yemen. Hajjah and Amran were the first targets followed by their siege of the Sunni-majority town of Dammaj. After problems in Egypt, Saudi Arabia was forced to declare the Moslem Brotherhood a terrorist organization and withdraw their support from the Islah party in Yemen. This allowed the Houthis to overrun the 310th armored brigade in Amran and execute its commander and replace him with a Houthi. After this, the Houthis advanced on Sanaa and aligned themselves with the Saleh-loyal General People's Congress (GPC). As the Yemeni special forces and republican guard were loyal to the GPC, this allowed the Houthis to overrun several of their bases in Sanaa. This was the first of the Houthi presence in Sanaa. As a result, the Yemeni Air Force (YAF) launched heavy airstrikes on columns of Houthi forces outside Sanaa; this caused them a large number of casualties but didn't stop their advance. The Houthis pushed on and captured the high command of the Yemeni army. Hadi panicked as the presidential compound was besieged by the Houthis. Finally, the fighting ended as the peace and partnership agreement was signed between the Houthis and Hadi. This included Hadi replacing his whole cabinet. The Houthis saw this as a chance to track down and arrest the Islah Party's allies in Sanaa. They also tried to impose their control over the whole Yemeni Military, but when the officers refused to obey them, they replaced them with Houthi favorites and with this, they even took over the restive Yemeni Air Force. After this, the surviving elements of the Islah party's militia, the presidential guard, and remnants of military units loyal to Hadi decided to fight. Violence reached its peak in the capital when the Houthis launched their last power grab when they drove out the presidential guard from the presidential compound and secured camp Bilad Al Rus, the main base of the MBG (Missile Batteries group) as well as Al Daylami Air Base and the Ministry of defense building in Sanaa.

=== Pro-Hadi/Alimi forces ===
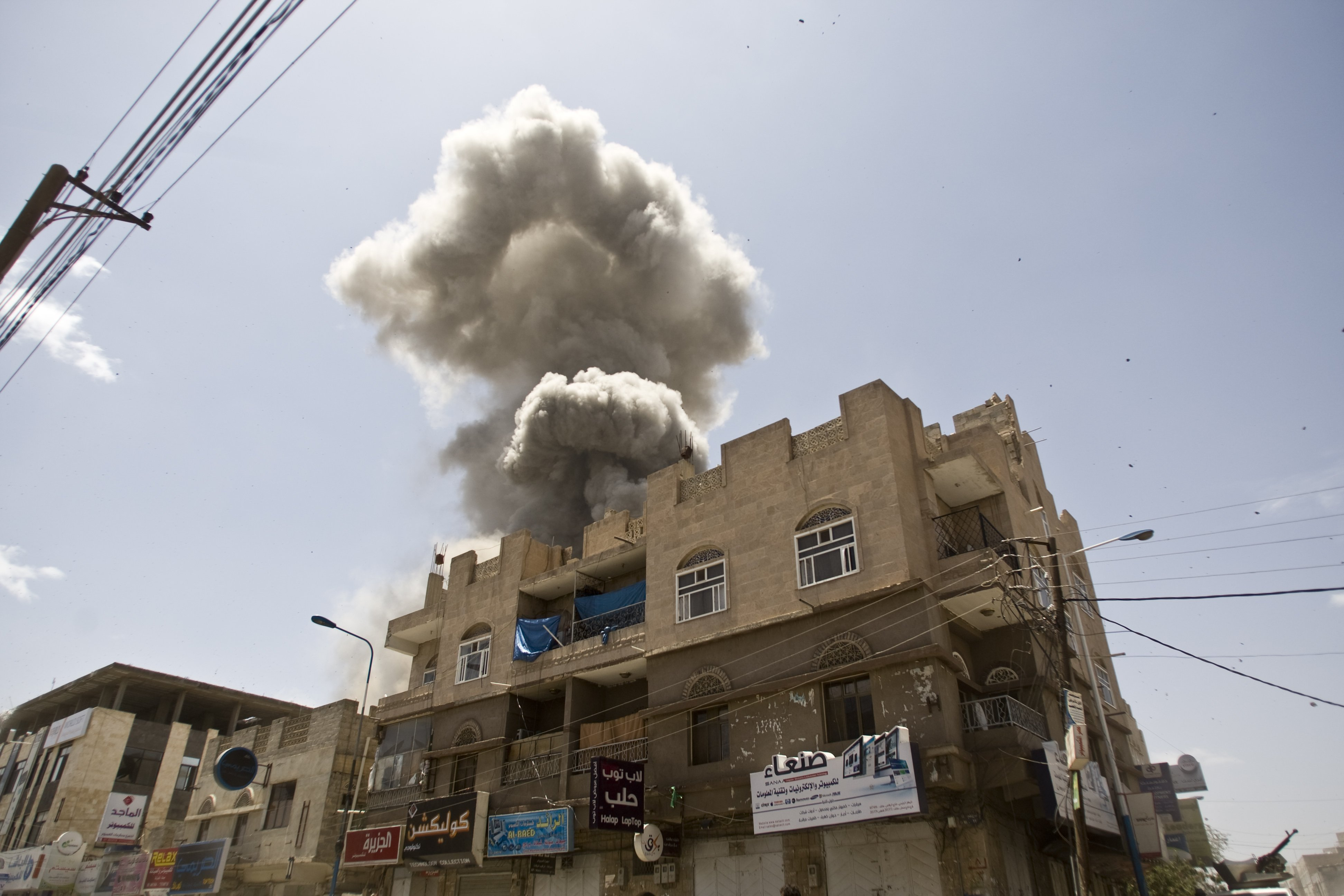
Aerial bombardments on Sanaa

Beginning in October 2015, the Saudi-led coalition transitioned from direct fighting to providing support and training for Yemeni forces loyal to governments of Presidents Hadi and Alimi. They helped form a new Yemeni National Army (YNA), which they trained at the Al Anad Air Base in the Lahij Governorate. These consisted of Hadi/Alimi loyalist units, popular mobilization militias and Eritrean and Somali recruits. They also include large parts of the former Yemeni military that are based in the southern, eastern and central parts of Yemen. Eight brigades were trained in total. The Gulf coalition-trained YNA order of battle is as follows:

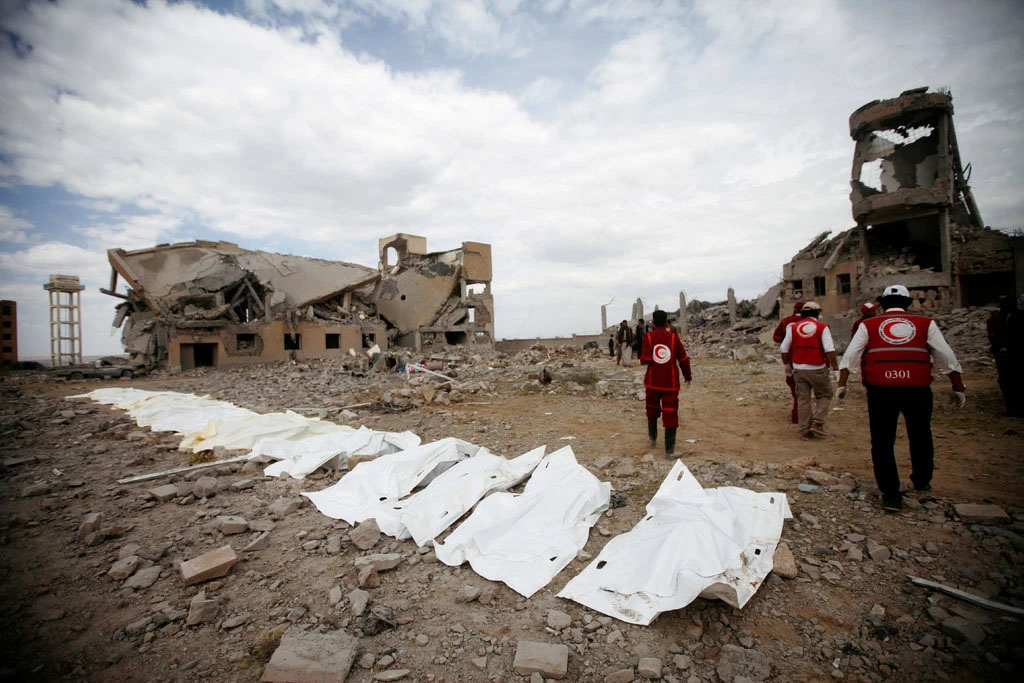
Victims of Saudi-led airstrikes.

- "Salman Decisiveness"
- 1st Infantry Brigade
- 2nd Infantry Brigade
- 3rd Infantry Brigade
- 4th Infantry Brigade
- 19th Infantry Brigade
- 22nd Infantry Brigade
- 14th Armoured Brigade

Parts of the former Yemeni army also joined Hadi including:

- 35th Armoured Brigade
- 115th Armoured Brigade
- 312th Armoured Brigade
- 123rd Infantry Brigade
- 3rd Mountain Infantry Brigade
- 2nd Border Guards Brigade
- 11th Border Guards Brigade
- 310th Armoured Brigade
- 3rd Presidential Guard Brigade

The Hadi government forces are organized into military districts, as established by the Presidential Decree No. 103 dating back from 2013, dividing each of the country's provinces into military regions. As of 2016, four are in active service under President Hadi, but the other three are areas under Houthi control. They include the following:

- First Military Region (Hadhramaut Governorate—Seiyun)
- Second Military Region (Hadhramaut Governorate–Mukalla)
- Third Military Region (Marib Governorate)
- Fourth Military Region (Aden Governorate)

In addition to ground forces, the UAE air force trained pilots to form a new Yemeni Air Force using Air Tractor AT-802 light craft. By late October these were reported to be in operation and assisting Hadi loyalist army units near Taiz. Yemeni Army troops fought in Taiz against the Houthi forces, seizing control of several districts in the city in late April 2017. A renewed offensive was launched by the Yemeni national army which received plentiful air support from the Yemeni air corps and Saudi-led coalition; they secured the whole of the city and installed the Hadi government in overall control of Taizz.

The Yemeni army has been reinforced by thousands of volunteers under Tareq Saleh's national resistance forces. Elements of the republican guard and the Giants brigade have joined the Yemeni army against the Houthis.

== Organization ==
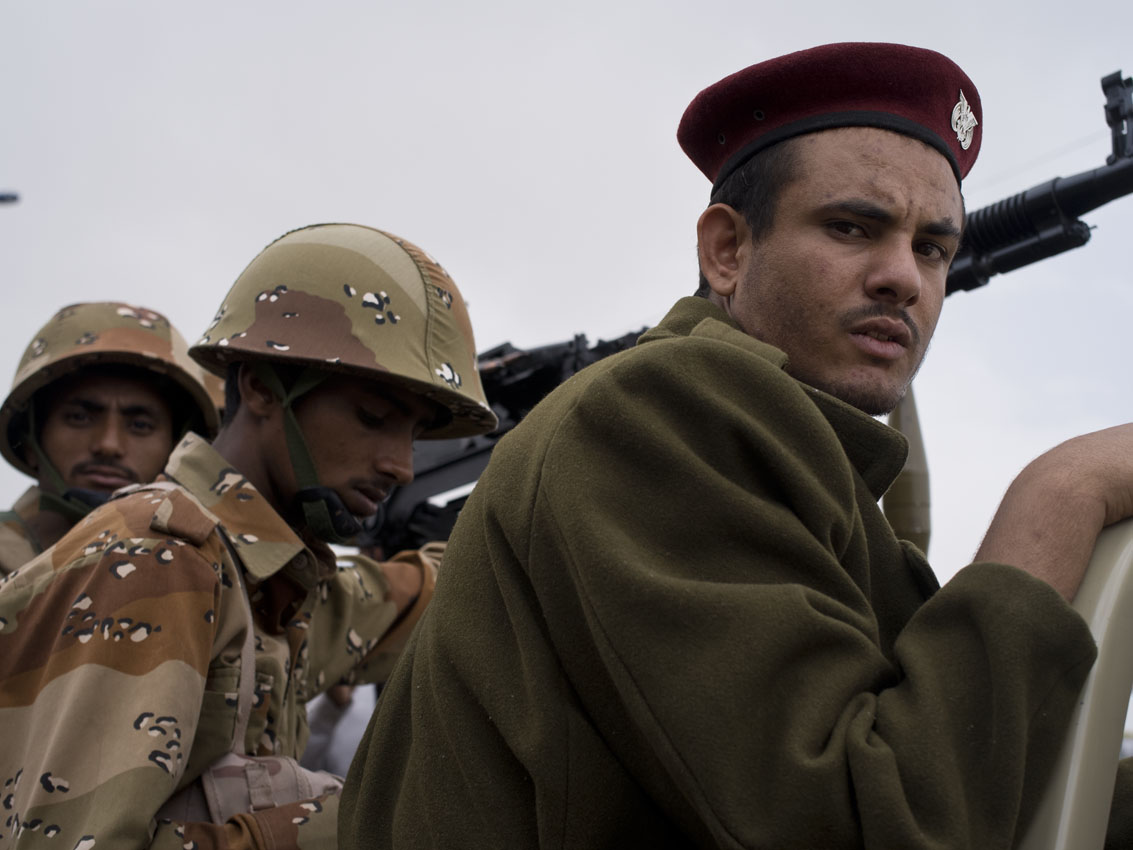
Yemeni soldiers, August 2011

Yemen's military is divided into an army, navy, air force, and the presidential guard.

The army is organized into eight armored brigades, 16 infantry brigades, six mechanized brigades, two airborne commando brigades, one surface-to-surface missile brigade, three artillery brigades, one central guard force, one Special Forces brigade, and six air defense brigades, which consist of four anti-aircraft artillery battalions and one surface-to-air missile battalion.

Having himself come to power by coup, Saleh has been extremely careful to select Commanders whose loyalty is ensured by tribal bonds. Members of Saleh's Sanhan tribe control all military districts and most high security posts, with the commanders enjoying blood and/or close ties to Saleh. The Commanders report directly to the President, outside the normal channels of the Ministry of Defense and without constitutional mandate. They are the final authority in nearly every aspect of regional governance. In practice, they behave like tribal sheikhs and super-governors, parceling out new schools, water projects, and money. Despite periodic efforts to integrate military units, the Commanders recruit largely from regional tribes."

As of September 2005, "Brigadier General Ali Mohsen al-Ahmar, Commander of the Northeastern region, is the most powerful of these military elites. The commander of the Eastern Area is BG Mohammed Ali Mohsen. The Eastern Area includes the governorates of Hadramawt and Al-Mahrah. Ali Faraj is commander for the Central Area, which includes Al-Jawf, Ma'rib, al-Bayda, and Shabwa, while the Southern Commander, controlling the Aden, Taiz, Lahij, al-Dhala and Abyan, is Abd al-Aziz al-Thabet. Finally, BG Awadh bin Fareed commands the Central Area, including the capital Sanaa. With the exception of Ali Mohsen, all of these commands are subject to periodic change or shuffle."

The air force includes an air defense force. Yemen recently placed an order for TOR air defence systems, which will be far more advanced than the current air defense systems in place. The TOR order has been completed. The Yemeni Army has a total active strength of 66,700 troops.

In 2001, Yemen's National Defense Council abolished the existing two-year compulsory military service, relying instead on volunteers to fill posts in the military and security forces. In 2007, the Yemeni government announced that it would reinstate the draft to counter unemployment; approximately 70,000 new recruits were expected to join the military.

=== Chief of staff ===
- April 2006 – December 2014: Ahmed Ali al-Ashwal
- December 2014 – 5 April 2015: Hussein Khairan
- 4 May 2015 – 5 September 2017: Mohammed Ali Al-Maqdashi
- 5 September 2017 – 8 November 2018: Brigadier Taher Ali Al-Aqili
- 8 November 2018 – 28 February 2020: Abdullah Salem al-Nakhai
- 28 February 2020 – present: Sagheer bin Aziz

== Defense budget ==
Yemen's defense spending was historically one of the government's three largest expenditures. The defense budget increased from US$540 million in 2001 to an estimated US$2 billion–US$2.1 billion in 2006, to which it was probably $3.5 billion by 2012. According to the U.S. government, the 2006 budget represents about 6 percent of gross domestic product.

== Paramilitary forces ==
In 2009, Yemen's paramilitary force had about 71,000 troops. Approximately 50,000 constituted the Central Security Organization of the Ministry of Interior; they are equipped with a range of infantry weapons and armored personnel carriers.

20,000 were forces of armed tribal levies.

Yemen was building a small coast guard under the Ministry of Interior, training naval military technicians for posts in Aden and Mukalla.

As of 2026, the internationally-recognized government of Yemen have the Joint Forces including the Saudi-backed Yemeni Emergency Forces and the Yemeni National Resistance. The Houthis maintains the Revolution's Security Service which is a praetorian guard loyal to the leader of the Houthis.

== Army ==
=== 2015 order of battle ===
According to Critical Threats, the order of battle for the Yemeni Land Forces as of February 2015 was:

- 1st Military Region
  - 37th Armored Brigade – al-Khasha, Hadhramaut Governorate
  - 315th Armored Brigade – Thamud, Hadhramaut Governorate
  - 23rd Mechanized Brigade – al-Abr district, Hadhramaut Governorate
  - 11th Border Guard Brigade – Rumah district, Hadhramaut Governorate
  - 135th Infantry Brigade – al-Qatn district, Hadhramaut Governorate
- 2nd Military Region
  - Al-Riyan Airbase – Mukalla, Hadhramaut Governorate
    - 27th Mechanized Brigade – al-Riyan Airbase, Mukalla, Hadhramaut Governorate
    - 190th Air Defense Brigade – al-Riyan Airbase, Mukalla, Hadhramaut Governorate
  - Ghaidah Axis – al-Mahrah Governorate
    - 123rd Infantry Brigade – al-Hat Camp, al-Mahrah Governorate
    - 137th Infantry Brigade – al-Ghaydah district, al-Mahrah Governorate
  - Stationed in Socotra Governorate
    - 1st Naval Infantry Brigade
- 3rd Military Region
  - Sahn al-Jin Camp – Marib city, Marib Governorate
    - 13th Infantry Brigade – Sahn al-Jin Camp, Marib city, Marib Governorate
    - 14th Armored Brigade – Sahn al-Jin Camp, Marib city, Marib Governorate
    - 180th Air Defense Brigade – Sahn al-Jin Camp, Marib city, Marib Governorate
  - Ataq Axis – Ataq, Shabwah Governorate
    - 21st Mechanized Infantry Brigade – Ataq, Shabwah Governorate
    - 19th Infantry Brigade – Bayhan district, Shabwah Governorate
  - Stationed in Shabwah Governorate
    - 2nd Naval Infantry Brigade – Balhaf, Shabwah Governorate
    - 2nd Mountain Infantry Brigade – al-Nusaybah, Shabwah Governorate
  - Stationed in Marib Governorate
    - 107th Infantry Brigade – Safer, Marib Governorate
    - 312th Armored Brigade – Sirwah district, Marib Governorate
    - 3rd Mountain Infantry Brigade – Marib Governorate [Disbanded in place on May 22, 2013.]
- 4th Military Region
  - Stationed in Aden Governorate
    - 39th Armored Brigade – Badr Camp, Khor Maksar district, Aden Governorate
    - 120th Air Defense Brigade – Aden city, Aden Governorate
  - Abyan Axis – Abyan Governorate
    - 15th Infantry Brigade – Zinjibar, Abyan Governorate
    - 111th Armored Brigade – Ahwar district, Abyan Governorate
    - 115th Infantry Brigade – Shuqrah, Abyan Governorate [The 115th Infantry Brigade is in Shaqra District, Abyan, but there is either a unit with the same name or a detachment also stationed in al Jawf.]
    - 119th Infantry Brigade – Jaʽār, Abyan Governorate
  - Taiz Axis – Taiz Governorate
    - 17th Infantry Brigade – Bab al-Mandab district, Taiz Governorate
    - 170th Air Defense Brigade – Bab al-Mandab district, Taiz Governorate
    - 35th Armored Brigade – Mocha and Taiz Airport Camp, Taiz Governorate
    - 22nd Armored Brigade – al-Janad Camp, Taiz city, Taiz Governorate
  - Anad Axis – al-Anad Air Base, Lahij Governorate
    - 201st Mechanized Brigade – al-Anad Air Base, Lahij Governorate
    - 90th Aviation Brigade – al-Anad Air Base, Lahij Governorate
    - 31st Armored Brigade – al-Anad Air Base, Lahij Governorate
    - 39th Aviation Training Brigade – al-Anad Air Base, Lahij Governorate
  - Stationed in Dhale Governorate
    - 33rd Armored Brigade – Dhale city, Dhale Governorate
- 5th Military Region
  - al-Hudaydah Air Force Base – al-Hudaydah Governorate
    - 67th Aviation Brigade – al-Hudaydah Air Force Basem al-Hudaydah Governorate
    - 130th Air Defense Brigade – al-Hudaydah Air Force Basem al-Hudaydah Governorate
  - Stationed in al-Hudaydah Governorate
    - 82nd Infantry Brigade – as-Salif, al-Hudaydah Governorate
    - 121st Infantry Brigade – al-Khawkhah, al-Hudaydah Governorate
  - al Malahaidh Axis – Hajjah Governorate
    - 105th Infantry Brigade – al-Malahaidh, Hajjah Governorate
    - 2nd Border Guards Brigade – Harad district, Hajjah Governorate
  - Stationed in Hajjah Governorate
    - 25th Mechanized Infantry Brigade – Abs district, Hajjah Governorate
- 6th Military Region
  - Sufyan Axis – Amran Governorate
    - 310th Armored Brigade – Amran city, Amran Governorate [Surrendered to al Houthis and likely disbanded in July 2014. Its former commander, Brig. Gen. Hameed Al-Qushaibi, was killed in July 2014.]
    - 72nd Infantry Brigade – Harf Sufyan, Amran Governorate
    - 29th Mechanized Infantry (“Giants”) Brigade – Harf Sufyan, Amran Governorate
  - Saada Axis – Saada Governorate
    - 103rd Infantry Brigade – Saada city, Saada Governorate
    - 127th Infantry Brigade – Saada city, Saada Governorate
    - 133rd Mountain Infantry Brigade – Saada city, Saada Governorate
    - 122nd Infantry Brigade – Saada city, Saada Governorate
    - 1st Artillery Brigade – Saada city, Saada Governorate
    - 125th Infantry Brigade – Saada city, Saada Governorate
    - 101st Infantry Brigade – al-Buqa’, Saada Governorate
    - 131st Infantry Brigade – Kitaf, Saada Governorate
  - al Jawf Axis – al-Jawf Governorate
    - 115th Infantry Brigade – al-Hazm, al-Jawf Governorate [The 115th Infantry Brigade is in Shaqra district, Abyan, but there is either a unit with the same name or a detachment also stationed in al-Jawf.]
- 7th Military Region
  - Stationed in al-Bayda Governorate
    - 26th Mechanized Infantry Brigade – al-Sawadiyah, al-Bayda Governorate
    - 139th Mechanized Infantry Brigade – Radaa, al-Bayda Governorate
    - 117th Mechanized Infantry (al Majed) Brigade – al-Mukayras, al-Bayda Governorate
  - Stationed in Ibb Governorate
    - 30th Armored Brigade – Hamza Camp, Ibb Governorate
    - 55th Artillery Brigade – Yarim, Ibb Governorate
    - 203rd Mechanized Infantry Brigade – Ibb city, Ibb Governorate
  - Stationed in Amran Governorate
    - 9th Mechanized Infantry Brigade – Amran, Amran Governorate [The 9th Mechanized Infantry Brigade may also be under the jurisdiction of the 6th Military District, which is headquartered in Amran.]
- Defense Reserve Forces
  - Stationed in Sanaa Governorate
    - 61st Artillery Brigade – al-Sawad Camp, Sanaa Governorate
    - 102nd Mountain Infantry Brigade – al Jumaymah, Bani Hushaysh district, Sanaa Governorate
    - 63rd Mechanized Infantry Brigade – Bani Jarmouz, Nihm district, Sanaa Governorate
    - 7th Infantry Brigade – Khawlan district, Sanaa Governorate
  - Deployed to Anad Airbase, Lahij Governorate
    - 4th Armored Brigade (Defense Reserve Forces) – al-Anad Air Base, Lahij Governorate
  - al Sami Axis – Sanaa Governorate
    - 62nd Mechanized Infantry Brigade – al Farijah Camp, Arhab district, Sanaa Governorate
    - 83rd Artillery Brigade – Sanaa Governorate
  - Bureau of Logistical Support – al-Hafa Camp, Sanaa Governorate
    - 89th Infantry Brigade – al-Hafa Camp, Sanaa Governorate
    - Ghamdan Brigade – al-Hafa Camp, Sanaa Governorate
