= List of equipment of the Yemeni Army =

Military Equipment of Yemen

This is an inventory of military equipment of the Yemeni Army. The army is organized into eight armored brigades, 16 infantry brigades, six mechanized brigades, two airborne commando brigades, one surface-to-surface missile brigade, three artillery brigades, one central guard force, one Special Forces brigade, and six air defense brigades, which consist of four anti-aircraft artillery battalions and one surface-to-air missile battalion.

== Equipment ==
=== Small arms ===
Name	Image	Caliber	Type	Origin	Faction	Notes
Pistols
TT pistol		7.62×25mm Tokarev	Semi-automatic pistol	Soviet Union		
Glock 19		9×19mm Parabellum	Semi-automatic pistol	Austria	PLC	
Submachine guns
Sterling L2A3		9×19mm	Submachine gun	United Kingdom		
Rifles
SKS		7.62×39mm	Semi-automatic rifle	Soviet Union	SPC	
AK-47		7.62×39mm	Assault rifle	Soviet Union	SPC	
AKM		7.62×39mm	Assault rifle	Soviet Union	SPC	
Type 56 assault rifle		7.62×39mm	Assault rifle	China	SPC	Supplied by Iran to Pro-SPC Yemeni Army.
AKS-74U		5.45x39mm	Carbine Assault rifle	Soviet Union	SPC	
AR-M9		5.56x45mm	Assault rifle	Bulgaria	PLC	
Colt CK901		5.56×45mm	Assault rifle	United States		
M16A2		5.56×45mm	Assault rifle	United States		
M4		5.56×45mm	Carbine Assault rifle	United States		
Steyr AUG		5.56×45mm	Bullpup Assault rifle	Austria	SPC / PLC	Supplied by Saudi Arabia to Pro-PLC Yemeni Army. Captured from Saudi forces by Houthi forces and Pro-SPC.
FN FAL		7.62×51mm	Battle rifle	Belgium		
Heckler & Koch G3		7.62×51mm	Battle rifle	West Germany		Used by Yemeni Republican Guard and Yemeni Special Guard.
Lee-Enfield		.303 British	Bolt-action rifle	British Empire		
Sniper and anti-materiel rifles
Dragunov SVU		7.62×54mmR	Sniper rifle	Russia		Imported before the Civil War.
SVD Dragunov		7.62×54mmR	Sniper rifle	Soviet Union		
Barrett M82		.50 BMG	Anti-materiel rifle	United States	SPC	
Zastava M93 Black Arrow		12.7×108mm	Anti-materiel rifle	FR Yugoslavia	SPC / PLC	
Machine guns
FN Minimi		7.62×51mm	Squad automatic weapon	Belgium		
RPK		7.62×39mm	Squad automatic weapon	Soviet Union	SPC	
PK machine gun		7.62×54mmR	General-purpose machine gun	Soviet Union	SPC	
Browning M2		.50 BMG	Heavy machine gun	United States		
DShKM		12.7×108mm	Heavy machine gun	Soviet Union	SPC / PLC	
Rocket propelled grenade launchers
RPG-7		40mm	Rocket-propelled grenade	Soviet Union	SPC / PLC	
M72 LAW		94mm	Rocket-propelled grenade	United States		
Grenade launchers
M203		40×46mm SR	Grenade launcher	United States		
M79		40×46mm	Grenade launcher	United States		
Portable anti-tank weapons
M40 recoilless rifle		105 mm	Recoilless rifle	United States		
B-10 recoilless rifle		82 mm	Recoilless rifle	Soviet Union		
SPG-9		73 mm	Recoilless rifle	Soviet Union		
9M14 Malyutka		125 mm	Anti-tank missile	Soviet Union		

== Ground Vehicle ==
MBT, IFV, APC & MRAP
Model	Image	Origin	Type	Number	Notes
T-55		Soviet Union	Main battle tank	n/a	
T-62		Soviet Union	Main battle tank	n/a	
T-72		Soviet Union	Main battle tank	n/a	
M60A1 RISE Passive		United States	Main battle tank	~200	Supplied by Saudi Arabia in 1990s.
BMP-1		Soviet Union	Infantry fighting vehicle	n/a	
BMP-2		Soviet Union	Infantry fighting vehicle	n/a	
BTR-60		Soviet Union	Infantry fighting vehicle	n/a	
BTR-152		Soviet Union	Infantry fighting vehicle	n/a	
M113 armored personnel carrier		United States	Armoured fighting vehicle	n/a	Supplied by Saudi Arabia, M113A1
M-ATV		United States	MRAP	n/a	Supplied by Saudi Arabia
BAE Caiman		United States	MRAP	n/a	Supplied by some member of Arab League
Humaida		Yemen	Armored vehicle	n/a	
Al-Shibl II		Saudi Arabia	Armored vehicle	n/a	
IMV & Technical
Humvee		United States	Infantry mobility vehicle	n/a	Supplied by Saudi Arabia, M1123 and M1151 variants
GAZ Tiger		Russia	Infantry mobility vehicle	n/a	
Land Cruiser (truck)		Japan	Technical (vehicle)/Light utility vehicle	n/a	J70 series.
Ford F-Series		United States	Technical (vehicle)/Light utility vehicle	n/a	F-350 and F-550.

== Artillery ==
Model	Image	Origin	Type	Number	Notes
Towed Artillery
M-46 field gun		Soviet Union	Towed field gun	60	
Self-Propelled Artillery
2S1 Gvozdika		Soviet Union	Self-propelled artillery		
BM-21 Grad		Soviet Union	Multiple rocket launcher		
