= Yasir Abdel Baqi =

Yemeni novelist (born 1972)

Yasir Abdel Baqi (born 1972) is a Yemeni novelist, screenwriter, journalist and author. He was born in Aden and studied history and antiquities at university. His first book of short stories was called Ahlam (Dreams) followed by a collection called Night Woman. His controversial novel Zahavar appeared in 2008.

More recently, Abdel Baqi has written his first screenplay, Waheedah. He has also contributed to a stage play called Red Card that was presented by the theatre group Gulf of Aden in 2010.

Abdel Baqi's work has appeared in translation in English and Italian. His short story "Pullman #99" has featured in two foreign-language anthologies: Oranges in the Sun (2007) and Perle dello Yemen (2009). He was also one of the Yemeni authors presented in an issue of Banipal magazine devoted to contemporary Yemeni literature.

Abdel Baqi is an editor of the Aden-based magazine Al-Manara, an organ of the Yemen Writers' Union.
