= Ministry of Defense (Yemen) =

Government ministry of Yemen

- Emblem of the Armed Forces of Yemen

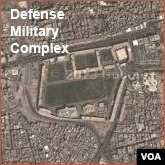
- Satellite imagery of the Ministry of Defense complex

Agency overview
- Formed: 1990
- Jurisdiction: Government of Yemen
- Headquarters: Sana'a, Aden
- Minister responsible: Taher al-Aqili
- Agency executive: Sagheer Hamoud Aziz, Chief of the Staff

The Ministry of Defense (MoD; Arabic: وزارة الدفاع) is a government ministry of Yemen that is responsible for the Yemeni Armed Forces. The incumbent Minister of Defense is general Taher al-Aqili, who was appointed in February 2026. The main headquarters of the Ministry is in Sana'a.

== Authority ==
According to the constitution of Yemen, the President of Yemen serves as the commander-in-chief of Yemen Armed Forces and is responsible for appointing the defense minister. On 19 December 2012, President Abdrabbuh Mansur Hadi, issued a presidential decree to restructure the armed forces into five main branches: the air force and the air defense, the Navy and coastal defense, the land forces, the border guard, and the strategic reserve. The decision included also the division of the military field across the country into seven military regions.

== Military regions ==
1. 1st Military Region in Seiyun, Hadhramaut.
2. 2nd Military Region in Mukalla, Hadhramaut.
3. 3rd Military Region in Marib governorate.
4. 4th Military Region in Aden.
5. 5th Military Region in Hajjah.
6. 6th Military Region in Amran.
7. 7th Military Region in Dhamar.

== List of ministers of defense ==
No	Name	Portrait	Took office	Left office	Political affiliation
1	Haitham Qasem Taher		24 May 1990	30 May 1994	Socialist
2	Abdrabbuh Mansur Hadi		30 May 1990	3 October 1994	GPC
3	Abdulmalik al-Sayani		6 October 1994	15 May 1997	GPC
4	Mohammed Dhayfulla Mohammed		15 May 1997	16 May 1998	GPC
5	Abdullah Ali Alewa		4 April 2001	16 May 2003	
6	Mohammed Nasser Ahmed		11 February 2006	1 November 2014	GPC
7	Mahmoud al-Subaihi		8 November 2014	6 November 2018	
8	Mohammed Ali al-Maqdashi		7 November 2018	28 July 2022	
9	Mohsen al-Daeri		28 July 2022	8 January 2026	
10	Taher al-Aqili		6 February 2026	Incumbent	

== See also ==
- Cabinet of Yemen
- Politics of Yemen
- Yemeni Armed Forces
- National Defence Council (Yemen)
