= National Defense Commission =

National Defense Commission may refer to:

- National Defense Commission (China), the highest military advisory body of China from 1954 to 1975.
- National Defense Commission (North Korea), the highest state institution for military and national defense leadership in North Korea from 1998 to 2016.

== See also ==
- Civilian control of the military in communist states
