= National Defence Council (Yemen) =

Yemen government body responsible for military and national defense affairs

- مجلس الدفاع الوطني

Agency overview
- Formed: 20 August 1991
- Jurisdiction: Government of Yemen
- Agency executive: Rashad al-Alimi, Chairperson

National Defence Council (Arabic: مجلس الدفاع الوطني) is a governmental body in charge of coordinating Yemen's national security and defense strategy. It was formed by President Ali Abdullah Saleh on 20 August 1991. The council is chaired by the President of Yemen and composed of several key ministers and military officials.

== History ==
The National Defence Council was established by Decree no. (62) of 1991.

== Responsibilities ==
The National Defence Council is responsible for drawing up defense strategy, advising on issues related to declaring the war, mobilization, and state of emergency. On 22 October 2022, the council held a meeting in Aden to discuss attacks claimed by the Houthis movement on al-Dhabba and Nashimah oil ports in Hadramaut and Shabwah governorates. The council took a decision no. (1) to label the Houthi group a terrorist organization.

== Membership ==
Structure of the Yemen's National Defence Council
Chairperson	President
Members	Vice President
Members	Speaker of the Parliament; Prime Minister; Minister of the Defense; Minister of the Interior; Minister of ForeignAffairs; Minister of Information; Minister of Finance; Chief of the General Staff; Adviser to the Presidency for Military Affairs
