= Sagheer Hamoud Aziz =

Yemeni military officer (born 1967)

Lieutenant general Sagheer Hamoud Aziz
- صغير حمود عزيز بن عزيز
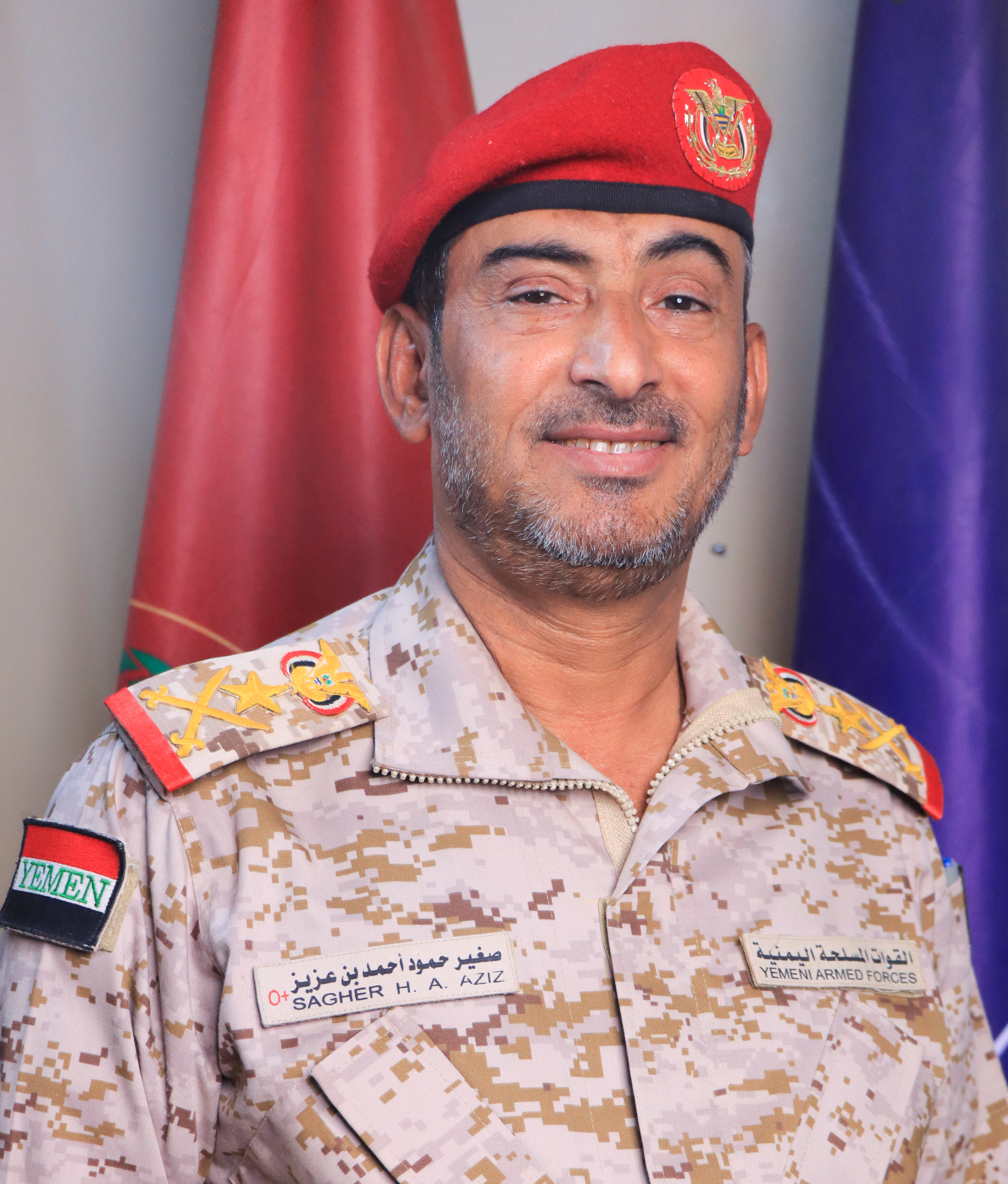
- Aziz in 2022

Chief of Staff of the Yemeni Army disputed by Yusuf al-Madani (Supreme Political Council)
- Incumbent
- Assumed office 28 February 2020
- President: Abdrabbuh Mansur Hadi, Rashad al-Alimi
- Prime Minister: Maeen Abdulmalik Saeed; Ahmad Awad bin Mubarak
- Preceded by: ِAbdullah Al-Nakha'ai

Commander of the Joint Operations of the Yemeni Army
- Incumbent
- Assumed office 11 July 2019
- Appointed by: Abdrabbuh Mansur Hadi

Personal details
- Born: 1967 (age 58–59) Al-Amashyah, Harf Sufyan District, Amran Governorate, North Yemen
- Party: General People's Congress
- Website: Twitter

Military service
- Allegiance: North Yemen (1983–1990); Yemen (1990–present)
- Branch/service: (Yemen) Yemeni Armed Forces
- Years of service: 1983–present
- Rank: Lieutenant general
- Unit: Republican Guard (1983–2012)
- Battles/wars: Yemeni Civil War (1994); Houthi insurgency Yemeni Revolution; Yemeni Civil War (2014–present)

Sagheer Hamoud Ahmed Aziz (Note: His forename is also rendered "Sagher Hamood, or Saghir", and he is commonly known as Sagheer bin Aziz.) (Arabic: صغير حمود احمد عزيز; born 1967) is a Yemeni military officer and politician who serves as the current chief of staff of the Yemeni Armed Forces. A GPC member in the Yemeni Parliament, Aziz was appointed as Chief of the General Staff of the Yemeni Army and promoted to lieutenant general on 28 February 2020.

== Early life and education ==
Born in Al-Amashyah, Harf Sufyan District, Amran Governorate. He completed his primary schooling there, and continued his high education in Sana'a. He earned a Bachelor’s degree in Business Administration from Sanaa University in 2000.

=== Military education ===
- Master's degree in military science, Joint Command and Staff College, Sudan, 2017
- Battalion Commanders' Course, Thulaya Military Institute, Aden
- Company Commanders and Battery Commanders Course, the Republican Guard combat school
- Management and Personnel Affairs course, National Institute of Administrative Sciences, Sanaa, 1989
- Special Forces and Special Forces Instructors Course, the Republican Guard, 1986
- Thunderbolt Course, the Republican Guard

== Political career ==
He is a GPC member of the Yemeni House of Representatives and elected to the Yemeni Parliament in 1997 and 2003 parliamentary sessions. He is also a member of the National Dialogue Conference.

== Military career ==
Sagheer bin Azizi joined the military service in the Yemeni Republican Guard (then under North Yemen) in 1983. He was promoted to the rank of second lieutenant in 1990 then to the rank of Brigadier in the Yemeni Army in 2007.

== Main commands ==
- Platoon commander, the Republican Guard, Sana'a
- Company commander, the Republican Guard, Sana'a
- Commander of the 1st Armored Division positions in Amshi, Harf Sufyan District, Amran Governorate
- Battalion chief of staff, the Republican Guard camp
- Deputy Chief Teacher, the Republican Guard Combat School
- Head of Tariq's Operations Camp, the Republican Guard
- Deputy chief of staff for training affairs, 2016
- Head of the Government Team in UN Redeployment Coordination Committee in Hudeidah, 2018
- Commander of the Yemeni military Joint Operations, 2019
- Chief of Staff of the Yemeni Army, 28 February 2020 – present

== 2020 missile attack ==
On 27 May 2020, a missile strike targeted the Yemeni army's chief of staff Sagheer bin Aziz during a meeting with military leaders at Sahn al-Jan military base near Marib. He survived the attack, but his son Fahd Aziz and his nephew Abdul Qawi were killed. Six other soldiers who were accompanying Gen Sagheer were also killed.
