= Faisal Rajab =

Former Yemeni military officer (born 1954)

- فيصل رجب
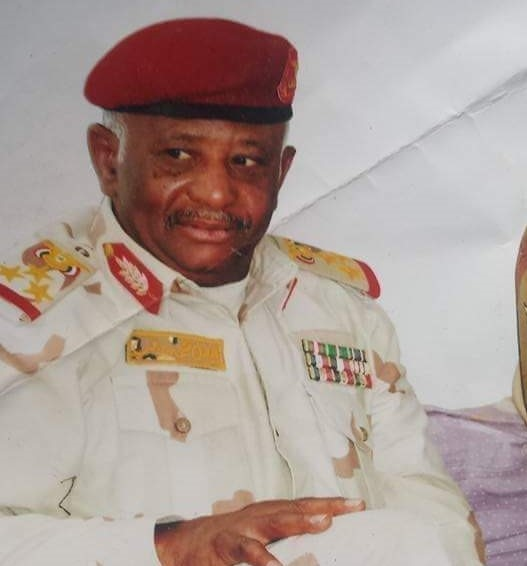
- Born: 1954 (age 71–72); Al Makhzan, Fadhli Sultanate
- Education: Frunze Military Academy
- Military career
- Allegiance: Yemen
- Branch: Yemeni Land Forces
- Service years: 1960s–2015
- Rank: Lieutenant General
- Unit: 14th Infantry Brigade
- Commands: 30th Brigade; 6th Infantry Brigade; 5th Infantry Brigade; 119th Infantry Brigade
- Conflicts: Yemeni civil war (1994); Houthi insurgency; Operation Scorched Earth; Al-Qaeda insurgency in Yemen; Battle of Zinjibar (2011–2012); Battle of Dofas; 2012 Abyan offensive; Yemeni civil war (2014–present); Battle of Aden Airport; Lahij insurgency (POW)

Faisal Rajab (Arabic: فيصل رجب; born 1954) is a former Yemeni military officer. A native of Abyan Governorate, Rajab joined the military of South Yemen and, after receiving education at the Frunze Military Academy in the Soviet Union, held various posts in the army until 1986, when he defected to North Yemen. Within the Yemeni Armed Forces of the unified Republic of Yemen, Rajab commanded several army units through numerous conflicts, including the Yemeni civil war in 1994 and the Houthi insurgency. During the Yemeni revolution, he voiced support for General Ali Mohsen al-Ahmar and defected to the opposition. During that period, he and his unit, the 119th Infantry Brigade, were one of the main army units fighting the Battle of Zinjibar against the jihadist group Ansar al-Sharia.

Rajab and his brigade remained loyal to the internationally-recognized government when the Yemeni civil war broke out in 2014. Rajab was coordinating with Defense Minister Mahmoud al-Subaihi and intelligence chief Nasser Mansour Hadi when they were captured by Houthi forces advancing through Lahij in March 2015. Rajab spent the next eight years in Houthi captivity, being able to speak to his family only once in 2019. He was eventually released on 30 April 2023 as part of an extensive prisoner swap between the Houthis and the Yemeni government.

== Early life and education ==
Rajab was born in 1954 in Al Makhzan, a village in the Fadhli Sultanate in what is now Abyan Governorate. He received primary education in Khanfar before moving to Abyan's capital, Zinjibar, where he completed secondary education. In the late 1960s, after the British withdrawal from Yemen and the establishment of the People's Republic of Southern Yemen, Rajab joined the newly independent military in order to support his family. He travelled to the Soviet Union to study military science at the Frunze Military Academy, where he received a bachelor's degree in 1980 and a master's degree thereafter.

== Military career ==
Upon his return to South Yemen, Rajab was appointed as the Chief of Staff of the 14th Infantry Brigade, based in the Mukayras area. He continued to rise through the ranks, eventually being appointed the commander of the 30th Brigade in al-Mahrah. Although he was not directly involved in the South Yemeni crisis in 1986, in the aftermath of the conflict Rajab among other generals left their posts in the South Yemeni army to flee to North Yemen. Rajab held various positions in the North Yemeni military, bringing him across the country until he eventually settled in Sanaa.

Upon the unification of Yemen in 1990, he was assigned as commander of the 6th Infantry Brigade of the newly-formed Yemeni Armed Forces. As commander of the brigade, under the 1st Armored Division, he participated in the Yemeni civil war of 1994 on the side of the central Yemeni government. Later on, he participated in the six wars against the Houthi insurgency while commanding the 5th Infantry Brigade, which was eventually reorganized as the 119th Infantry Brigade. During Operation Scorched Earth in 2009, when an army artillery shell hit a civilian home in the village of Mudaqqa in Amran Governorate, the owner contacted Rajab through telephone, who apologized for his brigade's mistake. The civilian said to Human Rights Watch that "We have Faisal Rajab’s [telephone] number because he's been there for a while. Everybody likes the commander."

During the Yemeni revolution of 2011, Rajab was among several other generals who pledged their support for the opposition against President Ali Abdullah Saleh after 1st Armored Brigade commander Ali Mohsen al-Ahmar did so in March. Amid the revolution, the al-Qaeda in the Arabian Peninsula-linked group Ansar al-Sharia took over several areas of Abyan, including the capital of Zinjibar. Rajab and his 119th Infantry Brigade were one of the leading units against the militants in the Battle of Zinjibar, though they blamed Saleh for the situation in the first place. His units fought alongside other units loyal to the government. Rajab coordinated with fellow brigade commander Mahmoud al-Subaihi to launch a two-pronged offensive on the city in September 2011, which lifted the three-month-long siege on the local 25th Mechanized Brigade. The 119th Infantry Brigade was among the targets of an Ansar al-Sharia attack on the Dofas checkpoint in March 2012 which led to hundreds of army casualties. Rajab later led the brigade during an all-out offensive in May 2012 which saw the complete liberation of Zinjibar and the rest of Abyan.

After the Houthi takeover of Yemen and the flight of President Abdrabbuh Mansur Hadi to Aden, Rajab and the 119th Infantry Brigade followed suit, remaining loyal to the internationally-recognized government. In March 2015, as Special Security Forces commander Abdul-Hafez al-Saqqaf refused orders from Hadi to step down from his position, Rajab sent hundreds of soldiers to Aden near the camps of the SSF. Tensions between pro-government forces and the SSF eventually led to the Battle of Aden Airport later in the month, which saw involvement from Rajab and his unit.

=== Capture ===
In March 2015, Rajab, along with then-Defense Minister Subaihi and local Political Security Organization deputy leader Nasser Mansour Hadi, were attempting to rally together pro-Hadi forces to resist a Houthi offensive in the south. Before they could do so however, Houthi forces had advanced into Lahij Governorate and its capital, al-Hawtah, where they captured the three men at the Al-Anad Air Base. Unable to fulfill his military role, President Hadi officially replaced Rajab with Colonel Nasser Basmai as commander of the 119th Infantry Brigade in April 2016.

== Detention and release ==
After his capture in 2015, the Houthis kept Rajab hidden in captivity for the next eight subsequent years. United Nations Security Council Resolution 2216, passed in April 2015, stipulated the release of Rajab, along with Subaihi and Nasser. The Yemeni government considered the three men to be the three Houthi-detained prisoners most prioritized for release during negotiations with the group. In January 2016, Ismail Ould Cheikh Ahmed, the UN special envoy to Yemen, said he was assured by Houthi officials during his visit to Sanaa that the three were in good condition. Rajab was able to communicate with his family for the first and only time during his incarceration in 2019, amid negotiations for a prisoner swap mediated by Oman.

As part of an heightened push in peace talks between the Houthis, the Yemeni government and Saudi Arabia, a series of prisoner exchanges organised by the Red Cross took place between the parties. On 14 April, Subaihi and Nasser were among the hundreds of prisoners released by the Houthis. Rajab was notably absent from the initial exchanges, leading to a delegation of senior tribesmen from Abyan, Shabwah and al-Bayda travelling to Sanaa to seek his release. On 30 April, the Houthis released Rajab after a ceremony in Sanaa, where then he was flown to his native Abyan. The Houthis said that he had not been included on the government's list of prisoners to be freed, but was released on the orders of group leader Abdul-Malik al-Houthi out of respect for the tribal delegation. This was denied by a Ministry of Interior official, who said that Rajab's release was discussed during negotiations but was rejected by the Houthis. Analysts believed the move to be a ploy by the Houthis in order to garner a better reputation from the tribes of southern Yemen in order to capitalize on dissatisfaction with the government.

== Post-release ==
In April 2024, Rajab was awarded the September 26 Medal and was ceremoniously promoted to Lieutenant General by Presidential Leadership Council head Rashad al-Alimi.

Rajab condemned the 28 August 2025 Israeli attacks on Yemen, which killed several ministers from the Houthi-led government, writing in a Twitter statement: "Anyone who rejoices over what happened in Sana'a must review his faith and Yemeni identity." The message was noted by Jacobin as being "far more in tune with popular perceptions" than the more muted response from the internationally-recognized government.
