= Aftermath of the Houthi takeover of Yemen =

After seizing the capital in September 2014, the Houthis obtained the resignations of President Abdrabbuh Mansur Hadi, Prime Minister Khaled Bahah, and the cabinet in January 2015 and then moved to dissolve parliament and instated the Supreme Revolutionary Committee to govern their territory of Yemen on 6 February 2015. However, despite their military successes and an alleged alliance with the former ruling General People's Congress, the Houthis faced widespread domestic and international opposition to the coup and they assented to United Nations–led talks on a power-sharing deal. At least one analyst went so far as to suggest the Houthis' declaration "fizzled" in the days after it was announced, although they have Ali Abdullah Saleh's political support.

On 21 February 2015, one month after Houthi militants confined him to his residence in Sanaa, Hadi slipped out of the capital and traveled to Aden, the capital of the former People's Democratic Republic of Yemen. In a televised address from his hometown, he declared that the Houthi takeover was illegitimate and indicated he remained the constitutional president of Yemen. Hadi's ex-ministers were released by the Houthis on 16 March as a "goodwill gesture". On 21 March, Hadi officially proclaimed Aden to be the temporary capital of Yemen, until his pledged recapture of Sana'a. Within days, however, a Houthi-led military campaign wrested much of southern Yemen from Hadi's loyalists, prompting Hadi to flee his presidential palace in Aden and Saudi Arabia to launch airstrikes against Houthi positions throughout the country.

== Background ==
The Houthis took control of much of northern Yemen by mid-2014. After President Hadi announced an unpopular cut to fuel subsidies, Abdul-Malik al-Houthi called for demonstrations. In September 2014, the protests gave way to full-blown fighting between Houthi militants and army forces loyal to General Ali Mohsen al-Ahmar in the capital city of Sana'a. The Houthis achieved a swift victory, forcing the government to the bargaining table. In addition to rolling back the fuel subsidy cuts, they also obtained the resignation of Prime Minister Mohammed Basindawa and significant control over the formation of a new "unity government" and constitution-drafting process.

In January 2015, Houthi forces assaulted the presidential palace and private residence of Hadi, placing the president and his ministers under virtual house arrest while demanding further concessions. Hadi and his cabinet resigned on 22 January. Three weeks later, on 6 February, the Houthis declared the House of Representatives defunct and named a Revolutionary Committee led by Mohammed Ali al-Houthi as the acting authority in Yemen.

== Political developments ==
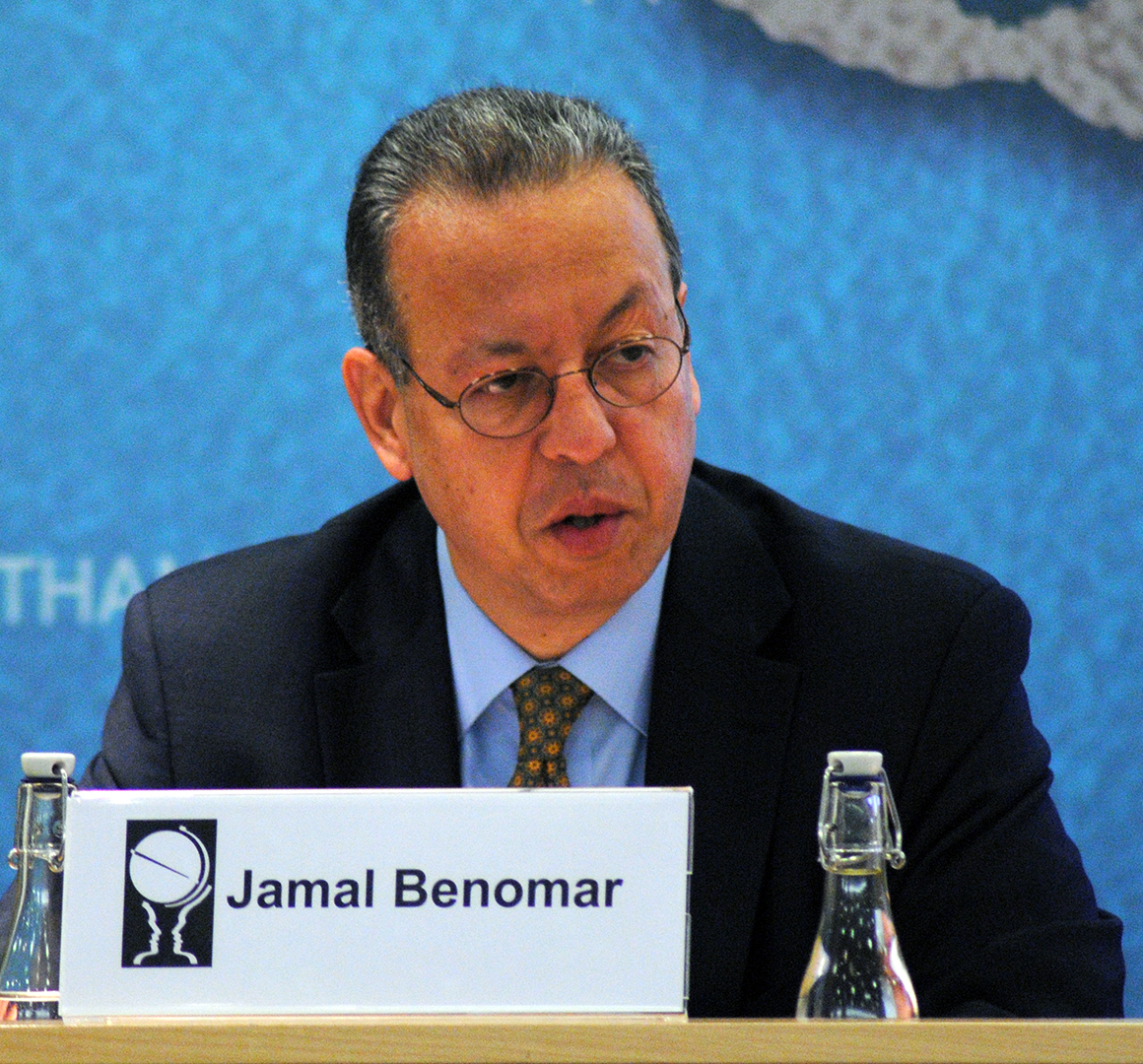
Jamal Benomar, the United Nations special envoy to Yemen.

=== In Sana'a ===
==== Cross-factional talks ====
UN envoy Jamal Benomar mediated talks between the Houthis and other major factions in Yemen after the "constitutional declaration". However, the talks were hampered after delegates from the Nasserist Unionist People's Organisation and Al-Islah reportedly walked out, claiming they were threatened by a Houthi representative. Benomar announced a tentative agreement on 20 February that included the continuation of the House of Representatives and the formation of a "people's transitional council" that would represent southerners, women, youth, and other minority groups.

On 28 February, the Southern Movement pulled out of negotiations on a political solution to the crisis. Hadi suggested moving the talks to Riyadh, the Saudi Arabian capital, instead of continuing to hold them in Houthi-controlled Sana'a. However, the Houthis and GPC rejected the idea. After Hadi refused to participate in the UN talks while the Houthis held Sana'a on 4 March, Houthi fighters seized the headquarters of the National Dialogue Conference, which Hadi had ordered to relocate to Aden.

==== Captive government officials ====
On 16 February, former Yemeni President Ali Abdullah Saleh's General People's Congress (GPC) said it would accept the Houthi decree dissolving parliament. The same day, Benomar and Nadia Al-Sakkaf reportedly visited Hadi, still under house arrest in Sana'a. Hadi escaped Sana'a and fled to Aden five days later.

On 22 February, the Houthis ordered ex-Prime Minister Khaled Bahah and the cabinet to return to work, but they refused. The group threatened to place them under arrest and criminally charge them if they did not change their minds. The Houthis also reportedly tried without success to get the House of Representatives to meet and formally approve Hadi's resignation. The GPC said it would not call for a vote on the resignation, while some smaller parties asserted that without parliamentary action, Hadi remained the "constitutional elected president". The Houthis called Hadi a "fugitive from justice" and said he had "lost his legitimacy to act as president". Both the Houthis and the GPC said they rejected Hadi's claim to be the legitimate president, despite a letter he sent to parliament formally rescinding his resignation. On 10 March, Ali Abdullah Saleh, the chairman of the General People's Congress, harshly criticised Hadi at a news conference in Sana'a. Saleh accused Hadi, his former vice president, of destroying the country and urged him to go into exile.

Mahmoud al-Subaihi, Yemen's defence minister, escaped from house arrest in Sana'a and traveled to Aden in early March. Bahah and his ministers were eventually released in a "goodwill gesture" on 16 March, although Bahah said he would not resume his post as prime minister.

=== In Aden ===
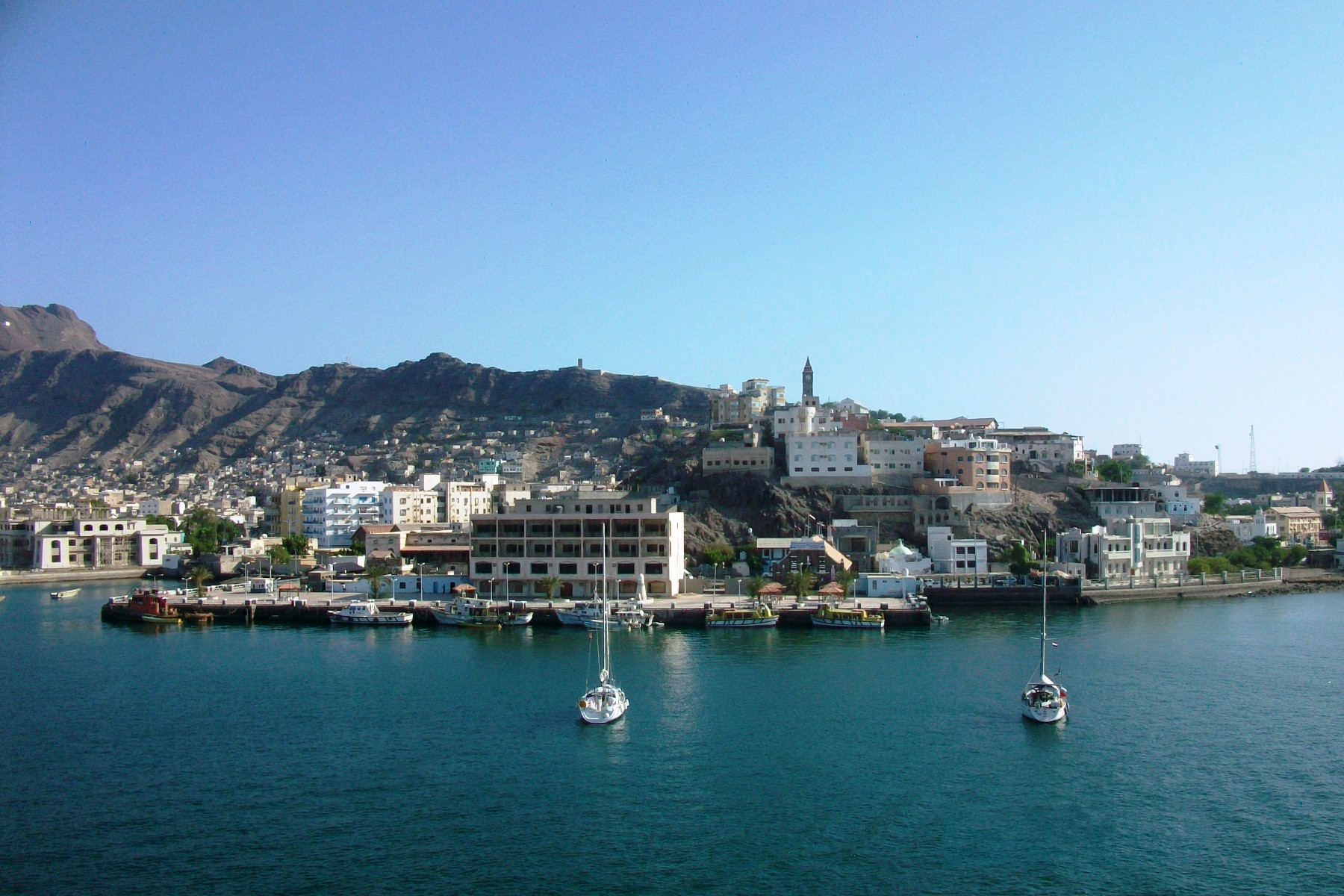
Aden became the southern refuge and temporary capital city for Abdrabbuh Mansur Hadi and his government in the aftermath of the Houthi takeover.

A number of members of the dissolved parliament met in Aden on 15 February and declared it to be Yemen's new capital due to the "occupation" of Sana'a. They also called on the Gulf Cooperation Council to intervene with force against the Houthis. The leaders of the Aden, Lahij, and Mahrah governorates declared a joint "administrative, security, and political leadership" opposing the Houthi takeover. Fighters under the command of Hadi's brother Nasser claimed to have seized Aden's TV station and several government buildings in the port city by 16 February, although Governor Abdel-Aziz bin Habtour denied the station had been taken over.

Hadi, the former president, reportedly traveled to Aden on 21 February. It was not immediately clear whether he evaded house arrest or was allowed to leave for the first time in a month, with some reports indicating that he escaped—in one telling, he disguised himself as a woman and stowed away on a food truck, while in another, he was freed by special forces—and others suggesting he was released as part of an agreement between the Houthis and other factions. Upon arriving in Aden, Hadi gave a televised address condemning the coup and saying all Houthi actions since 21 September 2014 were invalid and unconstitutional. He delivered the address under the title of president. In his speech, Hadi called for a resumption of the National Dialogue Conference in either Aden or Taiz, cities outside the Houthis' zone of control. The following day, he met with several southern governors. Bin Habtour said after the meeting that Hadi's intention was to "lead from Aden" and receive foreign delegations. An aide to Hadi said in early March that Hadi considered Aden to have become the country's capital after the Houthis occupied Sana'a. Hadi was soon joined by Defence Minister Mahmoud al-Subaihi, who abandoned his position as chairman of the Houthi-imposed Supreme Security Committee and decamped from Sana'a.

Although he established himself in Aden, Hadi was suspicious of Ali Abdullah Saleh loyalists and Houthi sympathisers even within his hometown. He issued a decree on 2 March reassigning General Abdul-Hafez al-Saqqaf from the Special Security Forces in Aden to a bureaucratic position. However, al-Saqqaf refused to comply with the decree, amid reports that he did not view Hadi as Yemen's legitimate president.

After an attack on Aden International Airport by al-Saqqaf's commandos, as well as a missile strike by a Houthi jet on his presidential palace, on 19 March, Hadi gave a televised address urging all factions to participate in mediated talks on the country's future in Riyadh and predicting that the Houthis' "Iranian agenda" would fail. On 21 March, he also officially declared Aden to be Yemen's "economic and temporary capital" due to the Houthi occupation of Sana'a, which he pledged would be retaken. Just days later, however, Hadi fled Aden as Houthi forces advanced on the city on 25 March. He arrived in Saudi Arabia the next day.

== Related unrest ==
=== Clashes ===
There were clashes in Rada'a leaving nine dead on 10 February after Houthi fighters attempted to take control of the city and encountered local resistance. Twenty-six were killed in clashes between Houthis and al Qaeda-aligned Sunni tribesmen in the southern Al Bayda' Governorate on 14 February. The jihadist group Ansar al-Sharia also took advantage of the power vacuum, capturing a military base in the Shabwah Governorate of southern Yemen.

The Houthis clashed again with tribesmen in Al Bayda' after demonstrations in support of Hadi in several cities on 27 February. Three separate al-Qaeda attacks in Al Bayda' Governorate left at least 27 Houthis dead and more injured on 3 March.

On 9 March, al-Qaeda in the Arabian Peninsula (AQAP) seized control of Al Mahfad in southern Yemen's Abyan Governorate for several hours. A counterattack by the army later that day forced them out of the town. Four soldiers and seven al Qaeda militants were reportedly killed in the fighting. AQAP seized the Al Hawtah District on 20 March, again just for a single day, but 29 soldiers were left dead in a mass killing while the city was under jihadist control. A branch of the Islamic State of Iraq and the Levant later claimed responsibility for the massacre.

Amid tension between the Houthis and several military commanders, Houthi fighters attacked the residence of General Mohammed Rajah Laboudha in Sana'a on 17 March, reportedly killing one guard and detaining two others.

Major fighting in Aden broke out on 19 March, leaving more than a dozen dead, after pro-Saleh troops stormed Aden International Airport. Hadi loyalists counterattacked, retaking the airport and capturing the base of a rebel general in the city.

=== Terrorism ===
Abdel-Karim al-Kheiwan, a Houthi leader, was shot dead in Sana'a on 18 March 2015. Al Qaeda said it carried out the assassination. Two days later, the Islamic State of Iraq and the Levant claimed responsibility for four suicide attacks against Shia mosques with primarily Houthi congregations in Sana'a. At least 142 people were killed.

=== Protests ===
After the Rada'a clashes on 10 February, the following day, anti-Houthi activists held major protests in Ta'izz and other cities. Houthi fighters fired on protesters in Ibb on 14 February, leaving four injured, and again on 21 February, killing an activist.

After Hadi's flight from Sana'a to Aden, thousands protested in support of the deposed president in the capital city on 22 February. A similar demonstration occurred in Ta'izz. Secessionists also rallied in Aden to oppose Hadi's call for unity and national dialogue, chanting that Hadi was "contemptible" for not backing southern independence.

Abdul-Malik al-Houthi called for "protests and demonstrations" against what he alleged was foreign interference on the part of Saudi Arabia and the United States on 26 February. On 10 March, thousands reportedly protested in Sana'a calling for Ahmed Saleh, son of former president Ali Abdullah Saleh, to be nominated to the presidency. A similar demonstration was held on 13 March, after pro-Saleh vehicles with loudspeakers reportedly broadcast messages throughout Sana'a urging residents to come out in support of Ahmed Saleh for the preceding two days.

== International response ==
=== Opposition ===
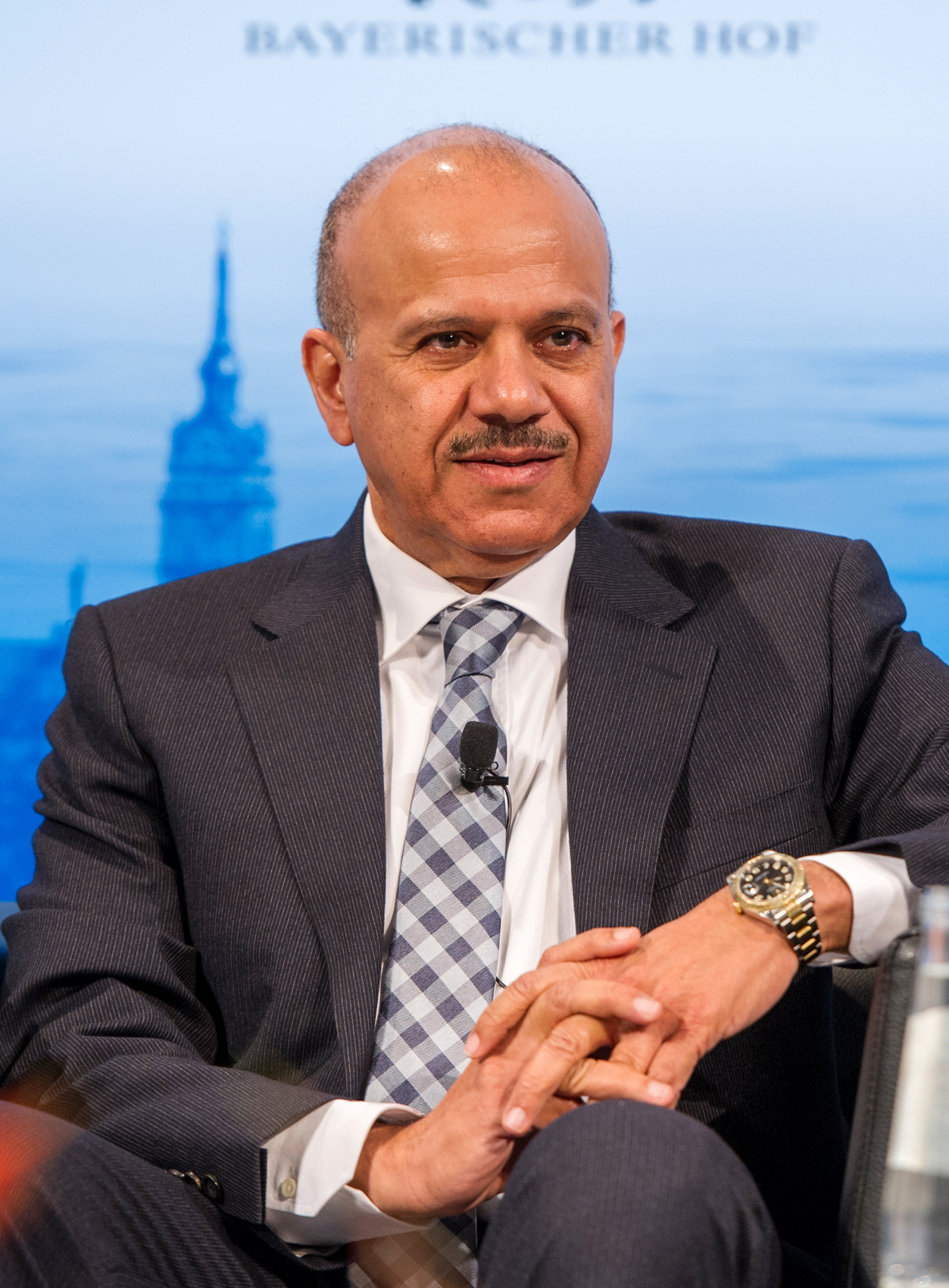
Abdulatif al-Zayani, secretary-general of the GCC, staunchly opposed the Houthi takeover, backing Hadi's claim to legitimacy.

International reactions to the Houthi takeover were generally negative, with the Gulf Cooperation Council, Arab League, European Union, United States, and United Nations all criticising the coup. The United States and United Kingdom moved swiftly to close their embassies and evacuate their ambassadors. France, Germany, Italy, Japan, the Netherlands, Saudi Arabia, Spain, Turkey, and the United Arab Emirates followed suit.

The United Nations Security Council unanimously adopted a resolution deploring the Houthi takeover and demanding that the group relinquish control of the government on 15 February 2015, although it stopped short of authorising military force. The GCC warned that if the UN did not act forcefully, its members would "take measures which enable them to maintain their vital interests in the security and stability of Yemen".

A Saudi delegation met with Hadi on 23 February, days after his escape to Aden. Aides to Hadi said the delegation informed him that Riyadh continued to recognise him as president. The GCC also called on the Yemeni people to support Hadi against the Houthis. Hadi also met with a GCC delegation, including Secretary-General Abdulatif al-Zayani. On 26 February, the Saudi ambassador to Yemen relocated his mission from Sana'a to Aden. Abdul-Malik al-Houthi responded by accusing Saudi Arabia of destabilising the country and financing those who "aim to hurt the people of Yemen". Bahrain, the United Arab Emirates, and Kuwait also announced they would relocate their embassies to Aden. On 10 March, al-Houthi claimed the Gulf states were working "to facilitate the atmosphere for al Qaeda in the southern provinces".

The United States reportedly withdrew the last of its special forces from Yemen in March 2015. The United Kingdom followed suit, with its remaining troops being airlifted out of Sana'a.

=== Support ===
The government of Iran praised the Houthi uprising as an extension of the Iranian Revolution, with President Hassan Rouhani stating that the Islamic Republic was supporting "peace and stability" in Yemen. On 28 February, Houthi-controlled state media announced that Iran and Yemen signed an agreement to open direct flight routes between the two countries. The following month, a Houthi spokesperson said the group had secured pledges from Iran to provide oil to Yemen, expand its ports, and construct power plants in the country.

=== Foreign involvement ===
==== Saudi Arabia ====
After Riad Yassin, Hadi's foreign minister, called on the Gulf Cooperation Council to assist the beleaguered government in Aden, Saudi Arabia began a military buildup on its border with Yemen in late March 2015, according to US intelligence. On 25 March, Saudi Arabia began launching airstrikes in Yemen. Yemeni Houthi rebels asks UN to stop Saudi Arabian strikes against them follow continued blatant aggression on Yemen by Saudi.

==== United States ====
According to Michael G. Vickers, U.S. Undersecretary of Defense for Intelligence, the United States established an intelligence relationship with the Houthis to counter Al-Qaeda in the Arabian Peninsula. The U.S. ambassador to Yemen, Matthew H. Tueller, met with Hadi after his escape to Aden and said the U.S. still viewed him as the "legitimate" president despite the Houthi takeover. However, the U.S. said it had no plans to relocate its shuttered embassy from Sana'a.

== Saudi intervention ==
After the Battle of Aden Airport and Sanaa mosque bombings, the Houthi Revolutionary Committee declared on 21 March a "state of general mobilisation", in light of the actions of the pro-Hadi Popular Committees and "terrorist elements".

On 22 March, the Houthis seized Taiz without resistance, although Houthi gunmen reportedly fired into the air to disperse protests against their takeover. The group took control of the military airbase in the city and reportedly flew troops and materiel into the airfield. The Houthi advance was assisted by forces loyal to Saleh. The next day, Houthi forces were dispatched to Mocha, a major port on the Bab-el-Mandeb strait.

The Houthi offensive advanced dramatically on 25 March, with the systematic falls of Al Anad Air Base, Lahij, and Aden International Airport and the reported capture of Defence Minister Mahmoud al-Subaihi by Houthi fighters. Amid disputed reports that Hadi fled the country, Yemeni Foreign Minister Riad Yassin called on Arab states to intervene in the country's crisis.

Shuqrah on the Arabian Sea, east of Aden, fell to the Houthis on 27 March, giving the militants control of all land entrances to Aden. Fighting was reported on the outskirts of the provisional capital itself. By the start of April, Houthi and allied military forces had pressed into central Aden, taking control of the presidential palace on 2 April.

=== Saudi-led air campaign ===
Later that day, the Gulf states made a joint announcement that they would mount a military intervention against the Houthis, al Qaeda, and Islamic State of Iraq and the Levant in Yemen. Saudi Arabia's ambassador to the United States announced the kingdom launched airstrikes against Houthi targets overnight. Egypt, Jordan, Morocco, and Sudan also joined the campaign, with Egyptian naval ships moving to block the Bab-el-Mandeb strait, and the United States declared it would provide intelligence and logistical support.

Hadi arrived in Riyadh on 26 March, reportedly by way of Oman. He was greeted by the Saudi defence minister, Mohammad bin Salman Al Saud.

== See also ==
- Outline of the Yemeni Crisis, revolution, and civil war (2011-present)
