= Battle of Aden (2015) =

Battle of the Yemeni Civil War

- Part of the Yemeni Civil War (2014–present) and the Saudi Arabian-led intervention in Yemen
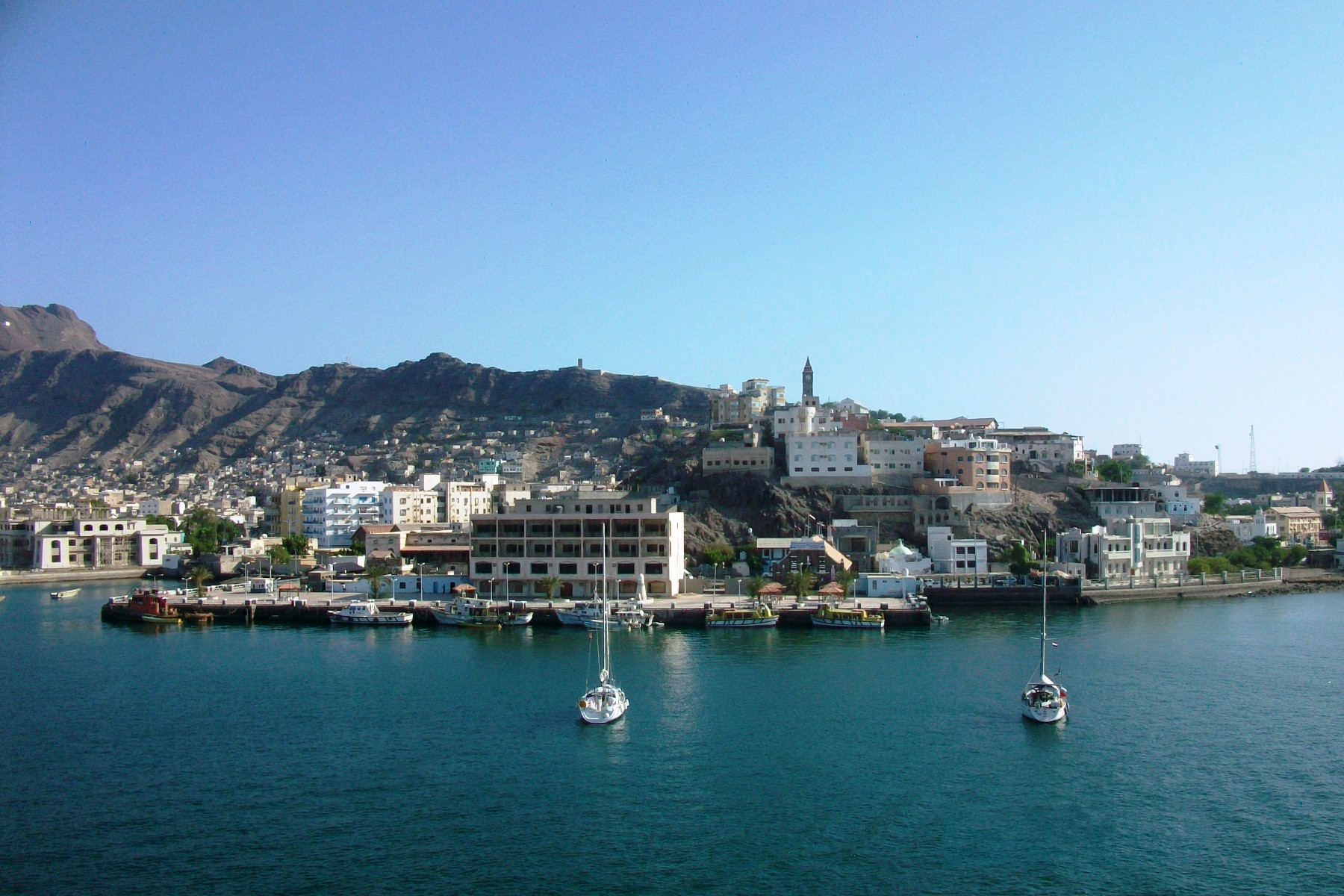
- View of Aden from the sea
Date	25 March – 22 July 2015 (3 months, 3 weeks and 6 days)
Location	Aden, Yemen 12.8°N 45.033333°E
Result	Hadi-led government and coalition victory

Belligerents
Houthis	Yemeni government Support: Saudi Arabia (leader); United Arab Emirates; Bahrain; Egypt; Jordan; Kuwait; Morocco; Qatar; Sudan

Commanders and leaders
(Houthis) Mohammed Ali al-Houthi (Houthis) Abdul-Malik al-Houthi (Houthis) Hussein Khairan (Houthis) Ali al-Shami (Houthis) Abdul-Khaliq al-Houthi (POW); Ali Abdullah Saleh; Abdul-Hafez al-Saqqaf	(Yemen) Abdrabbuh Mansour Hadi (in exile) (Yemen) Gen. Aidarus al-Zoubaidi (Yemen) Colonel Mohammed Hussein Al-Khaili Al-Shaibi (Yemen) Gen. Shallal Ali Sha'ya (Yemen) Maj. Gen. Jaafar Mohammed Saad (Yemen) Brig. Gen. Saif al-Baqri (Yemen) Brig. Gen. Ali Nasser Hadi † (Cooperation Council for the Arab States of the Gulf) Abdullatif bin Rashid Al Zayani (Saudi Arabia) King Salman

Units involved
(Houthis) Houthi tribal militia Yemeni Armed Forces (pro-Saleh factions): Republican Guard; Special Security Forces	(Yemen) Loyalist coalition: Yemeni Armed Forces (pro-Hadi factions); People's Committees; Popular resistance; Southern Movement; Saudi Arabian Armed Forces (alleged); United Arab Emirates Armed Forces

Casualties and losses
380–396 killed	215 killed
- 858 civilians killed (256 by disease; pro-Hadi claim); 783 civilians and pro-Hadi fighters killed (U.N. claim); 590 deaths from dengue fever (U.N. claim)
- Location within Yemen

The Battle of Aden was a nearly four-month battle in 2015 for the control of Aden, Yemen, between Houthi rebels and Yemen Army forces loyal to Ali Abdullah Saleh on one side, and Yemen Army units loyal to Abdrabbuh Mansur Hadi and Southern Movement militias on the other side.

The battle began on 25 March 2015, as pro-Saleh troops seized control of Aden International Airport and Hadi fled the country by boat. On 16 July the pro-Hadi forces again seized control of Aden port and were moving into the city's commercial center. On 22 July, pro-Hadi forces had retaken full control of Aden, and the Aden Airport was reopened. In late July, an offensive launched by pro-Hadi forces drove Houthi forces out of the towns neighboring Aden.

== Background ==
The Houthis, allegedly with the support of former president Ali Abdullah Saleh, took control of the Yemeni government in a takeover. President Hadi was placed under virtual house arrest, but after a month, he managed to escape to his hometown of Aden in Yemen's south.

After fighting over the airport broke out in Aden on 19 March and Sanaa was hit by a suicide bombing attack the following day, the Houthi Revolutionary Committee formed to govern the country after the coup declared a state of "general mobilisation". With the support of some army elements, the Houthis launched an offensive to take control of the south and defeat Hadi's holdouts. Yemen's third-largest city of Taiz fell with little resistance, followed by Lahij and the strategic Al Anad Air Base north of Aden.

== Battle ==
=== Fighting begins ===
On 25 March, fighting spread to Aden, as army units loyal to Saleh captured Aden International Airport and a nearby airbase after clashes with pro-Hadi Southern Movement fighters. The airport suspended all flights. Civilians stormed an army base in central Aden in an attempt to seize weapons, leaving five dead and 12 wounded. Houthi fighters pressing from the north reached the outskirts of the port city.

Hadi fled Aden by boat. His whereabouts were not known until 26 March, when he landed in Saudi Arabia hours after the kingdom began an air campaign to defeat the Houthis.

By 27 March, Houthi and allied army units had encircled Aden, taking control of all land routes into and out of the city. However, warplanes from the Saudi-led coalition began to bedevil the Houthis as they moved their heavy armour and vehicles toward Aden, with airstrikes halting a convoy from Shuqrah early on 28 March.

Also on 28 March, several people were killed in a series of explosions at an arms depot in Aden, amid looting by residents after the depot's guards abandoned their posts. By this point, the death toll in Aden, since fighting in the city started, had reached 75 people.

=== Clashes intensify ===
Map of the pro-Houthi attack on Aden Houthi control Pro-Hadi control

Clashes in Aden continued on 29 March, as fighting continued in northern Aden and the Houthis pushed into central Aden. Forces loyal to Hadi reportedly retook Aden International Airport, with nine Houthi fighters and five pro-Hadi fighters among the dead.

The Houthis and Saleh-loyal military units continued their attack on Aden on 30 March, firing artillery and rockets against the city near the Alam roundabout and attempting to advance deeper into it. Houthis fighters reportedly came under fire from Egyptian warships, which shelled their positions from off the southern coast. At least two airstrikes forced them to retreat toward Zinjibar, and the Popular Committees loyal to Hadi held their ground. Saudi planes also struck near Aden International Airport. At least 36 were killed by shelling and airstrikes, with 26 dying in artillery fire on the Khormaksar district of Aden, including 10 in a residential building reportedly taken over by fighters loyal to Hadi.

Houthi fighters retook parts of Aden International Airport and clashed with pro-Hadi fighters across the city on 1 April. Even so, an aide to Hadi expressed confidence that the Aden government could defeat the ground assault without the help of foreign troops if the Houthis' supply lines were cut. Houthi positions at the airport were reportedly shelled by coalition warships. Later, Houthi and allied Army units advanced in a tank column into Aden's Khormaksar district and the city center, where they battled with pro-Hadi troops and local residents for control.

=== Battle for central districts ===
The following day, Houthi and allied fighters took control of the central Crater neighbourhood, backed by tanks and armored vehicles. They also took control of the presidential palace, although overnight air raids prompted them to make a tactical withdrawal. The Houthis temporarily retreated from the Crater district as well, losing two tanks and 10 fighters. Coalition planes airdropped weapons and medical aid to Aden's defenders.

However, on 5 April, the Houthi advance resumed. The group again retook central neighbourhoods and bombarded others, but were pushed back when they attempted to move toward the city's port. According to a pro-Hadi militia, 36 Houthi and allied fighters were killed in clashes in Aden's Mualla district, while 11 pro-Hadi fighters died. A medic said Houthi snipers took up positions on rooftops in the area.

On 6 April, the Houthis and allied army units made their largest push yet, attacking holdouts in the Mualla district. Pro-Hadi fighters claimed three hostile tanks destroyed overnight, but the Houthis deployed additional tanks to the area by morning. Medical facilities in the city were reportedly overwhelmed, bodies cluttered the streets, and a number of buildings were set on fire. The Red Cross warned of a "catastrophic" humanitarian situation as fighting continued. Eighteen died in fighting overnight into 7 April, with 53 killed over the previous 24 hours.

Dozens of Houthi fighters and allied troops pushed into the Crater district on 8 April, backed by a tank and two armoured vehicles. Residents said three arms depots under the control of the Houthis or pro-Saleh troops were bombed by aircraft in northern Aden on the same day. Sunni mosques in the city reportedly called residents to jihad against the city's attackers. The push into Crater was reportedly mostly repulsed by mid-afternoon, and Houthi fighters were also cleared from some northern neighbourhoods. As fighting persisted, Saudi-led coalition warships blasted Houthi positions from offshore on 10 April. The extent of the damage from the naval bombardment was not immediately clear. Reuters reported on 11 April that two Quds Force officers from Iran were captured in separate districts by militiamen defending the city from the Houthis. By 13 April, the presidential palace complex was once again under Houthi control, but being hit by air-strikes.

On 14 April, after prolonged clashes, Houthi fighters withdrew from Aden's Khormaksar district—the location of the international airport and foreign missions.

Coalition warships bombarded Houthi-occupied buildings as fighting raged in the Mualla, Crater, and Buraiga districts on 18 April. Fighting in the Buraiga district centered on control of the city's only refinery.

On 17 April, pro-Hadi fighters from Lahj and Al Anad Air Base launched an assault towards the south and gained ground along the coastline from Houthi and pro-Saleh forces by 19 April, allowing them to assault the airport, which was still in the militants' hands. Pro-Hadi forces also recaptured the Russian consulate and a Hadi residence. As of 20 April, Hadi forces reportedly also seized the airport.

On 28 April, Houthi forces, that took up positions at the University of Aden and the hospital in the Khormaksar district, advanced in the area and captured Hadi's family home and the German and Russian consulates. Just north of the peninsula, they also pushed west in an attempt to retake territory previously lost. The next day, the Houthis advanced towards the city center. A large shopping mall in Khormaksar reportedly caught fire amid fighting as the Houthis advanced through the neighbourhood, repulsing counter-attacks there and in the Mualla district. Eyewitnesses told the Associated Press that the Houthi fighters and their allies searched house to house in Khormaksar, dragging some men out onto the street and shooting them, while warning residents by loudspeaker against harbouring anti-Houthi fighters.

On 6 May, Houthi forces captured the Tawahi district, but were later reportedly expelled from the area. The fighting killed pro-Hadi Brigadier General Ali Nasser Hadi, who was then replaced by Brigadier General Saif al-Baqri. Houthi shells also struck a boat loaded with refugees attempting to flee Aden on 6 May, killing 40.

=== Anti-Houthi counteroffensive ===
Map of pro-Hadi counterattack Houthi control Pro-Hadi control

On 14 July, pro-Hadi militia in Aden retook Aden International Airport and cleared the Khormaksar district of Houthi rebels following the collapse of a humanitarian truce. As a result, this left the Houthis trapped in the peninsula. By 16 July pro-Hadi forces had retaken large parts of the port area of Mualla near Aden and entered the commercial district of Crater. On July 17, pro-Hadi militias and the government in exile said that they had "liberated" Aden from the Houthis. Despite that, the Houthis still controlled the Eastern and Northern entrances to the city and pockets of fighting were reported. Anti-Houthi forces continued to press on with their offensive by capturing two military bases, one of them in the Lahij Province and the other in the eastern Shabwa province. According to Medecins Sans Frontieres, retreating Houthis killed about 100 people in a single mortar barrage.

After the last Houthi forces were driven from the city, the first aircraft to land at Aden’s reopened airport, on July 22, was a Saudi military transport bringing aid, weapons and the commander of the Saudi navy.

== Aftermath ==
On 30 July, anti-Houthi forces launched an offensive outside of Aden and drove the Houthis from Muthalath al-Ilm, the Ya'wala, Al-Basateen, and Qariat al-Falahi neighbourhoods, and clashed with Houthi fighters in the Lahij province. The militias captured more territory from the Houthis on the following day, including the town of Houta with support from the Saudi airstrikes.

On 3 August, Hadi loyalists, backed by Saudi and UAE ground forces, advanced to the north of Aden and successfully recaptured the Al Anad Air Base.

Major General Jaafar Mohammed Saad, who played a prominent role in planning the operation that pushed pro-Houthi fighters out of Aden in July, was appointed as Governor of Aden in October 2015. However, his tenure proved short-lived; he was assassinated in a bombing allegedly perpetrated by the Islamic State of Iraq and the Levant on 6 December 2015.

== Combatants ==
As of 10 April, The New York Times reported, most of Aden's defenders were residents who took up arms against the invaders, forming loosely organised militias to protect their own neighbourhoods. The militiamen include supporters of the separatist Southern Movement. Many of Hadi's loyalists deserted earlier in the battle, after their president fled the country. By contrast, the bulk of the attacking force was composed of troops and militiamen loyal to Saleh, with Houthis making up a minority. Many of the Houthi fighters captured during the fighting reportedly had been told they were in Aden to fight al-Qaeda.

== Foreign role ==
=== Humanitarian ===
Several countries moved to evacuate their citizens from Aden as the fighting worsened. China's People's Liberation Army Navy evacuated several hundred, including hundreds of non-Chinese citizens, from Aden in early April. A Turkish frigate also evacuated 55 Turks from the city. The INS Mumbai, an Indian Navy destroyer, evacuated 441 Indian and other foreign nationals from Aden to Djibouti on 4 April.

On 8 April, Medecins Sans Frontiers and the International Committee of the Red Cross were successful in delivering 2.5 tonnes of medicine and a surgical team, respectively, by boat to Aden. The surgical team was deployed to a local hospital. On 21 July 2015, the first ship carrying aid from the World Food Programme docked in Aden, carrying enough food to last 180,000 people a month. The ship had waited at sea for four months, unable to dock because of fighting in the port area.

=== Military ===
Egyptian warships shelled Houthi positions as they advanced on critical points in Aden, and coalition warplanes repeatedly struck the attackers, as well as installations they seized.

Saudi Arabia reportedly inserted special forces troops into Aden, which a Saudi official told CNN were "coordinating and guiding" resistance to the Houthis and their allies. The Saudi government declined to officially comment on whether it had commandos on the ground in Aden. On 3 May, a small force of no more than 50 fighters from at least three Arab countries reportedly landed near Aden International Airport and took up arms against troops loyal to Saleh. A spokesman for the Saudi-led coalition denied that "foreign forces" were in Aden. Hadi's foreign minister said the fighters were Yemeni special forces troops retrained outside the country and sent back into Aden.

Anti-Houthi militiamen claimed to have captured an Iranian colonel and captain in the Quds Force, a special division of the Iranian Revolutionary Guards, during fighting in Aden in April. They said the Iranians were working as "advisors" to the Houthi militias and would be turned over to the coalition.
