= 2021 Anad airbase attack =

- Part of Yemeni civil war (2014-present)
- Location: Al Anad Air Base, Lahij Governorate, Yemen
- Date: August 29, 2021
- Target: Third Brigade of the al-Amaliqa brigades of the Southern Movement
- Attack type: Drone and missile
- Deaths: 40+
- Injuries: 65+
- Perpetrator: Houthis

On August 29, 2021, Houthi militants carried out a missile and drone attack on Al Anad Air Base, used by the Southern Movement. The attack killed over 40 Yemeni soldiers and injured over 60 more.

== Background ==
Al Anad Air Base is the largest air base in Yemen, and had been targeted several times by the Houthis since the start of the Yemeni civil war. The base is located in Lahij Governorate, and has been under government and allied Southern Movement control since August 2015. In 2019, an attack by the Houthis on the airbase killed the head of the Yemeni Intelligence Agency and killed and injured several Yemeni soldiers.

== Attack ==
At the time of the attack, Yemeni soldiers of the Third Brigade of the al-Amaliqa Brigades of the Southern Movement were doing morning exercises. Houthi media stated that three missiles and drones struck the airbase, and witnesses stated that the scene was chaotic following the strike as soldiers carried their wounded comrades away in anticipation of another attack. Houthi missiles and drones also attacked other parts of the city of Anad.

A spokesman for the Yemeni government said that at least thirty soldiers were killed in the attack and sixty were injured, and that the death toll was likely to rise. Houthi media stated that over 40 soldiers were killed and at least 65 were injured. Medical sources in the area said they received bodies and sixteen wounded, although they did not say whether civilians were injured or killed.
