= Nasser Mansour Hadi =

Yemeni lieutenant general (born 1947)

- ناصر منصور هادي
- Born: Nasser Mansour Hadi; 1947 (age 78–79); Azan, Al Wade'a District, Abyan, Aden Protectorate
- Relatives: Abdrabbuh Mansour Hadi (brother)
- Military career
- Allegiance: Yemen
- Branch: Yemeni Armed Forces
- Rank: Lieutenant general
- Conflicts: South Yemeni crisis Yemeni Civil War (1994); Yemeni Civil War (2014–present): Lahij insurgency (POW)

Nasser Mansour Hadi (Arabic: ناصر منصور هادي; born 1947) is a Yemeni security and military commander who previously served as deputy of the Political Security Organization in the governorates of Aden Governorate, Lahij, and Abyan. He is the brother of former Yemeni president Abdrabbuh Mansour Hadi.

== Early life and education ==
Nasser Mansour Hadi was born in the village of Azan, Al Wade'a district, Abyan Governorate.

He received his primary and secondary education at Al-Khudira School and Teachers' House in the city of Zinjibar, the capital of Abyan Governorate, and then moved to the Soviet Union to study military science.

== Military career ==
After returning from the Soviet Union in 1970, Hadi joined the ministry of interior in the People's Democratic Republic of Yemen before the unification of Yemen. He rose through the ranks after the unification of Yemen, and served as commander of the Special Forces in Aden Governorate, member of the Security Committee for Aden Governorate, and Deputy Director of the Political Security Organization for Aden, Lahij, and Abyan Governorates.

On 9 May 2024, he was promoted by Rashad al-Alimi, chairman of the Presidential Leadership Council, to the rank of lieutenant general and awarded the 26 September Medal, First Class, at the presidential palace in the interim capital, Aden.

== Wars and battles ==
In 1986 Hadi fought in the South Yemeni crisis alongside President Ali Nasir Muhammad and the war ended with the displacement of President Ali Nasser and his faction, including Hadi, to the Yemen Arab Republic.

In 1994 Hadi fought in the Yemeni Civil War alongside supporters of Yemeni unification led by President Ali Abdullah Saleh against secessionists led by Vice President Ali Salem al-Beidh, and the war ended with the victory of Ali Abdullah Saleh, and he was then appointed commander of the special forces in Aden Governorate.

=== Yemeni civil war (2014–present) ===
In 2015 he participated in the Yemeni civil war alongside his brother President Abdrabbuh Mansour Hadi against the Houthis and former president Ali Abdullah Saleh. The Houthi and Saleh faction captured Nasser in the same year, along with the then Minister of Defense, Major General Mahmoud al-Subaihi and Major General Faisal Rajab, commander of the Fourth Military Region, following a battle that took place at the Al Anad Air Base in Lahij Governorate. He remained a prisoner for eight years and was released from captivity on 14 April 2023 in a prisoner exchange sponsored by the United Nations and the International Committee of the Red Cross between the Houthis and the internationally recognized Yemeni government.
