= Am Juhar =

- Village
- Location in Yemen
- Coordinates: 12°41′45″N 44°17′18″E
- Country: Yemen
- Governorate: Lahij Governorate

Am Juhar is a small village near the coast in the Lahij Governorate of south-western Yemen. It is located 96.6 km east by road from Hisn Murad and 101 kilometres west of Aden. The village is primarily agricultural with a delta of wadis in the area and fields. Qawah is one of the nearest settlements to the southeast.
