= Al Bahiyah =

- Village
- Location in Yemen
- Coordinates: 12°38′17″N 43°57′26″E
- Country: Yemen
- Governorate: Lahij Governorate
- Time zone: UTC+6.30 (MST)

Al Bahiyah is a small village near the coast in the Lahij Governorate of south-western Yemen. It is located 54.4 km east by road from Hisn Murad.
