= Mahmoud al-Subaihi =

Yemeni lieutenant general and politician (born 1948)

- محمود الصبيحي
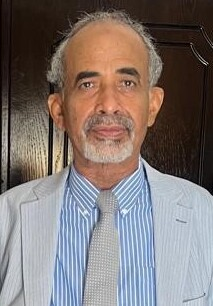
- Subaihi in 2024

Advisor to the Presidential Leadership Council
- Incumbent
- Assumed office 12 May 2014
- President: Rashad al-Alimi
- Prime Minister: Ahmad Awad bin Mubarak; Salem Saleh bin Braik

Minister of Defense
- Disputed (Note: Tenure as Minister of Defense disputed by Hussein Khairan and Mohamed al-Atifi)
- In office 8 November 2014 – 8 November 2018 (Note: Subaihi was captured by the Houthis on 25 March 2015. From thereon until his dismissal on 8 November 2018, he was still the de jure Minister of Defense in the Hadi administration, but the office was effectively vacant.)
- President: Abdrabbuh Mansur Hadi
- Prime Minister: Abdullah Mohsen al-Akwa; Khaled Bahah; Ahmed Obeid bin Daghr; Maeen Abdulmalik Saeed
- Deputy: Saleh Ali
- Preceded by: Mohammed Nasser Ahmed
- Succeeded by: Mohammed Ali al-Maqdashi

Personal details
- Born: 1948 (age 77–78) Huwaireb, Al-Mudharabah wa al-Arah district, Sultanate of Lahej
- Party: General People's Congress
- Education: Aden Military College; Frunze Military Academy

Military service
- Allegiance: South Yemen (1960s–1990); Yemen (1990–present)
- Branch/service: Yemen Army
- Years of service: 1960s–present
- Rank: Lieutenant general
- Battles/wars: Yemeni civil war (1994); Al-Qaeda insurgency in Yemen; Battle of Zinjibar (2011–2012); Operation Golden Swords; Yemeni civil war (2014–present); Battle of Aden Airport; Lahij insurgency (POW)

Mahmoud Ahmed Salem al-Subaihi (Note: Arabic: مَحْمُوُد أَحْمَد سالِم الصُّبَيْحي, romanized: Maḥmūd ʾAḥmad Sālim aṣ-Ṣubayḥī) (born 1948) is a Yemeni military officer currently serving as an advisor to the chairman of the Presidential Leadership Council for Defense and Security Affairs. He was previously appointed Minister of Defense in President Abdrabbuh Mansur Hadi's government in November 2014 before resigning along with most other government officials in January 2015 in response to the Houthi takeover of Yemen.

== Biography ==
=== Early life and career ===
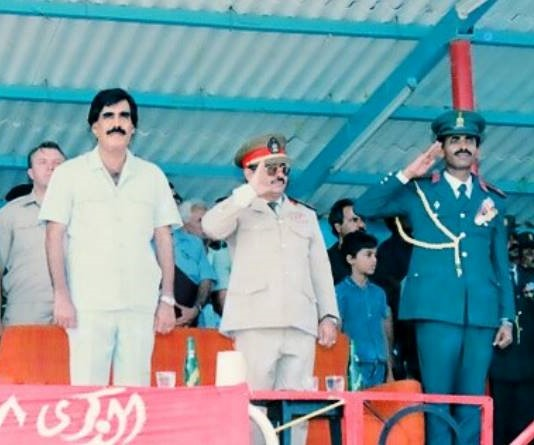
Subaihi (right) alongside then-President of South Yemen Ali Salem al-Beidh.

Subaihi was born in 1948 in Huwaireb, a town in Al-Mudharabah wa al-Arah district of Lahij. Huwaireb has been noted as the birthplace of numerous military and political figures in Yemen's history whilst also being one of the poorest areas in south. Growing up during the rule of the British-backed sultanate, Subaihi was aligned with tribal loyalties as were most Yemenis at the time. He grew more interested in the revolutionaries who had established South Yemen, motivating him to move to Aden and join the military. He progressed through the ranks from a young age, eventually earning a bachelor's degree in military science from the Aden Military College in 1976. From that year until 1978, he served as the Director of the Office at the Ministry of Defense under renowned defense minister Ali Antar, through which Subahi acquired experience from him. Subaihi then studied abroad at the Frunze Military Academy in the Soviet Union from 1978 to 1982, receiving a master's degree in military science from the academy. He completed another course at the college in 1988.

After returning to South Yemen, Subahi served as chief of staff of the Mulham Brigade, based in the Bayhan district of Shabwah, from 1982 to 1986. He then assumed a role as commander of the 25th Mechanized Brigade from 1986 to 1988. Subaihi avoided the South Yemen crisis of January 1986 and continued with his military education, returning to the Frunze Military Academy to complete a command and staff course in 1988. That same year, he was promoted to Staff Officer and named the director of the Aden Military College, remaining in the position until the unification of Yemen in 1990.

=== Civil war and exile ===
In unified Yemen, where he moved to the capital of Sanaa, Subaihi served as the deputy director of the Yemeni Military College from 1990 to 1993, established from the merging of the Aden Military College and Sanaa War College of the former North Yemen. Later in 1993, he was again appointed the commander of the 25th Mechanized Brigade. Subaihi supported Vice President Ali Salem al-Beidh's declaration of southern secession in 1994, with him and his unit fighting alongside the southerners during the Yemeni civil war.

Upon the capture of Aden by northern forces and the defeat of the southerners, Subaihi alongside many other secessionist leaders fled to Oman. For the next 15 years, Subaihi lived in exile from Yemen, moving past military life while shifting between several Gulf states. After Oman, he moved to the city of Jubail in Saudi Arabia, where he worked as a document copyist, a taxi driver, and a delivery person. He then, using his familiarity with the Russian language, attained a job at a Russian company in Dubai. He eventually moved from the United Arab Emirates to Kuwait, where he worked as a cashier.

=== Resumed military career ===
Subaihi returned to Yemen in 2009 following mediation with a former military officer who was a close friend to President Ali Abdullah Saleh. At the time of Subaihi's return, the military was in dire need of officers to replace those who had retired or were deemed corrupt. Subaihi resumed his military career in Yemen, being appointed an advisor to the Supreme Commander of the Armed Forces and promoted to major general in 2010. In March 2011, Subaihi was appointed the commander of the al-Anad Axis and the 201st Mechanised Brigade.

Subaihi participated in the army campaign against al-Qaeda in the Arabian Peninsula-linked militants during 2011 as they seized territory in the southern Abyan Governorate. As commander of the al-Anad Axis in Lahij Governorate, he had oversight of the strategic al-Anad Air Base in the regional capital of al-Hawtah, which saw usage by the United States military. Forces under Subaihi's command played a significant part in a military offensive in June 2012 which pushed AQAP forces out of the territory they had captured in the south. Unidentified gunmen attempted to assassinate him attempt near the intelligence headquarters in al-Hawtah on 2 December, but failed to harm him before they were captured by security forces.

=== 4th Military Region ===
As part of the restructuring process of the military under President Abdrabbuh Mansour Hadi, Subaihi was appointed the first commander of the 4th Military Region in a series of decrees issued on 10 April 2013. In this role, he was in charge of leading a 2014 military offensive against AQAP in Abyan and Shabwah governorates in response to intelligence reports of AQAP intending to take over the town of Lawdar. He arrived in Lawdar on 27 April 2014 to meet with local officials from the Popular Committees and the military commander in charge of Abyan. The offensive began a day later. An AQAP ambush on a military convoy near Azzan on 29 April which left 15 soldiers dead was alleged to have targeted Subaihi, although he was not harmed. As army forces made continued advances in the governorates, Subaihi announced a 48-hour grace period late on 5 May for AQAP militants to surrender before the army would enter the Wadi Daiqa area.

Within ten days of the commencement of the offensive, al-Mahfad district of Abyan was declared liberated from AQAP control. The success of the campaign brung Subaihi to prominence in Yemen. According to Al-Araby Al-Jadeed, officials from the US requested a meeting with Subaihi after the offensive. During a visit to al-Mahfad on 9 June, Subaihi said that operations against AQAP would continue across all of Yemen, and that the military would prepare to attack further hideouts of the group in other locations. He also reportedly "clarified that the military will not simply be expanding to other provinces in Yemen. He said his Mahfad visit comes as part of an operational deployment plan to get boots on the ground in areas that had already been deemed cleared of AQAP militants."

=== Minister of Defense ===
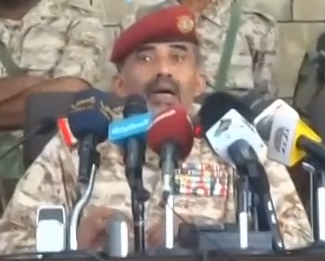
Subaihi at a press conference with Houthi officials in October 2014.

After the Houthis took over Sanaa in September 2014, President Hadi, in need of a trusted and universally respected defence minister, appointed Subaihi as minister of defense in his 7 November cabinet shuffle, which was meant as an attempt to defuse tensions in the nation. Subaihi's appointment has retrospectively been seen as a mistake on the part of Hadi, as his previous position as Fourth Military Region commander would have kept him safe in Aden as opposed to residing in the Houthi-controlled territory which was the capital. On 24 November, he stated that the Houthis would be integrated into the Yemeni Armed Forces after a government delegation had paid an unannounced visit to Houthi leadership to discuss a plan.

On 22 January 2015, Subaihi along with nearly all other members of the cabinet of Yemen, along with President Hadi, resigned in protest after the Houthis put Hadi under virtual house arrest. The Houthis subsequently besieged Subaihi's house in the following days. On 6 February, the Houthis announced that Subaihi would be the head of the 18-member Supreme Security Committee. He along with former Interior Minister Jalal al-Rowaishan were seen present at an announcement for plans of a new government. His presence at the announcement received suspicion from his political allies, some suggesting that he was forced to attend it. According to Al Jazeera, Subaihi's appointment was viewed simply as a symbolic gesture by many Yemenis since true military power was already vested in the Houthis by then.

On 7 March, Subaihi fled Sanaa in an overnight escape, two weeks after Hadi had done so to reach Aden. Initial reports claimed that Subaihi had traveled to Aden, however he later confirmed that he was in Lahij Governorate. Subaihi effectively became Hadi's de-facto minister of defense, commanding army forces loyal to the internationally-recognized Hadi-led government during the Battle of Aden Airport on 19 March and repelling Houthi-allied Saleh loyalists before capturing an adjacent military base. Subaihi was leading the counter-offensive against the Houthis in Lahij Governorate.

On 21 March, the Houthis appointed defected military chief of staff Hussein Khairan as acting Minister of Defense, who would control military units allied to them. They stated that "al-Subaihi is no longer the defense minister and any role he plays in that capacity is illegitimate," though he still retained his position in the Hadi-government.

On 25 March, a Houthi spokesperson announced that Subaihi, alongside pro-government 119th Armored Brigade commander Faisal Rajab and former intelligence chief and Hadi's brother Nasser Mansour Hadi, had been captured near al-Anad Air Base in the city of Lahij as Houthi forces were advancing towards Aden. Subaihi nominally remained defense minister in the Hadi-government, but the position was de facto vacant as a result of his detention.

=== Detention and release ===
On 26 October 2018, the Omani government released a statement announcing that it had reached a deal with the Houthis allowing Subaihi to contact his family. The announcement was the first update on Subaihi's status since he was captured by the Houthis. On 8 November 2018, more than three years after his capture, Subaihi was officially replaced as Minister of Defense by then-military chief of staff Mohammed Ali al-Maqdashi.

On 14 April 2023, Subaihi and Nasser were released by the Houthis as part of a prisoner swap with the Yemeni government.

=== Post-release ===
On 9 May 2024, al-Subaihi was promoted to the rank of Lieutenant General, and received the September 26 Medal from Presidential Leadership Council head Rashad al-Alimi for his role in confronting the Houthis. On 12 May 2024, Alimi issued a decree appointing al-Subaihi as his advisor for defense and security affairs.
