= Al-Fajaa (Mallah) =

Al-Fajaa (Arabic: الفجة) is a village in Al Milah District, Lahij Governorate, Al Milah District, Yemen.

According to the 2004 Yemeni Census, the population of the sub-district was 22 residents.

As of 2014, the population of Al-Fajaa reached 29 residents.
