= Lahij insurgency =

Insurgency of the Yemeni Civil War

Coordinates: 13.1548°N 44.8236°E

- Part of the South Yemen insurgency and Saudi Arabian-led intervention in Yemen
- Lahij Governorate
Date	27 March – 4 August 2015 (4 months, 1 week and 1 day)
Location	Lahij Governorate, Yemen
Result	Cabinet of Yemen/Coalition victory

Belligerents
(Yemen) Supreme Revolutionary Committee: Houthi fighters; Security Forces (pro-Saleh); Yemeni Republican Guard	Cabinet of Yemen: Security Forces (pro-Hadi); People's Committees; Popular resistance; Arab Coalition: Saudi Arabia (leader); Bahrain; Egypt; Jordan; Kuwait; Morocco; Sudan; United Arab Emirates Supported by: United States; United Kingdom (Note: training, intelligence, logistical support, weapons, and blockade up to 2017); France; Canada Al-Qaeda Emirate in Yemen; AQAP

Casualties and losses
470–745 killed	242–259 killed

The Lahij insurgency was a subconflict in the Yemeni civil war waged in 2015 by tribesmen loyal to Abdrabbuh Mansour Hadi against the Houthis and Yemen Army units loyal to Ali Abdullah Saleh, who controlled most of the Lahij Governorate of Yemen. In late July, pro-Hadi forces had launched an offensive to recapture Al Anad Air Base and the rest of Lahij Governorate. On 4 August, pro-Hadi forces had retaken full control of the Lahij Governorate.

== Background ==
On 24 March 2015, heavy fighting erupted in the Lahij Governorate as Houthi forces advanced.

On the morning of 25 March, the Houthis seized Al Anad Air Base, which had recently been abandoned by the American special forces. Soon after, the Houthis also captured Al Houta, where they took the Defence Minister Mahmoud al-Subaihi, one of Hadi's top lieutenants, prisoner and transferred him to Sanaa. In addition, the Houthi-allied 33rd Armored Brigade captured the towns of Al-Habilain and Al-Malah. With this, the Houthis had gained control of Lahij Province.

== The insurgency ==
On 27 March, 15–20 Houthi fighters were killed in an ambush in the Wahat region. Two days later, a landmine explosion killed another 25 Houthi fighters, while they were heading to Aden to reinforce their troops fighting for the city.

On 6 April, Saudi-led coalition air-strikes hit the Al Anad Air Base and a military camp killing 10 fighters, while on 8 April, eight Houthis were killed in an ambush by tribal fighters in the Karsh region.

On 11 April, 18 Houthi fighters were killed in an ambush while heading to Aden. Two days later, a suspected al-Qaeda in the Arabian Peninsula (AQAP) bombing left 15 pro-Houthi soldiers dead in Al Houta.

On 13 April, anti-Houthi fighters claimed to have killed 15 in an attack on a Houthi tank using machine guns and rocket-propelled grenades in Al Houta.

On 1 July, a Coalition air-strike reportedly killed 13 Houthi fighters.

On 3 August, Pro-Hadi Forces recaptured Al Anad Air Base from Houthi rebels after besieging the base for two weeks.

On 4 August, Pro-Hadi Forces recaptured the entire Lahij Province from Houthi and Pro-Saleh forces.

== Aftermath ==
In October 2016, local media reports said that at least 40 Houthi fighters were killed or injured during clashes with the government forces in hilly regions bordering Taiz in Lahij. Five loyalists were killed while fighting the assault.

== See also ==
- Outline of the Yemeni crisis, revolution, and civil war (2011–present)
- Timeline of the Yemeni crisis (2011–present)
