= Hisn Murad =

- Village
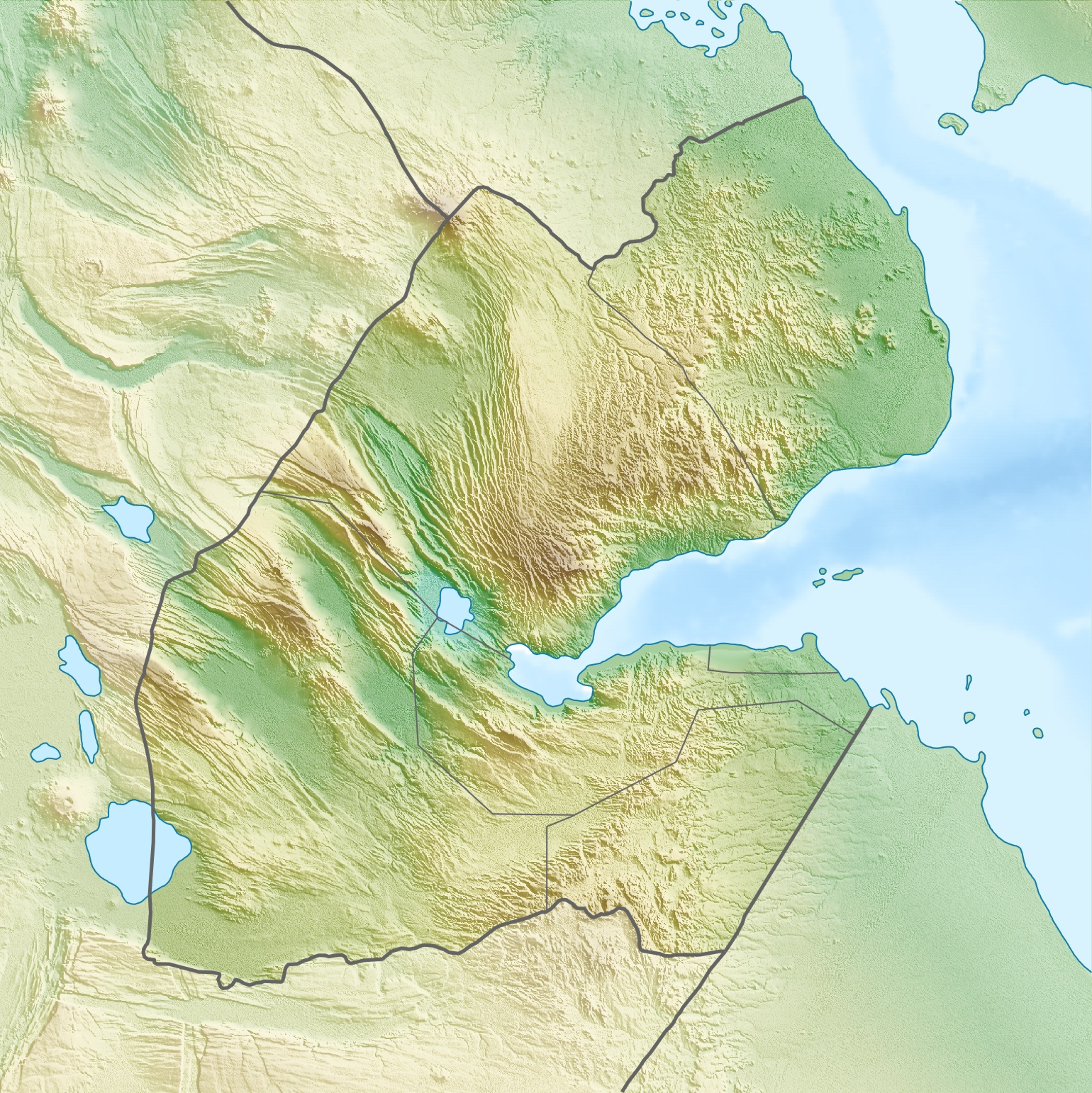
- Location in Yemen Location near Djibouti, across Bab-el-Mandeb Strait
- Coordinates: 12°40′52″N 43°30′13″E
- Country: Yemen
- Governorate: Lahij Governorate

Hisn Murad or Murad is a small coastal fishing village in the Lahij Governorate of the Bab-el-Mandeb in the south-western tip of Yemen overlooking the Gulf of Aden. It lies on the border of the Lahij Governorate and the Taiz Governorate. The island of Perim lies just off the coast. It is connected by road to Dhubab and Mokha in the north and As Suqayyan, Al Bahiyah, Am Juhar and Aden in the east.

== See also ==
- Cheikh Saïd
