= Abdul-Hafez al-Saqqaf =

Yemeni military officer

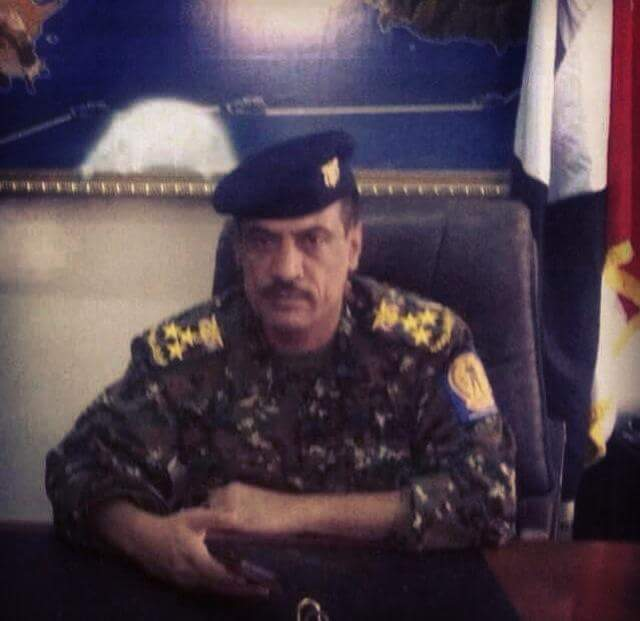
- Military career
- Allegiance: Yemen
- Branch: Yemeni Land Forces
- Rank: General
- Unit: Special Security Forces
- Conflicts: Yemeni civil war (2014–present); Battle of Aden Airport

Abdul-Hafez al-Saqqaf is a Yemeni military officer. A general in Yemen's Special Security Forces, al-Saqqaf achieved notoriety when he defied President Abd Rabbuh Mansur Hadi's decree to step down in March 2015, amid the aftermath of a coup d'état that split Yemen's government and military and saw Hadi establish a provisional seat of government in Aden.

Al-Saqqaf held the title of SSF Commander in Aden. On 3 March 2015, Hadi issued a decree nominating Thabet Muthanna Yahya Naji Jawas to the position and reassigning al-Saqqaf as undersecretary of the Vital Status and Civil Registration Authority in Aden. Al-Saqqaf and his supporters rejected the decree, even after Hadi withdrew Jawas' nomination in favour of Adlan Saleh Al-Hattas. The Yemen Times reported that al-Saqqaf did not view Hadi as the legitimate president of Yemen, and that Hadi considered al-Saqqaf to be loyal to former president Ali Abdullah Saleh and the Houthis. Al-Saqqaf accused Hadi of wanting to give al Qaeda control over Aden.

On 19 March, troops loyal to Saleh and commanded by al-Saqqaf stormed Aden International Airport, sparking a battle with police, militiamen, and soldiers loyal to Hadi and commanded by Major General Mahmoud al-Subaihi. Al-Saqqaf and his forces reportedly surrendered after government troops overran the SSF base in Aden. The following night, al-Saqqaf reportedly fled Aden in a convoy toward Sana'a when gunmen attempted to assassinate him on a road in the Lahij Governorate. According to Agence France-Presse, four were killed in the ambush, including one of al-Saqqaf's bodyguards, but the general survived.
