= As Suqayyan =

- Village
- Location in Yemen
- Coordinates: 12°45′7″N 43°35′48″E
- Country: Yemen
- Governorate: Lahij Governorate

As Suqayyan is a small coastal village in the Lahij Governorate of south-western Yemen. It is located 12.4 km northeast by road from Hisn Murad.
