= FlyAden =

Yemeni airline

- FlyAden Airbus A320-200
| IATA | ICAO | Call sign |
|---|---|---|
| DH | QFF | — |
- Founded: 2024
- Hubs: Aden International Airport
- Fleet size: 2
- Headquarters: Aden
- Website: fly-aden.com/en/

FlyAden is a Yemeni airline based at Aden International Airport

== History ==
FlyAden was established in 2024 by the Yemeni conglomerate Al-Qutaibi group and received its AOC in early 2025.

FlyAden began scheduled operations on 3 November 2025 from Aden to Cairo with a wetleased B737-800 of Red Sea Airlines.

The airline received its first own aircraft, an Airbus A320, in March 2026, and subsequently expanded its route network with the addition of flights to Jordan and Saudi Arabia.

== Destinations ==
As of August 2026, FlyAden flies to the following destinations:

| Country | City | Airport | Notes |
|---|---|---|---|
| Egypt | Cairo | Cairo International Airport | |
| Jordan | Amman | Queen Alia International Airport | |
| Saudi Arabia | Dammam | King Fahad International Airport | |
| Saudi Arabia | Jeddah | King Abdulaziz International Airport | |
| Yemen | Aden | Aden International Airport | Hub |

== Fleet ==
As of September 2026, FlyAden operates following aircraft:

FlyAden fleet
| Aircraft | In service | Orders | Notes |
|---|---|---|---|
| Airbus A320-200 | 2 | — | |

=== Former fleet ===
In the past, FlyAden used to operate following aircraft:

- B737-800

== See also ==
- List of airlines of Yemen
- Yemenia
