= Al Musaymir district =

Al Musaymir District
- District
- Location in Yemen
- Coordinates: 13.4289°N 44.5914°E
- Country: Yemen
- Governorate: Lahij

Population (2003)
  - Total: 26,558
- Time zone: UTC+3 (Yemen Standard Time)

Al Musaymir District (Arabic: مديرية المسيمير) is a district of the Lahij Governorate, Yemen. As of 2003, the district had a population of 26,558 inhabitants.
