= Tur Al Bahah district =

Coordinates: 13.0425°N 44.4114°E

Tur Al Bahah District طور الباحة
- District
- Interactive map of Tur Al Bahah District
- Country: Yemen
- Governorate: Lahij

Population (2003)
  - Total: 47,426
- Time zone: UTC+3 (Yemen Standard Time)

Tur Al Bahah District (Arabic: طور الباحة) is a district of the Lahij Governorate, Yemen. As of 2003, the district had a population of 47,426 inhabitants.
