= Yahr district =

Coordinates: 13°33′N 45°07′E

Yahr District
- District
- Interactive map of Yahr District
- Country: Yemen
- Governorate: Lahij

Population (2003)
  - Total: 37,148
- Time zone: UTC+3 (Yemen Standard Time)

Yahr District is a district of the Lahij Governorate, Yemen. As of 2003, the district had a population of 37,148 inhabitants.
