= 2019 Anad base drone strike =

Houthi attack in Lahij Governorate, Yemen

Anad base drone strike
- Part of Yemeni Civil War (2014–present)
- Location of Lahij Governorate in Yemen
- Location: Lahij Governorate, Yemen
- Target: Republic of Yemen Armed Forces
- Date: 10 January 2019
- Executed by: Houthis
- Casualties: 6 killed 25 injured

The Anad base drone strike was a Houthi attack carried out on 10 January 2019 in the Lahij Governorate near the southern port city of Aden. The strike killed six people attending a military parade, including the head of Yemeni Intelligence, and wounded at least 25 military personnel including a number of senior officers from the Yemeni army, the country's chief of staff, and a government official.

== Attack ==
The attack targeted a military parade at the al-Anad airbase in the Lahij Governorate in the south of the country. A sophisticated Qasef-2K model drone exploded over the parade from a height of 20 meters and rained shrapnel down on the ground. This model drone had not previously been used by the Houthis. The wounded included Maj. Gen. Mohammad Saleh Tamah, the head of Yemen's Intelligence Service, Mohammad Jawas, a senior military commander, and Ahmed al-Turki, the governor of Lahij. General Tamah died of his injuries on January 13.

== Reaction ==
The Houthis’ Al-Masirah TV announced that the aims of al-Anad base drone strike were to attack “the leadership of the invaders”.

The Houthi drone attack led to pressure on the UN to suspend peace talks in Yemen.

"This is an unprecedented and pretty aggressive move for them to be hitting this base," Adam Baron, visiting fellow with the European Council on Human Relations, told ABC News. "The Houthis have not succeeded in carrying out an attack of this magnitude against a Yemeni military installation in quite some time."

Jeremy Binnie, a weapons expert who works as the Middle East and Africa editor at Jane's Defence Weekly, said he believes it's the first time the Houthis used this version of the drone in the field.
