= Hussein Khairan =

Yemeni military officer (born 1953)

Major general Hussein Khairan
- حسين خيران

Minister of Defense (Supreme Political Council)
- Disputed (Note: Tenure as Minister of Defense disputed by Mahmoud al-Subaihi)
- In office 22 March 2015 – 28 November 2016 (Note: Acting: 22 March 2015 – 4 October 2016)
- President: Muhammad al-Houthi; Saleh Ali al-Sammad
- Prime Minister: Talal Aklan; Abdel-Aziz bin Habtour
- Preceded by: Mahmoud al-Subaihi
- Succeeded by: Muhammad al-Atifi

Chief of the General Staff of the Yemeni Armed Forces
- In office 7 December 2014 – 5 April 2015
- President: Abdrabbuh Mansour Hadi
- Preceded by: Ahmed Ali al-Ashwal
- Succeeded by: Mohammed Ali al-Maqdashi

Personal details
- Born: 1953 (age 72–73) Zindan, Arhab district, Sanaa Governorate, North Yemen

Military service
- Allegiance: North Yemen (1971–1990); Yemen (1990–2015); (Houthis) Houthi-controlled Yemen (2015–present)
- Branch/service: Yemeni Land Forces
- Years of service: 1971–present
- Rank: Major general
- Commands: 1st Marine Infantry Division (1993–2014)
- Battles/wars: Yemeni civil war (2014–present)

Hussein Naji Hadi Khairan (Note: Arabic: حسين ناجي هادي خيران, romanized: Ḥusayn Nājī Hādī Khayrān) is a Yemeni military officer who is the Presidential Advisor on Defense and Security Affairs of the Houthi-backed Supreme Political Council as of November 2016. A veteran military officer, Khairan was appointed Chief of the General Staff of the Yemeni Armed Forces in December 2014 under President Abdrabbuh Mansour Hadi. He defected to the Houthis in March 2015 and was appointed their acting Minister of Defense, later officially claiming the role in October 2016 before being replaced by Muhammad al-Atifi the next month. In this role, Khairan oversaw Houthi-aligned forces as they conducted an offensive against government holdouts in southern Yemen during the early stages of the Yemeni civil war.

== Biography ==
=== Early life and education ===
Khairan was born in 1953 in Zindan, a subdistrict of Arhab district in Sanaa Governorate, North Yemen. He completed secondary education at the al-Wahda School in Sanaa in 1967 before pursuing military education. He received a bachelor's degree in military science from the Sanaa Military College in 1971 and a master's degree in military science from the Command and Staff College in 1996. He took part in educational courses in Yemen as well as in Jordan and Egypt.

=== Military career ===
Khairan's military career dates to the early 1970s. He first served as an investigation officer in the Criminal Investigation Department of the military in 1972. By 1973, he was among the staff of the Military Police School, deputy commander of the Military Police Companies, and head of the military police branch in al-Hudaydah and Hajjah. From 1975 to 1976, he served as the director of Military Police Investigations, commander of Military Police Companies, and commander of Military Reconnaissance in the Taiz Brigade.

From thereon, he was appointed deputy commander of companies in the General Command of the Armed Forces and commander of the Central Military Region in 1978, served as commander of the Presidential Guard until 1980, deputy director general of anti-smuggling from 1980 to 1981, and commander of the Military Police and Intelligence in the Taiz Brigade from 1982 to 1989. After the unification of Yemen in 1990, he served as commander of the Military Police and Intelligence in the al-Hudaydah Brigade until 1993.

He was the commander of the 1st Marine Infantry Brigade based in Socotra from 1993 to 2014. On 1 March 2012, days after President Ali Abdullah Saleh transferred power to Abdrabbuh Mansour Hadi in the aftermath of the Yemeni revolution, soldiers from numerous military divisions including nearly 500 from the 1st Marine Infantry Brigade protested in Sanaa demanding the ouster of their leaders, including Khairan who they accused of corruption.

=== Yemeni civil war ===
In a presidential decree issued on 7 December 2014, Khairan was appointed Chief of the General Staff of the Yemeni Armed Forces, replacing Ahmed Ali al-Ashwal. In the context of the Houthi takeover of Sanaa months prior, researcher Ali al-Dhahab believed Khairan was selected due to lack of affiliation with former president Saleh or General Ali Mohsen al-Ahmar, and noted the influence of his tribe in Arhab, an area which surrounds much of the capital. Military analyst Saleh al-Asbahi said the appointment of Khairan was not influenced by the Houthis or other political actors but was rather based on his "competence and experience". On 16 December, Houthi forces blocked Khairan from entering his office in Sanaa as they objected to his selection as chief of staff.

Houthi politburo member Mohammed al-Bukhaiti announced on 22 March that Khairan had defected and was appointed their acting Minister of Defense, commanding military units aligned with the Houthis. Bukhaiti "gave no reason for the selection of Khairan other than the need to fill a position left vacant" after the Minister of Defense under the Hadi administration, Mahmoud al-Subaihi fled from Sanaa to regroup with government-aligned forces in Aden. Khairan was involved in leading the Houthi offensive in the south. Hadi officially dismissed him as chief of staff on 5 April, although it did not affect his position in the Houthi government.

Khairan retained the position of Minister of Defense in the Houthi-backed Supreme Revolutionary Committee as well as the Supreme Political Council (SPC) under prime minister Abdel-Aziz bin Habtour, whose cabinet was formed on 4 October 2016. He was initially listed as among the officials killed in an airstrike on a funeral hall by the Saudi-led coalition, but Saba News Agency reported that he took part in a meeting with SPC president Saleh al-Sammad on 23 October. Khairan was appointed the Presidential Advisor on Defense and Security Affairs for the SPC on 29 November.
