= Habil Jabr district =

Coordinates: 13°28′N 45°07′E

Habil Jabr District
- District
- Interactive map of Habil Jabr District
- Country: Yemen
- Governorate: Lahij

Population (2003)
  - Total: 41,474
- Time zone: UTC+3 (Yemen Standard Time)

Habil Jabr District is a district of the Lahij Governorate, Yemen. As of 2003, the district had a population of 41,474 inhabitants.
