= Qawah =

- Location in Yemen
- Coordinates: 12°40′19″N 44°25′0″E
- Country: Yemen
- Governorate: Lahij Governorate
- Time zone: UTC+3 (Yemen Standard Time)

Qawah is a small fishing village in Lahij Governorate on the south coast of Yemen, about 60 kilometres west of Aden, and one of the southernmost points of the Arabia. It is surrounded by desert.

On January 12, 2011, the offshore vessel Bourbon Hestia was attacked by Somali pirates near Qawah.
