= Al Maflahy district =

Al Maflahy District
- District
- Location in Yemen
- Coordinates: 13°33′N 45°05′E
- Country: Yemen
- Governorate: Lahij

Population (2003)
  - Total: 38,524
- Time zone: UTC+3 (Yemen Standard Time)

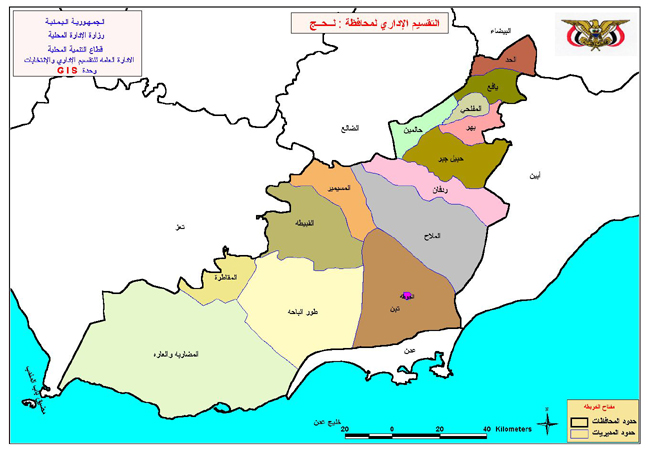

Al Maflahy District (Arabic: مديرية المفلحي) is a district of the Lahij Governorate, in southwestern Yemen. As of 2003, the district had a population of 38,524 inhabitants.
