= Al Had district =

- District
- Location in Yemen
- Coordinates: 13°58′N 45°18′E
- Country: Yemen
- Governorate: Lahij

Population (2003)
  - Total: 53,159
- Time zone: UTC+3 (Yemen Standard Time)

Al Had district is a district of the Lahij Governorate, Yemen. As of 2003, the district had a population of 53,159 inhabitants.
