= Al Qabbaytah district =

Coordinates: 13°15′N 44°30′E

Al Qabbaytah District
- District
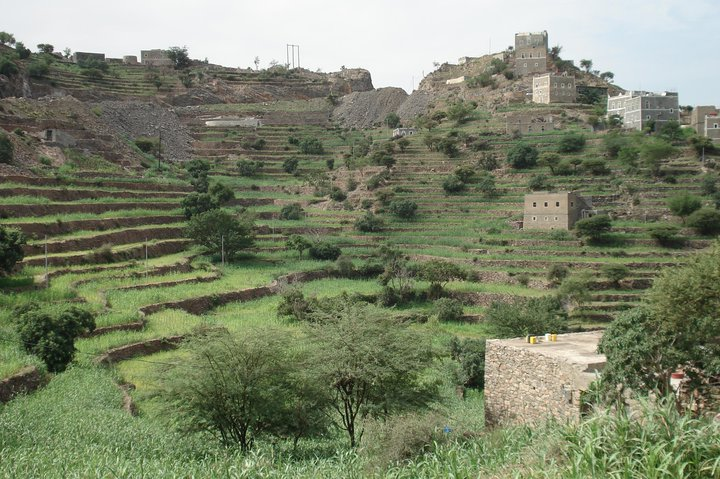
- Interactive map of Al Qabbaytah District
- Country: Yemen
- Governorate: Lahij

Population (2003)
  - Total: 94,516
- Time zone: UTC+3 (Yemen Standard Time)

Al Qabbaytah District is a district of the Lahij Governorate, Yemen. As of 2003, the district had a population of 94,516 inhabitants.
