= Ahmed Ali al-Ashwal =

Retired Yemeni general (born 1949)

Major general Ahmed Ali al-Ashwal
- أحمد علي الأشول
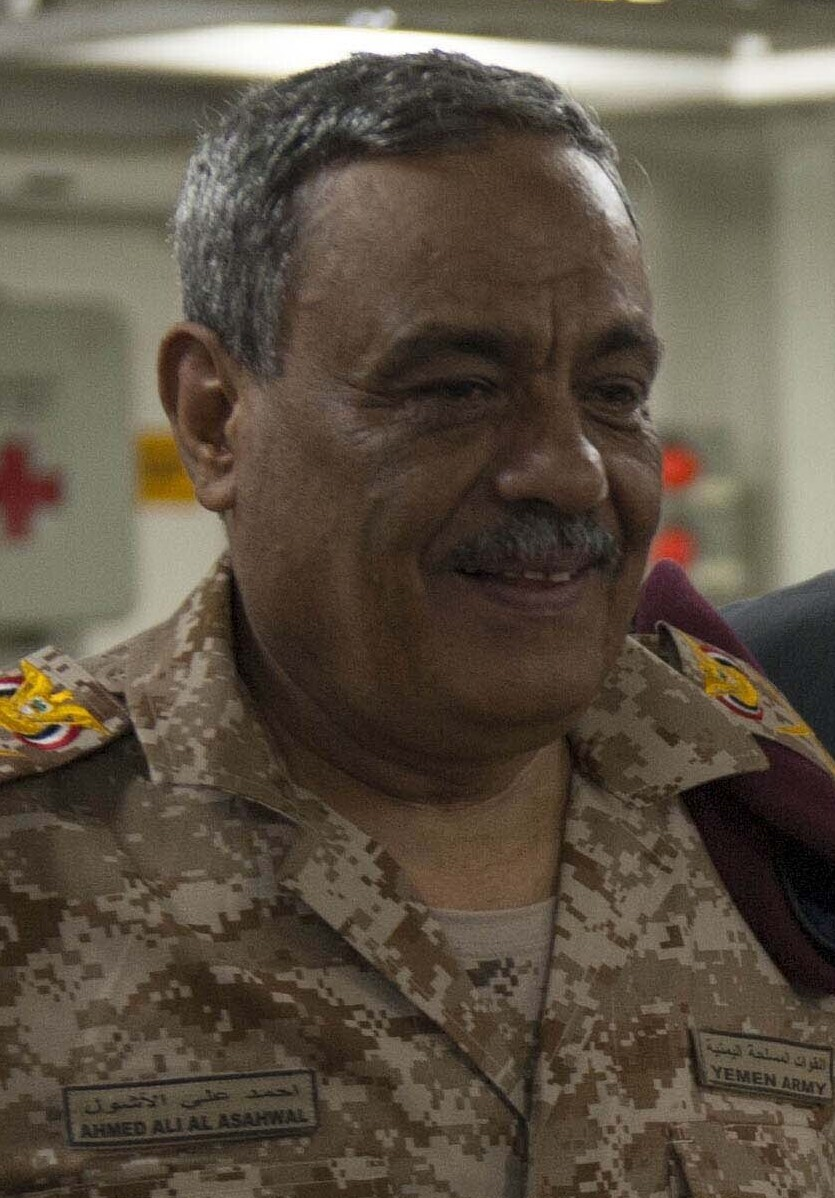
- Ashwal in 2013

Member of the Shura Council
- Incumbent
- Assumed office 8 December 2014

Chief of the General Staff of the Yemeni Armed Forces
- In office 23 April 2006 – 8 December 2014
- President: Ali Abdullah Saleh Abdrabbuh Mansur Hadi
- Prime Minister: Abdul Qadir Bajamal; Ali Muhammad Mujawar; Mohammed Basindawa; Abdullah Mohsen al-Akwa; Khaled Bahah
- Preceded by: Mohammed Ali al-Qasimi
- Succeeded by: Hussein Khairan

Personal details
- Born: 1949 (age 76–77) Ibb Governorate, Yemen Arab Republic

Military service
- Allegiance: Yemen
- Branch/service: Yemeni Land Forces
- Years of service: 1963–2014
- Rank: Major general
- Commands: 2nd Storm Brigade; Air and Air Defense College; Military College
- Battles/wars: Yemeni civil war (1994); Houthi insurgency; Al-Qaeda insurgency in Yemen; Yemeni civil war (2014–present)

Ahmed Ali al-Ashwal (Arabic: أحمد علي الأشول; born 1949) is a retired major general of the Yemeni Armed Forces. He served as the military's Chief of the General Staff from 2006 to 2014, during which he oversaw conflicts against the Houthis as well as al-Qaeda in the Arabian Peninsula. He was a key ally for the United States during and after the Yemeni revolution, working with President Abdrabbuh Mansour Hadi to reform the military and security forces after the ouster of Ali Abdullah Saleh. Ashwal was dismissed as chief of staff in December 2014 and given a position in the Shura Council, months after the Houthis had invaded the capital of Sanaa. He announced his retirement from the military soon after.

== Biography ==
Ashwal was born in Ibb Governorate in 1949. He joined the Yemeni military in 1963, studying in Russia and receiving training in Jordan. A specialist in artillery, he occupied several positions within the military, such as commander of artillery units at the southern airport from 1967 to 1986, chief of staff of the 2nd Storm Brigade from 1972 to 1974 and commander of the 2nd Storm Brigade from 1974 to 1977. He was then assigned as the director of Yemen's Air and Air Defense College from 1980 to 1994, and eventually the director of the Military College from 1994 to 2006.

=== Chief of the General Staff (2006–2014) ===
Ashwal was appointed Chief of the General Staff of the Yemeni Armed Forces on 23 April 2006 through a decree from President Ali Abdullah Saleh. The directive also had him promoted to the rank of major general. He said in 2013 that the military was beset by corruption and political conflict since the late 20th century, which has hindered its integrity. According to him, these issues were brought to a head by the Yemeni revolution. During a January 2012 protest involving hundreds of Yemeni Air Force personnel demanding the dismissal of their commander, Saleh loyalist General Mohammed Saleh al-Ahmar, Ashwal went to the scene to ensure that the demonstrators would not be fired upon by security forces. Ashwal was involved in negotiations with the protesting air force officers regarding Ahmar's relief among other demands.

Through the revolution, Ashwal emerged as an important ally in Yemen for the United States. In June 2011, he and Vice President Abdrabbuh Mansour Hadi met American ambassador Gerald M. Feierstein to discuss plans for a peaceful transition of power from Saleh, who had recently left Yemen after having been injured in a bombing. Between late 2011 and early 2012, Ashwal visited Washington D.C. twice in talks centering on the security relationship between the two countries under a new transitional government led by Hadi, who replaced Saleh as President in February 2012. Ashwal supported Hadi's plans for reorganizing the military into a more professional fighting force, and endorsed demands for reform in the Ministry of Defense. Amidst the restructuring process, Ashwal received backing from US officials, with homeland security advisor John O. Brennan calling him "an impressive and professional military officer." He later praised Ashwal among other Hadi administration figures for their dedication towards fighting al-Qaeda in the Arabian Peninsula (AQAP).

Ashwal was among the security officials targeted in an AQAP suicide bombing at the National Unity Day parade rehearsal in Sanaa on 21 May. Nearly 100 soldiers were killed in the attack, though he nor any other official was harmed. He the sole official to speak at the parade which commenced the next day as planned. He said in a speech: "The barbaric attack on Sabin Square will not scare us and will not prevent us from going ahead with our war on these evil elements. Our war on them will not stop until we free our land." He led an investigative committee formed in response to an AQAP attack on the Ministry of Defense complex on 5 December 2013.

On 6 June 2014, as the Yemeni government began signalling an expansion to a military offensive against AQAP strongholds from Abyan and Shabwah to al-Bayda Governorate, Ashwal toured the base of 139th Infantry Brigade in the town of Radda. During the tour, he stated "the war against al-Qaeda is open and does not have borders of a specific region," telling the brigade to prepare to fight AQAP.

In Presidential Decree No. 72, issued on 7 December 2014, Ashwal was removed from his position as chief of staff and bestowed a seat in the consultative Shura Council. President Hadi issued another decree the same day announcing the selection of General Hussein Khairan to succeed him. Although no official reason was given for Ashwal's dismissal, it was likely to have been influenced by the chaotic situation in Yemen since September, when the Houthis took control of Sanaa. The dismissal order was also given hours after the Houthi-affiliated al-Masirah channel broadcast an alleged statement from Ashwal in which he praised the group for combating terrorism.

=== Retirement ===
Soon after the order, Ashwal announced his retirement from the military. In July 2015, Ashwal issued a statement denying news reports of his home in Beit al-Ashwal, Ibb, being struck by a Saudi-led coalition airstrike. He called the reports an attempt to bring him back into the political spotlight, adding that he would always be dedicated serving Yemen and had no partisan bias.
