= Al Makhzan Al Fawqi =

Coordinates: 13°11′N 45°19′E

Al makhzan al fawqi
- Interactive map of Al makhzan al fawqi
- Country: Yemen
- Governorate: Abyan
- Time zone: UTC+3 (Yemen Standard Time)

Al makhzan al fawqi is a village in south-western Yemen. It is located in the Abyan Governorate.
