= Battle of Aden Airport =

Conflict between Saleh and Hadi loyalists

Coordinates: 12.7736°N 45.0264°E

- Part of the Yemeni Civil War (2014–present)
| Date | 19 March 2015 |
| Location | Aden, Yemen |
| Result | Yemeni government victory |

Belligerents
| Hadi-led government; Yemen Army; Police; People's Committees; Popular resistance | (Yemen) Saleh loyalists: Special Security Forces |

Commanders and leaders
| (Yemen) Abdrabbuh Hadi (Yemen) Mahmoud al-Subaihi | (Yemen) Abdul-Hafez al-Saqqaf (Yemen) Ali Abdullah Saleh |

Casualties and losses
- 13 killed, 63 wounded

The Battle of Aden International Airport broke out in the early morning hours of 19 March 2015, when Yemen Army units loyal to former president Ali Abdullah Saleh attacked the airport in Aden, Yemen. The airport was defended by soldiers and guards supporting Abdrabbuh Mansur Hadi, Yemen's internationally recognised president.

== Background ==
Ali Abdullah Saleh, who was ousted from power by the 2011 Yemeni Revolution, was widely suspected in 2014 of allying with the Houthis in their successful insurgency against the government of his former vice president and successor as president, Abdrabbuh Mansur Hadi. After the Houthi takeover of Sanaa and a monthlong detention by militants, Hadi escaped to Aden in February 2015, followed some weeks later by his defence minister, Major General Mahmoud al-Subaihi. Saleh stated the week before his forces assaulted Aden International Airport that he would drive Hadi into the Red Sea.

In Aden, where Hadi was working to establish a rival government with international backing, clashes erupted earlier in March when he tried to dismiss Brigadier General Abdul-Hafez al-Saqqaf, a Saleh loyalist with command over two army units and special security forces.

== Developments ==
=== Attack on the airport ===
Al-Saqqaf's special security forces stormed the airport early in the morning of 19 March, claiming they were fired upon from surrounding buildings. Army and militia units loyal to Hadi responded, eventually repulsing the assault. Some 100 passengers on a Yemenia flight to Cairo were evacuated from their plane on the airport tarmac due to the fighting. At least two shells exploded at the airport, killing at least four and injuring more than a dozen. Three soldiers loyal to Saleh were reported dead in the attack and 10 more were captured. A Boeing 747 passenger jet used as one of Hadi's presidential aircraft was damaged by gunfire. The fighting lasted about four hours and was eventually joined by al-Subaihi and his forces, who evacuated the airport terminal under heavy fire.

=== Base assault ===
After the defence of the airport, al-Subaihi's troops attacked the adjacent al-Sawlaban special police base in the Khormaksar district. After hitting it with artillery, Hadi-loyal soldiers and militiamen overran the base in the afternoon and looted it. Al-Saqqaf reportedly surrendered, turning himself in to the governor of the Lahj Governorate. "Many" special forces troops were captured, according to Reuters eyewitnesses.

Although army, police, and militia units loyal to Hadi deployed on Aden's streets and at key locations throughout the city, pro-Saleh forces were successful in taking control of the local city council building, according to the Associated Press.

== Aftermath ==
=== Airstrike against Hadi's compound ===
In apparent retaliation for the fall of the al-Sawlaban base, at least one warplane reportedly controlled by the Houthis attacked Hadi's presidential palace later on 19 March in the al-Maasheeq district of Aden, firing missiles. Anti-aircraft guns responded, and smoke was seen rising from the compound. A second pass by the aircraft was thwarted by anti-aircraft fire. Hadi was reportedly in a different location at the time of the attack, and no damage was reported, according to a presidential aide.

In at least two more instances as of 21 March, unidentified aircraft flew near the presidential palace and were forced off by anti-aircraft fire, Reuters reported.

=== Assassination attempt on al-Saqqaf ===
A convoy from Aden to Lahij including General al-Saqqaf came under fire in Al-Athawir overnight after the battle. Al-Saqqaf was uninjured, but a bodyguard was shot dead and three others were killed when their vehicle overturned, according to a Lahij security official.

=== Civil war breaks out ===
Two days after the battle at the airport, the Houthi Revolutionary Committee declared a "state of general mobilisation" against "terrorist elements" in southern Yemen. The declaration heralded the start of a military offensive by Houthi fighters and pro-Saleh army units against forces of then-president Hadi and a coalition led by Saudi Arabia. The airport was reportedly seized by Saleh loyalists on 25 March, only to be retaken on 29 March after the start of a bombing campaign led by Saudi Arabia.

== Responses ==
The Houthi Supreme Security Committee in Sana'a issued a statement calling for an end to the clashes, saying both sides "are obliged to keep the peace and return to the negotiating table". Hadi condemned the attack on the airport as an "attempted coup" by al-Saqqaf. The editor-in-chief of the Yemen Post told Al Jazeera that the pro-Saleh troops who attacked the airport were still in Aden after the battle and could be expected to continue their attacks on Hadi.
