= Al Madaribah Wa Al Arah district =

Al Madaribah Wa Al Arah District مديرية المضاربة والعارة
- District
- Location in Yemen
- Coordinates: 12°50′N 44°00′E
- Country: Yemen
- Governorate: Lahij

Area
  - Total: 1,848.50 km^{2} (713.71 sq mi)

Population (2004-12-16)
  - Total: 45,808
- Time zone: UTC+3 (Yemen Standard Time)

Al Madaribah Wa Al Arah District (Arabic: مديرية المضاربة والعارة) is the westernmost and southernmost of the 15 districts of the Lahij Governorate, Yemen. With an area of 1848.50 km^{2}, it is also the largest of all districts within the governorate. As of the census of population on 2004-12-16, the district had a population of 45,808 inhabitants.
