= Khor Maksar =

Coordinates: 12.810°N 45.037°E

Khor Maksar خور مكسر
- District
- Khormaksar District
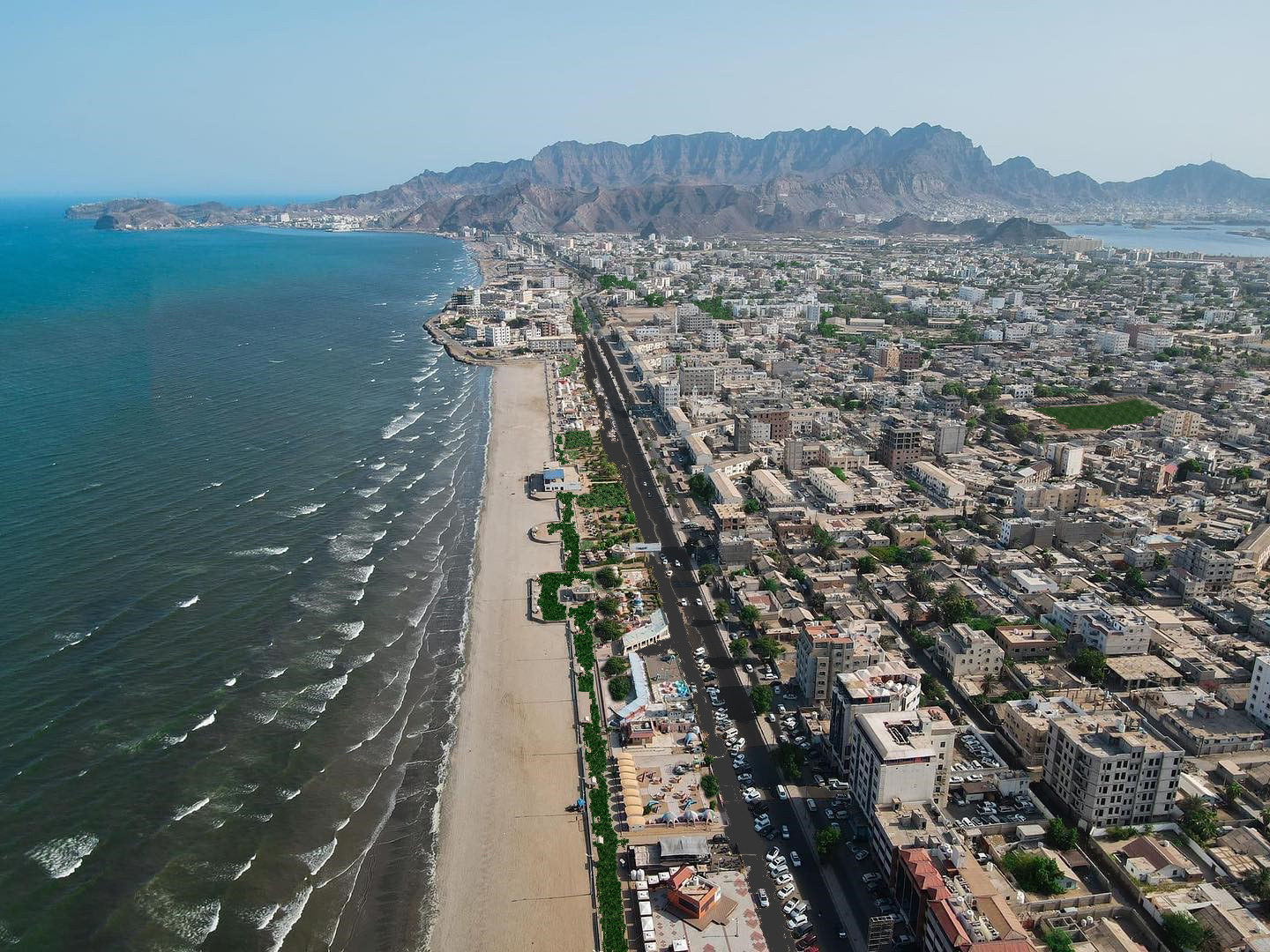
- Aerial view of the Abyan Beach in Khor Maksar
- Interactive map of Khor Maksar
- Country: Yemen
- Governorate: Aden

Population (2003)
  - Total: 47,044
- Time zone: UTC+3 (Yemen Standard Time)

Khor Maksar (/ˌkɔːrˈmæksɑːr/; Arabic: خور مكسر, Taʽizzi-Adeni: [χɔːrˈmæksɑr]) is a district of the Aden Governorate, Yemen. As of 2003, the district had a population of 47,044 inhabitants.

== History ==
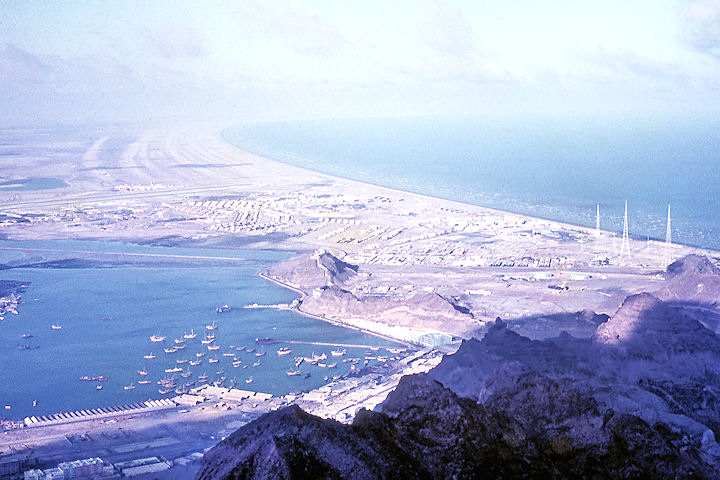
A view of Khor Maksar from Jabal Shamsan, 1960

As part of Aden Colony, Khor Maksar was a military base for the British forces who built multiple barracks in the area. Its importance strengthened further after the Royal Air Force moved to the district in 1927. They constructed airports and some military camps to accommodate the Air Force soldiers.

After World War II, Khor Maksar was planned and built according to the modern English style with all the necessary facilities. Furthermore, the Military Airport was renovated and a new airport was constructed, which is known today as Aden International Airport. This was followed by the construction of several wooden houses, some of which consisted of two floors, and some other one-story English-style houses and the construction Elizabeth II Hospital, which was a hospital in Aden.

At the end of the 1950s, al-Shabat (from English "the shops") area was constructed in the district. It consisted of several large apartment buildings, new streets were paved, and all supporting facilities such as schools, public colleges, public parks, casinos and discothèques, cinemas, and hotels were built. They were all built to serve the soldiers in the British Military Base of East Suez. Therefore, Khor Maksar district became one of the best neighborhoods of modern-style homes for the British soldiers and British officers. Public services like water, electricity, telecommunications, and sewage were completed and renewed at the beginning of the 1960s, and the number of military camps in Khor Maksar was expanded to seven fully equipped camps.
