= Zindan (Sanaa) =

Zindan زندان
- Sub-district
- Location in Yemen
- Coordinates: 15.71555°N 44.25168°E
- Country: Yemen
- Governorate: Sana'a
- District: Arhab

Population (2004)
  - Total: 8,060
- Time zone: UTC+3

Zindan (Arabic: زندان) is a sub-district located in Arhab District, Sana'a Governorate, Yemen. Zindan had a population of 8060 according to the 2004 census.
