= Al Milah district =

Al Milah District
- District
- Location in Yemen
- Coordinates: 13°10′N 45°05′E
- Country: Yemen
- Governorate: Lahij

Population (2003)
  - Total: 27,636
- Time zone: UTC+3 (Yemen Standard Time)

Al Milah District is a district of the Lahij Governorate, Yemen. As of 2003, the district had a population of 27,636 inhabitants.

== Villages ==
- Al-Fajaa
