= Al-Anad Air Base =

Airbase located in Lahij Governorate, Yemen

Al Anad Air Base
- قاعدة العند الجوية
- Lahij Governorate in Yemen

Site information
- Type: Air Base
- Owner: Ministry of Defense (Yemen)
- Operator: Yemeni Air Force

Location
- Shown within Yemen
- Coordinates: 13°10′34″N 44°45′44″E

Site history
- Built: 1976
- In use: 1976 - present

Airfield information
- Elevation: 274 metres (899 ft) AMSL
Runways
Direction	Length and surface
07/25	2,880 metres (9,449 ft) Asphalt

Al Anad Air Base is a Yemeni military air base located in Tuban district of the Lahij Governorate. It is the biggest air base in Yemen.

== History ==
The base was built by the Soviet Union for South Yemen during the Cold War.

The base witnessed fierce battles during the 1994 Yemeni Civil War as it was one of the key entry points to Aden.

The base served as a headquarters for United States intelligence-gathering and counterterrorism operations in southern Yemen until the aftermath of the Houthi takeover in Yemen when the Houthis launched a military offensive against the remnants of the Western-backed administration in Aden. In March 2015, the U.S. evacuated its remaining special forces from the base when Al-Qaeda in the Arabian Peninsula (AQAP) briefly took over the governornate. Days later, on 25 March, the installation was taken over by Houthi fighters and the 201st Armoured Brigade of the Yemen Army. The following day, forces loyal to President Abd Rabbuh Mansur Hadi shelled the base, causing at least some Houthis to flee.

Loyalist fighters backed by Saudi and UAE ground forces retook the installation on 3 August 2015, with its rebel defenders fleeing to the nearby hills. The recapture came two weeks after the government's victory in the Battle of Aden.

On 31 January 2016 it was reported that a Tochka tactical ballistic missile fired by Houthi rebels struck the base killing dozens of Sudanese fighters and Yemeni recruits.

A Houthi drone penetrated the air base on January 10, 2019, and exploded above a podium where senior army officials were sitting. The head of the Yemen Intelligence Agency and six soldiers were killed and some senior officials were injured.

A major attack occurred on 29 August 2021, when Houthi militants attacked the base with drones and ballistic missiles, killing 30 soldiers and wounding 60 more. Later the death toll increased to more than 40 killed.
