= Aden International Airport =

Airport in Yemen

Aden International Airport مطار عدن الدولي
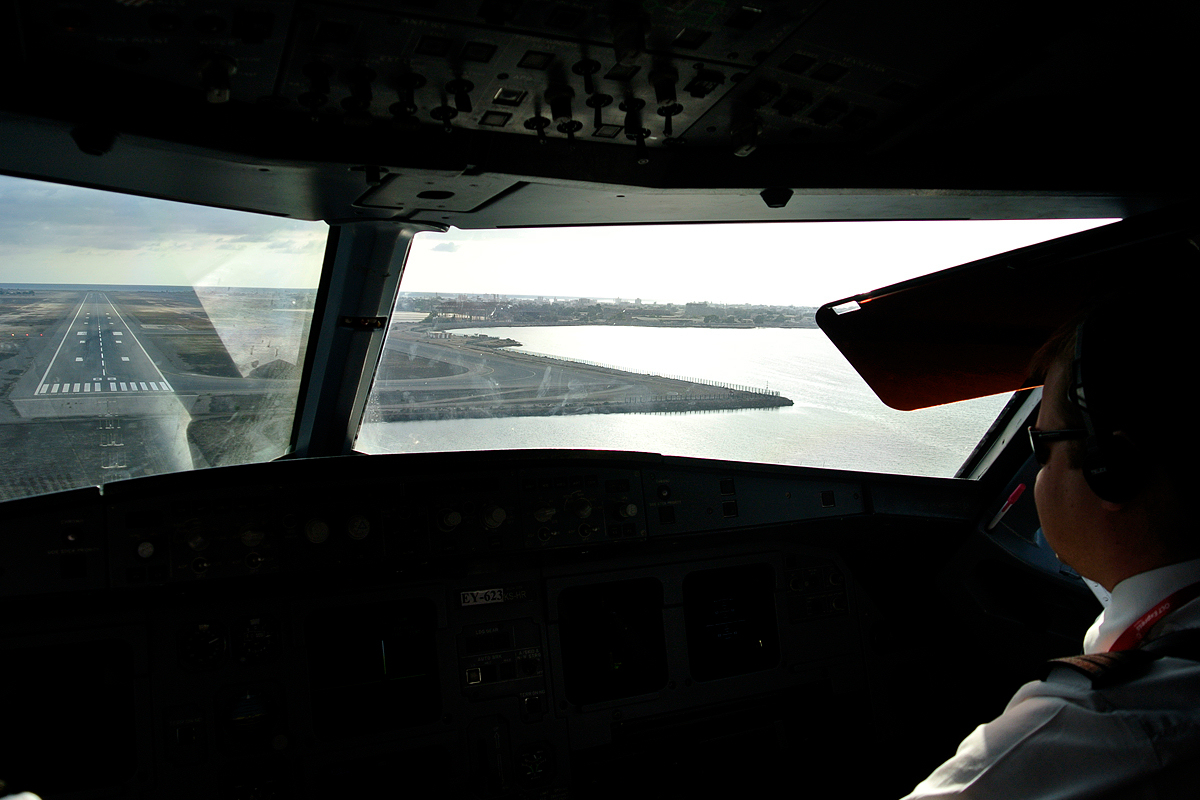
- Plane on finals to Aden International Airport
- IATA: ADE; ICAO: OYAA

Summary
- Airport type: Public / military
- Operator: Government of Yemen
- Serves: Aden
- Location: Aden, Yemen
- Hub for: Yemenia Airways
- Elevation AMSL: 7 ft (2.1 m)
- Coordinates: 12°49′46″N 045°01′44″E

Map
- Location within Yemen

Runways
Direction	Length		Surface
Direction	ft	m	Surface
08/26	10,171	3,100	Asphalt
- Source: World Aero Data

Aden International Airport (IATA: ADE, ICAO: OYAA) is an international airport in Aden, Yemen and the oldest airport in the Arabian Peninsula. Prior to its use as a civil air facility, the aerodrome was known as RAF Khormaksar, which opened in 1917 and closed as an RAF station in 1967. In the 1970s and 1980s it was both a civilian airport and a Soviet Naval Aviation base. It continues to be used for military purposes by the Yemeni Air Force.

== History ==
The airport was established on the former RAF Khormaksar, which opened in 1917 during Aden Province era and closed as an RAF station in 1967 following the Aden Emergency and independence of South Yemen. It later served as a Soviet Naval Aviation station during the 1970s and 1980s, being visited by aircraft of the 77th independent Long-Range Anti-Submarine Aviation Regiment (Soviet Pacific Fleet) and the 145th independent Long-Range Anti-Submarine Aviation Squadron (Baltic Fleet), flying Ilyushin Il-38s (ASCC "May"). From 1971 until 1996 it was also the main hub of Alyemda Yemen Democratic Airlines. It is the second-largest airport in Yemen after Sanaa International Airport. The new terminal was built between 1983 and 1985, with a capacity of one million passengers a year. A major reconstruction and expansion of Aden International was completed in 2001, including a new runway that can handle large, long-haul aircraft. In 2000 the constructions at the new control tower and airport department building were completed. Plans to make that airport a regional cargo hub, with an "air cargo village" by 2004 appear to have failed. Although construction began in January 2003, by the end of the year the managing company had dissolved.

During the Yemeni civil war in the aftermath of the Houthi takeover in Yemen, the city of Aden including its airport became a battleground. The Battle of Aden Airport took place on 19 March 2015, with Houthi forces mounting an attack on the airport that was repelled by forces loyal to President Abdrabbuh Mansur Hadi. Operations were suspended for months, owing to bombing by the Saudi Air Force in Operation Decisive Storm.

On 22 July 2015, the airport was declared fit for operation again, as a Saudi plane carrying aid reportedly became the first plane to land in Aden in four months. Two days later two more Saudi planes landed carrying the equipment needed to resume operations, to enable aid to be delivered to the embattled country.

On 26 November 2015, the airport re-opened briefly for civilian air traffic after having been closed for 10 months, with a Yemenia flight arriving from Amman-Queen Alia international Airport in Jordan. Service for the next three months was sporadic, but at the end of February 2016 it was reported that the airport would reopen for ordinary commercial service after a few weeks of repairs.

The blockade was reinstated on 21 February 2016 and lifted on 14 November 2017, when the first commercial flight landed at Aden International Airport. Flights were cancelled once again, for four days (28-31 January 2018), but resumed on 1 February 2018.

On 7 January 2026, Yemeni government forces secured full control over the airport after capturing the city from the separatist Southern Transitional Council.

== Military usage ==
The airport is also a Yemeni Air Force base. The base is home to the 128 Squadron Detachment. Aircraft attached to the squadron are mainly transport and attack helicopters (Ka27/28, Mi-8, Mi-14, Mi-17, Mi-24, Mi-171Sh).

== Airlines and destinations ==
Airlines	Destinations
African Express Airways	Mogadishu
Air Djibouti	Djibouti
FlyAden	Amman–Queen Alia, Cairo, Dammam
Yemenia	Addis Ababa, Al Ghaydah, Amman–Queen Alia, Cairo, Djibouti, Dubai–Al Maktoum, Jeddah, Kuwait City, Mukalla, Mumbai, Riyadh, Seiyun, Socotra

== Accidents and incidents ==
- On 10 April 1969, an Ethiopian Airlines Douglas C-47A landed at Aden after being hijacked by men of the Eritrean Liberation Front. One hijacker was shot by an air marshal before being arrested by Yemen police.
- On 22 February 1972, hijacked Lufthansa Flight 649, a Boeing 747-200, was diverted to the airport. Once a ransom of $5 million was paid, all 187 hostages were released on the following day.
- On 19 March 1972, EgyptAir Flight 763 crashed while on approach to Aden International. All 30 passengers and crew on board were killed.
- On 16 October 1977, the hijacked Lufthansa Flight 181 performed a fuel stop on its way to Mogadishu despite an attempt to prevent it landing by airport personnel. The captain of the flight was murdered by the lead hijacker in Aden.
- On 1 March 1977, Douglas C-47A 7O-ABF of Alyemda crashed into the Red Sea shortly after take-off. The aircraft was on a scheduled passenger flight. All 19 people on board were killed.
- On 1 April 1992, Ethiopian Airlines Flight 637 was hijacked and landed at Aden International. The hijacker, an Ethiopian seeking asylum, released the passengers.
- On 19 March 2015, more than 100 people were evacuated from a Yemenia aircraft that had been scheduled to fly to Cairo, when a battle over the airport broke out between rival elements of the Yemen Army, forcing a temporary closure. A Boeing 747 used as a presidential aircraft was also damaged by gunfire during the fighting.
- On 30 December 2020, a plane carrying members of the newly formed Yemeni government, landed at the Aden International Airport from Saudi Arabia. During the plane's landing, bombs exploded at the airport and gunmen then opened fire. 25 people were killed and 110 others were wounded to date. Prime Minister Maeen Abdulmalik Saeed, the Saudi ambassador and the rest of the government's members, who were on the plane, were taken to safety. The Houthis were blamed for the attack, but the group denied responsibility.
- On 30 October 2021, 12 civilians were killed in a bomb blast near the airport.
- On 25 July 2023, a severe thunderstorm blew through the glass facade of the airport's terminal, wounding 11 passengers, damaging two planes and forcing airlines to cancel two flights.

== See also ==
- List of airports in Yemen
