= Lahej Governorate =

Governorate of Yemen

Coordinates: 13°03′N 44°53′E

Lahej لحج
- Governorate
- Country: Yemen
- Seat: Lahej

Government
  - Governor: Ahmed Abdallah al-Turki

Area
  - Total: 12,648 km^{2} (4,883 sq mi)

Population (2025 est.)
  - Total: 1,169,594
  - Density: 92.473/km^{2} (239.50/sq mi)

Lahej (Arabic: لحج Laḥǧ) is one of the governorates of Yemen. Located in the southwestern part of the country, it is approximately 337 km (209 mi) from the national capital Sana'a. It covers an area of approximately 12,648 km^{2} (4,883 sq mi) and is subdivided into 15 districts. Its seat is Lahej. According to the 2004 census, it had a population of 722,694, and had an estimated population of 1,169,594 in 2025.

== History ==
The Abdali tribes inhabited the territory surrounding Lahej and the Sultanate of Lahej declared its independence its from the Imamate of Sana'a in 1728 under Fadhl ibn Ali al-Abdali. The sultanate subsequently controlled territory surrounding Aden. Following the British occupation of Aden in 1839, the sultanate entered into an agreement with the British in 1849, by which the British paid a stipend to the sultanate in exchange for protecting its trade routes. It was occupied by Ottoman Empire during the First World War. It became part of South Yemen's People's Republic in 1967 and subsequently became part of the unified Republic of Yemen in 1990.

== Geography ==
Lahej is one of the governorates of Yemen. It is located on the southwestern part of the country, approximately 337 km (209 mi) northwest of the national capital Sana'a. It is bordered by Al-Bayda and Ad Dali Governorates to the north, Aden Governorate and the Gulf of Aden to the south, Abyan Governorate to the east, and Taiz Governorate to the west and northwest. It occupies an area of approximately 12,648 km^{2} (4,883 sq mi), and has its seat at Lahej (Al Hawtah).

Lahej governorate is located at an average altitude of 448 m (1,470 ft). It experiences hot summers and mild winters. The maximum temperature ranges from 19 to 40 °C (66 to 104 °F). It receives very low rainfall with annual precipitation ranging from 3 to 15 cm (1.2 to 5.9 in). The mountainous regions receive rainfall during the summer and the coastal areas get rainfall during the winter.

== Administration and sub-divisions ==
The governorate is administered by a local council consisting of 15 members and the governor. Al Mahwit Governorate is divided into 15 districts.

Districts
District	Size (km²)	Population (2025 est.)		
District	Size (km²)	Female	Male	Total
Al Had	263	83,612	42,528	41,084
Al Hawtah	1,849	43,079	21,911	21,168
Al Madaribah Wa Al Arah	1,849	70,882	36,051	34,831
Al Maflahy	150	59,279	30,152	29,127
Al Maqatirah	476	88,259	44,890	43,369
Al Milah	1,402	45,394	23,087	22,307
Al Musaymir	533	48,544	24,691	23,853
Al Qabbaytah	1,024	151,724	77,171	74,553
Habil Jabr	647	66,837	33,995	32,842
Halimayn	279	44,490	22,628	21,862
Radfan	615	71,777	36,507	35,270
Tuban	1,528	146,785	74,658	72,127
Tur Al Bahah	1,883	74,974	38,134	36,840
Yafa'a	295	115,649	58,821	56,828
Yahr	244	58,309	29,657	28,652
Total	13,036	1,169,594	594,881	574,713

== Demographics ==
According to the 2004 population census, Al Mahwit Governorate had a population of 722,694. The population was estimated to be 875,000 in 2011. According to a 2025 report, the governorate had an estimated population of 1,169,594, of which 594,881 were males and 574,713 were females.

== Economy ==
Agriculture is the principal economic activity and the governorate contributes to approximately four percent of Yemen's total agricultural output. Major crops include vegetables and fodder crops. Lahej is particularly known for its cultivation of Arabian jasmine, introduced to the region in the 1930s. A World Bank-supported agricultural development project identified Lahej among five governorates selected for interventions in rain-fed agriculture and livestock production. As per a report by the United Nations Development Programme in 2026, irrigation canals were constructed to improve water access for agriculture. Other economic activities include quarrying, mining of clay, and manufacture of construction materials.

In 2014, approximately 69% of the population lived in poverty. Locally generated revenues accounted for only 2% of the local authority's budget, with the remainder coming from government grants and subsidies.

== See also ==
- Rada'a
