= 2010 Aden intelligence headquarters attack =

Prison raid in Yemen

- Part of the al-Qaeda insurgency in Yemen
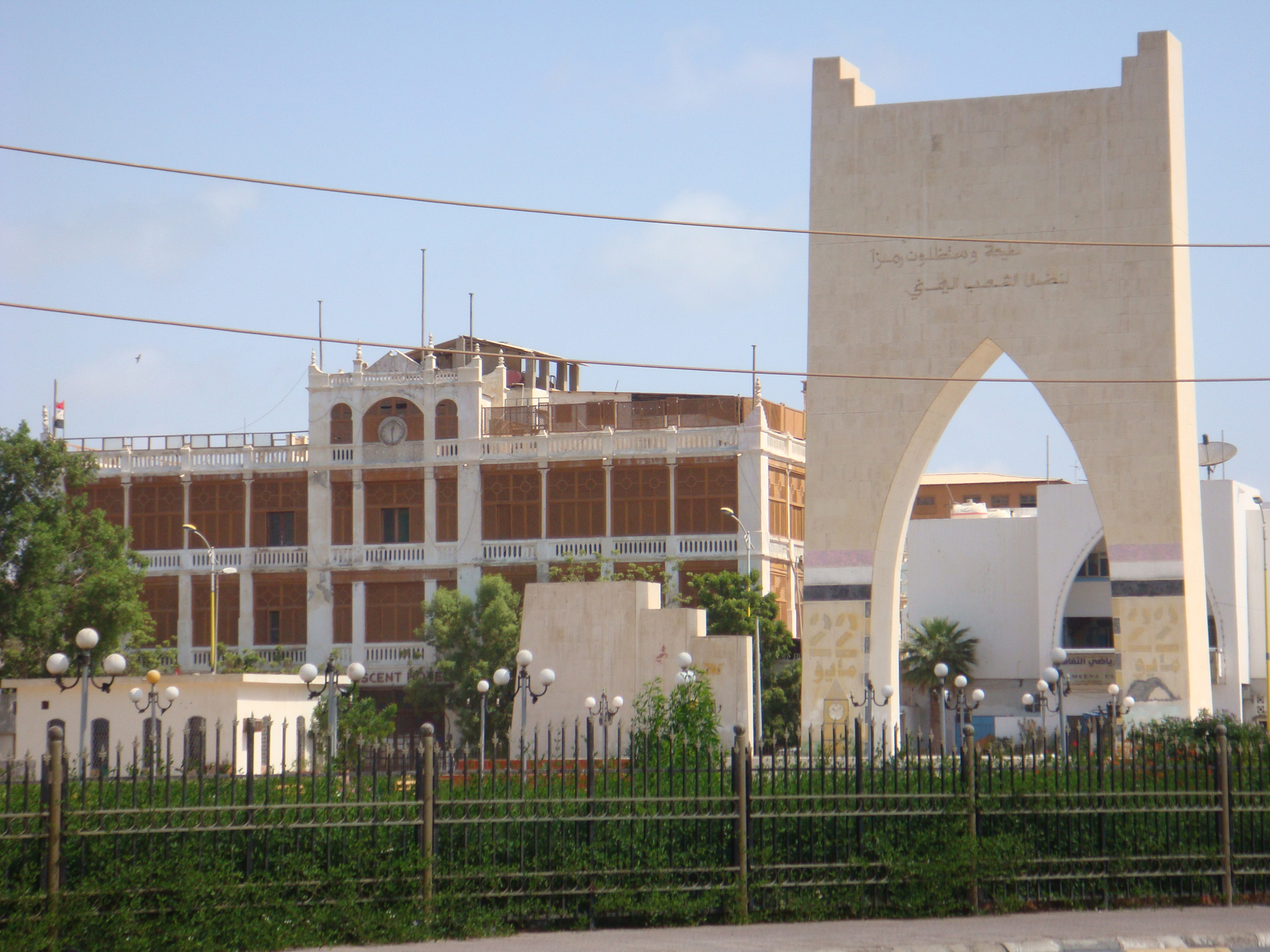
- The Crescent Hotel, where the militants parked their vehicles before undergoing the attack
- Location of the attack
- Location: 12°47′0.7″N 44°58′38″E; Aden, Yemen
- Date: 19 June 2010; 07:40 (UTC+03:00)
- Target: Political Security Organization regional headquarters
- Attack type: Raid
- Weapons: Automatic rifles; rocket-propelled grenades; hand grenades; mortars
- Deaths: 11
- Injuries: 9
- Perpetrator: Al-Qaeda in the Arabian Peninsula
- No. of participants: 4

On 19 June 2010, the regional headquarters of the Political Security Organization in Aden, Yemen, was attacked by four gunmen. Al-Qaeda in the Arabian Peninsula (AQAP) had issued a statement the day before threatening the Yemeni government for military operations against the group. The heavily armed attackers opened fire at the entrance to the intelligence agency building and stormed through, freeing several imprisoned militants and escaping unharmed. 11 people—seven security officers, three women, and a child—were killed, and nine others were injured. AQAP claimed responsibility for the attack in July.

Authorities arrested several suspects in the days after the attack including alleged mastermind Goudol Mohammed Ali Naji, who was arranged for trial in September of that year but escaped detention in 2011. The attack caught the government by surprise, as acknowledged by information minister Hasan al-Lawzi. The death of Ahmed Darwish, who was among those arrested, prompted protests in Aden and became a rallying cry for the Southern Movement. Analysts considered the attack a major coup for AQAP and said it represented a shift from the targeting Western interests to Yemeni state institutions.

== Background ==
The Yemeni government escalated its campaign against al-Qaeda in the Arabian Peninsula (AQAP) in the aftermath of the attempted bombing of an American airliner in late 2009 linked to the group. Having "declared war on the group" earlier in 2010, Yemen began receiving increased support for military operations from the United States, putting AQAP under further pressure.

A military operation in Wadi Abidah, Marib Governorate, was launched in early June after the ambush of an army convoy attributed to AQAP. This was preceded by heightened tensions in the region after an airstrike accidentally killed the deputy governor in May. Capitalizing off public anger, AQAP issued a statement on June 18, a day prior to the attack, vowing revenge for the airstrikes and alleged deaths of civilians in Marib. It threatened to "set the ground on fire beneath the tyrant infidels of [Yemeni president] Ali Saleh's regime and his American collaborators". Earlier statements by AQAP had called for the freeing of imprisoned militants.

The target of the attack was the regional headquarters of the Political Security Organization, a powerful domestic intelligence agency, in Yemen's second-largest city Aden. Located in Tawahi district along the coast, the neighborhood contained many government institutions including the state television headquarters and a Ministry of Transport branch, each located adjacent to the intelligence building. The facility held a major role in counterterrorism operations against AQAP but had been more recently concerned with the southern separatist movement. AQAP's nearest hideout to Aden was eastwards in the mountainous Abyan Governorate.

== Attack ==
The attackers arrived outside the intelligence building in two vehicles at approximately 07:40 on 19 June. A witness said they parked a sedan and a minibus at the nearby Crescent Hotel before approaching the building. They were a four-man group dressed in military attire. Time reported two of the attackers wore niqabs as disguises.

Armed with automatic rifles, rocket-propelled grenades, hand grenades, and mortars, the militants opened fire on the main entrance and those guarding it before storming through amidst gunfire. According to an official, security forces present were caught off guard as they were conducting a flag ceremony, leading to a high degree of casualties. The militants also shot at women and children outside the building and employees and civilians within it.

An intense shootout lasted over an hour and left some parts of the building on fire. Some guards reportedly deserted during the firefight. The gunmen pushed through the central courtyard and into the detention area. Local officials confirmed an unspecified number of detainees linked to al-Qaeda broke free. Witnesses spotted them escaping the scene alongside the attackers in a minibus.

The fire was later put out and the army was deployed to secure the area. Seven security officers were killed in the attack along with three female cleaners and a seven-year-old boy. A further nine people were wounded according to security officials. A witness counted ten bodies, dead and wounded, being transported by ambulances. Officials at a hospital in Aden counted at least 15 victims there, but did not specify whether they included those killed. The attackers did not suffer any casualties.

== Responsibility ==
There was not an immediate claim of responsibility for the attacks, but the government quickly attributed it to al-Qaeda. Hakim Almasmari, editor-in-chief of Yemen Post, said the facial features of the attackers resembled that of southerners. He said the perpetrators could belong to AQAP or the southern separatists.

AQAP went on to claim responsibility for the attack in a statement released on 11 July. It attributed it to the "Jamil al-Anbari Brigades", referencing an AQAP member killed by a US airstrike earlier in March. The statement claimed the attackers killed all 24 security personnel present in the building, diverging from official casualty figures, and denied any relation to Goudol Mohammed Ali Naji, whom the government labeled the mastermind of the attack. They cited it as a response to the military operations in Marib which they claimed had only harmed civilians and infrastructure and was meant to humiliate the tribes. It also vowed revenge for a military operation in 2009.

== Investigation ==
A resident said security forces conducted a cordon and search within the neighbourhood after the attack, arresting several suspects Checkpoints were established by police across Aden. The government probed for potential elements in the security apparatus who may have aided the attackers.

The next day, security forces announced the arrest of Naji, who they claimed was the ringleader and mastermind of the attack. Naji was accused of being a veteran al-Qaeda militant whose cell was involved in the robbery of an Arab Bank branch in Aden in late 2009. He reportedly appeared in an Al Jazeera broadcast alongside a group of al-Qaeda members giving a public speech threatening revenge for airstrikes against a training camp in December of that year. The Supreme Security Committee reported that a preliminary investigation determined the attack "carried the hallmark of al-Qaeda".

A pre-dawn search of a residential area in Aden on 25 June triggered a firefight which ended in the arrest of multiple suspected militants. Authorities extracted information from Naji which indicated the perpetrators of the attack would host a meeting that day. Officials did not publicly divulge how many suspects were arrested, but sources speaking to Yemen Observer said the total number was seven.

By 26 June, authorities had detained 30 people over two days, nine of whom were held in connection to the attack. Most arrests occurred in the Saadah and al-Nasr neighborhoods in Khor Maksar, known for high criminal and militant activity. One of the nine arrested, Ahmed Darwish, had died in custody. Authorities said it was the result of an asthma attack, but opposition protesters claimed it was due to torture.

In September 2010, Naji was referred to the Specialized Criminal Prosecution of Aden for trial on charges of masterminding the attack. Naji told authorities he funded the operation with YRI 20 million he acquired from the 2009 bank robbery. He said that one of the assailants, Mohammed Hilal Mughalis, was killed in another attack on the intelligence headquarters in Zinjibar, Abyan, later in 2010. Authorities were still searching for seven other suspects in relation to the attack by then. The trial of Naji had been suffering from delays by November 2011. On 12 December 2011, hw escaped from the al-Mansoura prison alongside 15 other militants through a tunnel.

== Response ==
The government was likely surprised by the occurrence of an attack in Aden, considered the "southern capital" of the country. President Saleh fired two senior officials in the Political Security Organization later in the day for security lapses. Minister of Information Hasan al-Lawzi said "we were hit where we least expected it", and called the attack a notable escalation. Presidential advisor and former prime minister Abdul Karim al-Iryani told The Independent that AQAP now had the strength to inflict major damage on the state, but that the southern secessionists were still the more existential threat.

The Supreme Security Committee condemned the attack, as did a government statement reported by Saba News Agency, which said that terrorism "damaged the reputation of Yemen and harmed the national economy and the process of investment and tourism." A Ministry of Interior statement later urged the security apparatus to enact further safety measures in Aden to prevent another terrorist attack, acknowledging it as "the economic capital of Yemen".

=== Death of Ahmed Darwish ===
Arrests made in the aftermath of the attack led to heightened tensions in Aden. These were inflamed following the death of Darwish, with locals holding protests accusing authorities of torturing him to death. These protests drew in the participation of southern secessionist activists. A demonstration and public funeral was held for Darwish on 7 July, coinciding with the annual "Day of Rage" event by the Southern Movement. Holding photographs of Darwish along with former South Yemeni president Ali Salem al-Beidh and the flag of South Yemen, protestors reached a hospital where they attempted to recover the body of Darwish, eventually leading to authorities firing on them and killing at least one protestor. After refusing to bury him for over a year, Darwish's family held his funeral on 24 June 2011 after a former official war charged with his death. Security forces fired on the procession and killed one southern activist. The New York Times reported that Darwish became "a symbol in the city of the security forces' brutality".

== Analysis ==
News media reports and experts referred to the attack as "bold", "brazen", and "devastating", a success for AQAP and an unprecedented embarrassment for the government of Yemen. Ahmed al-Haj of the Associated Press considered it the most sophisticated by AQAP since the intensified counterterrorism campaign began. Analyst Mansour Hael questioned the attackers' ability to breach such a high-security area, regarding the attack as a demonstration of the government's weakness. Mustafa Alani of the Gulf Research Center called it "a show of strength" in the wake of increasing pressure on AQAP's safe havens, while analysts Nasser Arrabyee and Ali Seif Hassan considered it a case of AQAP exploiting the Political Security Organization's preoccupation with the southern secessionists.

Saba Strategic Studies Centre terrorism analyst Mohammed Saif Haidar called the attack a direct challenge to the authority of the security forces, while Andrew McGregor of the Jamestown Foundation noted theories that the attack was meant to appeal to tribes which had recently began agreeing to expel AQAP elements from their territory.

Reuters noted the attack was a rare case of AQAP directly targeting the Yemeni state, indicating a shift towards targeting Yemeni government institutions rather than strictly Western interests. By November, it was cited by Katherine Zimmerman of Critical Threats as the first operation in a campaign of attacks against government targets and officials throughout the year. An attack on the Political Security Organization headquarters in the nearby city Zinjibar in July was noted for utilizing similar tactics to the Aden attack. Political analyst Abdulghani al-Iryani said the attacks were provoking fear within the military.

== See also ==
- 2006 Sanaa prison escape
