= Political Security Organization (Yemen) =

Yemeni intelligence organization

Agency overview
- Formed: 1992
- Jurisdiction: Government of Yemen
- Headquarters: Sana'a, Aden

The Political Security Organization (Arabic: جهاز الأمن السياسي, romanized: Jihaz Alamin Alsiyasii) (PSO) is a state security and intelligence-gathering agency of Yemen. Formed in 1992, the PSO collects and analyzes domestic and foreign intelligence to ensure the safety of the Yemeni state, though the organization became more well known for repressing political opponents of Yemeni President Ali Abdullah Saleh. Since the establishment of the National Security Bureau (NSB) in 2002, the PSO's role in intelligence-gathering has been reduced but is still significant.

== Background ==
Prior to their unification, both North Yemen and South Yemen maintained their own internal security agencies. Security in the northern Yemeni Arab Republic was managed by the National Security Bureau, while the southern People's Democratic Republic of Yemen mainly utilized the Ministry for State Security.

Just before the unification of Yemen in May 1990, both the National Security Bureau and the Ministry for State Security were abolished by their respective governments. A combined security service was established as part of the Ministry of Interior.

== History ==
The PSO was established in Presidential Decree No. 121 in 1992, merging the intelligence agencies of the North and South governments two years after the unification of Yemen. The PSO was reportedly involved in the recruitment of Yemeni returnees from the Soviet–Afghan War for government usage against southern separatists in the Yemeni civil war of 1994. Major General Ali Mohsen al-Ahmar facilitated the enlistment of many Islamists associated with the Islah party due to their hostility to the socialists in the south.

The PSO began being involved in countering the presence of al-Qaeda in Yemen after the USS Cole bombing in October 2000. The United States cooperated with the PSO in the investigation into the bombing, though this collaboration was put into jeopardy in 2001 when PSO officer Abdul Salam al-Hilah was discovered to be a member of al-Qaeda, and was subsequently captured and detained at Guantanamo Bay. The PSO came under further scrutiny in February 2006 when 23 members of al-Qaeda escaped from a PSO detention center and later organized the revival of the group in Yemen. The escape was widely presumed to be an inside job in some part facilitated by members of the PSO.

In response to American reluctance to working with the PSO thereafter, President Ali Abdullah Saleh created the National Security Bureau in 2002 with US support and financing. While the PSO and the NSB cooperated at times, they mostly operated independently and engaged in a power struggle within the Yemeni government. President Saleh likely created the NSB, which was headed by his brother Colonel Ammar Mohammed Abdullah Saleh, in reaction to the heavy presence of jihadists within the PSO which may have jeopardized his rule. After the 2006 prison escape, the status of the NSB was significantly boosted, with the most qualified officers to it rather than the PSO and foreign governments preferring to work with it in countering al-Qaeda. While the NSB was originally meant to replace the PSO, Ali Mohsen al-Ahmar worked against its phasing out, leading to the coexistence of the two.

In March 2014, as a part of President Abdrabbuh Mansur Hadi's government reshuffle, the PSO's longtime director Ghaleb al-Qamesh was dismissed in place for Jalal al-Rowaishan. Rowaishan was later replaced by Hamoud al-Sofi in November 2014. Abdu al-Hudhaifi was announced to be the new PSO chief during Hadi's controversial December 2015 cabinet reshuffle.

=== Yemeni civil war ===
Following the takeover of Sanaa in September 2014, the Houthis seized control of the PSO and NSB and took files, records and equipment belonging to the organizations. Similarly to other institutions in the midst of the Yemeni civil war, the Hadi-led government maintains its own appointments to the PSO and NSB in the areas under its control.

While the initially their activities remained the same, the PSO and NSB were slowly absorbed into the intelligence apparatus of the Houthis, who injected their own members into them. In August 2019, the Houthis merged the PSO and NSB under the areas which they control with and replaced them with a single organization headed by former Deputy Minister of Interior Abdul Hakim al-Khaiwani, the Security and Intelligence Service (SIS).

In January 2024, Presidential Leadership Council (PLC) head Rashid al-Alimi announced the merger of the PSO and NSB under areas of their control along with similar organizations belonging to the government-allied Southern Transitional Council (STC) into a single agency under PLC leadership as the Central Agency for State Security. The move was rejected and denounced by the STC as unilateral.

== Activities ==
The primary goal of the PSO as listed in its establishment is to "identify and combat political crimes and acts of sabotage." In practice, the PSO assured the interests of President Saleh during his presidency and neutralized any threats to his regime. For this goal, the PSO practiced harassment, beatings, torture, forced disappearances and arbitrary detention against political opponents, including those affiliated or sympathizing with the Southern Movement, the Houthis and al-Qaeda. According to Human RIghts Watch, PSO agents have infiltrated independent press, syndicates, and civic organizations and in some cases have forced said agencies to cease activities. In several cases the PSO has imprisoned journalists for criticism of the government.

== Structure ==
The upper ranks of the PSO is composed exclusively of former army officers who report directly to the President of Yemen rather than the Ministry of Interior, though it acts as an independent entity outside of any judicial control or supervision. As of 2013, the PSO has approximately 120,000 listed members, though this statistic is likely to be heavily bloated due to the prominence of ghost members. A Yemeni intelligence officer claimed in an interview with the International Crisis Group that only 30 or 40 percent of the people listed on PSO payroll are actually workers for the organization.

Under the degree which created it, the PSO was given the power to arrest and detain people and hold them in its independently operated detention centers. The organization is also granted the ability to conduct large scale investigations with their officers holding the same authority as of judicial enforcement officers.

== See also ==
- National Security Bureau
- Central Security Organization
