= Mohamed Abdullah al-Kawsi =

Yemeni politician

Minister of Interior of Yemen Disputed
- In office 28 November 2016* – 13 December 2017
- President: Saleh Ali al-Sammad
- Prime Minister: Abdel-Aziz bin Habtour
- Preceded by: Jalal al-Rowaishan
- Succeeded by: Abdelhakim Ahmed al-Mawri

Military service
- Allegiance: Yemen
- Rank: Major general
- *Kawsi's term has been disputed by Hussein Arab.

Mohamed Abdullah al-Kawsi is a Yemeni officer who served as the Interior minister in the Houthi-run government from 28 November 2016 until 10 December 2017.
