= Mutaher al-Masri =

Yemeni politician

Minister of Interior
- In office 9 May 2008 – 7 December 2011
- President: Ali Abdullah Saleh
- Prime Minister: Ali Mohammed Mujawar
- Preceded by: Rashad al-Alimi
- Succeeded by: Abdul Qader Qahtan

Personal details
- Born: Dhamar Governorate, (Yemen)
- Party: General People's Congress

Mutaher Rashad al-Masri is a Yemeni politician. He was minister of the interior from 9 May 2008 to 7 December 2011. Following the anti-government protests in Yemen, President Ali Abdullah Saleh fired all members of the Cabinet of Yemen on 20 March 2011. They will remain in function until a new government is formed.

== See also ==
- Cabinet of Yemen
