= Abdulelah Haider Shaye =

Yemeni journalist (born c. 1977)

Abdulelah Haider Shaye, (Arabic: عبد الإله شائع) or Abd al-Ilah Haydar Al-Sha’i (born c. 1977), is a prominent Yemeni investigative journalist best known for his reporting of the December 17, 2009 U.S. cruise missile strike on al-Majalah in southern Yemen, his interviews with al-Qaeda leaders, and the controversial nature of his arrest and imprisonment in 2011.

In 2011, Shaye was arrested, beaten, and held in solitary confinement for 34 days in Yemen. He was eventually tried and convicted of terrorism-related charges and sentenced to five years in prison, followed by two years of restricted movement and government surveillance. His conviction and sentencing was deeply unpopular with the Yemeni populace. On February 2, 2011, President Obama called then-Yemeni President Ali Abdullah Saleh to discuss counterterrorism cooperation and al-Qaeda in the Arabian Peninsula. At the end of the call, according to a White House read-out, Obama "expressed concern" over the release of Shaye. Shaye had not been released at the time of the call, but Saleh did have a pardon prepared. Consequently, Shaye was not released until 2013.

Shaye is related by marriage to the radical Islamic cleric Abdul Majid al-Zindani and he has used this relationship and other connections to gain access to al-Qaeda leaders, including the late Yemeni-American Muslim cleric Anwar al-Awlaki.

In 2013, Shaye won a Alkarama Human Rights Defenders award in Geneva for his work covering US actions in Yemen against al-Qaida in the Arabian Peninsula (AQIP), which were initially portrayed as originating from Yemeni authorities.

== Reporting on al-Majalah bombing ==
Shaye reported that the site of the al-Majalah bombing was littered with remnants of U.S. Tomahawk missiles and cluster munitions, contradicting claims by the government of Yemen that the bombing was their own. U.S. responsibility was denied by Pentagon officials but later confirmed by Amnesty International, The Telegraph newspaper, and a release of leaked diplomatic cables. He also reported that 21 children and 14 women had been killed in the bombing.

== Imprisonment ==
On August 16, 2010, Shaye was arrested by the Yemeni government. After 34 days of confinement, he was convicted of terrorism-related charges as an al-Qaeda operative and sentenced to five years imprisonment. Several observers characterized the legal proceedings as a show trial, including Amnesty International, Human Rights Watch, the Committee to Protect Journalists, and the International Federation of Journalists as a sham trial. After a public outcry from tribal leaders in Yemen over Shaye's imprisonment, Yemeni president Ali Abdullah Saleh was prepared to release Shaye, but he was allegedly influenced against the release after a telephone call from U.S. President Barack Obama on February 2, 2011 citing his concern over Shaye's imminent release.

Journalist Jeremy Scahill reported that, according to his anonymous sources in Yemen, Saleh rescinded his pardon primarily due to the call from President Obama. Scahill also suggested Yemen's counter-terrorism funding from the United States may have motivated Saleh's cooperation. When asked for comment on Scahill's investigations, U.S. officials in a written statement said: "Shai’s imprisonment has nothing to do with his journalism [and] Sha’i is in jail because he was facilitating AQAP and its planning for attacks on Americans and therefore, we have a very direct interest in his case and his imprisonment."

On July 23, 2013, Shaye was released from prison to serve out the remaining two years of his five-year sentence under house arrest.

== In media ==
- Dirty Wars, a 2013 American documentary directed by Richard Rowley, and written by Jeremy Scahill and David Riker.
