= Avocado (disambiguation) =

The avocado is a tree, and also its fruit which is often used for culinary purposes.

Avocado may also refer to:

- Avocado (color), a shade of green resembling the flesh of an avocado fruit
- Project Avocado, affording additional military powers to the United States president
- Pearl Jam (album), a music album by the band Pearl Jam, sometimes known as Avocado due to the avocado on the cover
