= Ghaleb al-Qamesh =

Yemeni politician and intelligence official (born 1948)

Ghaleb Mutahar al-Qamesh

Chief of Security Political Office
- In office 1980–2014
- President: Ali Abdullah Saleh, Abdrabbuh Mansur Hadi
- Succeeded by: Jalal al-Rowaishan

Minister of Interior
- In office May 1990 – 1993
- President: Ali Abdullah Saleh
- Prime Minister: Haidar Abu Bakr al-Attas
- Succeeded by: Yahya al-Matwakel

Personal details
- Born: 1948 (age 77–78) Karif, Amran

Ghaleb Mutahar al-Qamesh (Arabic: غالب مطهر القمش; born 1948) is a Yemeni politician, military and intelligence official. He served as chief of the Political Security Organization, Yemen's intelligence agency, for more than three decades.

== Early life and education ==
Ghaleb was born in Kharif District, Amran Governorate, in 1948. He studied his basic education and grew up in his village al-Assyah in Kharif of Amran northern Yemen. He joined the Military Academy in Sana'a and graduated in 1968.

== Career ==
- Chief of Yemen's Political Security Office (1980–2014)
- Minister of Interior (1990–1993)
- Ambassador in the Ministry of Foreign Affairs (2014– )
