= Ibrahim Haidan =

Yemeni politician and general

Ibrahim Ali Haidan
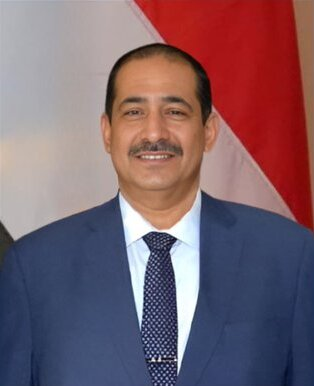

Interior Minister
- Incumbent
- Assumed office 18 December 2020
- President: Abdrabbuh Mansur Hadi, Rashad al-Alimi
- Prime Minister: Shaya al-Zindani
- Preceded by: Ahmed al-Maisari

Personal details
- Born: 1972 (age 53–54) Aden

Military service
- Allegiance: Yemen
- Rank: Major General

Ibrahim Ali Ahmed Haidan (Arabic: إبراهيم علي أحمد حيدان; born 1972) is a Yemeni military official who serves as current Interior Minister of the internationally recognized Yemeni government. On 18 December 2020 the President Abdrabbuh Mansour Hadi appointed Maj. Gen. Ibrahim Haidan as the interior minister of the Cabinet of Yemen. He is reconfirmed by the President Rashad al-Alimi on February 6, 2026.

== Early life and education ==
Ibrahim Haidan was born in 1972 in the city of Mualla in Aden, and received his primary and secondary education there. He entered the Naval College in Hodeidah Governorate and graduated with the rank of lieutenant. He held many military positions from the time of his graduation until he became senior teacher in the college. Haidan studied Command and Staff course in the Sultanate of Oman, and then moved to the United States of America to receive a qualification course. He obtained a higher fellowship certificate from the Supreme Military Academy in Sana'a.
