= 2009 United States missile strikes in Yemen =

Missile strikes on al-Qaeda

- Part of United States intervention in Yemen
- Locations of the missile strikes within Yemen
- Type: Submarine-launched cruise missile strikes; targeted killings
- Location: Al-Majalah, Arhab, and Rafadh, Yemen
- Commanded by: William H. McRaven
- Target: Al-Qaeda in the Arabian Peninsula
- Date: December 17 & 24, 2009
- Executed by: United States Armed Forces; Joint Special Operations Command
- Outcome: Tactical and strategic failure: High-ranking AQAP leaders survive; Civilian casualties utilized by AQAP in propaganda victory
- Casualties: 63 killed (including 41 civilians) (Note: 14 suspected militants and 41 civilians killed in al-Majalah (including 9 women and 21 children; excluding 4 later killed by unexploded ordnance); 3 militants killed in Arhab; 5 militants killed in Rafadh)

In 2009, the United States conducted missile strikes in Yemen against targets associated with al-Qaeda in the Arabian Peninsula (AQAP). Two strikes were launched on December 17—one at a training camp in al-Majalah, Abyan, and another at a safehouse in Arhab, Sanaa—followed by a strike on a safehouse in Rafadh, Shabwah, on December 24.

Throughout the year, the Barack Obama administration engaged in negotiations with Yemeni government for US military intervention to address the rising threat posed by AQAP. Intelligence collected by early December indicated AQAP was planning imminent attacks on American targets in Yemen, prompting Obama to authorize missile strikes by Joint Special Operations Command. The primary target was in al-Majalah, a small settlement believed to be the site of an AQAP training camp preparing an attack on the US embassy in Sanaa.

Tomahawk missiles destroyed the al-Majalah training camp and killed an estimated 14 militants, including ringleader Mohammed al-Kazemi, but also struck nearby huts of local villagers, killing 41 civilians including women and children. (Note: Four other civilians were later killed by unexploded ordnance at the site.) The strike on Arhab was followed by Yemeni grounds raids, leaving three militants dead but not the targeted commander Qasim al-Raymi. A separate strike was later launched in Rafadh where AQAP leaders Nasir al-Wuhayshi and Said Ali al-Shihri were believed to be present, but neither were among the five militants killed. Facing outrage locally, the Yemeni parliament opened an inquiry which determined a targeting error was the cause of collateral damage in al-Majalah and apologized to the victims. The Yemeni government compensated them by 2013.

Yemen publicly claimed responsibility for the strikes, but news reports quickly disclosed American involvement, and later an Amnesty International report included photographs taken from al-Majalah of munitions exclusively used by the US military. Diplomatic cables released by Wikileaks on November 28, 2010, revealed a secret agreement between top American and Yemeni officials in which the Yemeni government would take responsibility for US military operations, including the 2009 strikes.

The attempted bombing of an American airliner a day after the strikes was attributed to AQAP and prompted further US intervention in Yemen. The strikes have been considered a failure as they did not eliminate the core leadership of AQAP and led to heavy civilian casualties, the latter AQAP exploited for propaganda purposes to boost recruitment of disgruntled Yemenis. Scott Shane argued the inaugural operations permanently tarnished the US' reputation within Yemen.

== Background ==
=== Al-Qaeda resurgence ===
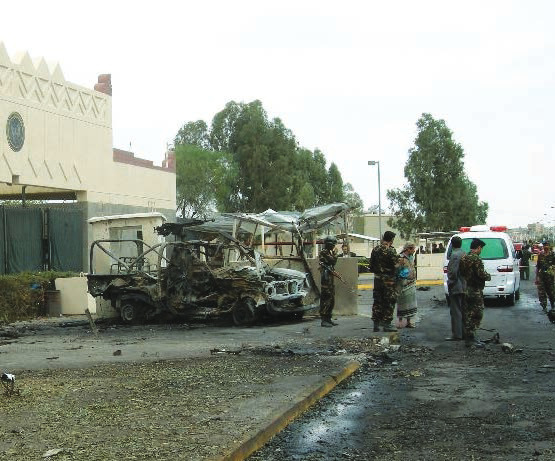
The 2008 embassy attack in Sanaa brought the al-Qaeda threat in Yemen to the attention of the United States.

The Central Intelligence Agency (CIA) conducted a covert drone strike in 2002 which killed al-Qaeda's head in Yemen, Abu Ali al-Harithi. It was the first targeted killing in the war on terror—after Deputy Secretary of Defense Paul Wolfowitz publicly leaked it, violating an agreement to maintain secrecy, the Yemeni government banned any further drone strikes in the country. Regardless, the elimination of Harithi and capture of other militants by local security forces rendered al-Qaeda effectively dismantled in Yemen by 2004. The US shifted its attention to the wars in Iraq and in Afghanistan, expecting Yemen to serve only as a potential safe haven for al-Qaeda members rather than an independent theater of jihadism. The Yemeni government also began concentrating on security matters unrelated to al-Qaeda, and ties with the George W. Bush administration cooled as the latter further emphasized democracy and human rights concerns in Yemen.

These conditions were exploited by a group of 23 jihadists who escaped from a prison in Sanaa in February 2006. The US focused on other, more notable escapees at the time, but it was Nasir al-Wuhayshi and Qasim al-Raymi who reorganized and led al-Qaeda in Yemen. Their ranks included a younger and more radical generation of jihadists intent on overthrowing the Yemeni government and refusing any dialogue with it. The group waged numerous attacks throughout the following years at an increasing rate. It had begun attacking local American targets by 2008, culminating in an attack on the US embassy in September which left at least 18 people dead and served as "a wake-up call for all of Washington."

In January 2009, the affiliates of al-Qaeda in Yemen and in Saudi Arabia announced their merger to form al-Qaeda in the Arabian Peninsula (AQAP). Based in Yemen, AQAP conducted several attacks in the country over 2009, notably a pair of bombings targeting South Koreans in March. Its regional threat was amplified following an assassination attempt on Saudi prince Muhammad bin Nayef in August.

=== Obama administration policy ===
After being inaugurated as the president of the United States, Barack Obama was only in office for a few days when a video announcing the formation of AQAP was released on January 23, 2009. Of particular concern to the government was the fact that two of the four AQAP leaders featured in the video, Saudi nationals Said Ali al-Shihri and Muhammad al-Awfi, were previously incarcerated at Guantanamo Bay detention camp. From the early stages of his presidency, Obama and his administration were intent on covert military intervention against AQAP in Yemen, though publicly their focus was still on addressing the wars in Iraq and Afghanistan. Incoming security officials in the new administration were in "complete shock" with the underdeveloped intelligence network in Yemen in relation to the substantial threat posed by AQAP, which was underscored by the embassy attack the previous year.

Deputy homeland security advisor John Brennan was Obama's primary policy advisor regarding Yemen. The planned closure of Guantanamo Bay, a priority for the Obama administration, led to complications with the Yemeni government as the US was reluctant to transfer detained Yemeni nationals to the latter's custody. Brennan's negotiations with Yemeni president Ali Abdullah Saleh to allow counterterrorism operations in the country were often linked to Saleh's demands regarding the detainees, whom he used as bargaining chips.

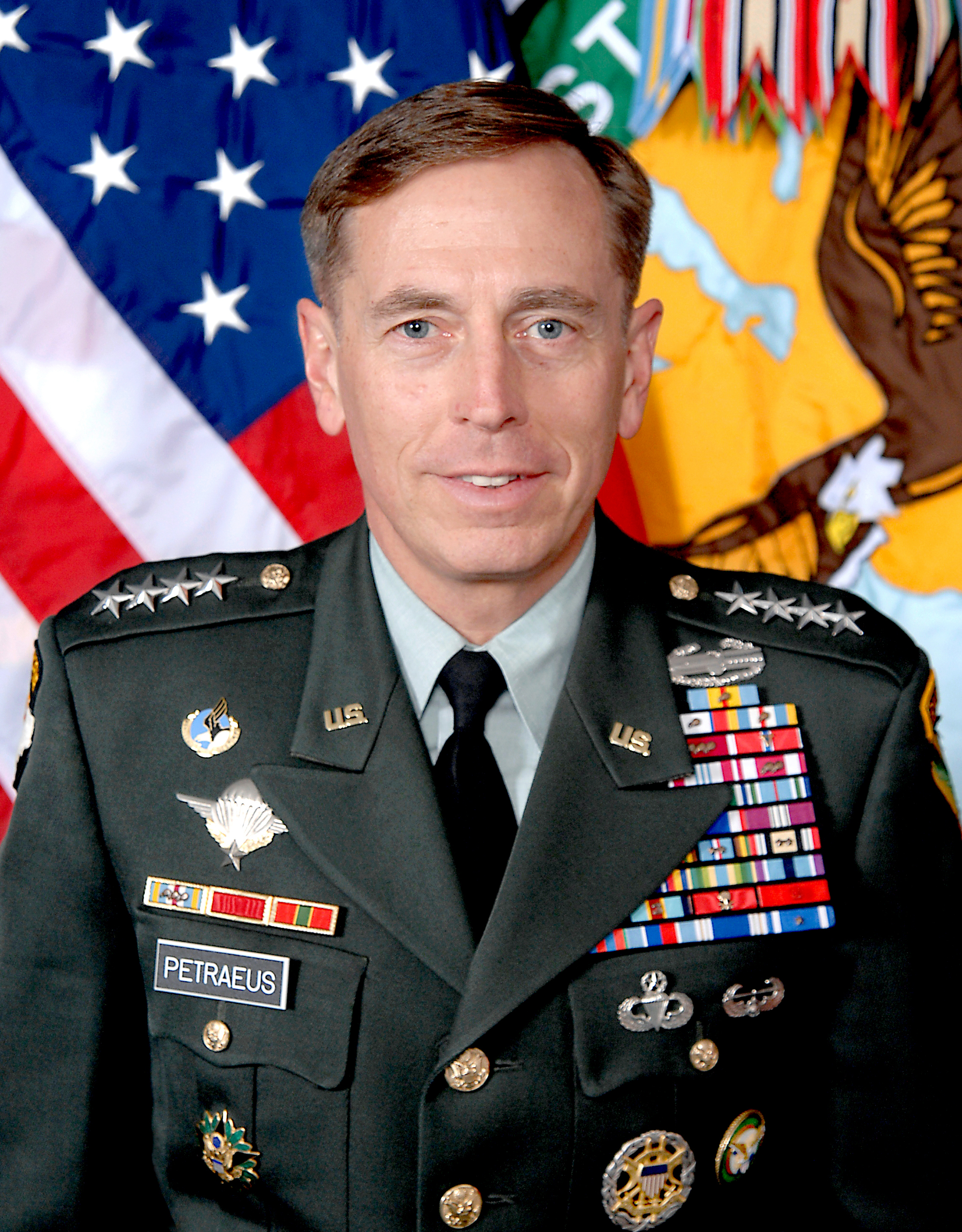
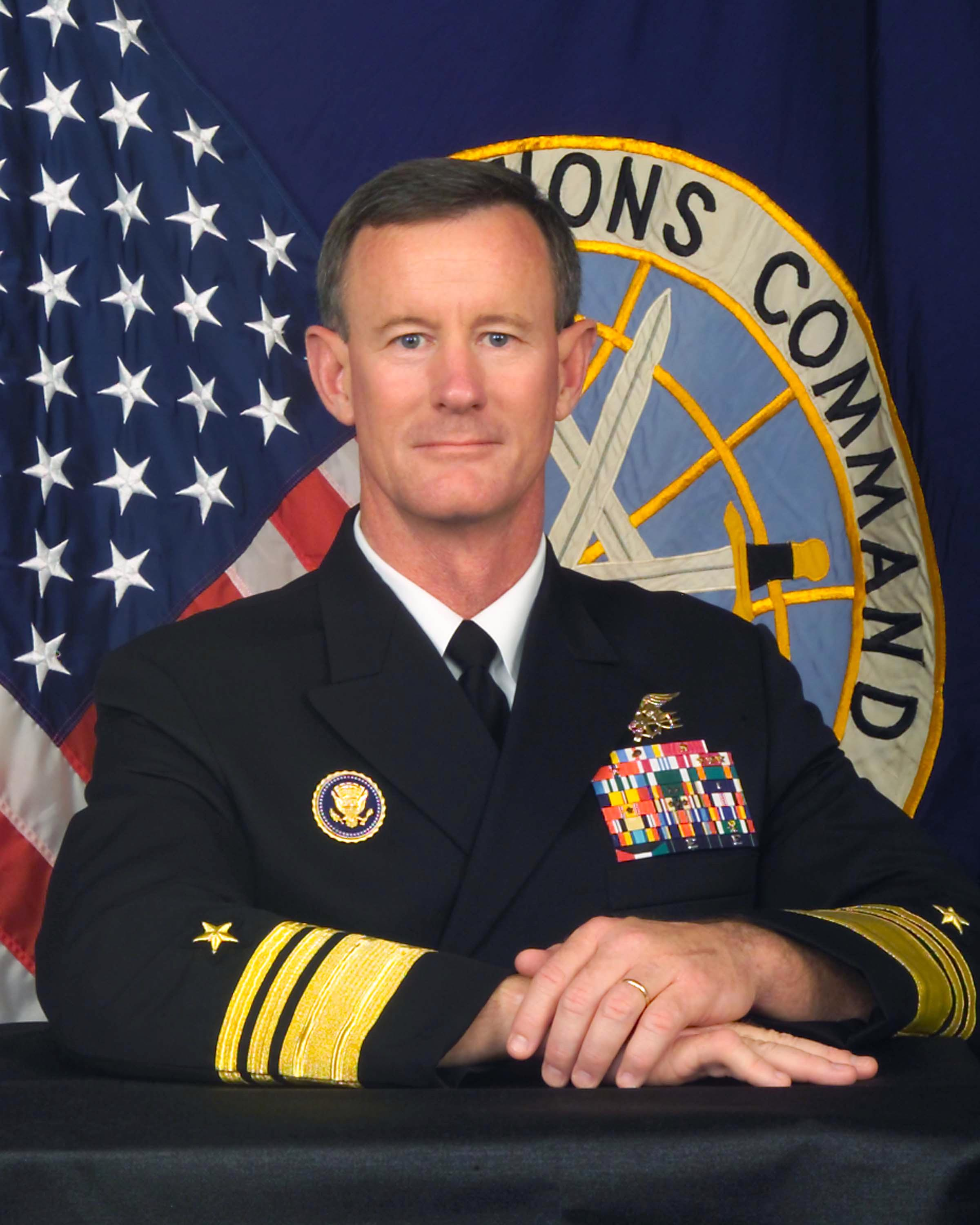
Military intervention in Yemen was overseen by General David Petraeus (left) and Vice Admiral William H. McRaven (right).

Obama opted for a military-centric approach to Yemen overseen by US Central Command head General David Petraeus and directly led by Joint Special Operations Command (JSOC) under Vice Admiral William H. McRaven. McRaven initially envisioned a counterterrorism system similar to that in Iraq where special forces would capture militant leaders, interrogate them, and utilize newfound intelligence to launch further raids. He was forced to rethink his strategy as the Obama administration believed that Saleh would not permit US military ground presence in the country or any sort of kill or capture-style operation. Petraeus authorized a directive in April for more expansive American military presence in Yemen, including unilateral strikes against AQAP.

Several senior American officials visited Yemen throughout 2009 to pressure Saleh into addressing AQAP. Saleh, in turn, proved to be more cooperative with the Americans over time. During a meeting with CIA deputy director Steven Kappes in May which focused on intelligence cooperation, Saleh made clear that he considered AQAP his main priority rather than the local Houthi insurgency or southern secessionist movement. Ambassador Stephen Seche later began informal negotiations for US aircraft to fly over Yemen's territorial waters under the pretense of combating weapons smuggling into the Gaza Strip. In July, Petraeus visited Saleh to both confirm a boost in foreign aid and urge him to directly combat AQAP. A raid by Yemeni special forces the next month targeting an AQAP cell was a failure, but assisted the US to portray the Yemeni government as directly on the frontlines against AQAP, disguising future US intervention.

The attempted assassination of Nayef further underscored with Washington the necessity of combating AQAP. When Brennan returned to Yemen in September, Saleh told him he would grant the US authority to conduct unilateral counterterrorism operations in Yemen, on the condition that he was to avoid blame for any terrorist attacks by AQAP in response. This meeting effectively served as the go-ahead for the US government to begin preparing military operations in Yemen. Later in the month, shortly after a meeting with Obama and other top officials, Petraeus signed off on the Joint Unconventional Warfare Task Force Execute Order, which authorized special forces to conduct covert operations outside of official battlefields including Yemen. The directive also permitted more expansive intelligence-gathering efforts by the military. In October, a meeting between McRaven and Saleh, ostensibly for discussing bilateral cooperation in combating AQAP, ended in Saleh granting McRaven's request for "the implementation of some special operations similar to what is happening in Pakistan and Somalia" and for JSOC to fly surveillance drones over Yemeni airspace. Secretary of State Hillary Clinton formally designated AQAP a foreign terrorist organization on December 14.

The drawdown in Iraq allowed JSOC to reassign more personnel to Yemen, leading to an expansion of the military and intelligence presence at the Sanaa embassy. The latter half of 2009 saw an uptick in analysts and agents arriving to expand intelligence-gathering on AQAP. However, this also led to further difficulties and risks for agents operating in the country and attempting to infiltrate AQAP, resulting in US agencies turning to Yemeni human intelligence, which was viewed as less reliable. Signals intelligence was therefore prioritized, with eavesdropping by the local Special Collection Service station playing a large role.

== Prelude ==
By early December 2009, the intelligence community in Yemen had acquired evidence that AQAP was in the final stages of preparing terrorist attacks on undetermined local Western targets. According to National Counterterrorism Center head Michael Leiter, the US "surged resources for targeting in Yemen" in response despite not knowing the specific threat. A months-long JSOC search determined that near the remote village of al-Majalah, Abyan Governorate, where locals had seen surveillance aircraft passing by, AQAP commander Mohammed Saleh Mohammed Ali al-Anbouri, better known as Mohammed al-Kazemi, was in charge of a training camp for suicide bombers who were likely planning to attack the US embassy in Sanaa.

A former Afghan Arab, Kazemi was arrested in 2005 by local authorities on charges related to terrorism and released in 2007. He and his family moved then to al-Majalah and he claimed to have renounced jihadism. In contrast, American intelligence reports indicated that Kazemi was an operational commander within AQAP. These reports implicated Kazemi in a 2007 suicide attack in Marib, and suggested he was in the final stages of planning the embassy attack. Strong support for military action from Petraeus was tempered with caution from national security advisor James L. Jones, who was skeptical of the quality of US intelligence in the region. Obama approved military action to interdict the pending attack. Saleh's government was also informed and quickly approved it.

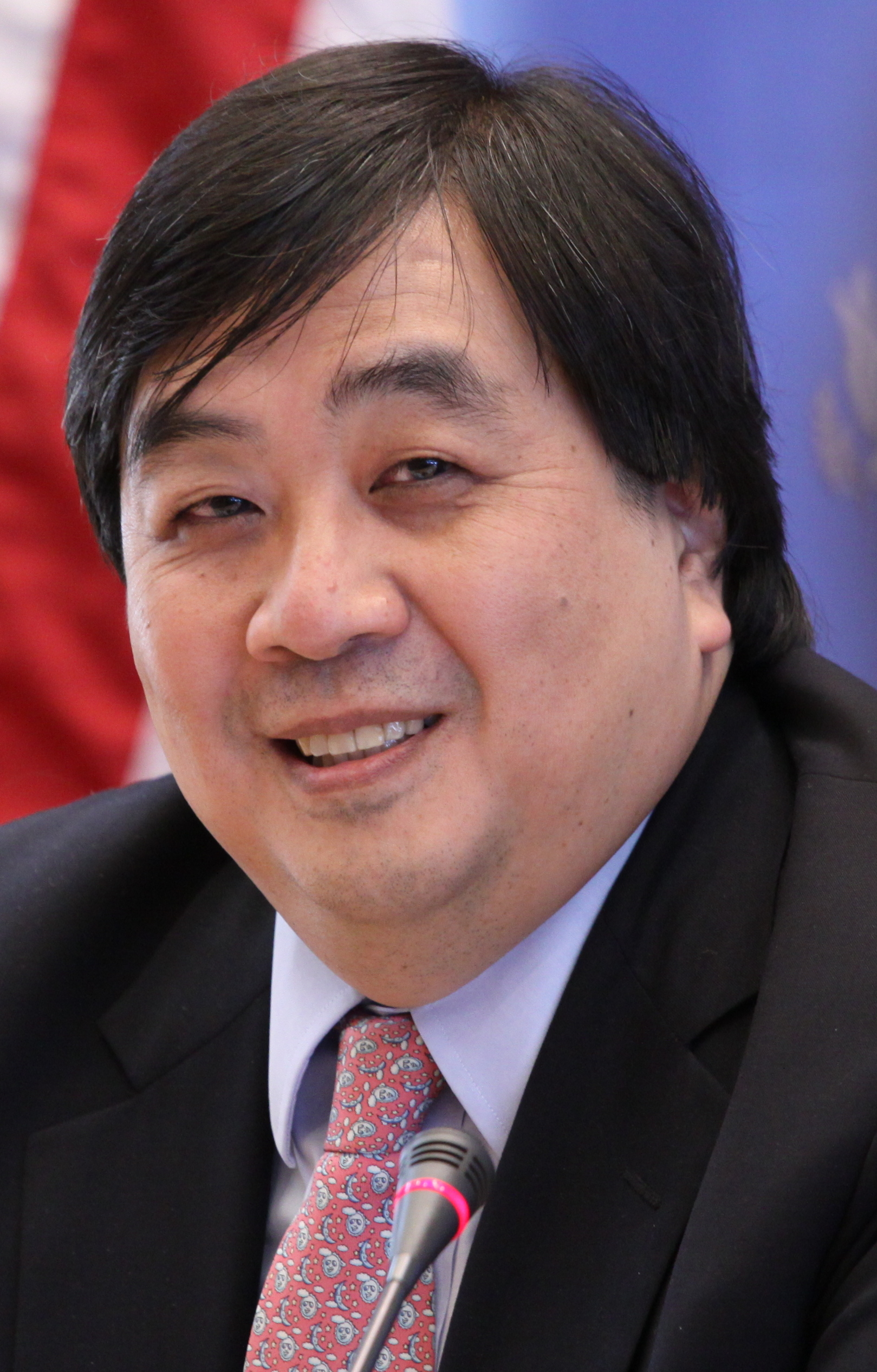
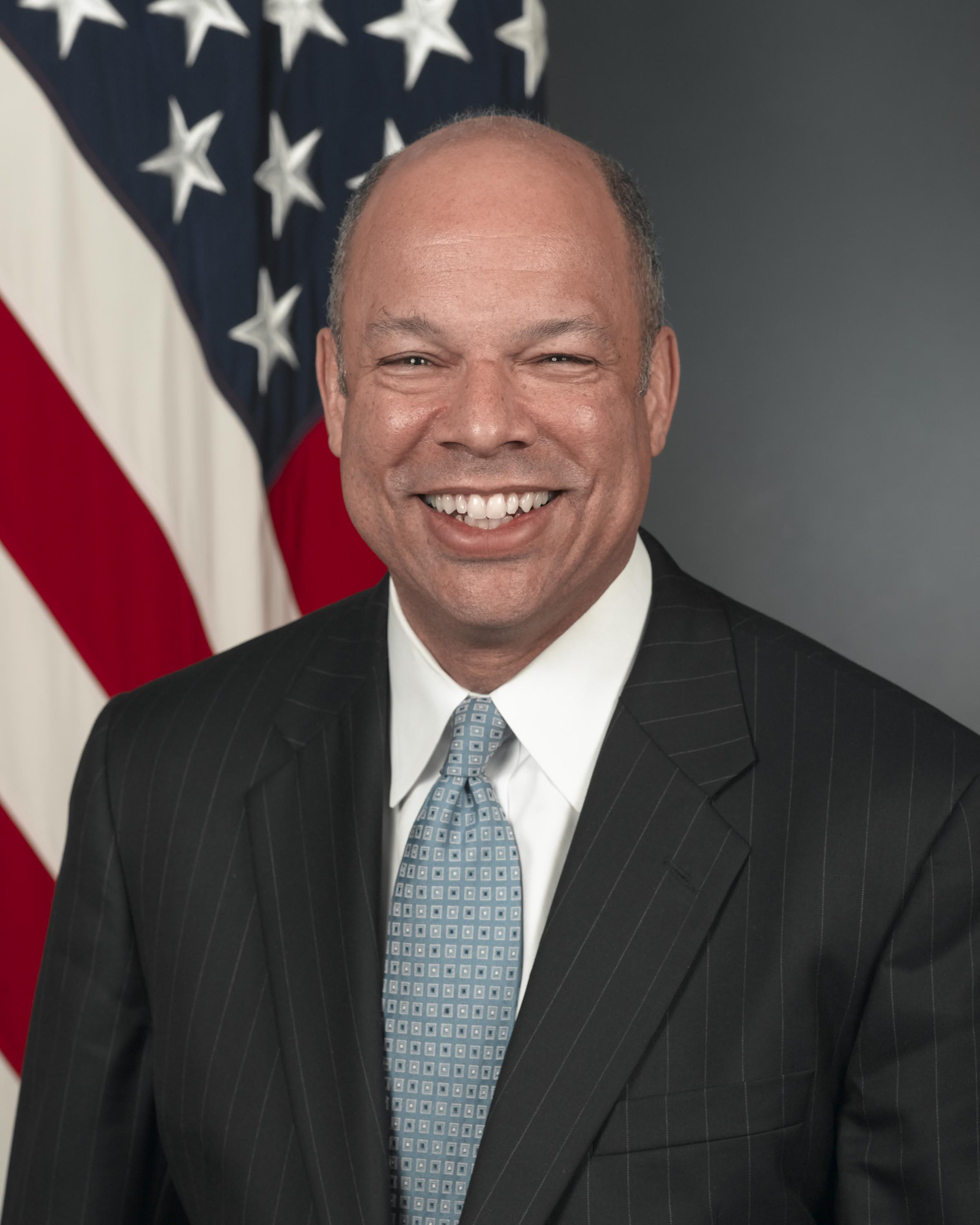
Legal advisors Harold Koh (left) and Jeh Johnson (right) believed they were not given enough time to properly judge the operation.

On December 16, McRaven headed an interagency video conference which proposed multiple targeted killings in Yemen to be conducted by JSOC within 24 hours. Under a top-secret special access program with the codename "Operation Copper Dune", JSOC planned to launch strikes against three targets given code names of several cities in Ohio. The primary target, Kazemi, was labeled "Objective Akron", and had been located at the training camp near al-Majalah, while objectives "Toledo" and "Cleveland" were identified as additional targets. Petraeus had hastily included Cleveland as a target generated from fresh intelligence on their location. State Department and Department of Defense legal advisors Harold Koh and Jeh Johnson were given 45 minutes in advance to review the intelligence on the targets and approve them from a legal perspective.

During the meeting, which involved around 75 security officials and lawyers, Johnson told deputy national security advisor Tom Donilon that he considered the strikes on Akron and Toledo legally permissible, but advised against Cleveland due to a higher likelihood of civilian casualties. The meeting also discussed the method of attack for the operation given that capturing the targets was not an option. It concluded that JSOC would utilize a US Navy submarine off the coast of Yemen armed with Tomahawk cruise missiles for the strikes. Soon after the meeting concluded JSOC launched surveillance aircraft to monitor the targets. Petraeus viewed live video feed from the locations at CENTCOM headquarters, while Johnson saw it from a command center at the Pentagon's "E" ring.

Both Koh and Johnson believed they were not given enough time to provide informed legal advice on the strikes, and were pressured by the military into approving them. The pressure to act hastily was complicated by the limitations in place at the nearest US base in the region, Camp Lemonnier in Djibouti, whose government did not permitted the military to launch armed drones from its territory. Most armed Predator and Reaper drones under JSOC control were deployed in Afghanistan regardless, leaving less favoured cruise missiles as the only available option.

== Strikes ==
=== Al-Majalah ===
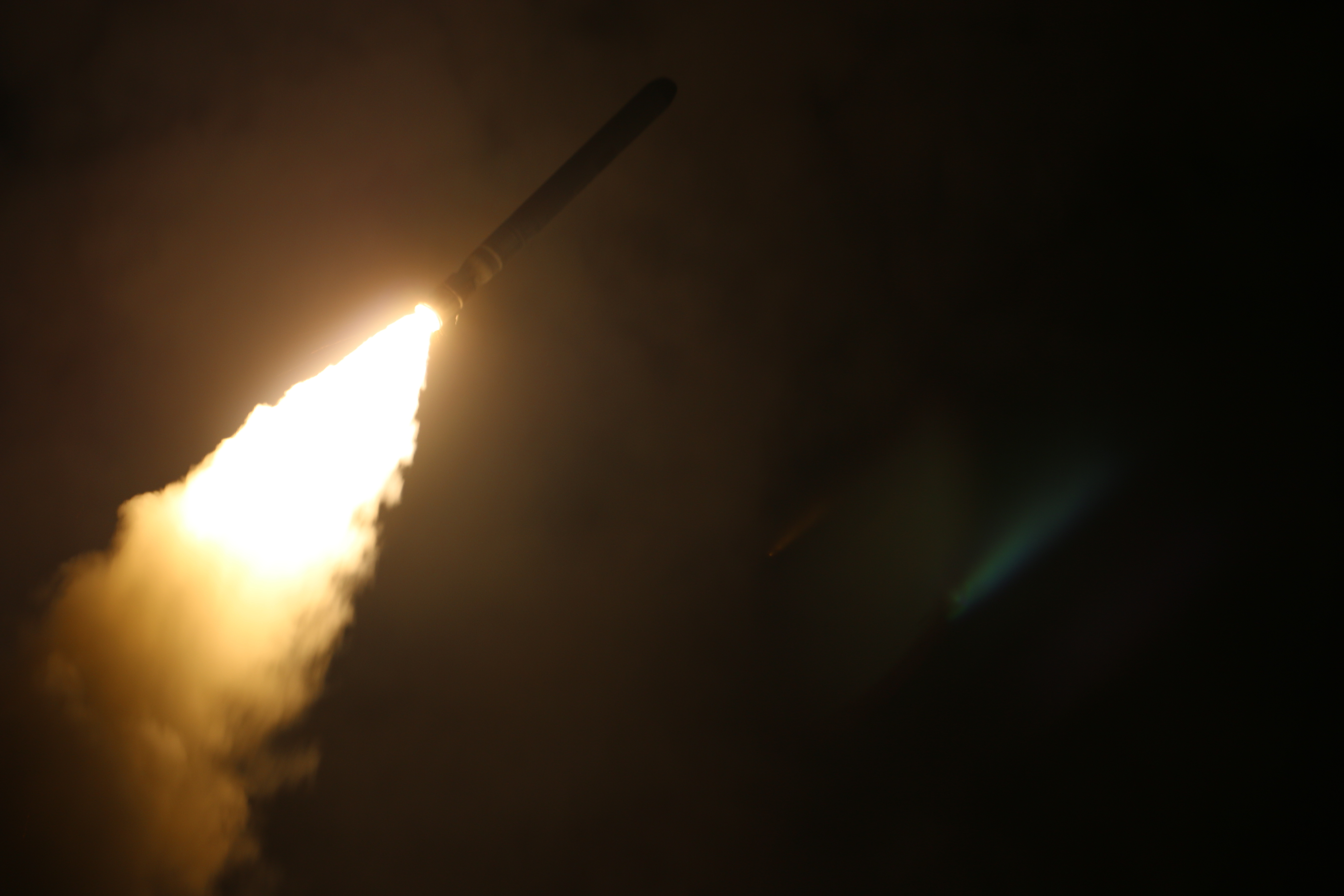
A cluster variant of the Tomahawk missile was used in the strikes.

Goats, sheep, cows, dogs, and people, you could see their bodies scattered everywhere, some many meters away. The clothes of the women and children were hanging from the treetops with the flesh on every tree, every rock. But you did not know if the flesh was of human beings or animals. Some bodies were intact but most, they melted.

— Saleh bin Fareed describing the scene at al-Majalah

The strike on al-Majalah was described by a military official as a "JSOC operation with borrowed Navy subs, borrowed Marine Corps, Air Force and Navy surveillance aircraft and close coordination with CIA and DIA on the ground in Yemen. Counting the crew of the sub we're talking 350–400 [people] in the loop." Johnson recalled viewing live surveillance footage of militants running drills at the targeted training facility. Several other American officials who viewed the surveillance corroborated the claim.

Soon after the operation was authorized, a coded message was sent out to US vessels in the Arabian Sea. At 6:00 a.m. local time on December 17, as many as five BGM-109D Tomahawk missiles were launched by a US submarine at al-Majalah, hitting a rugged area on the edge of the village. Surveillance footage captured the destruction of the training camp along with the deaths of the previously seen militants. However, in addition to the camp, the bombings also encompassed two nearby settlements of civilian huts meters away, totaling 30 homes occupied by sleeping Bedouins. American officials interviewed by Dexter Filkins of The New Yorker had "seemed genuinely perplexed" by the civilian casualties, exclusively recalling a training camp at the settlement through the surveillance footage. Filkins concluded that "the cameras missed the women and children".

According to a Yemeni official, JSOC was supposed to strike a single encampment belonging to the militants but had targeted all settlements in the area, possibly due to faulty information from Yemeni intelligence services. The specific Tomahawk model used in the attack was intentionally designed for dispersing numerous cluster munitions over a wide region. Accounting for the 166 BLU-97A/B Combined Effects submunitions loaded in one missile, as many as 830 bomblets were estimated to have struck al-Majalah. Each bomblet carries nearly 200 pieces of shrapnel and contains an incendiary intended to ignite flammable materials in the area. Of the 30 huts in the vicinity of the attack, 12 were completely destroyed while the rest were severely burned.

A Yemeni government-endorsed inquiry determined that 55 people had died in the al-Majalah strike. The inquiry reported that local authorities believed 14 suspected militants were killed, although the number was unverifiable as the only militant who was definitively identified was Kazemi. Regardless, a video released by AQAP's al-Malahem Media branch on May 26, 2010, confirmed the death of Kazemi and several other militants alongside him at al-Majalah. Six newcomers to the village who were helping Kazemi dig a well twenty days prior were killed, their bodies being extracted from the site along with some other injured men by a group of masked gunmen shortly after the strike took place.

The majority of people killed in al-Majalah were civilians. The report listed a total 41 individuals killed in the strike from two extended families; 14 from the Haydara family and 27 from the Anbouri family. Of those killed, nine were women, five of whom were pregnant, while 21 were children. Kazemi's wife and four children were among them. A leaked US cable described the civilians as "largely nomadic, Bedouin families who lived in tents near the AQAP training camp." The villagers, described as one of the poorest tribes in the region, were paid by the militants to provide shelter, food and laundry to the camp, but were likely not otherwise affiliated with AQAP. A tribesman said the locals had agreed to host the militants at their camp because they promised to dig them a well. Survivors interviewed by Human Rights Watch were not aware of Kazemi's involvement in militant activities or the presence of a training camp. Many local livestock were put out by the locals to graze at the time and were caught in the blast, with up to 1,500 goats, sheep, cows and donkeys possibly dying.

=== Arhab ===
Simultaneously with the strike on al-Majalah, another cruise missile attack was launched by JSOC on December 17 against an AQAP safehouse in Arhab district, north of Sanaa. Ground forces from Yemen's Counter-Terrorism Unit (CTU), in coordination with JSOC's Intelligence Support Activity, raided the premises shortly afterwards. The main target of the operation is believed to have been AQAP commander Qasim al-Raymi. Officials said the raid disrupted an AQAP cell involved in a plot to bomb the British embassy along with numerous other Western targets in Sanaa. US intelligence believed the militants were "en route" to Sanaa by the time of the strike.

Three would-be suicide bombers were killed, including former Guantanamo Bay detainee Hani Abdo Shaalan. The Yemeni government reported the militants died in a shootout with the CTU, although US officials contended they were killed by the missiles before Yemeni forces arrived. An AQAP obituary posted in 2011 said Shaalan was killed by US missiles rather than a gun battle.

Within the destroyed compound, CTU founded an injured militant still wearing their suicide vest and captured them. Raymi escaped the raid alongside cell leader Hizam Mujali, though his brother Arif Mujali as well as six other militants were captured. The Yemeni Embassy in Washington, D.C., uploaded a seven-minute YouTube video of CTU forces conducting the raid.

=== Rafadh ===
Nearly a week after the first two strikes, a video conference was held to determine the legality of a separate missile strike on a compound in Shabwah. Present in the meeting was the Pentagon's deputy general counsel, Robert Taylor, as well as Joint Chiefs of Staff general counsel James W. Crawford III. US and Yemeni intelligence believed their target, a farmhouse in the remote settlement of Rafadh owned by the militant Fahd al-Quso, was the site of a meeting between AQAP leaders Wuhayshi and Shihri. Among other sources, the interrogation of the would-be suicide bomber captured by the CTU in Arhab contributed towards the intelligence preceding the strike.

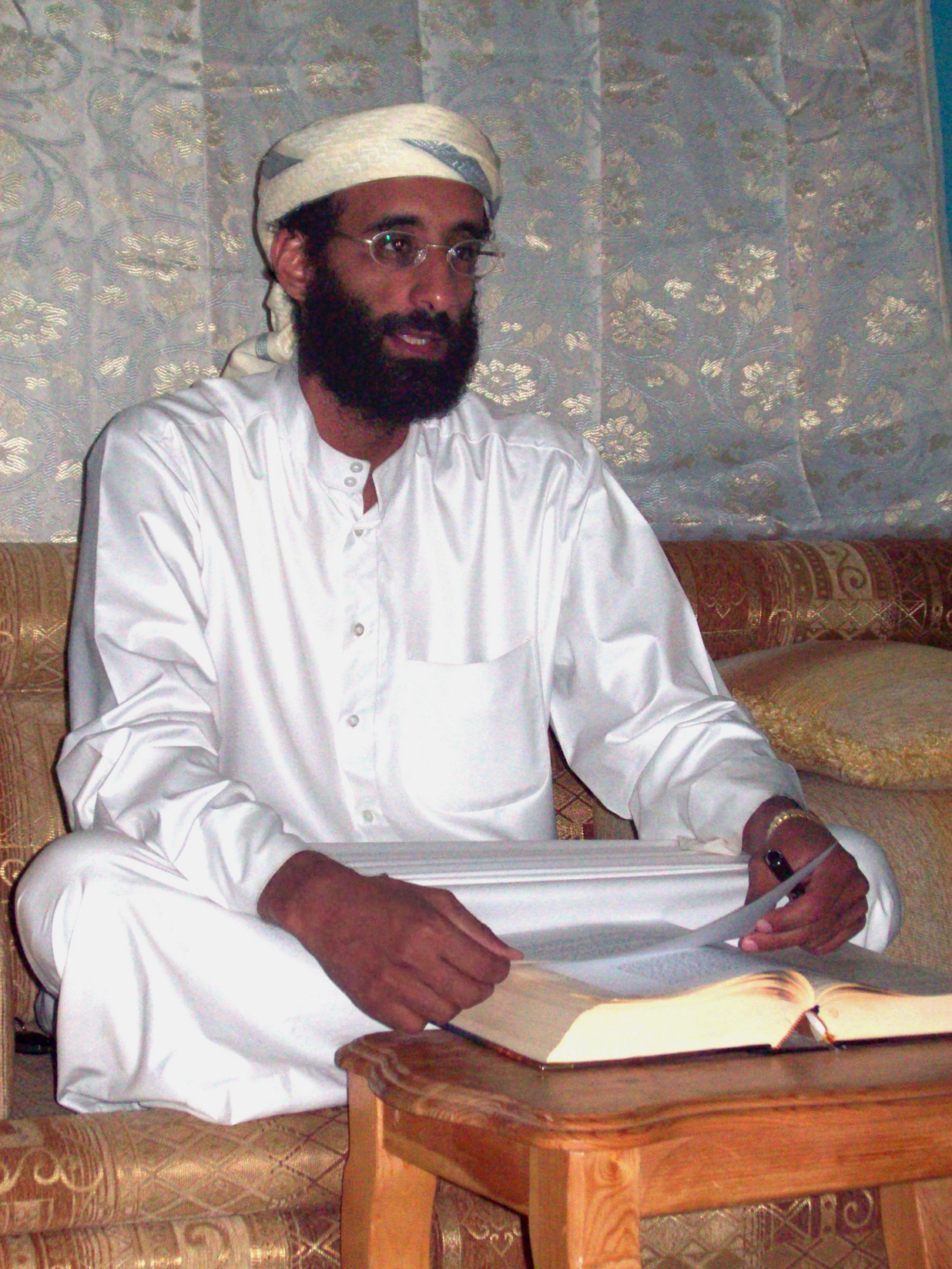
The potential killing of Anwar al-Awlaki was factored in the attack on Rafadh.

Several sources have claimed that an additional or even primary target of the strike was Anwar al-Awlaki. A radical Yemeni-American Islamic cleric, Awlaki attracted scrutiny after it was revealed he communicated via email with Nidal Hasan, a US Army officer who killed 13 people in a mass shooting at Fort Hood, Texas, on November 5, 2009. Authorities later determined that Awlaki did not have a significant role in the shooting.

Charlie Savage said claims of Awlaki having been targeted in the strike is false, as none of the involved officials who he interviewed recalled him being so. This notion was reportedly caused by a misunderstanding of the Obama administration's policy at the time regarding Awlaki. The elimination of Wuhayshi and Shihri was the objective, but with officials believing there was a reasonable chance that Awlaki could be present alongside them, they deemed it acceptable to launch the strike regardless as Awlaki's citizenship could not protect the legitimate targets around him. If Awlaki was killed, his death would be classified as that of an enemy combatant.

The strike on Rafadh was carried out by JSOC and executed by a US Navy vessel during the early hours of December 24. Hundreds living in the remote settlement were awoken by the blast. Five members of AQAP were killed as they slept in the targeted building, which was destroyed by the missiles. They were reportedly the same group of militants who gave a widely-publicized speech at a rally in al-Majalah days before. However, none of the targeted AQAP leaders were killed in the strike. It is unclear if Wuhayshi or Shihri had ever been to the building in the first place. Individuals in contact with Awlaki reported that he was not in the building or near the area at the time of the attack, nor was he affiliated with the individuals killed. According to Morten Storm, an undercover Danish spy in AQAP, Awlaki sent him a text message which read "Phew. Maaaaaan—that was close," after the attack.

== Response ==
Survivors and bystanders in al-Majalah collected the bodies of the victims which were intact and identifiable. These bodies were buried individually in a row along a highway leading to the village and marked with gravestones. Other victims, whose remains were intermingled and indistinguishable from each other, were buried in a mass grave, which also contained some animal remains for the same reason. Human Rights Watch reported that local authorities "failed to provide even the most basic rescue assistance such as transporting the wounded to hospitals, helping identify the dead and wounded, or securing the area". In Rafadh, a resident buried those killed before a tribal meeting was held, which resulted in the eviction of Quso and other militants from the settlement.

The strikes provoked outrage across Yemen, particularly among the tribes of Arhab and Abyan. Most Yemenis considered them a violation of the country's sovereignty, and local news reports described a massacre arising from them. Among those angered was Saleh bin Fareed, a sheikh of the Awaleq tribe who was one of the first people to reach al-Majalah. Expressing skepticism at initial news reports depicting an AQAP stronghold his tribe's territory, he embarked on a three-hour drive from Aden and veered three kilometers off the road to reach al-Majalah, contradicting official claims that it was inaccessibly remote. Upon arriving, he helped collect the remains of the victims and said he found no traces of a training camp. He also found a missile component which proved to him the US was responsible for the attack. Angered by descriptions of a successful strike on AQAP, Bin Fareed sought to publicly prove it was a massacre of civilians perpetrated by the US. He organized a gathering of nearly 150 sheikhs from across Yemen to lead a demonstration in solidarity for the victims and to protest the official account.

While planning the demonstration the day before, Bin Fareed was approached by a group of AQAP members who wanted to participate in the gathering. Bin Fareed rejected the group and vowed to have them killed if they did appear. The rally proceeded in al-Majalah on December 21 with thousands of participants, but the AQAP members arrived despite Bin Fareed's warning and gave a brief speech vowing war against the US but exculpating Yemeni soldiers, proclaiming their "issue is with the Americans and their lackeys." A video of the speech was broadcast by Al Jazeera and spread globally. Media focus was not concentrated on the rally's true intent but rather the speech, portraying it as a show of support for AQAP as Bin Fareed had feared.

=== Yemeni inquiry ===
Civilians killed in the al-Majalah strike
Haydara clan	Anbouri clan
Family of Mohammed Nasser Awad Jaljala: Mohammed Nasser Awad Jaljala, age 60; Nousa Mohammed Saleh El-Souwa, age 30; Nasser Mohammed Nasser, age 6; Arwa Mohammed Nasser, age 4; Fatima Mohammed Nasser, age 2	Family of Abdullah Mokbel Salem Louqye: Abdullah Mokbel Salem Louqye, age 37; Saleha Ali Ahmed Mansour, age 30; Ibrahim Abdullah Mokbel Salem Louqye, age 13; Asmaa Abdullah Mokbel Salem Louqye, age 9; Salma Abdullah Mokbel Salem Louqye, age 4; Fatima Abdullah Mokbel Salem Louqye, age 3
Family of Ali Mohammed Nasser Jaljala: Ali Mohammed Nasser, age 35; Qubla Al-Kharibi Salem, age 25; Afrah Ali Mohammed Nasser, age 9; Zayda Ali Mohammed Nasser, age 7; Hoda Ali Mohammed Nasser, age 5; Sheikha Ali Mohammed Nasser, age 4	Family of Ali Mokbel Salem Louqye: Ali Mokbel Salem Louqye, age 36; Hanaa Abdallah Monser, age 28; Moheile Mohammed Saeed Yaslem, age 30; Safaa Ali Mokbel Salem, age 25; Khadije Ali Mokbel Louqye, age 1; Hanaa Ali Mokbel Louqye, age 6; Mohammed Ali Mokbel Salem Louqye, age 4
Family Ahmed Mohammed Nasser Jaljala: Ahmed Mohammed Nasser Jaljala, age 30; Qubla Salem Nasser, age 21; Mouhsena Ahmed Adiyou, age 50	Family of Mokbel Salem Louqye: Fatima Yaslem Al-Rawami, age 67; Maryam Awad Nasser, age 43; Jawass Mokbel Salem Louqye, age 15
	Family of Abdullah Awad Sheikh Abdullah Awad Sheikh, age 65
Family of Hussein Abdullah Awad Sheikh: Hanane Mohammed Jadib, age 25; Maryam Hussein Abdullah Awad, age 29; Shafiq Hussein Abdullah Awad, age 15
Family of Nasser Mahdi Ahmad Bouh: Maryam Mokbel Salem Louqye, age 38; Sheikha Nasser Mahdi Ahmad Bouh, age 3
Family of Mohammed Saleh Mohammed Ali Al-Anbouri: Amina Abdullah Awad Sheikh, age 27; Maha Mohammed Saleh Mohammed, age 12; Soumaya Mohammed Saleh Mohammed, age 9; Shafika Mohammed Saleh Mohammed, age 4; Shafiq Mohammed Saleh Mohammed, age 2

Days after the strikes, Yemen's House of Representatives endorsed the opening of an inquiry into the al-Majalah operation, officially titled "Republic of Yemen, Special Parliamentarian Investigating Committee Report On Security Events In the Province of Abyan". A delegation of 15 members of parliament led by Himyar Abdullah al-Ahmar were sent to survey al-Majalah, interview locals, and gather eyewitness accounts. The panel's report was complete and published on February 7, 2010. It confirmed the militant and civilian death toll and provided a list of those killed.

Investigators found the entire area to be burnt and destroyed upon their arrival, along with multiple unexploded bomblets. The report stated "there were errors in the geographic coordinates and the determination of the location" for the strike. It upheld that Kazemi was an AQAP commander, and had transferred money to at least 20 foreign militants in Yemen, but also reported he had been moving freely in the region and in areas with multiple security checkpoints, making it possible for him to have been captured or eliminated by other means. The House of Representatives approved the commission's findings in March 2010, and demanded that a judicial investigation be opened into the bombing to identify those responsible. It also issued an official apology to the victims of the attack, labeling it a mistake and promising financial compensation.

=== Unexploded ordnance ===
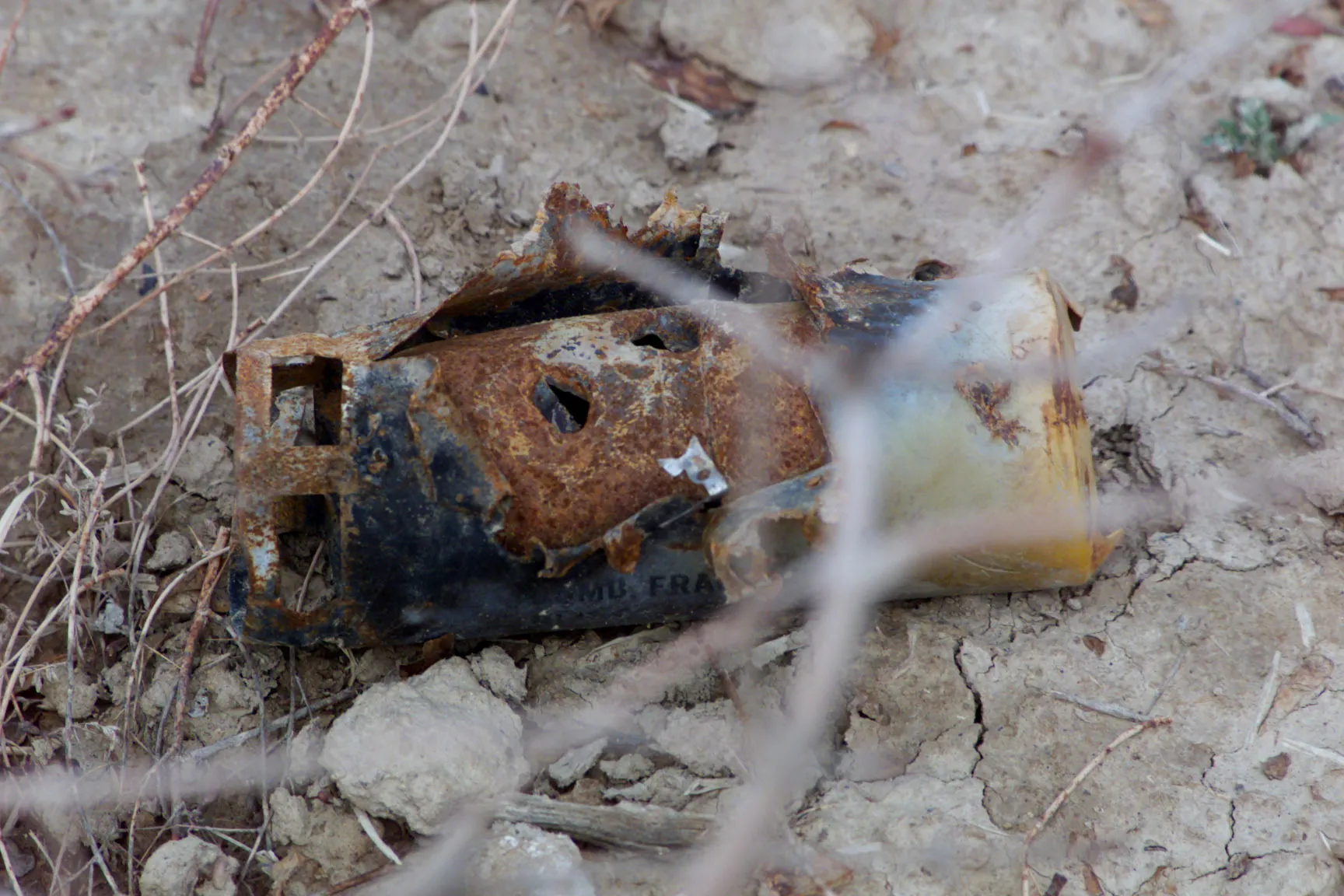
Unexploded BLU-97 submunitions in al-Majalah killed at least four people after the initial attack.

The cluster bomblets in al-Majalah which did not explode during the strike were embedded within the terrain, forming an effective minefield of unexploded ordnance. The munitions were spread around the area in a 1.5 kilometer radius. At least four people died after the initial strikes due to the munitions. Two people were killed during the December 21 rally. Another was killed later that day while attempting to remove a bomblet from their car which they had collected earlier. The area was cordoned off by residents afterwards. On January 24, 2012, a child brought a bomblet to his home and it exploded, injuring him and his brother and killing his father.

The Yemeni government offered to clear al-Majalah of remaining explosives. This was rejected by the locals, who instead wanted assistance from an international organization out of fear that authorities would not sufficiently clear the area or would use the opportunity to cover up their responsibility for the strike. By 2013, al-Majalah remained abandoned and uninhabitable due to the unexploded bomblets.

A similar scene took place in Rafadh, where many residents were forced to move away from the bomb site because of damage inflicted to their nearby homes and lingering cluster munitions. With no government assistance, some had dealt with the bomblets by shooting and intentionally detonating them to clear the area.

=== Compensation ===
According to a leaked diplomatic cable, the Yemeni government originally allocated around $100,000 in total to the governor of Abyan to split between the families of the al-Majalah victims. The government later offered to increase the money to 5.5 million rials, approximately $25,000 per killed civilian, and added 10 Toyota Hiluxes as a down payment, but the families instead wanted 10 million rials, approximately $51,000, and a pledge to hold the perpetrators responsible. The government refused to negotiate. Some families began accepting compensation plans for property damage by mid-2013. A total of 37 million rials (around $170,000) was divided between 10 families, averaging $17,000 each. The sum covered the civilians killed and loss of assets such as livestock, but not destroyed houses. On October 22, 2013, the Yemeni embassy in Washington, D.C., declared that all the families had been compensated.

== Responsibility ==
Officials from the US and Yemen agreed to portray the strikes as the latter's own doing to maintain the secrecy of US intervention. Due to popular anti-American sentiment within Yemen, particularly among religious groups and tribes, openly acknowledging it may have damaged the Yemeni government's reputation and generated sympathy for AQAP.

Barack Obama called Ali Abdullah Saleh to attribute the strikes to the Yemeni government

After the strikes on al-Majalah and Arhab, the Yemeni government said their military carried out pre-emptive ground raids and airstrikes against AQAP which had killed 34 militants and captured 17. The Yemeni Air Force flew MiG-29's over al-Majalah to portray it as their own operation. The Pentagon directed all inquiries to Yemen. Media reports wrote of Obama having called Saleh to voice his support for the "Yemeni" operations, as did Egyptian president Hosni Mubarak. Yemen later claimed it launched an airstrike on Rafadh where the AQAP leaders were presumably located and killed some 30 militants, which was proven to be false.

Despite the scheme, most Yemenis had presumed American culpability from the start, and local discontent was directed against the US as well as the Yemeni government. American officials had spoken anonymously to news agencies just after the first strikes contradicting the story. The New York Times reported that "American firepower" was involved, while ABC News was the first outlet to confirm the US had fired the missiles. Al Jazeera broadcast footage of munition remnants in al-Majalah and theorized US involvement. Facing scrutiny from parliament, interior minister Rashad al-Alimi revised the narrative by claiming the US and Saudi Arabia had contributed with intelligence, but that the operations were still conducted by Yemen. The state-ran Saba News Agency published a report in January 2010 which acknowledged civilians deaths in al-Majalah but said they were accommodating militants, and portrayed unexploded cluster munitions as mines planted by AQAP in an attempt to prevent investigators from visiting.

Sebastian Gorka, an instructor at the Joint Special Operations University involved in training Yemeni forces, publicly verified the true nature of the operations. CNN reported in September 2010 that foreign minister Abu Bakr al-Qirbi was the first Yemeni official to admit the US was responsible for the strikes, having done so in an interview with Arabic newspaper Al-Hayat. Qirbi said no further strikes were permitted because the government "ascertained they weren't achieving results." In an October interview with CNN, Central Security Forces chief Yahya Saleh also confirmed American responsibility, but the US government continued to maintain secrecy.

=== Investigations ===
==== Abdulelah Haider Shaye ====
Independent Yemeni journalist Abdulelah Haider Shaye was the first to "file authoritative reports on the US role in al-Majalah" according to Human Rights Watch. Hearing of the strikes soon after they took place, he traveled to al-Majalah and quickly determined the US was responsible. He provided several media outlets, including Al Jazeera, with descriptions of the death toll as well as photographs depicting the munition remnants, some of which bore the inscription "Made in the USA". Shaye's work, utilized by American news agencies and human rights organizations, contributed towards the refuting of the official explanation of the attacks.

Shaye continued to report on al-Majalah and other US operations in Yemen throughout 2010. In July, he was kidnapped and threatened by Yemeni intelligence agents, who warned him not to further discuss the attacks. After describing his detention in an Al Jazeera interview, he was arrested by the CTU on August 16 and kept in solitary confinement for over a month. A Yemeni court indicted him on charges of supporting AQAP in September. He was convicted in January 2011 and sentenced to five years in prison, but was pardoned by Saleh weeks later due to tribal pressure. He was imprisoned again in February after Obama had called Saleh to voice concern over his release. On July 23, 2013, Shaye was released from prison and permitted to serve the rest of his term under house arrest through a decision by Saleh's successor, President Abdrabbuh Mansour Hadi.

==== Amnesty International ====
Amnesty International released a report on June 7, 2010, containing several photographs of American bomb and missile remnants in al-Majalah. The photos, obtained by the group in March, showed various damaged components of a BGM-109D Tomahawk as well as an unexploded BLU-97A/B submunition traced to the Kansas Army Ammunition Plant. The report noted the type of missile used was only known to be in the US military's arsenal and not in Yemen's. Regional deputy director Phillip Lewis viewed the lack of any attempt to capture the militants before launching the strike as "at the very least unlawful", and the civilian casualties on top of it "grossly irresponsible, particularly given the likely use of cluster munitions". Yemeni officials rejected the report, and Pentagon officials declined to comment on it. American media "paid scant attention" according to Michael Isikoff.

=== Cables leak ===
On November 28, 2010, WikiLeaks began distributing and publishing collections of classified US government cables. Among them were several cables pertaining to the strikes, which remained unacknowledged by the US. A cable dated to December 21, 2009, recorded ambassador Seche's concern with the perceived indifference of the Yemeni government towards media reports on the strikes, which disclosed the high civilian casualties and American involvement. Interior minister Alimi told him "any evidence of greater US involvement such as fragments of US munitions found at the sites—could be explained away as equipment purchased from the US." Saleh voiced eagerness for continued operations, with Alimi declaring that Yemen "'must maintain the status quo' with regard to the official denial of US involvement in order to ensure additional 'positive operations' against AQAP".

We'll continue saying the bombs are ours, not yours.

— Ali Abdullah Saleh, diplomatic cable released by WikiLeaks

Another cable described a meeting in Sanaa between Saleh, Alimi, and Petraeus on January 2, 2010. While discussing the strikes, Saleh lamented civilian casualties in al-Majalah, but Petraeus claimed the only civilians who died were Kazemi's wife and two children. Saleh proceeded to engage in a "lengthy and confusing aside" with other Yemeni officials at the meeting regarding the death count. The writer commented that "Saleh's conversation... suggests he has not been well briefed by his advisors on the strike in Abyan", but several investigations into the civilian death toll of the strike suggest that Petraeus may have been the one who was ill-informed. Gregory D. Johnsen claims the misunderstanding was partly the result of a new policy within the US government which classified all military-age males as combatants unless proven otherwise. Later in the meeting, Saleh denied authorization for US ground operations in the country, but granted permission for usage of fixed-wing aircraft and precision-guided munitions in further strikes. Saleh told Petraeus: "We'll continue saying the bombs are ours, not yours". Alimi then joked that he had lied to parliament when he spoke about the nature of the strikes. The leaks effectively confirmed the long-assumed US responsibility for the strikes.

== Aftermath ==
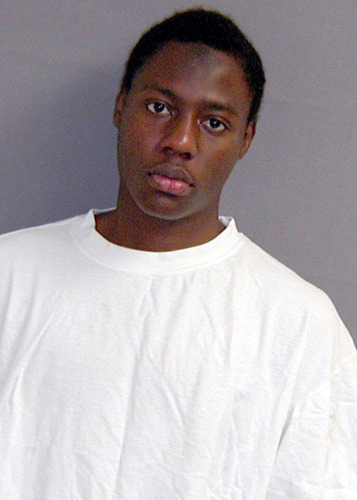
Suicide bomber Umar Farouk Abdulmutallab had boarded his flight amidst the strikes.

The strikes did not impede AQAP's plan to have Nigerian suicide bomber Umar Farouk Abdulmutallab board Northwest Airlines Flight 253, an American passenger jet bound to Detroit, Michigan. Abdulmutallab spent months travelling through several countries after receiving the bomb in Yemen, and had boarded the flight in Amsterdam, Netherlands, by the time the strike on Rafadh took place. He did not manage to bring down the plane on December 25, 2009, only because the explosives hidden in his underwear failed to properly detonate before he was subdued and arrested. AQAP claimed responsibility for the plot on December 28, citing the deaths of women and children in the strikes as justification.

The bombing attempt "clear[ed] up what the intelligence concerning an imminent al-Qaeda in the Arabian Peninsula attack had been about" according to Savage. Prior to then, the intelligence community was exclusively focused on AQAP's potential to attack locally and did not realize their operational capacity had reached the level of directing plots against the US homeland. Obama did not mention the strikes when addressing the attempted bombing to honor the secret agreement with Yemen. Republicans lambasted Obama and his administration for downplating the threat from terrorists, despite the fact that preemptive strikes were ordered against said terrorists unbeknownst to them.

Yemen and AQAP received intense media and political attention from the West in the plot's aftermath. Within national security circles, AQAP surpassed al-Qaeda in Afghanistan and Pakistan as the greatest threat to the US, and counterterrorism priorities shifted to Yemen. Further military action was pursued by JSOC throughout 2010 in both unilateral and bilateral operations with Yemen. Saleh gave further leeway to the US and agreed to falsely claim more operations. The Obama administration publicly proclaimed the US was not militarily involved in Yemen and was strictly providing support the Yemeni government's fight against AQAP. Cruise missiles were phased out by JSOC in place for fighter jets which better complimented targeted killings. Sporadic airstrikes took place until May 24, 2010, when an airstrike accidentally killed the deputy governor of Marib, turning the local tribes hostile to the Yemeni government. Frustrated with the performance of JSOC, Obama suspended operations in Yemen for the remainder of the year.

== Assessment ==
Anyone who studied the asymmetric battle against terrorism recognized the crucial role played by perceptions of fairness and injustice, good intentions and bad, competent allies and blunderers. But the campaign had begun with clumsy cover-ups of American involvement, cruise missiles and cluster bombs utterly unsuited for precise strikes, and collateral damage so extreme that it would permanently poison public opinion. With a single strike, the United States had yielded the moral high ground in Yemen.

— Scott Shane, Objective Troy: A Terrorist, a President, and the Rise of the Drone

The strike on al-Majalah may have been initially considered a success internally due to the elimination of Kazemi and his men. However, those comprising the main leadership of AQAP, such as Wuhayshi and Shihri, had survived. This dampered the effectiveness of the operations according to Edmund Hull, a former US ambassador to Yemen. Journalist Theo Padnos similarly questioned whether the strikes achieved any strategic objectives.

Moreover, the heavy civilian casualties in al-Majalah led to the operations being labeled a "tactical and strategic failure" and a "resonant catastrophe", one American official calling it "a terrible outcome". Intelligence failure and inappropriate munition selection were considered the cause of mistake. Commentators noted that cruise missiles loaded with cluster munitions were innately inaccurate and unfit for a precise targeted killing operation, and required elaborate intelligence in advance in order to be used effectively. Savage raised questions as to whether the strike could be considered a war crime and if the civilians deaths were 'reasonable' in terms of targeting law and collateral damage. According to a presidential aide, an after action report verified the casualties weeks afterwards to Obama's dismay, and they subsequently "went through a very long process led by Brennan to tighten up how we take lethal action in Yemen." The CIA cited the strike in its proposal for the usage of drones for further strikes in Yemen after 2010. Al-Majalah remained the deadliest strike by US forces in Yemen until 2025 in a separate military operation against the Houthis.

The strike on al-Majalah ended up being exploited by AQAP as a propaganda and recruitment coup, to the point that Awlaki told a confidant shortly afterwards that "the Americans just scored a big own goal." For years AQAP had sought to portray Yemen as a legitimate theatre for jihadists similar to how Iraq and Afghanistan were viewed, and direct US intervention strengthened this narrative according to Johnsen. Having quickly assumed American responsibility, imagery of civilians casualties, particularly that of children, was employed by AQAP to appeal to tribesmen in calling for war against the US. Nearly all AQAP statements claiming responsibility for attacks throughout 2010 mentioned taking revenge for al-Majalah. The revelation of a cover-up agreement further benefited AQAP and solidified their narrative regarding Yemen's government.

A Yemeni official acknowledged that US intervention generated sympathy for AQAP among the public. Johnsen said the civilian casualties fermented violent extremism in Yemen similar to its impact in Iraq and Afghanistan. Many local tribesmen who had lost relatives and friends in the strike ended up joining AQAP as a chance to enact revenge. This contributed to the exponential estimated growth of the group's size from 300 members at the time of the strikes to above 1,000 members by 2012. A presidential aide told Scott Shane the US was "aware of the blowback on the ground and how off things had gotten". Factoring in unfit missile selection, civilian deaths, and the exposed cover-up, Shane argued "the United States had yielded the moral high ground in Yemen" with the strike on al-Majalah and permanently damaged public opinion regarding continued intervention against AQAP.

== See also ==
- March–May 2025 United States attacks in Yemen
