= Ahmed al-Maisari =

Yemeni politician

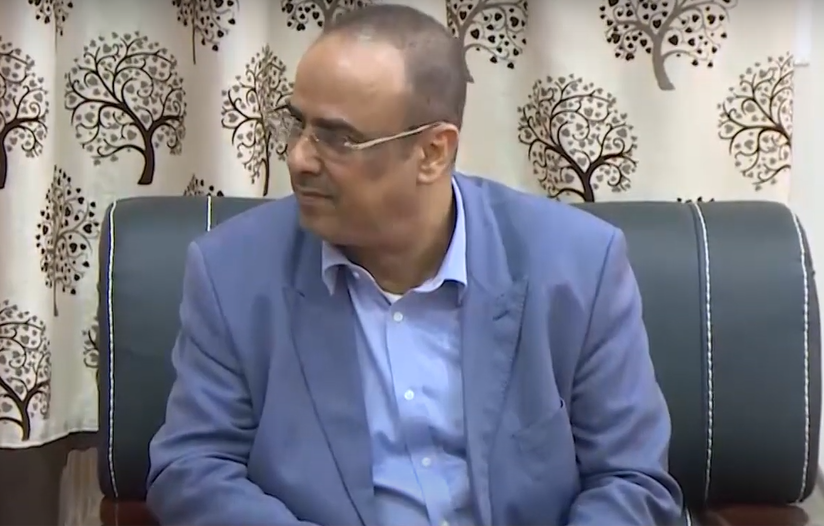

Interior Minister
- In office 25 December 2017 – 18 December 2020
- President: Abdrabbuh Mansur Hadi
- Preceded by: Hussein Arab
- Succeeded by: Ibrahim Haidan

Deputy Prime Minister of Yemen
- In office 25 December 2017 – 18 December 2020
- President: Abdrabbuh Mansur Hadi

Minister of Agriculture and Irrigation
- In office 1 October 2015 – 25 December 2017
- President: Abdrabbuh Mansur Hadi

Personal details
- Born: Abyan Governorate
- Party: General People's Congress

Ahmed Ahmed al-Maisari (Arabic: أحمد بن أحمد الميسري) is a Yemeni politician. He is the former Interior Minister of the Yemeni internationally recognized government (24 December 2017 – 18 December 2020).

He served also as deputy Prime Minister of Yemen. On 21 August 2015, al-Maisari was appointed by Yemeni president Abdrabbuh Mansur Hadi as minister of Agriculture and Irrigation.
