= 2010 Wadi Abidah airstrike =

United States airstrike in Yemen

- Part of United States intervention in Yemen
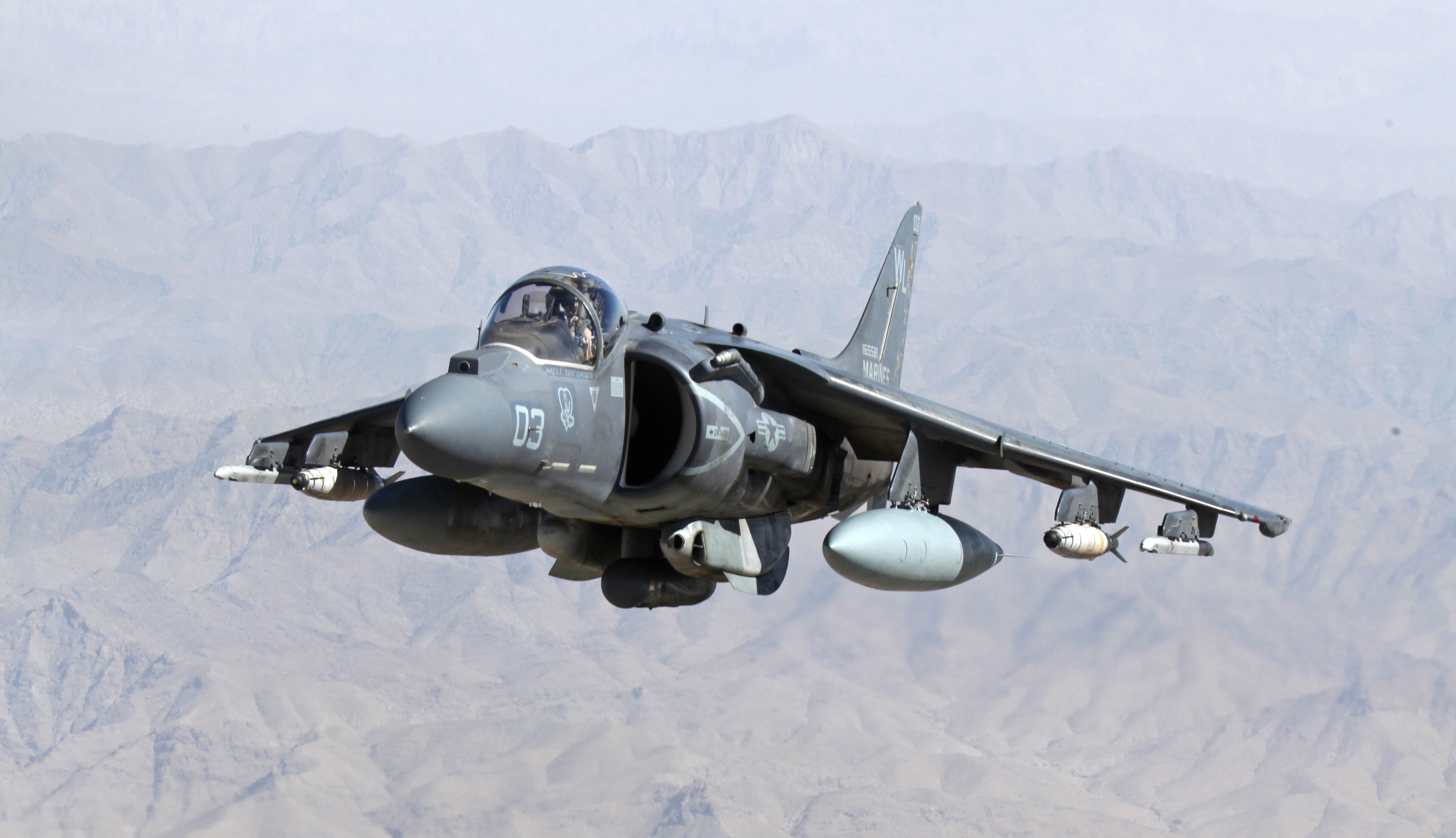
- A Harrier jump jet, the type of aircraft used in the strike
- Type: Airstrike; targeted killing
- Location: Wadi Abidah, Marib Governorate, Yemen
- Planned by: United States; Yemen
- Target: al-Qaeda in the Arabian Peninsula
- Date: May 24, 2010; 16 years ago c. 8:00 p.m. (UTC+3)
- Executed by: United States Armed Forces; Joint Special Operations Command
- Outcome: Failure: Marib deputy governor Jaber al-Shabwani killed; Local tribes launch attacks on oil facilities and other infrastructure; US operations in Yemen halted until 2011
- Casualties: 3–4 killed (including Shabwani); 1–2 injured

On May 24, 2010, an airstrike conducted by Joint Special Operations Command (JSOC) in the desert of Wadi Abidah killed three to four people, including Jaber al-Shabwani, the deputy governor of Marib Governorate, Yemen. Shabwani was a popular local leader and was attending a meeting to persuade a group of local militants to leave al-Qaeda in the Arabian Peninsula (AQAP). Yemeni intelligence services, whom the United States Armed Forces was relying on to conduct strikes in the country, informed JSOC of an imminent meeting of AQAP members set to take place in Marib.

The killing of Shabwani provoked his tribe, which began attacking state targets and infrastructure in Marib including the Marib–Ras Isa oil pipeline. Yemeni president Ali Abdullah Saleh compensated Shabwani's tribe and announced an inquiry into the strike, though his government was silent ever since. The Shabwan restarted attacks on the pipeline and other energy infrastructure during the Yemeni revolution and continued through the next several years, costing the government an estimated $1 to $4 billion.

The botched airstrike tarnished the reputation of the Yemeni government in Marib and provided AQAP an easier opening to the local tribes. Frustrated with the performance of JSOC, American president Barack Obama suspended the military campaign in Yemen for the rest of the year. US military leaders later suspected the Yemeni government had intentionally facilitated the killing of Shabwani through providing faulty intelligence in order to eliminate a political rival of Saleh.

== Background ==
The United States began pursuing covert military intervention in Yemen against al-Qaeda in the Arabian Peninsula (AQAP) in 2009. Led by Joint Special Operations Command (JSOC), the campaign involved targeted killings operations initially utilizing cruise missiles, but extensive civilian casualties in the inaugural strike against a militant training camp in al-Majalah on December 17, 2009, led to the military shifting to other methods of attack. Because armed drones could not be flown in the region, JSOC decided upon the usage of manned fighter jets to conduct further airstrikes.

JSOC did not have an extensive human intelligence network in the country to verify targets, instead relying on Yemeni ground intelligence to feed them information. After the 2009 strikes, the next US operation took place on March 14, 2010. It proved more successful than previous attacks, killing two militants including AQAP commander Jamil al-Anbari.

=== Jaber al-Shabwani ===
Shabwani in an undated photograph

Jaber al-Shabwani (Note: Arabic: جابر الشبواني; also transliterated as Jabir and Jabr.) (c. 1985 or 1986 – May 24, 2010) was the deputy governor of Marib. He was an prominent local figure from the Abidah tribe and Shabwan clan. His clan was a longtime ally of President Ali Abdullah Saleh, having supported his government during the Yemeni civil war of 1994 and backing the ruling General People's Congress from thereon. Shabwani was the son of Ali al-Shabwani, sheikh of the Shabwan clan and an influential tribal leader and GPC member.

Saleh appointed Shabwani as deputy governor in 2010. Local activists characterized him as a popular figure across Marib and cooperative with the federal government in regards to the war on terror by acting as a mediator in talks with AQAP members. Jaber was a distant cousin of Ayad al-Shabwani, a local AQAP commander involved in clashes with security forces in 2009 and targeted in two unsuccessful airstrikes in Marib in January 2010. Relatives and local leaders maintained that Jaber was not an ally of AQAP despite the familial connection. Many Yemeni officials were known to use said connections as pathways for contact with the group.

== Prelude ==
The operation originated from a tip by Yemeni intelligence services, which had delivered a report to the US military detailing an AQAP leadership gathering set to take place in Marib. This was followed by weeks of reconnaissance flights by American surveillance drones which had reportedly tracked down Ayad al-Shawbani. Citing US officials, journalist Scott Shane claimed the operation had materialized amidst increased internal pressure on JSOC to eliminate Yemeni-American jihadist cleric Anwar al-Awlaki after AQAP published an interview with him on May 22, 2010.

Working with the information at hand, US government and military officials as well as the ambassador to Yemen authorized an airstrike on the purported gathering. Just before it took place, General James Cartwright, the vice chairman of the Joint Chiefs of Staff, briefed President Barack Obama of a high-value target in Yemen which JSOC had acquired and was prepared to attack. Obama granted his approval for the operation.

== Airstrike ==
The strike took place in Marib Governorate.

On May 24, 2010, Shabwani arranged a meeting with Mohammed bin Saeed bin Jameel, (Note: Also known by the last name Jaradan.) fellow Abidah tribesman and brother of Ali bin Saeed bin Jameel, believed to be the emir of AQAP in Marib. The purpose of the meeting was to persuade local AQAP militants to either surrender themselves to authorities or leave Abidah tribal territory. Shabwani was looking towards negotiations for the surrender of Jameel's brother. According to Alkarama, several members of AQAP were set to attend the meeting, including Shabwani's cousin Ayad.

Later in the day, Shabwani and Jameel arrived at the meeting point in a remote desert area of Wadi Abidah, each with an entourage of bodyguards. The exact location is unknown but has been estimated to be within the northern part of the village of al-Rashid Manif bordering the uzlah of al-Quza. It was reportedly near an orange grove on a farm belonging to Ayad.

At around 8:00 p.m. local time, minutes after Shabwani and Jameel had arrived at the location, a Harrier jump jet launched an airstrike on the meeting. Both Shabwani and Jameel's vehicles were hit. Differing sources have claimed that either Jameel or Ayad were the intended target of the strike. Shane claimed a walkie-talkie linked to Awlaki was pinpointed to a vehicle at the gathering, but believed JSOC hadn't considered that the device was likely used by multiple other people than Awlaki. Shabwani was most likely not a target.

Contradictory reports state that three or four people were killed in the strike, including Shabwani and two bodyguards accompanying him. Some sources describe the death of Shabwani's uncle Fahd, though others claim that he was among the two injured in the strike, who were flown to Egypt to receive medical treatment. Jaradan survived the airstrike unharmed, and arrived at his native village the next day.

== Response ==
News of the airstrike spread throughout the country within hours. Despite no official confirmation most Yemenis had predicted the US was responsible for it. The Abidah tribe considered Shabwani's killing an assassination against one of their most prominent members, while the Shabwan clan was particularly infuriated because it was the third recent military operation targeting one of their members. Abidah and Shabwani tribesmen began attacking infrastructure, government institutions and military facilities across Marib in response. The critical Marib–Ras Isa oil pipeline was attacked twice in quick succession, cutting off energy to numerous areas including the capital Sanaa, while the highway leading to it from Marib was blockaded. In Marib city, tribal gunmen fired at government buildings and the Republican Palace, sparking clashes with security forces. The local air defense installation was also attacked.

Likely fearing significant losses to the nation's energy sector from the attacks, Yemen's Supreme Security Committee issued an apology for the airstrike as President Saleh ordered the formation of a panel to conduct an inquiry on May 25. Mediations between tribal and government representatives led to a truce being announced the next day. Further hostilities were avoided as the government sent a compensation package including 200 machine guns, a replacement land cruiser, and 5 million rials (approximately USD $22,830), as repair crews were permitted to access the pipeline. Ali al-Shabwani apologized for the attacks and agreed to a personal meeting with Saleh and participation in a tribal mediation process. Yemeni officials told an arbitration committee they had no knowledge of the airstrike, indirectly placing the blame on the US. The government agreed to pay approximately 1 billion riyals ($4.5 million) in blood money to avoid a larger fallout.

Despite public assurances from foreign minister Abu Bakr al-Qirbi that the investigation into the airstrike would continue, no further results were reported from the government. Frustrated by the lack of action, Ali al-Shabwani took advantage of the Yemeni revolution to defect to the opposition and resume his campaign against the government. Shabwani tribesmen bombed the pipeline once again in March 2011, attacked power stations, and cut off the road to Sanaa to block fuel transports. Ali demanded $5 million in blood money and a personal explanation for the airstrike from US ambassador Gerald M. Feierstein before the pipeline could be repaired.

An estimate in June 2011 reported that the total cost of the pipeline shutdown being over $1 billion, and was continuing to rise. Attacks continued throughout the next years and were increasingly utilized by other tribes as well as AQAP as a pressure tactic, ultimately costing the government over $4 billion. Journalist Mohammed al-Abbsi pinpointed the killing of Shabwani and the subsequent attacks as the root cause for the near-daily power outages occurring in Sanaa by 2014. The frequent attacks were cited by the Houthis as justification for their invasion of Marib during the Yemeni civil war.

== Aftermath ==
=== Impact ===
"[Shabwani's death] marked the point where the situation really started to deteriorate...This was someone liked and respected by all of Marib; someone who resolved problems and helped maintain order. After the strike, everything was affected... and it still hasn't really improved."

— Nasser Muhtam, head of a local NGO

According to British journalist and Middle East specialist Patrick Seale, the killing of Shabwani "sent shock waves through the Saleh regime, undermining its legitimacy in the eyes of the tribes and the public at large." Yemeni political analyst Abdul Ghani al-Iryani said that, in conjunction with the civilian casualties from operations in 2009, the airstrike "had a devastating impact" on the government's credibility. The situation was exploited heavily by AQAP, with the group's propaganda sources deriding Shabwani as an infidel while portraying the airstrike as an aggression on the tribes of eastern Yemen.

As a result of the airstrike the tribes of Marib were alienated from the government for multiple years. Many tribes began avoiding counterterrorism cooperation with the government and the US. Support for AQAP also grew among certain tribesmen in the region. Shadi Hamid of the Brookings Institution noted the already worsening relations between the tribes and the government prior to the airstrike along with AQAP's ability to attract local appeal as factors leading to an increase in support for AQAP.

Most locals in Marib interviewed by the Combating Terrorism Center believed Shabwani's killing to be "a sign of malign intent or incompetence." It further states that it "did not encourage confidence in Sanaa's or Washington's ability to protect the few remaining tribal leaders willing to work with either government." Although in the following years most airstrikes in Marib did not lead to civilian casualties, the killing of Shabwani nonetheless led to a rise in fear and paranoia among many in the general populace who feared they could be mistakenly targeted or killed.

=== Assessment ===
JSOC had only learned that Shabwani was killed in the strike once the retaliatory attacks had started. US officials said they did not know Shabwani was involved in mediations prior to the strike. The military was unable to send investigators to Yemen to probe the incident, and the Yemeni government did not conduct an investigation despite requests from the US. The New York Times writes: "The most widely accepted explanation is that Yemeni and American officials failed to fully communicate before the attack." Some American officials went on to defend the death of Shabwani regardless of it being unintentional due to his association with AQAP.

Soon after the news of Shabwani's death came out, national security advisor John Brennan expressed frustration, ordering the military to review any mistakes made during the operation so they "could take corrective actions and deal with the fallout appropriately". Obama was similarly angered after being briefed on the matter by Brennan, demanding an explanation from Cartwright in what the latter called "a pretty good chest thumping from the commander-in-chief." Later meetings between top officials in the National Security Council highlighted the strike as a display of JSOC's struggling intelligence network and target-vetting procedures in Yemen.

Saleh reportedly expressed discontent to American officials regarding the strike, although he did not order an end to the US operations. But this, along with Obama's increased concern with the effectiveness of JSOC among other factors, led to the military campaign in Yemen being suspended for the remainder of the year. This hiatus was utilized by JSOC and the Central Intelligence Agency to bolster US intelligence networks in the country. Military operations eventually resumed in May 2011 with the added usage of unmanned aerial vehicles.

=== Yemeni misinformation allegations ===
In December 2011, an article published by The Wall Street Journal revealed that several high-ranking figures from the US military believed they had intentionally been given faulty information by Yemeni intelligence services which led to the killing of Shabwani. An official found that the intelligence report which prompted the strike was suspicious, as it was extensive in all regards except for the fact that it didn't note Shabwani's presence at the meeting. Furthermore, they also described the presence of a Yemeni intelligence officer at the scene of the airstrike, who, according to the US, had died, but according to Shabwani's family had lived.

While Yemeni officials claimed that Shabwani had gone on his own accord, Shabwani's father stated that he had been tasked to do so on the orders of the government. Immediately prior to then, Shabwani had come into conflict with key official figures in the family of President Saleh as he attempted to secure more funds for basic services in Marib. According to political analyst Abdul Ghani al-Iryani, this had also included a "commercial dispute" with the chief of the National Security Bureau, a government intelligence organization. This view was corroborated by Ibrahim Mothana, co-founder of the Watan Party.

== See also ==
- 2002 Marib airstrike
