= Abdul Qader Qahtan =

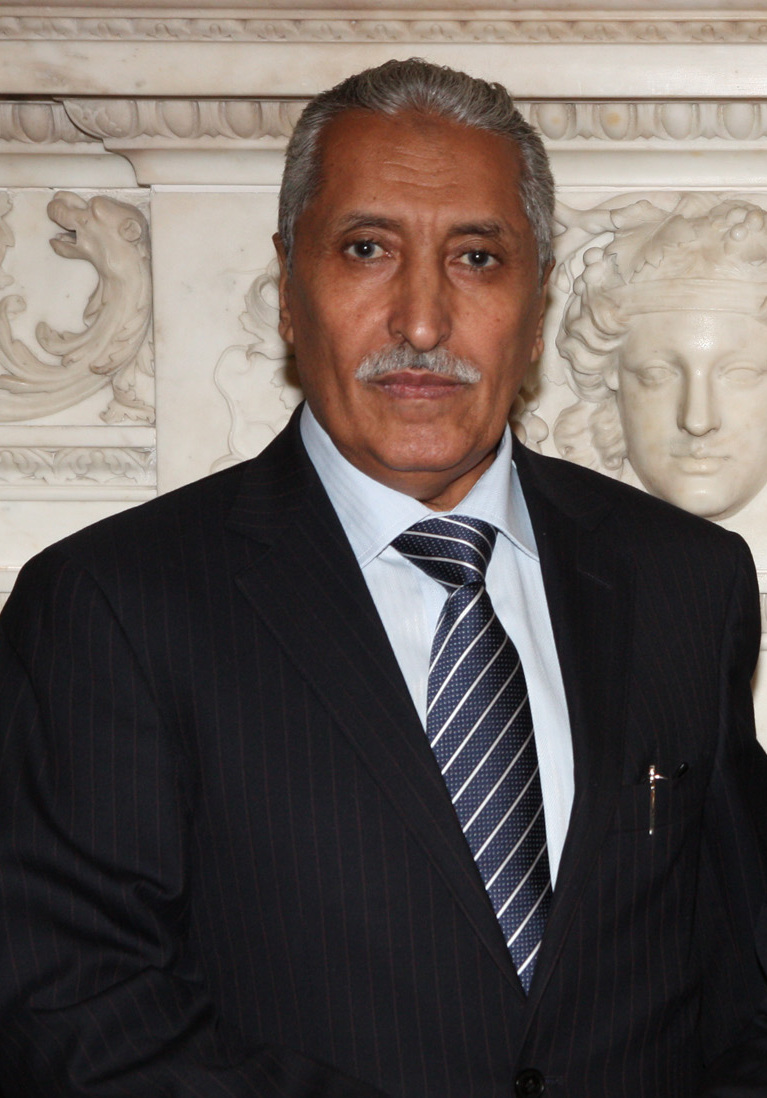
- Qahtan in 2013

Interior Minister
- In office 7 December 2011 – 7 March 2014
- President: Abd Rabbuh Mansur Hadi
- Prime Minister: Muhammad Salim Basindwah
- Preceded by: Rashad al-Alimi
- Succeeded by: Jalal al-Rawishan

Personal details
- Born: 13 December 1952 (age 73) Taiz, Yemen
- Party: Independent politician
- Education: Ain Shams University

Military service
- Rank: Major General

Abdul Qader Qahtan (born 13 December 1952) is a Yemeni jurist, security officer and politician. He served as interior minister from December 2011 to March 2014.

== Early life and education ==
Qahtan was born in Taiz on 13 December 1952. He graduated from Yemeni Police College in 1976. Then he received a law degree in Sanaa in 1980. He also obtained a master's degree in law from Ain Shams University in Egypt in 1983. In addition, he holds a PhD in public law, which he received again from Ain Shams University in 1991.

== Career ==
Qahtan was a faculty member at Sanaa University from 1992 to 2011. He is also a career security officer with the rank of major general. He served as security manager of Taiz from 1992 to 1996. He was also Interpol commander in Sanaa. He later joined the Islah Party. He was appointed interior minister on 10 December 2011 to the cabinet led by prime minister Mohammad Salim Basindwah. He is one of the opposition group members in the cabinet.
