= Rafadh =

Remote settlement in Yemen

Rafadh رفض
- Village
- Location in Yemen
- Coordinates: 14°11′06.2″N 46°56′53.6″E
- Country: Yemen
- Governorate: Shabwah Governorate
- District: As Said district

Population (2010)
  - Total: Hundreds
- Time zone: UTC+3

Wadi Rafadh, (Note: Arabic: وادي رفض, romanized: Valley of Rejection) also referred to simply as Rafadh, (Note: Arabic: رفض, romanized: Rejection) is a valley in Shabwah, Yemen.

== Overview ==
Rafadh is located in the As Said district of Shabwah, around 50 miles out from the provincial capital of Ataq. The New York Times described it as "one of the most remote and inaccessible valleys on earth", consisting of an arid landscape dominated by dry mountains with winding pathways which are traversed by the locals. Rugged settlements lie along the two sides of the wadi which splits the area. A few hundred people, all of them well-armed as in Yemeni tradition, were estimated to have been living in Rafadh, primarily members of the Awaliq tribe. Agriculture is prevalent among the residents, with Vice describing the settlement in its entirety as a "collection of farms" and an "arid landscape dotted with lemon orchards and cornfields". Government services or presence was effectively non-existent in Rafadh as of 2010. There were no paved roads, no electricity, no public water supply, and no education system. The lack of basic public services has created a sense of animosity among the locals towards the central government.

== History ==
The name Rafadh is derived from the Arabic word for "rejection", reflecting the dissatisfaction of the residents with the government. Rafadh had once been of relevance due to its positioning along a passage linking Aden to Shabwah and areas further east. Upon the construction of a new highway to replace the road in the 1970s, the settlement became isolated and neglected by the central government, resulting in most of its inhabitants leaving for more urban areas. In 2006, local tribesmen had resorted to kidnapping and holding people ransom to acquire more assistance from the government, though this had not achieved

Despite historic feuds between the resident families, Rafadh experienced a period of relative peace under the socialist governance of South Yemen. This had ended after the formation of unified Yemen in 1990 under President Ali Abdullah Saleh, who encouraged tribalism. A deadly blood feud broke out in the settlement from 2006 to 2007, stemming from the shooting of two men at their market stall and escalating further due to government inaction.

=== Al-Qaeda activity ===
The tribesmen of Rafadh welcomed the arrival of Fahd al-Quso, a member of the local al-Qaeda network of Yemen, in 2007, on the grounds that his grandfather had a house in the area and that he was wanted by the government due to his association with al-Qaeda, gaining him the respect of the tribes. Furthermore, Quso promised to bring in teachers to have allocated to the local school, which had been abandoned and out of service for years. A previous deal negotiated with the government stipulated an offer of six teachers, whereas Quso had brought in 16. By mid-2009, many outsiders, believed to be members of al-Qaeda in the Arabian Peninsula (AQAP), were passing through Quso's residence.

Quso's home was targeted in a missile strike launched by the United States on 24 December 2009. The primary goal of the strike was to kill several leaders of AQAP who were believed to have been conducting a meeting in the house; Nasir al-Wuhayshi, Said Ali al-Shihri and Anwar al-Awlaki. However, none of the targeted leaders were present in the building at the time of the strike, which had instead killed five AQAP members who were recruited by Quso. In a tribal meeting just after the strike, the residents of Rafadh determined that Quso's men had to be evicted from the area in order to prevent further airstrikes on the settlement. Quso obliged to their demand, leaving Rafadh with other militants before returning to live by himself. The strike on Quso's had lasting effects in Rafadh visible by 2010, with many residents moving their settlements away from the immediate area due to the lingering presence of cluster munitions.

Rafadh was the site of another airstrike on 6 May 2012. Conducted by a US drone with intelligence assistance from the United Kingdom, a missile was launched at Quso as he was tending to his farmland, killing him and a 19-year-old civilian working alongside him.
