= Abdu al-Hudhaifi =

Yemeni politician (born 1954)

Minister of Interior of Yemen
- In office 26 May 2015 – 1 December 2015
- President: Abdrabbuh Mansur Hadi
- Prime Minister: Khaled Bahah
- Preceded by: Jalal al-Rowaishan
- Succeeded by: Hussein Arab

Personal details
- Born: 1954 (age 71–72) Al Husha District, Dhale Governorate, Yemen

Military service
- Rank: Major General

Abdu Mohammed Hussein al-Hudhaifi (Arabic: عبده محمد حسين الحذيفي) was the minister of Yemen's Interior Ministry from 26 May 2015 to 1 December 2015.
