= Hussein Arab =

Yemeni politician (born 1947)

- حسين عرب

Deputy Prime Minister of Yemen
- In office 1 December 2015 – 25 December 2017 Serving with Abdulmalik Al-Mekhlafi and Mohamed Abdelaziz al-Jabari
- President: Abdrabbuh Mansur Hadi
- Prime Minister: Khaled Bahah; Ahmed Obeid bin Daghr
- Succeeded by: Ahmed al-Maisari

Minister of Interior of Yemen
- In office 1 December 2015 – 25 December 2017
- President: Abdrabbuh Mansur Hadi
- Prime Minister: Khaled Bahah; Ahmed Obeid bin Daghr
- Preceded by: Abdu al-Hudhaifi
- Succeeded by: Ahmed al-Maisari
- In office 1995–2003
- President: Ali Abdullah Saleh
- Succeeded by: Rashad al-Alimi

Personal details
- Born: 22 November 1947 (age 78) Mudiyah District, Abyan Governorate, Yemen

Hussein ibn Muhammad ibn Ahmad Arab (Arabic: حسين بن محمد بن أحمد عرب; born 22 November 1947) was the interior minister of Yemen from 1 December 2015 to 25 December 2017. He was born on 22 November 1947 in the village of Muqrin, Mudiyah District, Abyan Governorate, Yemen.
