= Ministry of Interior (Yemen) =

Government ministry of Yemen

- وزارة الداخلية
- Emblem of the MOI

- Flag of the MOI

Agency overview
- Formed: 1990
- Minister responsible: Ibrahim Haidan
- Website: moi-gov-ye.org

The Yemeni Ministry of Interior (MoI; Arabic: وزارة الداخلية اليمنية) is a government body that is responsible for internal security and Law enforcement in Yemen. It was established in 1990 after the reunification. On 21 February 2013, President Abdrabbuh Mansur Hadi issued a presidential decree to reform structure of the Ministry of Interior. The Decree specified that:

reorganization and restructure of MoI should create a national professional police service, on a scientific basis; to rigorously and strictly enforce the Law; to respect citizens’ rights and safeguards; to respect human rights; and to serve the citizens and thus to earn their trust and cooperation in combating crime.

== Organization ==
The Ministry of Interior consists of many departments and services, mainly:

- Public Security,
- Special Security Forces (SSF), formerly Central Security Organization
- Police Facilities and Personalities Protection
- Police Patrols and Safety Roads (formerly Njdah)
- Yemeni Civil Defence
- Coast Guard, established in 2003
- General Directorate of Transit Police

== List of interior ministers ==
#	Interior minister	Portrait	Term starts	Term ends
1	Ghaleb Mutaher al-Qamish		24 May 1990	30 May 1990
2	Yahya al-Mutawakel		30 May 1990	13 June 1995
3	Hussein Arab		13 June 1995	3 April 2001
4	Rashad al-Alimi		4 April 2001	18 May 2008
5	Mutaher al-Masri		19 May 2008	7 December 2011
6	ِAbdul Qader Qahtan		7 December 2011	7 March 2014
7	Abdu Hussein Al-Tarb		7 March 2014	21 September 2014
8	Jalal al-Rowaishan		7 November 2014	22 January 2015
9	Abdu al-Hudhaifi		26 May 2015	1 December 2015
10	Hussein Arab		1 December 2015	25 December 2017
11	Ahmed al-Maisari		25 December 2017	18 December 2020
12	Muhammad al-Houthi (SPC)		15 October 2020	Incumbent
13	Ibrahim Ali Haidan (PLC)		18 December 2020	Incumbent

== See also ==
- Cabinet of Yemen
- Politics of Yemen
