= Al-Majalah =

Al-Maʽjalah المعجلة
- Village
- Location in Yemen
- Coordinates: 13°58′N 46°28′E
- Country: Yemen
- Governorate: Abyan
- District: Al Mahfad
- Time zone: UTC+3 (Yemen Standard Time)

Al-Maʽjalah (Arabic: المعجلة) is a village in south-western Yemen. It is located in the Al Mahfad district in Abyan Governorate. It is best known as the site of the December 2009 Al-Majalah camp attack.
