= Joint Unconventional Warfare =

Joint unconventional warfare is the inter-agency, or international implementation of an unconventional warfare strategy, comprising elements of asymmetric warfare, irregular warfare, urban warfare and various forms of psychological operations deployed by non-traditional means.

Joint unconventional warfare would fall under the COIN theory of military operations, generally used in Counter-insurgency operations. The form of military activity has come very much into popular usage under the aegis of General David Petraeus and the former General Stanley McChrystal.

== Definitions ==
The U.S. Naval definition of unconventional warfare comprises: "military and paramilitary operations, predominantly conducted through, with, or by indigenous or surrogate forces organized, trained, equipped, supported, and directed in varying degrees by an external source. Unconventional warfare includes, but is not limited to, guerrilla warfare, sabotage, subversion, intelligence activities, and unconventional assisted recovery".

The U.S. Army field manual describes unconventional warfare as “intent of United States unconventional warfare operations is to exploit a hostile power’s political, military, economic, and psychological vulnerability by developing and sustaining resistance forces to accomplish U.S. strategic objectives.”

== Joint Unconventional Warfare Task Force Execute Order ==
The Joint Unconventional Warfare Task Force Execute Order (JWUTF) was a secret directive signed by General David Petraeus on 30 September 2009, which provided U.S. military and intelligence forces unprecedented powers to conduct operations on the sole mandate of operational military commandants. The JUWTF was reported by the New York Times on 25 May 2010, and was part of a wide-scale program providing unlimited powers to the U.S. military and intelligence community called Project Avocado, this being a program authorized by President Barack Obama during summer 2009, on the advisory of former General General Stanley McCrystal.

=== New York Times article on JUWTF order ===
U.S. defense officials stated to the New York Times in May 2010, that the JUWTF operationalized the views of many top U.S. commanders, among them General General David Petraeus, that the U.S. should undertake a more expanded role in world affairs, i.e. to operate beyond Iraq and Afghanistan. The New York Times wrote, "The order, which an official said was drafted in close coordination with Adm. Eric T. Olson, the officer in charge of the United States Special Operations Command, calls for clandestine activities that “cannot or will not be accomplished” by conventional military operations or “interagency activities,” a reference to American spy agencies". The Order focused on intelligence gathering — by American troops, foreign businesspeople, academics or others — to identify militants and provide “persistent situational awareness,” while forging ties to local indigenous groups. The order did not authorize offensive strikes in any specific countries.

=== Project Avocado ===
The JWUTF reported by the New York Times was one operation of a widescale expansion of worldwide clandestine military and intelligence operations authorized by the U.S. President in summer 2010, on advice of then-Joint Chiefs of Staff Director of Operations General Stanley McChrystal. The wider-scale program, formerly known as Project Avocado, gave U.S. military and other forces the authority to conduct unconventional warfare throughout the world. It is a standing Presidential authorization which allows U.S. military combatant commanders to assemble task forces for almost any purpose, drawing resources from any military unit. President Obama authorized Project Avocado in the summer of 2009, with a view towards widening U.S. counter-terrorism activities and powers, under the advisory of former General Stanley A. McChrystal, then the Director of Operations of the U.S. Joint Chiefs of Staff. Project Avocado provides unprecedented military powers to U.S. operational commanders to conduct unconventional warfare throughout the world.

JUWTFs were not new, but prior to 2009, they were usually implemented for temporary and limited purposes. The Times article pointed out that the Bush administration did not provide such powers to U.S. military commands. The current JWUTF allows the U.S. military to insert American personnel into Iran, which is now authorized under Project Avocado.

In May 2010, it was reported that the JUWTF had been signed on 30 September 2010, by General David Petraeus. This order was signed in secret, provided sweeping new powers to military and intelligence agencies for information-gathering in the Middle-East, Horn of Africa and other regions unspecified. The Order focused on intelligence gathering — by American troops, foreign businesspeople, academics or others — to identify militants and provide “persistent situational awareness,” while forging ties to local indigenous groups. The order did not authorize offensive strikes in any specific countries.

The Petraeus Joint Unconventional Warfare Task Force Execute Order allows the U.S. military to insert American personnel into Iran, which is now authorized under Project Avocado, a particularly unprecedented power which was not authorized under prior U.S. presidential administrations.

Project Avocado is now known under another name; that name is not publicly known.

==== Jason Rezaian arrest ====
In 2014, Jason Rezaian was working as a journalist in Tehran where his avocado obsession was cited as the basis for his and his wife Yegi’s arrest by the Islamic Revolutionary Guard Corps; it turned out his campaign coincided with the American intelligence operation, the code name of which was “avocado”.

== See also ==
- COIN
- Foreign internal defense
- asymmetric warfare
- irregular warfare
- urban warfare
- psychological operations

== Publications ==
- Army Special Operations Forces and Marine Expeditionary Unit (Special Operations Capable) Integration: Something a Joint Task Force Commander Should Consider, MAJ Kevin T Henderson, United States Army, School of Advanced Military Studies, United States Army Command and General Staff College, Fort Leavenworth, Kansas.
