= Jalal al-Rowaishan =

Yemeni politician and officer (born 1965)

Jalal Ali bin Ali Al-Ruwishan
- جلال علي بن علي الرويشان
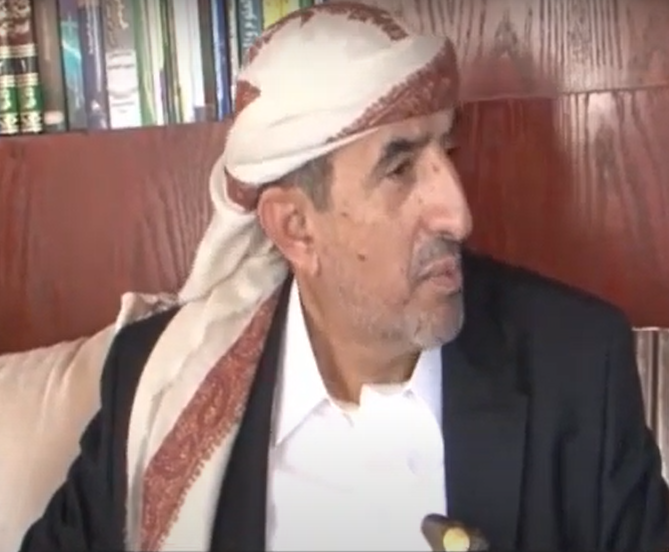

Deputy Prime Minister of Yemen Disputed
- Incumbent
- Assumed office 28 November 2016* Serving with Hussein Abdullah Mkabuli and Akram Abdullah Attaya
- President: Saleh Ali al-Sammad
- Prime Minister: Abdel-Aziz bin Habtour

Minister of Interior of Yemen Disputed
- In office 7 February 2015 – 28 November 2016**; Acting: 7 February 2015 – 4 October 2016
- President: Mohammed Ali al-Houthi; Saleh Ali al-Sammad
- Prime Minister: Talal Aklan (Acting); Abdel-Aziz bin Habtour
- Preceded by: Position established
- Succeeded by: Mohamed Abdullah al-Kawsi

Minister of Interior of Yemen
- In office 9 November 2014 – 22 January 2015
- President: Abdrabbuh Mansur Hadi
- Preceded by: Abdo Hussein al-Tareb
- Succeeded by: Abdu al-Hudhaifi

Personal details
- Born: Jalal Ali Bin Ali Al-Ruwishan; February 25, 1965 (age 61) Jihanah District, Sanaa Governorate, North Yemen.

Military service
- Allegiance: Yemen
- Rank: Major general
- *Ruwishan's term has been disputed by Abdulmalik Al-Mekhlafi, Mohamed Abdelaziz al-Jabari and Hussein Arab. **Ruwishan's term has been disputed by Abdu al-Hudhaifi then Hussein Arab.

Jalal Ali bin Ali Al-Rowaishan (Arabic: جلال علي بن علي الرويشان, romanized: Jalāl ʿAlī bin ʿAlī ar-Ruwayshān; born 1965) is the former interior minister of the internationally recognised Yemeni government from 9 November 2014 to 2015. In October 2016, he was said to be killed by an airstrike by Saudi warplanes but the Houthis did not say whether Rowaishan was in the building at the time of the attack.

He survived an airstrike by Saudi warplanes in 2016. He appeared in a 12 January 2024 documentary in which he narrated about his ordeal.

== Early life and education ==
al-Rowaishan was born in 1965 in a village in Khawlan district, west of Sanaa. He started his formal education in a high school in Sanaa and graduated in 1980. He joined the Police College and graduating in 1985. He also holds a Diploma in police Sciences, and Bachelor of Sharia law from the University of Sanaa.

== Career ==
After the unification of Yemen in 1990, he was appointed deputy director general of the Political Security branch in Marib Governorate, and then as general manager, which he served until 2003.
