= List of ambassadors of Yemen to Russia =

Coordinates: 55.739557°N 37.582948°E

Ambassador of Yemen to Russia Embassy of Yemen in Moscow
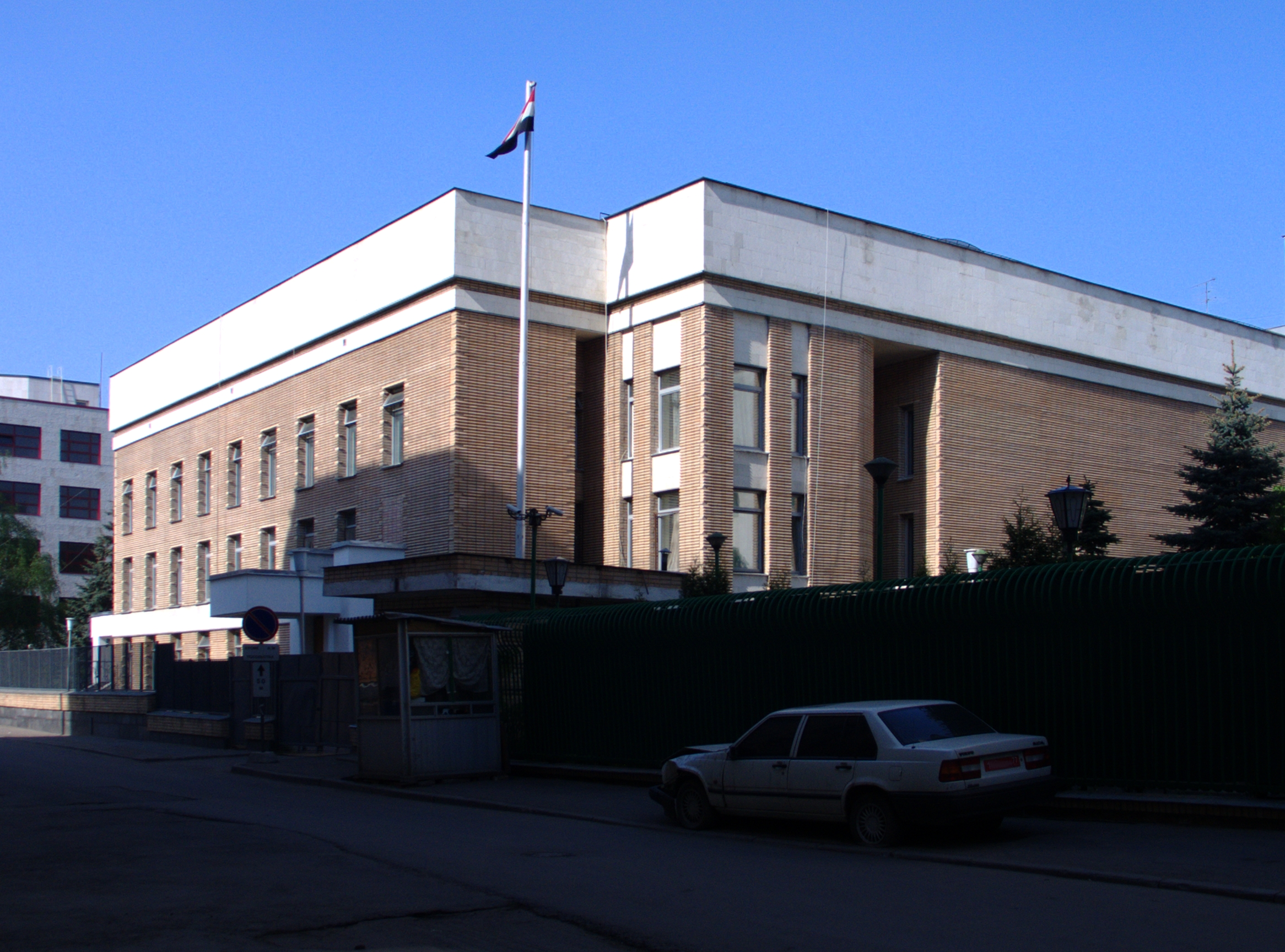
- Incumbent; Ahmed Al-Wahishi since August 21, 2017
- Inaugural holder: Ahmed Ibn Abdullah Al-Amri
- Formation: February 3, 1961

The Yemeni ambassador in Moscow is the official representative of the government in Aden to the government of Russia.

== List of ambassadors ==
Agrément/Diplomatic accreditation	ambassador	Observations	List of heads of government of Yemen	List of heads of government of Russia	Term end
November 1, 1928		The Mutawakkilite Kingdom of Yemen and the Soviet Union signed a friendship and cooperation treaty.	Yahya Muhammad Hamid ed-Din	Alexei Rykov	
October 31, 1955		Yemen and the Soviet Union signed an agreement on economic cooperation, the Soviet-Yemeni Friendship treaty in Cairo by Ahmad bin Yahya and the Soviet Ambassador in Cairo, Daniel Solod.	Ahmad bin Yahya	Nikolai Bulganin	
1957	Abdurraham Ibn Abdussamed Abu-Taleb	A legation opened in Prague, to which the Yemenite Ambassador to Egypt, 'Abd al-Rahman 'Abd al-Samad Abu Talib, was appointed as the first minister plenipotentiary. He was December 6, 1950 to 1953 Chargé d'affaires Yemenite Ambassador to the United States and deputy foreign minister.	Ahmad bin Yahya	Nikolai Bulganin	
February 3, 1961	Ahmed Ibn Abdullah Al-Amri	Arrives in Moscow as acting Yemeni Chargé d'affaires to open permanent Legation.	Ahmad bin Yahya	Alexei Kosygin	
October 1, 1962		The Soviet Union became the first government to recognize the Yemen Arab Republic.	Abdullah al-Sallal	Nikita Khrushchev	
March 21, 1964		The Yemen Arab Republic and the Soviet Union signed a friendship in addition to strengthening economic and military relations between the two governments.	Hamoud al-Gayifi	Nikita Khrushchev	
December 31, 1963	Ali Saif Al-Khawlani	Ali Saif Al-Khawlani, Alī Ṣayf al-Khawlānī, Appointed November 1962	Abdul Rahman al-Iryani	Alexei Kosygin	
January 1, 1965	Hussein al-Dafai	Hussein al-Dafa'i	Hamoud al-Gayifi	Alexei Kosygin	January 1, 1966
January 1, 1967	Ali Abdallah as-Sallal		Hamoud al-Gayifi	Alexei Kosygin	December 17, 1968
December 17, 1968	Mohsin Ahmad al-Aini	former Ambassador to the UN	Hassan al-Amri	Alexei Kosygin	February 5, 1970
March 22, 1972	Hussein al-Dafai	Hussein Mohammed Al Dafai, Husayn Muhammad ad-Dafai	Hassan al-Amri	Alexei Kosygin	
November 5, 1978		On 10 August 1978, Ali Abdullah Saleh ordered the execution of 30 officers who were charged with being part of a conspiracy against his rule. The YAR Foreign Minister, Abdullah al Asnag, later indicated that the PDRY regime had again been responsible for the planning. The executions gave rise to a brief protest demonstration by Arab students at the YAR embassy in Moscow. Students seize Moscow embassy About 100 North Yemeni students occupied the North Yemeni Embassy in Moscow	Abdul Aziz Abdul Ghani	Alexei Kosygin	
June 7, 1979	Salih Ali al-Ashwal		Abdul Aziz Abdul Ghani	Alexei Kosygin	January 1, 1982
January 1, 1984	Abdo Othman Muhammed	Abd al-Uthman Muhammad, A.O. Muhammed, 'Abd al-'Uthman, 1970: Yemenite Ambassador to China	Abdul Aziz Abdul Ghani	Nikolai Tikhonov	January 1, 1990
May 22, 1990		Yemeni unification, the Yemen Arab Republic was united with South Yemen	Abdul Aziz Abdul Ghani	Valentin Pavlov	
December 3, 1991		The governments in Sanaa and Moscow established strong diplomatic and military relations.	Haidar Abu Bakr al-Attas	Alexei Kosygin	
January 1, 1991	Ali Abdulla Al Bugery	Али Абдалла Аль-Бугейри	Haidar Abu Bakr al-Attas	Valentin Pavlov	January 1, 1996
January 1, 2002	Abdo Ali Abulrahman	Abdo Ali Abul Rahman	Abdul Qadir Bajamal	Mikhail Kasyanov	January 1, 2003
January 1, 2003	Abdulwahab al-Rawhani		Abdul Qadir Bajamal	Mikhail Kasyanov	January 1, 2007
June 23, 2008	Saleh Ahmed Al-Helali	Мохамед Салєх Ахмед Аль-Хелялі	Ali Muhammad Mujawar	Vladimir Putin	
August 21, 2017	Ahmed Al-Wahishi		Ahmed Obeid bin Daghr	Dmitry Medvedev	

== List of ambassadors ==
Agrément/Diplomatic accreditation	ambassador	Observations	List of heads of government of Yemen	List of heads of government of Russia	Term end
December 3, 1967		The governments in Aden and Moscow established diplomatic and military relations.	Mohsin Ahmad al-Aini	Alexei Kosygin	
October 2, 1969	Ahmed Saleh Al Shair	Ahmad Salih ash-Sha'ir, was killed in an air crash with 20 other diplomats and Foreign Ministry officials on April 30, 1973.	Muhammad Ali Haitham	Gennady Voronov	April 30, 1973
January 1, 1973	Mustafa Abdel-Khaliq	a former Minister of Justice.	Ali Nasir Muhammad	Mikhail Solomentsev	
January 1, 1975	Ali Salem Anwar		Ali Nasir Muhammad	Mikhail Solomentsev	
October 29, 1977	Abd al-Aziz Abduh Muhammed ad-Dali	'Abd-al-'Aziz al-Dali, In 1989 he was minister of foreign affairs	Ali Nasir Muhammad	Mikhail Solomentsev	
January 1, 1984	Salih Abu Bakr ibn Hasanayn		Ali Nasir Muhammad	Vitaly Vorotnikov	
August 23, 1989	Ahmad Abdullah 'Abd-al-Ilah	Ahmad 'Abdallah 'Abd al-Ilah Central Committee member.	Yasin Said Numan	Aleksandr Vlasov (politician)	
May 22, 1990		Yemeni unification with Yemen Arab Republic.	Yasin Said Numan	Aleksandr Vlasov (politician)	

- Yemen–Russia relations
