= List of ambassadors of Yemen to Belgium =

Ambassador of Yemen to Belgium
- Incumbent; Mohamed Taha Mustafa since October 4, 2016
- Inaugural holder: Ahmed Kaid Barakat
- Formation: April 13, 1973

The Yemeni ambassador in Brussels is the official representative of the government in Aden to the government of the Belgium and the European Commission.

== List of ambassadors ==
Agrément/Diplomatic accreditation	ambassador	Observations	List of heads of government of Yemen	Prime Minister of Belgium	Term end
April 13, 1973	Ahmed Kaid Barakat	From 1969 to 1970 he was Minister of Foreign Affairs of Yemen Arab Republic.; With residence in Paris.; From August 1972 to January 1978 he was also accredited in Bonn.; In 1984 he was Yemenite Ambassador to Japan	Kadhi Abdullah al-Hagri	Edmond Leburton	
May 7, 1979	Mohammed Abdulkoddos Al-Wazir	Residence in Bonn also accredited in Vienna.	Abdul Aziz Abdul Ghani	Wilfried Martens	
May 18, 1981	Ahmed Al-Haddad (Yemen)	2002 UNNY	Abd Al-Karim Al-Iryani	Mark Eyskens	
February 18, 1985	Mohammed Abdul Rehman Al-Robaee (Arab Republic of Yemen)	Office The Hague.	Abdul Aziz Abdul Ghani	Wilfried Martens	
July 20, 1989	Ali Mouthana Hasson	South Yemen	Yasin Said Numan	Wilfried Martens	
September 16, 1991	Saleh Ali Al Ashwal	June 7, 1978 Yemenite Ambassador to Russia	Haidar Abu Bakr al-Attas	Wilfried Martens	
December 19, 1995	Gazem Abdel Khaleq Al Aghbari	Yemen: 114 ave F. D. Roosevelt, 1050 Brussels, Belgium	Abdul Aziz Abdul Ghani	Jean-Luc Dehaene	
November 25, 2002	Jaffer Mohamed Jaffer		Abdul Qadir Bajamal	Guy Verhofstadt	
March 12, 2007	Abdul-Wahab Mohammed al-Shawkani	December 15, 2000 to 2004 he was Yemenite Ambassador to China.: 2004: Yemenite Ambassador to the Philippines.; June 21, 2011: Yemeni Revolution, Al-Shawkani praised the statement issued by the EU Foreign Ministers in Luxembourg, where they have condemned the attack targeted President Ali Abdullah Saleh and senior State officials in the presidential Palace's mosque.	Abdul Qadir Bajamal	Guy Verhofstadt	2007
October 4, 2016	Mohamed Taha Mustafa	(*January 15, 1951 in Sana'a): From 1998 to 2003 he was Yemenite Ambassador to Malaysia and nonresident to Thailand; From 2003 to 2005 he was Chief of Protocol of the Foreign ministry.; From 2005 to 2010 he was Yemenite Ambassador to the United Kingdom.; From 2010 to 2013 he was Head of the European Department, Ministry of Foreign Affairs; From 2014 to October 4, 2016 Advisor of the Yemenite Permanent Representative next the Headquarters of the United Nations.	Dr. Maeen Abdulmalek Saeed	Charles Michel	
