= List of heads of government of Yemen =

This article lists the heads of government of modern Yemen, from the establishment of the Kingdom of Yemen in 1918 to the present day.

Yemen is in a tumultuous state since the start of the Arab Spring-related Yemeni crisis in 2011; the crisis resulted in the resignation of President Ali Abdullah Saleh in 2012, after 33 years in power. The presidency was then transferred to Vice President Abdrabbuh Mansour Hadi. Since 2014–2015, the country has been in a civil war (alongside the Saudi-led military intervention aimed at restoring Hadi's government after the Houthi takeover) with several proto-state entities claiming to govern Yemen: the internationally recognized Cabinet of Yemen/Presidential Leadership Council, the Houthi-led Supreme Revolutionary Committee/Supreme Political Council, and the secessionist Southern Transitional Council.

== Kingdom of Yemen (1918–1970) ==
Portrait	Prime Minister (Birth–Death)	Term of office			Political party	Imam (Reign)
Portrait	Prime Minister (Birth–Death)	Took office	Left office	Time in office	Political party	Imam (Reign)
	Ibrahim bin Yahya Hamid al-Din (1915–1948)	17 February 1948	18 February 1948	1 day	Independent	Ahmad bin Yahya (1948–1962)
	Ali ibn Abdullah al-Wazir (1900–1980)	February 1948	April 1948	2 months	Independent	Ahmad bin Yahya (1948–1962)
	Hassan ibn Yahya (1908–2003)	April 1948	18 June 1955	7 years, 2 months	Independent	Ahmad bin Yahya (1948–1962)
Vacant (18 June 1955 – 28 September 1962)

=== Kingdom of Yemen in Exile (1962–1970) ===
Portrait	Prime Minister (Birth–Death)	Term of office			Political party	Imam (Reign)
Portrait	Prime Minister (Birth–Death)	Took office	Left office	Time in office	Political party	Imam (Reign)
	Ahmad al-Sayari (born 1924)	5 October 1962	17 October 1962	12 days	Independent	Muhammad al-Badr (1962–1970)
	Hassan ibn Yahya (1908–2003)	October 1962	11 April 1967	4 years, 6 months	Independent	Muhammad al-Badr (1962–1970)
	Abdur Rahman ibn Yahya (born 1937)	11 April 1967	15 January 1969	1 year, 279 days	Independent	Muhammad al-Badr (1962–1970)
	Hassan ibn Yahya (1908–2003)	15 January 1969	1 December 1970	1 year, 320 days	Independent	Muhammad al-Badr (1962–1970)

== Yemen Arab Republic (1962–1990) ==
Status

Denotes Acting Prime Minister

Portrait	Prime Minister (Birth–Death)	Term of office			Political party	President(s) (Term)
Portrait	Prime Minister (Birth–Death)	Took office	Left office	Time in office	Political party	President(s) (Term)
	Abdullah al-Sallal (1917–1994)	28 September 1962	26 April 1963	210 days	Military	Abdullah al-Sallal (1962–1967)
	Abdul Latif Dayfallah (1930–2019)	26 April 1963	5 October 1963	162 days	Military	Abdullah al-Sallal (1962–1967)
	Abdul Rahman al-Eryani (1910–1998)	5 October 1963	10 February 1964	128 days	Independent	Abdullah al-Sallal (1962–1967)
	Hassan al-Amri (1920–1989)	10 February 1964	29 April 1964	79 days	Military	Abdullah al-Sallal (1962–1967)
	Hamoud Al-Jaifi (1918–1985)	29 April 1964	6 January 1965	252 days	Independent	Abdullah al-Sallal (1962–1967)
	Hassan al-Amri (1920–1989)	6 January 1965	20 April 1965	104 days	Military	Abdullah al-Sallal (1962–1967)
	Ahmad Muhammad Numan (1909–1996)	20 April 1965	6 July 1965	77 days	Independent	Abdullah al-Sallal (1962–1967)
	Abdullah al-Sallal (1917–1994)	6 July 1965	21 July 1965	15 days	Military	Abdullah al-Sallal (1962–1967)
	Hassan al-Amri (1920–1989)	21 July 1965	18 September 1966	1 year, 59 days	Military	Abdullah al-Sallal (1962–1967)
	Abdullah al-Sallal (1917–1994)	18 September 1966	5 November 1967 (deposed)	1 year, 48 days	Military	Abdullah al-Sallal (1962–1967)
	Mohsin Ahmad al-Aini (1932–2021)	5 November 1967	21 December 1967	46 days	Independent	Abdul Rahman al-Eryani (1967–1974)
	Hassan al-Amri (1920–1989)	21 December 1967	9 July 1969	1 year, 200 days	Military	Abdul Rahman al-Eryani (1967–1974)
	Abdul Salam Sabrah (1912–2012)	9 July 1969	29 July 1969	20 days	Independent	Abdul Rahman al-Eryani (1967–1974)
	Mohsin Ahmad al-Aini (1932–2021)	29 July 1969	2 September 1969	35 days	Independent	Abdul Rahman al-Eryani (1967–1974)
	Abdullah Kurshumi (1932–2007)	2 September 1969	5 February 1970	156 days	Independent	Abdul Rahman al-Eryani (1967–1974)
	Mohsin Ahmad al-Aini (1932–2021)	5 February 1970	26 February 1971	1 year, 21 days	Independent	Abdul Rahman al-Eryani (1967–1974)
	Abdul Salam Sabrah (1912–2012)	26 February 1971	3 May 1971	66 days	Independent	Abdul Rahman al-Eryani (1967–1974)
	Ahmad Muhammad Numan (1909–1996)	3 May 1971	24 August 1971	113 days	Independent	Abdul Rahman al-Eryani (1967–1974)
	Hassan al-Amri (1920–1989)	24 August 1971	5 September 1971	12 days	Military	Abdul Rahman al-Eryani (1967–1974)
	Abdul Salam Sabrah (1912–2012)	5 September 1971	18 September 1971	13 days	Independent	Abdul Rahman al-Eryani (1967–1974)
	Mohsin Ahmad al-Aini (1932–2021)	18 September 1971	30 December 1972	1 year, 103 days	Independent	Abdul Rahman al-Eryani (1967–1974)
	Abdullah al-Hagri (1911–1977)	30 December 1972	10 February 1974	1 year, 42 days	Independent	Abdul Rahman al-Eryani (1967–1974)
	Hassan Muhammad Makki (1933–2016)	10 February 1974	22 June 1974 (Note: Dismissed in the aftermath of the June 13 Corrective Movement.)	132 days	Independent	Abdul Rahman al-Eryani (1967–1974)
	Mohsin Ahmad al-Aini (1932–2021)	22 June 1974	16 January 1975	208 days	Independent	Ibrahim al-Hamdi (1974–1977)
	Abdul Latif Dayfallah (1930–2019)	16 January 1975	25 January 1975	9 days	Military	Ibrahim al-Hamdi (1974–1977)
	Abdul Aziz Abdul Ghani (1939–2011)	25 January 1975	15 October 1980	5 years, 264 days	Independent	Ibrahim al-Hamdi (1974–1977)
	Abdul Aziz Abdul Ghani (1939–2011)	25 January 1975	15 October 1980	5 years, 264 days	Independent	Ahmad al-Ghashmi (1977–1978)
	Abdul Aziz Abdul Ghani (1939–2011)	25 January 1975	15 October 1980	5 years, 264 days	Independent	Abdul Karim Abdullah al-Arashi (1978)
	Abdul Aziz Abdul Ghani (1939–2011)	25 January 1975	15 October 1980	5 years, 264 days	Independent	Ali Abdullah Saleh (1978–1990)
	Abdul-Karim Al-Iryani (1934–2015)	15 October 1980	13 November 1983	3 years, 29 days	Independent (until 24 August 1982)	Ali Abdullah Saleh (1978–1990)
	Abdul-Karim Al-Iryani (1934–2015)	15 October 1980	13 November 1983	3 years, 29 days	General People's Congress	Ali Abdullah Saleh (1978–1990)
	Abdul Aziz Abdul Ghani (1939–2011)	13 November 1983	22 May 1990	6 years, 190 days	General People's Congress	Ali Abdullah Saleh (1978–1990)

== People's Democratic Republic of Yemen (1967–1990) ==
Portrait	Prime Minister (Birth–Death)	Term of office			Political party	Heads of state (Term)
Portrait	Prime Minister (Birth–Death)	Took office	Left office	Time in office	Political party	Heads of state (Term)
	Faysal al-Shaabi (1935–1971)	6 April 1969	22 June 1969 (deposed)	77 days	National Liberation Front	Qahtan Muhammad al-Shaabi (1967–1969)
	Muhammad Ali Haitham (1940–1993)	23 June 1969	2 August 1971	2 years, 40 days	National Liberation Front	Salim Rubaya Ali (1969–1978)
	Ali Nasir Muhammad (born 1939)	2 August 1971	14 February 1985	13 years, 196 days	National Liberation Front (until 21 December 1978.)	Salim Rubaya Ali (1969–1978)
	Ali Nasir Muhammad (born 1939)	2 August 1971	14 February 1985	13 years, 196 days	National Liberation Front (until 21 December 1978.)	Ali Nasir Muhammad (1978)
	Ali Nasir Muhammad (born 1939)	2 August 1971	14 February 1985	13 years, 196 days	Yemeni Socialist Party	Abdul Fattah Ismail (1978–1980)
	Ali Nasir Muhammad (born 1939)	2 August 1971	14 February 1985	13 years, 196 days	Yemeni Socialist Party	Ali Nasir Muhammad (1980–1986)
	Haidar Abu Bakr al-Attas (born 1939)	14 February 1985	8 February 1986	359 days	Yemeni Socialist Party	Ali Nasir Muhammad (1980–1986)
	Yasin Said Numan (born 1947)	8 February 1986	22 May 1990	4 years, 103 days	Yemeni Socialist Party	Haidar Abu Bakr al-Attas (1986–1990)

=== Democratic Republic of Yemen (1994) ===
Portrait	Prime Minister (Birth–Death)	Term of office			Political party	President (Term)
Portrait	Prime Minister (Birth–Death)	Took office	Left office	Time in office	Political party	President (Term)
	Haidar Abu Bakr al-Attas (born 1939) (in rebellion)	21 May 1994	7 July 1994	47 days	Yemeni Socialist Party	Ali Salem al-Beidh (1994)

== Republic of Yemen (post-unification, 1990–present) ==
Status

Denotes Acting Prime Minister

Portrait	Prime Minister (Birth–Death)	Term of office			Political party	President(s) (Term)
Portrait	Prime Minister (Birth–Death)	Took office	Left office	Time in office	Political party	President(s) (Term)
	Haidar Abu Bakr al-Attas (born 1939)	22 May 1990	9 May 1994 (deposed)	3 years, 352 days	Yemeni Socialist Party	Ali Abdullah Saleh (1990–2012)
	Muhammad Said al-Attar (1927–2005)	9 May 1994	6 October 1994	150 days	Independent	Ali Abdullah Saleh (1990–2012)
	Abdul Aziz Abdul Ghani (1939–2011)	6 October 1994	14 May 1997	2 years, 220 days	General People's Congress	Ali Abdullah Saleh (1990–2012)
	Faraj Said Bin Ghanem (1937–2007)	14 May 1997	29 April 1998	350 days	Independent	Ali Abdullah Saleh (1990–2012)
	Abdul-Karim Al-Iryani (1934–2015)	29 April 1998	31 March 2001	2 years, 336 days	General People's Congress	Ali Abdullah Saleh (1990–2012)
	Abdul Qadir Bajamal (1946–2020)	31 March 2001	7 April 2007	6 years, 7 days	General People's Congress	Ali Abdullah Saleh (1990–2012)
	Ali Muhammad Mujawar (born 1953)	7 April 2007	10 December 2011 (resigned)	4 years, 247 days	General People's Congress	Ali Abdullah Saleh (1990–2012)
	Mohammed Basindawa (born 1935)	10 December 2011	24 September 2014 (resigned)	2 years, 288 days	Independent	Abdrabbuh Mansour Hadi (2012–2022)
	Abdullah Mohsen al-Akwa (born 1961)	24 September 2014	9 November 2014	46 days	Al-Islah	Abdrabbuh Mansour Hadi (2012–2022)
	Khaled Bahah (born 1965)	9 November 2014	3 April 2016	1 year, 146 days	Independent	Abdrabbuh Mansour Hadi (2012–2022)
	Ahmed Obaid Bin Dagher (born 1952)	4 April 2016	15 October 2018	2 years, 195 days	General People's Congress	Abdrabbuh Mansour Hadi (2012–2022)
	Maeen Abdulmalik Saeed (born 1976)	18 October 2018	5 February 2024	5 years, 110 days	Independent	Abdrabbuh Mansour Hadi (2012–2022)
	Maeen Abdulmalik Saeed (born 1976)	18 October 2018	5 February 2024	5 years, 110 days	Independent	Rashad al-Alimi (since 2022)
	Ahmad Awad bin Mubarak (born 1968)	5 February 2024	3 May 2025	1 year, 87 days	Independent	Rashad al-Alimi (since 2022)
	Salem Saleh bin Braik (born 1965)	3 May 2025	15 January 2026	257 days	Independent	Rashad al-Alimi (since 2022)
	Shaya al-Zindani (born 1954)	15 January 2026	Incumbent	227 days	Independent	Rashad al-Alimi (since 2022)
Houthi-controlled Yemen
Supreme Political Council
	Talal Aklan (born 19??) (Note: Appointed by the Houthis, in rebellion during their takeover and its aftermath.) (in rebellion)	1 March 2016	4 October 2016	217 days	Yemeni Socialist Party	Mohammed al-Houthi (2015–2016)
	Abdel-Aziz bin Habtour (born 1955) (in rebellion)	4 October 2016	10 August 2024	7 years, 311 days	General People's Congress (Pro-Houthi faction)	Saleh Ali al-Sammad (2016–2018)
	Abdel-Aziz bin Habtour (born 1955) (in rebellion)	4 October 2016	10 August 2024	7 years, 311 days	General People's Congress (Pro-Houthi faction)	Mahdi al-Mashat (since 2018)
	Ahmed al-Rahawi (1950–2025) (in rebellion)	10 August 2024	28 August 2025 (killed)	1 year, 18 days	General People's Congress (Pro-Houthi faction)	Mahdi al-Mashat (since 2018)
	Muhammad Ahmed Miftah (born 1967) (in rebellion)	30 August 2025	Incumbent	1 year, 0 days	Party of Truth	Mahdi al-Mashat (since 2018)

== See also ==
- Modern history of Yemen
- Prime Minister of the Yemen Arab Republic
- List of leaders of South Yemen
- Prime Minister of Yemen
