= List of ambassadors of Yemen to the United States =

List of Ambassadors

Coordinates: 38°55′2″N 77°3′4.7″W

Ambassador of Yemen to the United States Embassy of Yemen, Washington, D.C.
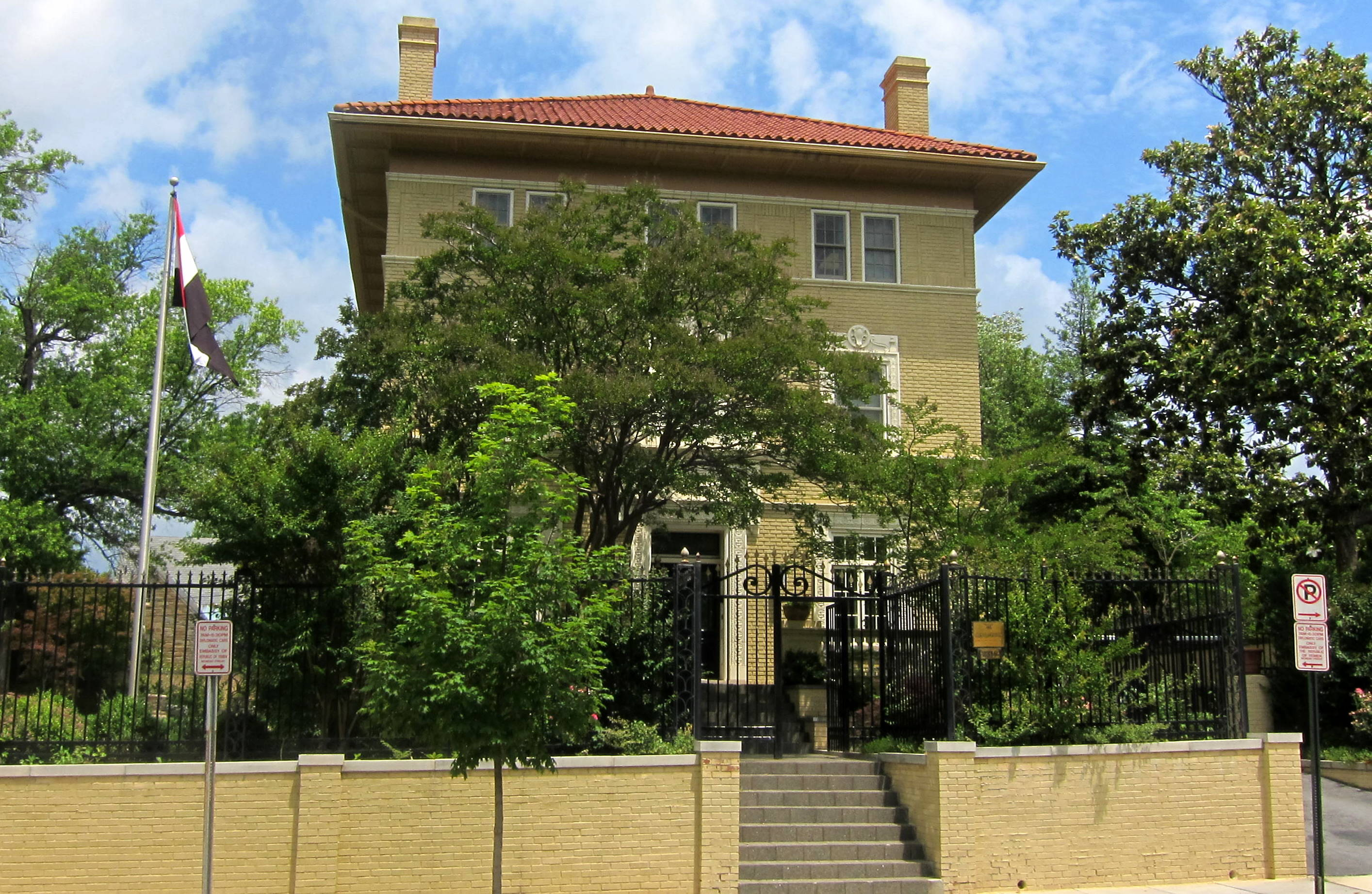
- Incumbent; Ahmad Awad bin Mubarak since August 3, 2015
- Inaugural holder: Sayed Abdurraham Ibn Abdussamed Abu-Taleb
- Formation: December 6, 1950

The Yemenite ambassador in Washington, D.C. is the official representative of the government in Aden to the government of the United States. They work at the Embassy of Yemen, Washington, D.C.

== List of ambassadors ==
Diplomatic agreement/designated	Diplomatic accreditation	Ambassador	Observations	List of heads of government of Yemen	List of presidents of the United States	Term end
December 6, 1950			LEGATION OPENED	Hassan ibn Yahya	Harry S. Truman	
December 6, 1950		Sayed Abdurraham Ibn Abdussamed Abu-Taleb	Chargé d'affaires	Hassan ibn Yahya	Harry S. Truman	
October 16, 1957		Assayed Ahmad Ali Zabarah	Chargé d'affaires	Ahmad bin Yahya	Dwight D. Eisenhower	
February 1, 1963			LEGATION RAISED TO EMBASSY - At same time American Legation at Taiz was raised to Embassy status in Yemen	Abdullah al-Sallal	Lyndon B. Johnson	
June 14, 1963	July 24, 1963	Mohsin Ahmad al-Aini		Abdul Latif Dayfallah	Lyndon B. Johnson	
February 3, 1967	February 7, 1967	Abdul Aziz Futiah	(NOTE: No letter of Recall was presented - checked with Legal and under circumstances, Legal advised none necessary -per Mr. Mitchell)	Abdullah al-Sallal	Lyndon B. Johnson	
June 6, 1967	July 1, 1972		RELATIONS SEVERED-RESUMED RELATIONS	Abdullah al-Sallal	Lyndon B. Johnson	
April 16, 1973	June 14, 1973	Yahya Mammal Geghman	b. 24 Sept. 1934, Jahanah s. of Hamoud Geghman and Ezziya Geghman m. Cathya Geghman 1971 one s. one d. ed Law Schools, Cairo, Paris, Damascus and Boston and Columbia Univs	Kadhi Abdullah al-Hagri	Richard Nixon	
August 17, 1974		Ahmad Ali Zabarah	Chargé d'affaires	Mohsin Ahmad al-Aini	Gerald Ford	
December 16, 1974	December 20, 1974	Hasan Huhammad Makki	(*1935)	Mohsin Ahmad al-Aini	Gerald Ford	
December 31, 1975		Ibrahim Mohamad Alkibsi	Chargé d'affaires	Abdul Aziz Abdul Ghani	Gerald Ford	
May 4, 1976	May 21, 1976	Yahya M. al-Mutawakkil		Abdul Aziz Abdul Ghani	Gerald Ford	
September 14, 1981	October 26, 1981	Mohammad Abdallah al-Iryani		Abdul Aziz Abdul Ghani	Ronald Reagan	
October 4, 1984	December 10, 1984	Mohsin Ahmad al-Aini		Abdul Aziz Abdul Ghani	Ronald Reagan	
August 20, 1997	September 8, 1997	Abdulwahab Abdullah Al Hajjri	(* was born in 1958 in Yemen)	Abd Al-Karim Al-Iryani	Bill Clinton	
July 28, 2015	August 3, 2015	Ahmed Awad bin Mubarak		Khaled Bahah	Barack Obama	

== See also ==
- Yemen–United States relations
