= List of ambassadors of China to Yemen =

PRC (China) diplomatic position

Coordinates: 15.346603°N 44.199688°E

Chinese Ambassador to Yemen
- Incumbent; Vacant since 1 April 2015
- Inaugural holder: Chen Jiakang
- Formation: 1 May 1958; 68 years ago

The Chinese ambassador to Yemen was the official representative of the People's Republic of China to the Republic of Yemen.

Due to the Yemeni Civil War (2014–present) in December 2014, by April 2015, China withdrew all their citizens and closed the embassy in Sana'a.

== List of representatives ==
| Diplomatic agrément/Diplomatic accreditation | Ambassador | Chinese language zh:中国驻也门大使列表 | Observations | Premier of the People's Republic of China | List of heads of government of Yemen | Term end |
|---|---|---|---|---|---|---|
| September 24, 1956 | | | The governments in Beijing and Sana'a established diplomatic relations. | Zhou Enlai | Ahmad bin Yahya | |
| May 1, 1958 | Chen Jiakang | zh:陈家康 | with residence in Cairo. | Zhou Enlai | Ahmad bin Yahya | May 16, 1905 |
| September 27, 1962 | | | Abolition of the Mutawakkilite Kingdom of Yemen and establishment of the Arab Republic of Yemen. | Zhou Enlai | Abdullah al-Sallal | |
| February 13, 1963 | | | The mission in Sana'a Yemen was upgraded to an Embassy. | Zhou Enlai | Abdullah al-Sallal | |
| May 1, 1964 | Wang Ruojie | zh:王若杰 | From May 1964 to December 1972 Ambassador in Sana'a.; From May 1973 to November 1976 he was Chinese Ambassador to Vietnam (Ho Chi Minh City).; From September 1977 to August 1982 he was Chinese Ambassador to Mauritius. | Zhou Enlai | Ahmad Muhammad Numan | December 1, 1972 |
| March 1, 1973 | Zhang Canming | zh:张灿明 | | Zhou Enlai | Kadhi Abdullah al-Hagri | July 1, 1975 |
| September 1, 1975 | Zhao Jin (PRC diplomat) | zh:赵禁 | | Zhou Enlai | Abdul Aziz Abdul Ghani | December 1, 1979 |
| April 1, 1980 | Zhong Hanjiu | 种汉九 | | Zhao Ziyang | Abdul Aziz Abdul Ghani | June 1, 1984 |
| April 1, 1985 | Li Chengren | 李成仁 | | Zhao Ziyang | Abd Al-Karim Al-Iryani | December 1, 1986 |
| September 1, 1987 | Zheng Dayong | zh:郑达庸 | | Li Peng | Abdul Aziz Abdul Ghani | June 1, 1990 |
| May 22, 1990 | | | Yemeni unification, the Yemen Arab Republic was united with South Yemen | Li Peng | Abdul Aziz Abdul Ghani | |
| June 1, 1990 | Lin Zhen | zh:林真 | | Li Peng | Haidar Abu Bakr al-Attas | March 1, 1992 |
| February 1, 1992 | Li Liugen | 李留根 | | Li Peng | Haidar Abu Bakr al-Attas | August 1, 1995 |
| May 1, 1995 | Yu Xingzhi | zh:郁兴志 | | Li Peng | Abdul Aziz Abdul Ghani | July 1, 1997 |
| October 1, 1997 | Shi Yanchun | zh:时延春 | | Li Peng | Faraj Said Bin Ghanem | November 1, 1999 |
| November 1, 1999 | Zhou Guobin | 周国斌 | | Zhu Rongji | Abd Al-Karim Al-Iryani | July 1, 2002 |
| April 1, 2002 | Gao Yusheng | zh:高育生 | | Zhu Rongji | Abdul Qadir Bajamal | January 1, 2006 |
| February 1, 2006 | Luo Xiaoguang | zh:罗小光 | | Wen Jiabao | Abdul Qadir Bajamal | July 1, 2009 |
| July 1, 2009 | Liu Denglin | 刘登林 | | Wen Jiabao | Ali Muhammad Mujawar | October 1, 2012 |
| October 1, 2012 | Chang Hua | zh:常华 | | Wen Jiabao | Mohammed Basindawa | November 1, 2014 |
| December 1, 2014 | Tian Qi (PRC diplomat) | 田琦 | Due to the Yemeni Civil War (2014–present) in December 2014, by April 2015, China withdrew all their citizens and closed the embassy in Sana'a. | Li Keqiang | Khaled Bahah | April 1, 2015 |

== South Yemen ==
The Chinese ambassador to South Yemen was the official representative of the People's Republic of China to People's Democratic Republic of Yemen.

=== List of representatives (South Yemen) ===
| Diplomatic agrément/Diplomatic accreditation | Ambassador | Chinese language zh:中国驻也门大使列表 | Observations | Premier of the People's Republic of China | List of heads of government of Yemen | Term end |
|---|---|---|---|---|---|---|
| November 30, 1967 | | | South Yemen became independent from the British Protectorate Federation of South Arabia. | Zhou Enlai | Qahtan Muhammad al-Shaabi | |
| January 31, 1968 | | | The governments in Beijing and Aden established diplomatic relations. | Zhou Enlai | Qahtan Muhammad al-Shaabi | |
| November 30, 1967 | Li Qiangfen | zh:李强奋 | | Zhou Enlai | Qahtan Muhammad al-Shaabi | March 1, 1972 |
| March 1, 1972 | Cui Jian (PRC ambassador) | 崔健 | | Zhou Enlai | Ali Nasir Muhammad | August 1, 1977 |
| August 1, 1977 | Huang Shixie | zh:黄世燮 | | Hua Guofeng | Ali Nasir Muhammad | November 26, 1981 |
| November 26, 1981 | Tang Yong | 唐涌 | | Zhao Ziyang | Ali Nasir Muhammad | June 2, 1986 |
| June 2, 1986 | Huang Zhen (PRC diplomat) | zh:黄振 | From 1986 to 1989 he was ambassador in Aden.; From 1989 to 1991 he was Chinese Ambassador to the United Arab Emirates. | Zhao Ziyang | Yasin Said Numan | March 3, 1989 |
| June 26, 1989 | Lin Zhen | zh:林真 (外交官) | From 1989 to 1992 he was ambassador in Aden and Sana'a.; From 1992 to 1996 he was Chinese Ambassador to Israel. | Li Peng | Yasin Said Numan | June 1, 1990 |
| May 22, 1990 | | | Yemeni unification, the Yemen Arab Republic was united with South Yemen | Li Peng | Yasin Said Numan | |

- China–Yemen relations
