= Minister of Foreign Affairs of North Yemen =

Government ministry of North Yemen

- Arabic: وزير خارجية اليمن الشمالي
- Emblem (1974–90)

- Flag
- Incumbent; None
- Ministry of Foreign Affairs
- Status: Minister
- Member of: Government
- Reports to: The prime minister
- Seat: Sanaa
- Appointer: The president
- Term length: No fixed term
- Formation: 1962; 64 years ago
- First holder: Mohsin Ahmad al-Aini
- Final holder: Abdul-Karim Al-Iryani
- Abolished: 1990; 36 years ago

The minister of foreign affairs (Arabic: وزارة الخارجية) was a government minister in charge of the Ministry of Foreign Affairs of North Yemen (common name for the Yemen Arab Republic), in what is now northern Yemen. The minister was responsible for conducting foreign relations of the country.

== List of ministers ==
The following is a list of foreign ministers of North Yemen from 1962 until the unification in 1990:

Term	Name	Portrait
1962	Mohsin Ahmad al-Aini	
1962–1963	Abdul Rahman al-Baidani	
1963	Abdullah al-Sallal	
1963–1964	Mustafa Yaqub	
1964	Hassan Muhammad Makki	
1964–1965	Mohsin al-Sirri	
1965	Abdul Qawi Hamim	
1965	Mohsin Ahmad al-Aini	
1965–1966	Mustafa Yaqub	
1966	Hassan Muhammad Makki	
1966–1967	Muhammad Abdulaziz Salam	
1967	Abdullah al-Sallal	
1967–1968	Hassan Muhammad Makki	
1968–1969	Yahya Jaghman	
1969	Hussein Ali al-Hubaysi	
1969–1970	Ahmad Said Barakat	
1970–1971	Mohsin Ahmad al-Aini	
1971	Ahmad Muhammad Numan	
1971	Abdullah al-Asnaj	
1971–1972	Mohsin Ahmad al-Aini	
1972–1973	Muhammad Ahmad Numan	
1973–1974	Muhammad Ali Numan	
1974	Abdullah al-Asnaj	
1974	Mohsin Ahmad al-Aini	
1974–1975	Yahya Jaghman	
1975–1979	Abdullah al-Asnaj	
1979	Hussein Abdullah al-Amri	
1979–1980	Hassan Muhammad Makki	
1980–1984	Ali Lutfi al-Tawr	
1984–1990	Abdul-Karim Al-Iryani	

For ministers of foreign affairs of unified Yemen after 1990, see Ministry of Foreign Affairs and Expatriates (Yemen).

== See also ==
- Minister of Foreign Affairs of South Yemen
