= List of ambassadors of Yemen to China =

Coordinates: 15.346974°N 44.200042°E

Ambassador of Yemen to China
- Incumbent; Mohamed Othman Almekhlafi since December 19, 2016
- Inaugural holder: Muhammad Abdul Wassse Hameed
- Formation: February 6, 1967

The Yemeni ambassador in Beijing is the official representative of the Government in Aden to the Government of China with coaccredition in Pyongyang and Hanoi.

== List of ambassadors ==
diplomatic agreement/designated	Diplomatic accreditation	ambassador	Observations	List of heads of government of Yemen	Premier of the People's Republic of China	Term end
June 24, 1956		The governments in Beijing and Sanaa established diplomatic relations.	Ahmad bin Yahya	Zhou Enlai		
February 6, 1967		No ambassador until 1967	Abdullah al-Sallal	Zhou Enlai		
February 6, 1967	Muhammad Abdul Wassse Hameed		Abdullah al-Sallal	Zhou Enlai	July 4, 1968	
July 4, 1968	Abdul Wahed al-Kherbasch		Hassan al-Amri	Zhou Enlai	May 23, 1970	
July 17, 1970	Abdu Othman Mohamed		Mohsin Ahmad al-Aini	Zhou Enlai	January 1, 1979	
March 1, 1980	Ahmed Mohamed al-Wadidi		Abdul Aziz Abdul Ghani	Zhao Ziyang		
January 1, 1985	Hussein Abdulkhalek Al-Galal		Abdul Aziz Abdul Ghani	Zhao Ziyang		
May 20, 1991	Ghaleb Saeed al-Adoofi		Haidar Abu Bakr al-Attas	Li Peng		
September 1, 1995	Mohammed Hadi Awad	born 5 May 1934 married one son, three	Abdul Aziz Abdul Ghani	Li Peng		
December 15, 2000	Abdulwahab Mohamed Al-Shawkani		Abd Al-Karim Al-Iryani	Zhu Rongji	January 1, 2004	
January 29, 2005	Marwan Abdullah Abdulwahab Noman		Abdul Qadir Bajamal	Wen Jiabao		
October 21, 2007	Abdul Malik al-Mo'alemi	Abdul-Malik al-Mu'alimi: In 2004 he was Minister of Telecommunication and Information Technology	Ali Muhammad Mujawar	Wen Jiabao	January 1, 2008	
December 19, 2016	Mohamed Othman Almekhlafi		Ahmed Obeid bin Daghr	Li Keqiang		

== South Yemen ==
- People's Democratic Republic (South Yemen)

== List of ambassadors ==
diplomatic agreement/designated	Diplomatic accreditation	ambassador	Observations	List of heads of government of Yemen	Premier of the People's Republic of China	Term end
February 2, 1968		The governments in Beijing and Aden established diplomatic relations.	Qahtan Muhammad al-Shaabi	Zhou Enlai		
February 2, 1968		No ambassador until 1973	Qahtan Muhammad al-Shaabi	Zhou Enlai	February 17, 1973	
February 17, 1973	Alwai Abdul Rahman al-Saqaff		Ali Nasir Muhammad	Zhou Enlai	November 29, 1975	
November 29, 1975	Ali Sal eh Moawad		Ali Nasir Muhammad	Zhou Enlai	August 6, 1978	
August 6, 1978	Ahmad Salih Hajib		Ali Nasir Muhammad	Hua Guofeng	January 1, 1980	
February 1, 1981	Yassin Ahmed Saleh		Ali Nasir Muhammad	Zhao Ziyang		
November 19, 1984	Ibrahim Abdulla Saidi		Ali Nasir Muhammad	Zhao Ziyang		
January 1, 1987	Ghaleb Saeed al-Adoofi		Yasin Said Numan	Li Peng		

== See also ==
- China–Yemen relations
