= 1967 North Yemen coup d'état =

Bloodless overthrow of President Abdullah al-Sallal

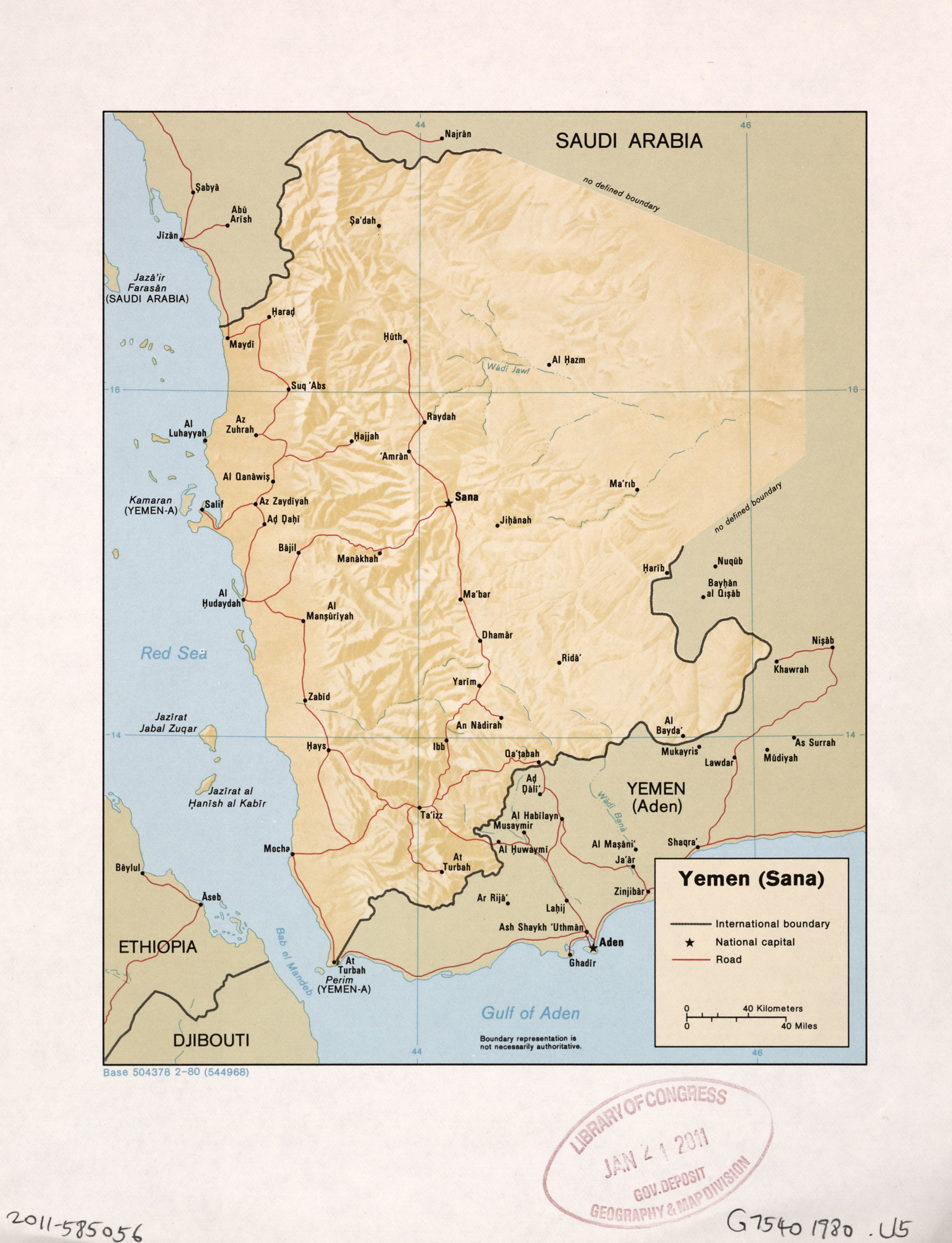
- Map of North Yemen
| Date | 5 November 1967 |
| Location | Sana'a, North Yemen |
| Result | Coup successful |

Belligerents
| Government of Yemen Arab Republic | (Yemen Arab Republic) Dissenting faction of the armed forces (Yemen Arab Republic) Tribal forces |

Commanders and leaders
| (Yemen Arab Republic) Abdullah al-Sallal | (Yemen Arab Republic) Abdul Rahman al-Eryani |

The 1967 North Yemen coup d'état was a bloodless overthrow of President Abdullah al-Sallal on November 5, 1967, in the Yemen Arab Republic. Yemeni dissidents and tribal forces carried out the coup, acting with the quiet approval of Sallal's main backer Nasserist Egypt.

This was due to a major shift in Egyptian foreign policy. Following the heavy defeat in the Six-Day War, Egyptian President Gamal Abdel Nasser lost much of his desire for costly foreign military adventures, including the war in North Yemen. Nasser announced plans to pull back from such commitments. In August 1967, Egypt and Saudi Arabia signed a peace agreement in Khartoum, requiring Egypt to completely withdraw its forces from Yemen. Egypt began pulling its troops out even before the agreement was fully implemented, completing the withdrawal by the end of the year. Reportedly, Nasser himself advised Sallal to step down and leave the country. When Sallal refused and instead flew to Baghdad seeking alternative support for his government, Nasser sent instructions to the remaining Egyptian troops in Yemen: they were not to intervene if the North Yemeni army moved against Sallal.

Seeing their chance, dissident groups and tribal militias moved tanks into the capital, Sana'a. They met no resistance and quickly took control of the Presidential Palace. A radio broadcast soon announced the coup's success, and Sallal asked for political asylum in Iraq.

Power shifted immediately to a three-person civilian leadership group called the Republican Council. Abdul Rahman al-Iryani became its chairman, joined by Ahmed Noman and Mohammad Ali Othman. Speaking for the new council, al-Iryani signaled a readiness to negotiate with the Royalist forces. As a show of goodwill, he pardoned over 3,000 political prisoners and called a conference of major Republican tribes to work towards ending the civil war, promising broader peace talks involving both sides.

However, Sallal's removal and Egypt's withdrawal encouraged royalist forces. They launched a major offensive and laid siege to Sana'a. Facing collapse, the new government secured decisive support from the Soviet Union. Bolstered by this aid, republican forces broke the siege by February 1968. This defeat shattered royalist hopes of a military victory.

Though sporadic fighting continued on for another two years, the lifting of the siege effectively marked the end of the civil war. By 1970, both sides signed a peace agreement agreeing to form a unified government with republican and royalist representation. The eight-year civil war was finally over.

== Background ==
The North Yemen Civil War began in 1962 when Egyptian-trained officers staged a military coup. They overthrew the Mutawakkilite Kingdom and declared the Yemen Arab Republic, installing Colonel Abdullah al-Sallal as president. The new republican government, heavily supported both militarily and politically by Egyptian President Gamal Abdel Nasser, fought against Royalist forces loyal to the deposed Imam Muhammad al-Badr, backed by Saudi Arabia, who would not stand for the removal of a monarchy on its southern border by Nasserist forces.

Egypt poured significant amounts of money, weapons, and eventually ground troops into North Yemen to support the Republican side. By 1965, roughly 60,000 Egyptian soldiers were involved in the fighting. This lengthy and expensive commitment which costed Egypt an estimated one million dollars per day became known as "Egypt's Vietnam." Many observers believed this drain on resources weakened Egypt and contributed to the Arab defeat in the 1967 Six-Day War.

Egypt's decisive loss in the Six-Day War marked a major turning point. Facing a serious military setback close to home, Nasser's government reassessed its priorities and largely lost its appetite for costly foreign ventures like the Yemen conflict. Nasser was also frustrated of propping up the unpopular Sallal, whose refusal to make peace with the Yemeni Royalists had cost him the support of even his own followers. Recognizing the need to pull back and cut its losses, Nasser announced Egypt's intention to withdraw its troops from North Yemen.

This eventually led to a peace agreement between Egypt and Saudi Arabia, reached during the Arab Summit in Khartoum in August 1967. The key terms were the complete withdrawal of all Egyptian military forces from North Yemen, an end to Saudi support for the Yemeni Royalists, and an agreement that Yemen's political future would be decided solely by the Yemeni people.

Demonstrating Egypt's eagerness to disengage, Nasser began pulling troops out even before the agreement was fully in effect. All Egyptian forces had left North Yemen by the end of 1967.

== Coup ==
The Egyptian withdrawal critically undermined the Sallal regime. While en route to Moscow, Sallal stopped in Cairo for a brief meeting with Gamal Abdel Nasser, reported to be tense. During this encounter, Nasser advised Sallal to resign and leave Yemen. Sallal refused the advice and instead flew to Baghdad in an attempt to secure support from other Arab socialist governments. Shortly after Sallal's departure from Cairo, Nasser cabled the remaining Egyptian military commanders in Sana'a, instructing them to not intervene in the event of a coup against Sallal.

With the regime's primary backer effectively giving tacit approval, Yemeni dissidents seized the opportunity. Supported by Republican tribesmen summoned to Sana'a, they deployed four tanks into the city's central squares and took control of the Presidential Palace. The takeover was announced matter-of-factly over government radio, stating Sallal had been removed "from all positions of authority." The coup was bloodless; no resistance was encountered, and no Yemenis rose to defend the deposed leader. Sallal requested for political asylum in Baghdad.

Power was immediately transferred to a three-member Republican Council, comprising moderate civilian leaders recently released after a year of political imprisonment in Cairo: former Premier Ahmed Mohammed Noman, former Acting President Abdul Rahman al-Iryani, and former Acting President Mohamed Ali al-Othman. These leaders represented a "third force" in Yemeni politics: a moderate nationalist faction opposing both continued Egyptian domination and the Royalist cause. Al-Iryani and Noman had briefly held power before, during Noman's premiership (April–July 1965), when their government attempted to reduce Egyptian influence by sending envoys to other Arab states for alternative support, initiating reconciliation talks with Royalist tribes, and attempting to create a "popular army" to replace Egyptian forces (then numbering over 50,000). Displeased with these efforts, Egypt reinstalled Sallal and imprisoned them. They were ultimately released following the August 1967 meeting in Khartoum.

Speaking for the triumvirate, Abdul Rahman al-Iryani declared the new regime's intention to negotiate with the Royalists. To advance reconciliation, he pardoned over 3,000 political prisoners and convened a conference of major Republican tribes in Sana'a to discuss ending the civil war. Iryani further pledged that this tribal conference would be followed by long-awaited peace talks, explicitly inviting Royalist representatives to participate.

== Aftermath ==
After Egypt pulled its troops out of North Yemen in late 1967 and President Sallal was overthrown, Royalist forces saw their chance. Backed by powerful tribes, they launched a major offensive aimed at retaking the capital and toppling the Republican regime. Facing collapse, the republican government urgently asked the Soviet Union for help.

The Soviets acted decisively. Starting a massive airlift operation, Soviet planes flew essential weapons, ammunition, and food directly into the besieged capital. Crucially, the Soviets did not just send supplies; they deployed their own pilots. Flying new MiG fighters, these pilots provided air cover for republican positions. This direct Soviet military intervention proved to be a decisive turning point. Combined with the arrival of reinforcements from southern nationalist groups and support from republican-aligned tribes, the defenders were able to hold out. After intense fighting, republican forces managed to break the siege by February 1968. While sporadic fighting continued for another two years, this victory effectively marked the end of the civil war.

By 1970, both sides agreed to a national reconciliation agreement. The agreement created a unified government with representation from both Republicans and Royalists. The North Yemen Civil War finally came to an end.
