= 1962 in North Yemen =

- Decades
- See also: Other events of 1962; Timeline of Yemeni history

The following lists events that happened during 1962 in the Yemen Arab Republic.

== Incumbents ==
- President: Abdullah as-Sallal (starting 28 September)
- Prime Minister: Abdullah as-Sallal (starting 28 September)

== Events ==
=== September ===
- September 25-26: 1962 Yemeni coup d'état
- September 27 - North Yemen declares its independence from the United Kingdom and becomes the Yemen Arab Republic.
