= Prime Minister of Mutawakkilite Kingdom of Yemen =

Prime Minister of the Mutawakkilite Kingdom of Yemen
- رئيس وزراء المملكة المتوكلية اليمنية (Arabic)
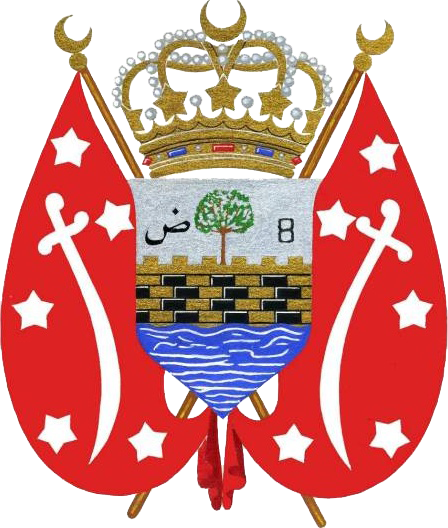
- Coat of arms of North Yemen
- Residence: Sana'a, Mutawakkilite Kingdom of Yemen
- Appointer: King of Yemen
- Formation: 1948
- First holder: Ali ibn Abdullah al-Wazir
- Final holder: Hassan ibn Yahya
- Abolished: 1970
- Succession: Prime Minister of Yemen Arab Republic

The Prime Minister of the Mutawakkilite Kingdom of Yemen was the head of government of that country in what is now northern Yemen. The Prime Minister was appointed by the King. There were seven prime ministers of North Yemen.

== See also ==
- Imams of Yemen
- List of heads of government of Yemen
