= Siege of Sanaa (1967) =

Part of the North Yemen Civil War

- Part of the North Yemen Civil War
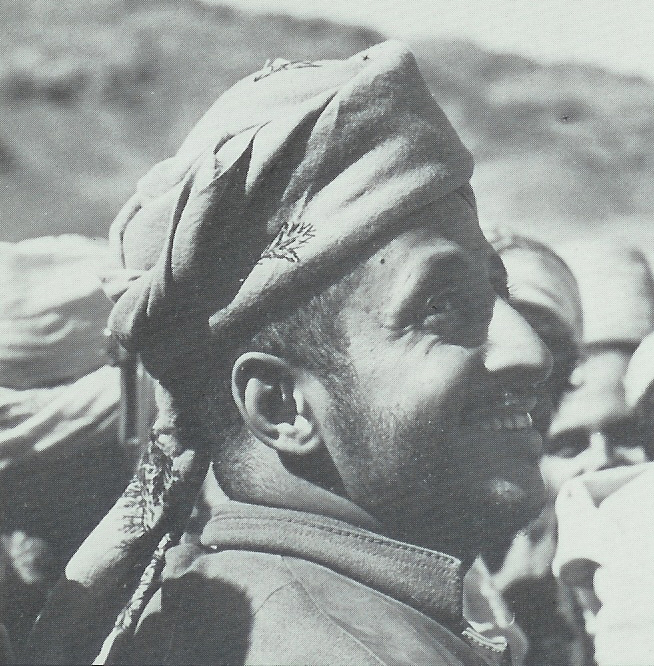
- Prince Mohamed bin Hussein in command of Royalist forces during the siege.
Date	28 November 1967 – 7 February 1968
Location	Sanaa, Yemen 15°21′N 44°12′E
Result	Republican victory

Belligerents
Mutawakkilite Kingdom of Yemen	(Yemen Arab Republic) Yemen Republic

Commanders and leaders
Mohamed bin Hussein	(Yemen Arab Republic) Hassan al-Amri

Strength
8,000 soldiers 50,000 tribesmen	(Yemen Arab Republic) 4,000 soldiers
- Location within Yemen

The siege of Sanaa, also known as the Seventy Day Siege (Arabic: حصار السبعين), took place between 28 November 1967 and 7 February 1968, during the North Yemen Civil War. The siege would become a critical battle to determine the outcome of the war and the eventual failure of the royalists to retake the city, the Republicans won a de facto tactical victory in the war, retaining the seat of power, and gradually winning international recognition as a legitimate North Yemen government.

== Background ==
On November 5, North Yemeni dissidents, supported by Republican tribesmen called down to Sanaa, moved four T-34 tanks into the city's dusty squares, took over the Presidential Palace and announced over the government radio station that Sallal had been removed "from all positions of authority". The coup went unopposed. In Baghdad, Sallal asked for political asylum, saying "every revolutionary must anticipate obstacles and difficult situations". The new republican government was headed by Qadi Abdul Rahman Iryani, Ahmad Muhammad Numan, and Mohamed Ali Uthman. The Prime Minister was Mohsin Ahmad al-Aini. Noman, however, remained in Beirut. He was doubtful of his colleagues reluctance to negotiate with the Hamidaddin family, preferring to expel it instead. On November 23, he resigned, and his place was taken by Hassan al-Amri.

== Siege ==
Prince Mohamed bin Hussein told the country's tribal chiefs "We have money, and you will have your share if you join us. If not, we will go on without you". The chiefs agreed to mobilize their tribes. On 28 November 1967, 6,000 royalist regulars and 50,000 armed tribesmen known as "the Fighting Rifles" surrounded Sanaa, captured its main airport and severed the highway to the port of Hodeida, a main route for Soviet supplies. In a battle twelve miles east of the capital, 3,200 soldiers from both sides were killed, and an entire republican regiment reportedly defected to the royalists. Bin Hussein gave them an ultimatum: "Surrender the city or be annihilated". Iryani went to Cairo for what the Egyptian official press agency called "a medical checkup". Foreign Minister Hassan Macky also left Yemen, leaving the government in charge of Hassan al-Amri. Amri declared a 6 p.m. curfew and ordered civilians to form militia units "to defend the republic". In Liberation Square, six suspected royalist infiltrators were publicly executed by a firing squad, and their bodies were later strung up on poles.

The republicans boasted a new air force, while the royalists claimed to have shot down a MiG-17 fighter jet with a Soviet pilot. The US State Department said that this claim, as well as reports of twenty-four MiGs and forty Soviet technicians and pilots who had arrived in Yemen, were correct. In January, the republicans were defending San'a with about 2,000 regulars and tribesmen, plus armed townsmen and about ten tanks. They also had the backing of a score or more fighter aircraft piloted by Soviet and Yemenis who had passed a crash course in the Soviet Union. The city could still feed itself from the immediately surrounding countryside. Between 4,000 and 5,000 royalists suffered from republican air power, but had the advantage of high ground. However, they did not have enough ammunition, as the Saudis had halted arms deliveries after the Khartoum agreement and stopped financing the royalists after December 1967.

By February 1968, the siege was lifted and the Republicans had essentially won the war. Meanwhile, the British had withdrawn from the Federation of South Arabia, which had now become South Yemen. The royalists remained active until 1970. Talks between the two sides commenced while the fighting went on. The Foreign Minister, Hassan Makki, said "Better years of talk than a day of fighting". In 1970, Saudi Arabia recognized the Republic, and a ceasefire was effected. The Saudis gave the republic a grant of $20 million, which was later repeated intermittently, and Yemeni sheikhs received Saudi stipends.
