= Abdur Rahman ibn Yahya =

Saif al-Islam Abdur Rahman ibn Yahya
- عبد الرحمن بن يحيى
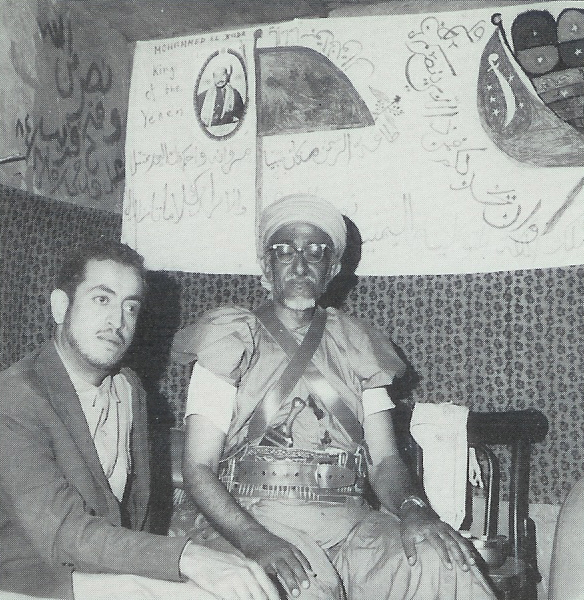

Prime Minister of the Mutawakkilite Kingdom of Yemen
- In office 11 April 1967 – 15 January 1969
- Monarch: Muhammad al-Badr (in exile)
- Preceded by: Hassan ibn Yahya
- Succeeded by: Hassan ibn Yahya

Personal details
- Born: 1937

Abdul Rahman bin Yahya (also known as Abdur Rahman bin Yahya) was a politician from Yemen who served as Head of Government of Yemen from 11 April 1967 to 15 January 1969 and Deputy Prime Minister of Yemen.
