= Minister of Foreign Affairs of South Yemen =

Government ministry of South Yemen

- Arabic: وزير خارجية اليمن الجنوبي
- Emblem (1970–90)

- Flag
- Incumbent; None
- Ministry of Foreign Affairs
- Status: Minister
- Member of: Government
- Reports to: The prime minister
- Seat: Aden
- Appointer: The president
- Term length: No fixed term
- Formation: 1967; 59 years ago
- First holder: Saif Ahmad al-Dali
- Final holder: Abdul Aziz al-Dali
- Abolished: 1990; 36 years ago

The minister of foreign affairs (Arabic: وزارة الخارجية) was a government minister in charge of the Ministry of Foreign Affairs of South Yemen (common name for the communist People's Democratic Republic of Yemen), in what is now southern Yemen. The minister was responsible for conducting foreign relations of the country.

== List of ministers ==
The following is a list of foreign ministers of South Yemen from 1967 until the unification in 1990:

Term	Name	Portrait
1967–1969	Saif Ahmad al-Dali	
1969	Faysal al-Shaabi	
1969–1971	Ali Salem al-Beidh	
1971	Muhammad Ali Haitham	
1971–1973	Muhammad Saleh al-Aulaqi	
1973–1979	Muhammad Saleh Muti	
1979–1982	Salim Saleh Muhammad	
1982–1990	Abdul Aziz al-Dali	

For ministers of foreign affairs of unified Yemen after 1990, see Ministry of Foreign Affairs and Expatriates (Yemen).

== See also ==
- Minister of Foreign Affairs of North Yemen
