= Prime Minister of the Yemen Arab Republic =

- رؤساء وزراء الجمهورية العربية اليمنية (Arabic)
- Coat of arms of North Yemen
- Residence: Sanaa, Yemen Arab Republic
- Appointer: President of Yemen Arab Republic
- Precursor: Prime Minister of Mutawakkilite Kingdom of Yemen
- Formation: 28 September 1962
- First holder: Abdullah al-Sallal
- Final holder: Abdul Aziz Abdul Ghani
- Abolished: 22 May 1990
- Succession: Prime Minister of Yemen

The Prime Minister of the Yemen Arab Republic, also known as the Chairman of the Council of Ministers of the Yemen Arab Republic, was the head of government of that country in what is now northern Yemen. The Prime Minister was appointed by the President. There were twelve prime ministers of North Yemen.

== List of prime ministers of the Yemen Arab Republic (1962–1990) ==
No.	Portrait	Name (Birth–Death)	Term start	Term end	Political party
1		Abdullah al-Sallal عبد الله السلال (1917–1994)	28 September 1962	26 April 1963	Military
2		Abdul Latif Dayfallah عبد اللطيف ضيف الله (1930–2019)	26 April 1963	5 October 1963	Military
3		Abdul Rahman al-Iryani عبد الرحمن الإرياني (1908–1998)	5 October 1963	10 February 1964	Independent
4		Hassan al-Amri حسن العمري (1920–1989)	10 February 1964	29 April 1964	Military
5		Hamoud al-Gayifi حمود الجائفي (1918–1985)	29 April 1964	6 January 1965	Independent
(4)		Hassan al-Amri حسن العمري (1920–1989)	6 January 1965	20 April 1965	Military
6		Ahmad Muhammad Numan أحمد محمد نعمان (1909–1996)	20 April 1965	6 July 1965	Independent
(1)		Abdullah al-Sallal عبد الله السلال (1917–1994)	6 July 1965	21 July 1965	Military
(4)		Hassan al-Amri حسن العمري (1920–1989)	21 July 1965	18 September 1966	Military
(1)		Abdullah al-Sallal عبد الله السلال (1917–1994)	18 September 1966	5 November 1967	Military
7		Mohsin Ahmad al-Aini محسن أحمد العيني (1932–2021)	5 November 1967	21 December 1967	Independent
(4)		Hassan al-Amri حسن العمري (1920–1989)	21 December 1967	9 July 1969	Military
—		Abdul Salam Sabrah عبد السلام صبره (1912–2012); Acting Prime Minister	9 July 1969	29 July 1969	Independent
(7)		Mohsin Ahmad al-Aini محسن أحمد العيني (1932–2021)	29 July 1969	2 September 1969	Independent
8		Abdullah Kurshumi عبد الله كرشمي (1932–2007)	2 September 1969	5 February 1970	Independent
(7)		Mohsin Ahmad al-Aini محسن أحمد العيني (1932–2021)	5 February 1970	26 February 1971	Independent
—		Abdul Salam Sabrah عبد السلام صبره (1912–2012); Acting Prime Minister	26 February 1971	3 May 1971	Independent
(6)		Ahmad Muhammad Numan أحمد محمد نعمان (1909–1996)	3 May 1971	24 August 1971	Independent
(4)		Hassan al-Amri حسن العمري (1920–1989)	24 August 1971	5 September 1971	Military
—		Abdul Salam Sabrah عبد السلام صبره (1912–2012); Acting Prime Minister	5 September 1971	18 September 1971	Independent
(7)		Mohsin Ahmad al-Aini محسن أحمد العيني (1932–2021)	18 September 1971	30 December 1972	Independent
9		Kadhi Abdullah al-Hagri القاضي عبدالله الحجري (1911–1977)	30 December 1972	10 February 1974	Independent
10		Hassan Muhammad Makki حسن محمد مكي (1933–2016)	10 February 1974	22 June 1974	Independent
(7)		Mohsin Ahmad al-Aini محسن أحمد العيني (1932–2021)	22 June 1974	16 January 1975	Independent
—		Abdul Latif Dayfallah عبد اللطيف ضيف الله (1930–2019); Acting Prime Minister	16 January 1975	25 January 1975	Military
11		Abdul Aziz Abdul Ghani عبد العزيز عبد الغني (1939–2011)	25 January 1975	15 October 1980	Independent
12		Abd Al-Karim Al-Iryani عبد الكريم علي يحي محمدعبد ألله الإرياني (1934–2015)	15 October 1980	24 August 1982	Independent
(12)		Abd Al-Karim Al-Iryani عبد الكريم علي يحي محمدعبد ألله الإرياني (1934–2015)	24 August 1982	13 November 1983	General People's Congress
(11)		Abdul Aziz Abdul Ghani عبد العزيز عبد الغني (1939–2011)	13 November 1983	22 May 1990	General People's Congress

For prime ministers of Yemen after 1990, see Prime Minister of Yemen.

== See also ==
- Imams of Yemen
- President of Yemen Arab Republic
- List of heads of government of Yemen
- List of leaders of South Yemen
