= Mutaher al-Eryani =

Yemeni poet, historian and archeologist (1933–2016)

Mutaher Ali Al-Eryani
- مطهر بن علي الإرياني
- Born: 1933; Al Qafr, Ibb Governorate, Kingdom of Yemen
- Died: February 9, 2016 (aged 82–83)
- Education: Cairo University
- Occupations: Poet, historian, linguist, and archeologist
- Relatives: Abd Al-Karim Al-Iryani (brother)

Mutaher Ali Al-Eryani (Arabic: مطهر علي الإرياني; 1933 – 9 February 2016) was a popular Yemeni poet, archeologist, historian and linguist. He was famous as a creative poet and considered one of the most celebrated historians and intellectuals in Yemen. He has been called the "poet of Yemeni earth".

== Life and career ==
Mutaher was born in 1933 in Al Qafr, Ibb governorate. He was first educated by his elder brother Fadhel and in 1953 he moved to Aden and then to Cairo. In 1955 he joined Faculty of Dar Al-Ulum, Cairo University, and graduated in 1959. Al-Eryani studied and conducted research into the Ancient South Arabian script (Musnad) and managed to decipher dozens of ancient inscriptions about history of Yemen. He started his career in poetry at an early age and his first poem was at the age of 14. He also authored several literary, historical books, including "Musnad Inscriptions and Comments", in which he decoded old inscriptions written in Yemen's old alphabetical letters known as Al-Musnad. "The Dictionary of Yemeni language" is another important book which included thousands of vocabulary of different Yemeni dialects.

== Famous works ==
=== Poetry in Arabic ===
- Glory and Pain, 1967 (المجد والألم)
- Above the Mountain, 1991 (فوق الجبل)

==== Lyric poetry ====
Al-Eryani wrote the lyrics of many songs related to patriotism, love, agriculture, farmers, beauty and history of Yemen which have been sung by famous Yemeni singers.

- Love and Coffee, (الحب والبن)
- Goodbye, (الوداع)
- We came to salute you, (جينا نحييكم)
- Al-Balh, (البالة)
- Let's sing for Seasons, (هيا نغني للمواسم)
- Wadi Sheba Dam, (سد وادي سبأ)
- A Voice Came from Sheba, (صوت جاء من سبأ)
- What a Beautiful Morning, (ما أجمل الصبح)

== Death ==
Al-Eryani died on 9 February 2016, at the age of 84 years.
