= Abdulwahab al-Rawhani =

Yemeni politician and diplomat

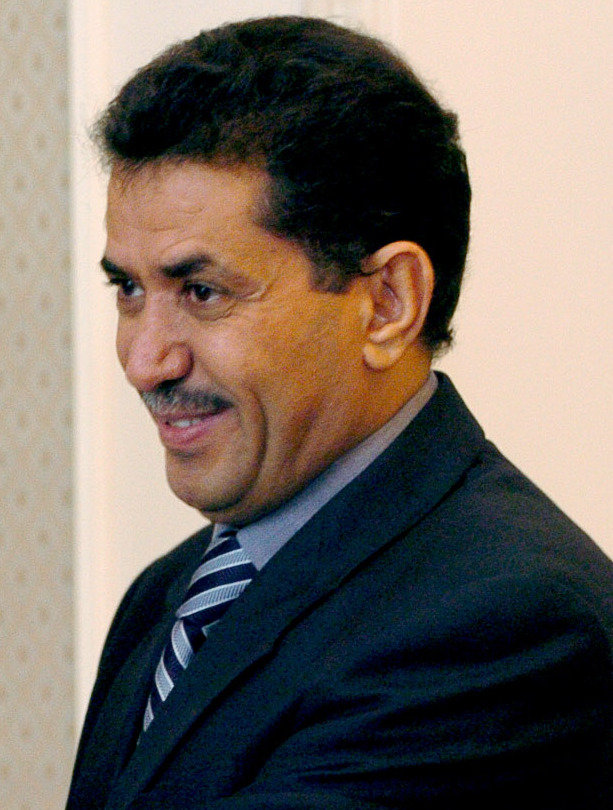
On 20 July 2004

Abdulwahab M. Al-Rawhani (Arabic: عبد الوهاب الروحاني) is a Yemeni politician and diplomat. He quit his position as minister of culture over the Yemeni revolution. He was born in 1958 in Rawhan village, Yemen Republic.

== Political career ==
- 2008 – 00: Member of the Shura Council (second parliament chamber), Sana’a, Yemen.
- 2003 – 2007: Yemeni ambassador to Russia.
- 2001 – 2003: Minister of culture.
- 1993 – 2003: Member of the Yemeni Parliament for two consecutive terms where he was a member of the Human right committee and chairman of culture, information committee in the parliament. During this period he was one of few members who adopted the movement to ban the marriage of minors under 18 years. This issue is still debated in Yemen up to date.

== Education ==
- 2007: PhD in Political science, Diplomatic Academy, Moscow, Russia
- 1986–1987: Diploma in management administration, Yemeni National Management Institute, Sana’a, Yemen.
- 1979–1985: Master's degree in Journalism, State University of the Republic of Belarus, Minsk, Belarus.

== Journalism career ==
- 2014–2015: Political writer for Asharq Al-Awsat (widest spread newspaper in the middle-east, UK).
- 1991–1997: Founder and chief-editor of the "22nd of May" newspaper.
- 1990–1991: Founder and chief editor of "Al-Wahda newspaper". This is one of the state own newspapers.
- 1987–1990: Political editor of the main state newspaper "Al-Thawra newspaper" in Yemen.
- 1986–1991: News and political correspondents for some international news journals and papers namely: "Alyoum Alsabea" Paris-France, "Alkhaleej" Alsharjah -UAE.
- 2008 – 2012: Professor of journalism studies at the University of Sana’a ( main state University), Sana’a, Yemen, where he tough the following subjects:

== Awards ==
- Presidential certificate of appreciation, awarded by the president of Yemen for his pioneering work on journalism, Sana’a, Yemen, 2010.
- First class Gorchkov award, awarded by the Russian national awards committee, for his contribution on affirming relations between the republic of Yemen and Russia, Moscow, Russia, 2007.

== Publications ==
- Yemen: a special case of unity and ruling method, Madbouly books, Cairo, Egypt, 2008.
- Street talks in Yemen: Selected articles from the 80's and 90's, Ministry of culture, Sana’a, Yemen, 2010.
- National dialogue: Towards a Yemeni modern civil state, Ministry of culture, Sana’a, Yemen, 2012.
