= Ahmad al-Sayari =

Yemeni politician

Ahmad al-Sayari (born 1924) was a politician from Mutawakkilite Kingdom who served as Head of Government of Yemen from 5 October 1962 to 17 October 1962.
