= Ageel bin Muhammad al-Badr =

Ageel bin Muhammad al-Badr: عقيل بن محمد البدر
- Saif al-Islam

Head of the royal house of Yemen
- Tenure: 6 August 1996 – present
- Predecessor: Muhammad al-Badr
- Born: 1973 (age 52–53); London, England, UK
- Issue: Muhammad Al-Hassan bin 'Ageel Hamidaddin
- House: Rassids
- Father: Muhammad al-Badr
- Mother: a daughter of Yahya Al-Hirsi Al-Ban
- Religion: Zaidi Shia Islam

Prince Ageel bin Muhammad al-Badr Hamidaddin (Arabic: عقيل بن محمد البدر حميد الدين; born 1973) is the eldest son of Muhammad al-Badr, the last ruling king of The Mutawakkilite Kingdom of Yemen.

== Biography ==
Yemen became a republic following the overthrow of the monarchy in 1962. Since the death of his father in 1996, Ageel bin Muhammad has been the head of the royal Hamid ad-Din lineage. He uses the title Saif al-Islam ("Sword of Islam"), which had been carried by the Crown Princes of Yemen.

Ageel bin Muhammed has two sons: Muhammad Al-Hassan bin 'Ageel Hamidaddin and Ahmed bin 'Ageel Al-Badr.

== See also ==
- 2014–15 Yemeni coup d'état

Ageel bin Muhammad al-Badr Rassids Born: 1973
Titles in pretence
| Preceded by Muhammad al-Badr | — TITULAR — King of Yemen; 6 August 1996 – present Reason for succession failure: Monarchy deposed in 1962 | Incumbent |
