= Abdul Latif Dayfallah =

Yemeni military officer and politician (1928–2019)

- عبد اللطيف ضيف الله
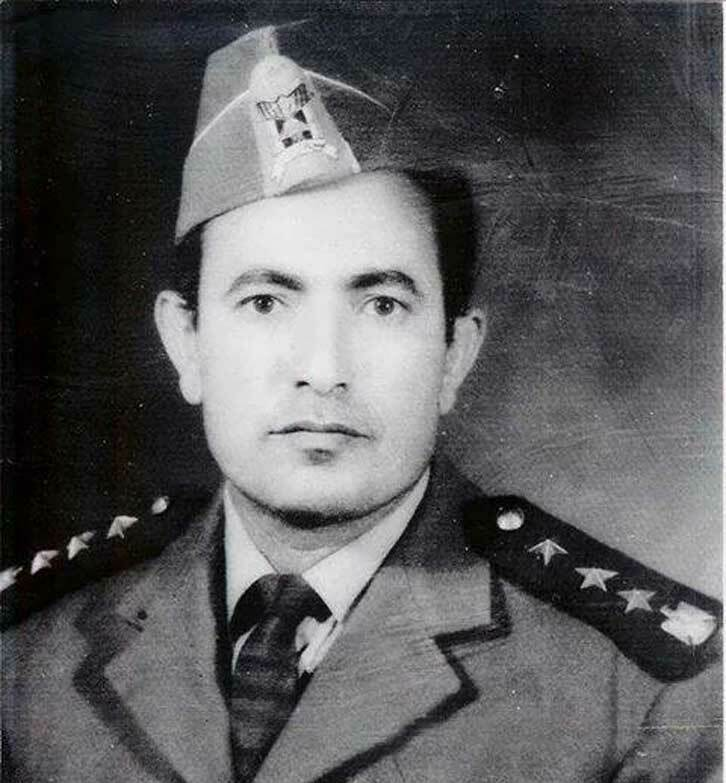

Prime Minister of the Yemen Arab Republic
- In office 26 April 1963 – 5 October 1963
- President: Abdullah al-Sallal

Personal details
- Born: 1930 Sana'a
- Died: 27 March 2019 (aged 88–89)

Military service
- Allegiance: Kingdom of Yemen (1956–1962) (Yemen Arab Republic) North Yemen (1962–1970)
- Years of service: 1956–1970
- Rank: Major General
- Battles/wars: North Yemen Civil War; Siege of Sana'a

Abdul Latif Dayfallah (Arabic: عبد اللطيف ضيف الله; 1930 - March 27, 2019) was a Yemeni military officer and politician who served as the Prime Minister of the Yemen Arab Republic during the North Yemen Civil War. He joined the North Yemeni Army in the 1950s and received military training at the Egyptian Military Academy in Cairo where he acquired Nasserist sympathies. At the time of the September 1962 coup, he held the rank of Major General and served as Director of Signals in the Yemeni military. He held several ministerial posts, such as minister of interior and minister of finance. He lived in Lebanon from 1966 to 1967. Dayfallah also served as acting prime minister for nine days in January 1975. Dayfallah died in March 2019 at the age of 89.

Political offices
Preceded by Abdullah as-Sallal	Prime Minister of Yemen Arab Republic; 1963	Succeeded by Abdul Rahman al-Iryani
Preceded by Mohsin Ahmad al-Aini	Prime Minister of Yemen Arab Republic; 1975 (acting)	Succeeded by Abdul Aziz Abdul Ghani
