= Huang Shixie =

Chinese ambassador (1920-2012)

- 黄世燮

Chinese Ambassador to Rwanda
- In office June 1972 – August 1977
- Succeeded by: Yue Liang; Zhao Jin (PRC ambassador)

Chinese Ambassador to Yemen (South Yemen)
- In office August 1977 – November 1981
- Preceded by: Cui Jian (PRC ambassador) 崔健
- Succeeded by: Tang Yong 唐涌

Chinese Ambassador to Jordan
- In office June 1982 – May 1985
- Preceded by: Gu Xiaobo
- Succeeded by: Zhang Zhen (diplomat, born 1936)

Personal details
- Born: 1920
- Died: November 11, 2012 (aged 91–92)

Huang Shixie (1920 – November 11, 2012) was a Chinese ambassador.

- From June 1972 to August 1977 was ambassador in Kigali (Rwanda).
- From August 1977 to November 1981 was ambassador in Aden (South Yemen).
- From June 1982 to May 1985 he was ambassador to Amman (Jordan).
