= Abdul Salam Sabrah =

North Yemeni politician (1912–2012)

Prime Minister of the Yemen Arab Republic
- Acting
- In office 5 September 1971 – 18 September 1971
- President: Abdul Rahman al-Eryani
- Preceded by: Hassan al-Amri
- Succeeded by: Mohsin Ahmad al-Aini
- In office 27 February 1971 – 3 May 1971
- President: Abdul Rahman al-Eryani
- Preceded by: Moshin Ahmad al-Aini
- Succeeded by: Ahmad Muhammad Numan
- In office 9 July 1969 – 29 July 1969
- President: Abdul Rahman al-Eryani
- Preceded by: Hassan al-Amri
- Succeeded by: Moshin Ahmad al-Aini

Personal details
- Born: 1 January 1912
- Died: 2 February 2012 (aged 100)

Abdul Salam Sabrah (Arabic: عبد السلام صبره) (1 January 1912 – 2 February 2012) was the acting Prime Minister of the Yemen Arab Republic three times. His first term was in 1969, from 9 July to 29 July. His second and third terms were both in 1971, from 26 February to 3 May and from 5 September to 18 September. All three terms were under President Abdul Rahman al-Iryani. He died on 2 February 2012 at the age of 100.

Political offices
Preceded by Hassan al-Amri	Prime Minister of Yemen Arab Republic; 1969 (acting)	Succeeded by Mohsin Ahmad al-Aini
Preceded by Mohsin Ahmad al-Aini	Prime Minister of Yemen Arab Republic; 1971 (acting)	Succeeded by Ahmad Muhammad Numan
Preceded by Hassan al-Amri	Prime Minister of Yemen Arab Republic; 1971 (acting)	Succeeded by Mohsin Ahmad al-Aini
