= Abdullah Kurshumi =

Prime Minister of North Yemen (1932–2007)

Abduallah Hussein Alkorshomi (Arabic: عبد الله كرشمي) was the Prime Minister of the Yemen Arab Republic from 2 September 1969 until 5 February 1970. He served under President Abdul Rahman al-Iryani.

He was born in 1932 in the village of Bayt Baws in Bani Matar District in Sanaa Governorate. He died July 26, 2007, and was buried in the Bayt Baws Graveyard.

Preceded by Mohsin Ahmad al-Aini	Prime Minister of North Yemen; 1969–1970	Succeeded by Mohsin Ahmad al-Aini
