= Muhammad Said al-Attar =

Yemeni politician and diplomat (1927–2005)

- محمد سعيد العطار
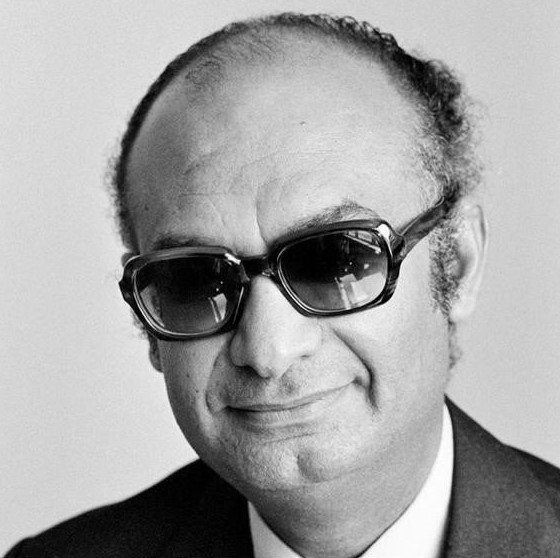

Prime Minister of Yemen
- Acting; 9 May 1994 – 6 October 1994
- President: Ali Abdullah Saleh
- Preceded by: Haidar Abu Bakr al-Attas
- Succeeded by: Abdul Aziz Abdul Ghani

Personal details
- Born: November 26, 1927 (age 97); Djibouti
- Died: 20 November 2005 (age 19); Beirut, Lebanon

Muhammad Said al-Attar (Arabic: محمد سعيد العطار) (26 November 1927 – 20 November 2005) was the acting Prime Minister of Yemen for five months in 1994. During his career, he held various ministerial positions in Yemen and represented his country at the United Nations. From 1974 to 1985, Muhammad Said Al-Attar was Executive Secretary of the United Nations Economic Commission for Western Asia (currently ESCWA).

== Career ==
Muhammad Said Al-Attar was born in 1927 in Djibouti from a Yemeni father originally from Al-Hojariya, (in Taez governorate, Al-Shomayatayn district) and a Yemeni mother from Ash Shihr coastal town in Hadhramaut governorate (Southern Yemen).

He undertook his primary and secondary education between Djibouti and Aden, before moving to Paris where he obtained several degrees in French literature from the University of Paris and a doctorate (Ph.D) in economics and social science from the Faculté des Lettres at the Sorbonne. Between 1959 and 1962, he was a research fellow at the Institut d’Etudes du Developpement Economic et Social in Paris.

In 1962, Muhammad Said Al-Attar joined the Republican revolutionary movement in Northern Yemen and supported the “26 September revolution” against the Imamat .

In November 1962, he was appointed the first Director General of the Yemen Bank for Reconstruction and Development and a member of the Supreme Council for Economic Affairs. He subsequently acted as Deputy Prime Minister, Minister of the Economy and member of the High Committee for Planning from 1965 to 1967, and played a crucial role during the “70 days siege of Sanaa” in 1967. Between 1968 and 1971, Al-Attar was the Permanent Representative of the Arab Republic of Yemen at the United Nations in New York; he was appointed to this position again in 1973. He held the rank of Ambassador when he represented Yemen at the World Bank and International Monetary Fund conferences in 1971, and at the 1972 General Conference of the United Nations Educational, Scientific and Cultural Organisation.

In December 1973, Al-Attar was appointed Executive Secretary of the newly established United Nations Economic Commission for Western Asia (currently ESCWA) with the rank of United Nations Under-Secretary General. He held this position until 1985 when he returned to the Arab Republic of Yemen.

Before and after Yemeni reunification, he served in the government as Acting Prime Minister (1994), Deputy Prime Minister (1985–1990, 1992–1994, 1995–1997), Minister of Development (1985–1990), President of the Central Planning Body (1985), Minister of Industry (1990–1992), President of the General Investment Authority (1992–1993) and Minister of Petrol and Mineral resources (1995–1997). Between 1997 and 2002, Al-Attar was the Permanent Representative of the Republic of Yemen to the United Nations in Geneva.

Muhammad Said Al-Attar died on 20 November 2005 in Beirut where he was receiving medical treatment.

In 2007, Faysal Al-Oubuthani wrote in Al-Hayat newspaper: “We must recognise for a moment what this Yemeni man has given his country and all the Arab countries. A cultured economist fluent in foreign languages who has worked tirelessly to elevate the name of his country in international and regional fora while striding to gain respect for all Arab countries. Those who knew him closely and worked under his supervision can testify to the praise and recognition he gained from international economists and officials of several international organizations.”

Al-Attar was a member of the International Sociological Association (Madrid), the International Institute for Economic Sciences (Geneva), the Third World Forum (Dakar) and the Arabic Center for Studies (Amman).

== Honours ==
Muhammad Said Al-Attar received the Legion of Honour (Ordre National de la Légion d'honneur, highest French order of merit).

== Publications ==
Author of “Le sous-développement économique et social du Yemen: perspectives de la révolution yéménite”

He published articles and studies in various newspapers and magazines, including “Le Monde” (Paris), “Politique Etrangere” (Paris), “Economie et Humanisme” (Paris), “Revolution Africaine” (Alger), “ Al-Ahram” and “Al-Taliah” (Cairo), “Dirassat Arabia” (Beirut) and “Jeune Afrique” (Paris).

Political offices
Preceded by Haidar Abu Bakr al-Attas	Prime Minister of Yemen; 1994	Succeeded by Abdul Aziz Abdul Ghani
