= Mohamed Saleh Al-Helali =

Yemeni diplomat

Dr. Mohammed Saleh Ahmed Al-Helali is a Yemeni diplomat. From 27 September 2007 to 21 August 2017, he was the Yemeni ambassador to Russia. During this time, he was also cross-accredited to Ukraine.
