= Hamoud Al-Jaifi =

Yemeni politician (1918–1985)

- حمود الجائفي
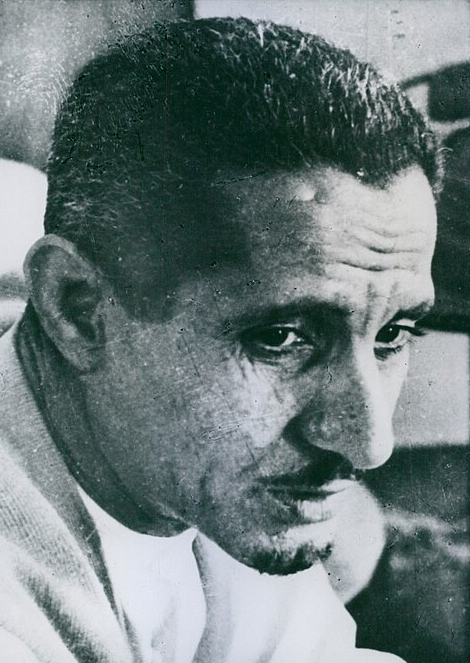

Minister of War
- In office 1962
- President: Abdullah al-Sallal

Ambassador of Yemen Arab Republic to United Arab Republic
- In office 1963
- President: Abdullah al-Sallal

Prime Minister of Yemen Arab Republic
- In office 1964
- President: Abdullah al-Sallal
- Preceded by: Hassan al-Amri
- Succeeded by: Hassan al-Amri

Personal details
- Born: 1918 Hamdan District, Sanaa, North Yemen
- Died: 22 March 1985 (aged 67) Cairo, Egypt

Military service
- Allegiance: North Yemen
- Branch/service: North Yemeni Army
- Rank: Major General

Hamoud Al-Jaifi (Arabic: حمود الجائفي) (1918 – 22 March 1985) was a Yemeni politician, diplomat and military officer. He served as Prime Minister of the Yemen Arab Republic from 29 April 1964 to 6 January 1965, under President Abdullah as-Sallal.

== Biography ==
Al-Jaifi was born in 1918 in Wadi Dhahr village in Hamdan, Sana'a. He grew up and studied basic education in Sana'a. In 1935 he join Iraq Military Academy and graduated in 1937. After the Nasserist-inspired military coup of 1962, he held many positions, including the Minister of War in 1962, ambassador of Yemen Arab Republic to United Arab Republic in 1963, Prime Minister in 1964, the Minister of Economy and Treasure, the head of National Defense Council in 1965, and then the Minister of War in 1966.

== Literature ==
- Robin Leonard Bidwell: Dictionary of Modern Arab History, page 209. Routledge, New York 2010

Preceded by Hassan al-Amri	Prime Minister of Yemen Arab Republic; 1964–1965	Succeeded by Hassan al-Amri
