= Faraj Said Bin Ghanem =

Prime Minister of Yemen from 1997 to 1998

- فرج سعيد بن غانم

3rd Prime Minister of Yemen
- In office 15 May 1997 – 29 ِ April 1998
- President: Ali Abdullah Saleh
- Preceded by: Abdul Aziz Abdul Ghani
- Succeeded by: Abd Al-Karim Al-Iryani

Personal details
- Born: 1 December 1937 Ghayl Ba Wazir
- Died: 5 August 2007 (aged 69)

Faraj Said Bin Ghanem (Arabic: فرج سعيد بن غانم; 1 December 1937 – 5 August 2007) was the prime minister of Yemen from 17 May 1997 to 29 April 1998.

== Early life and education ==
Born in Ghail Bawazir, Hadramout Governorate, on December 1, 1937. He received his primary and medium education in Gail Bawazir and continued secondary education in Sudan. He got a bachelor's degree in economy from the University of Khartoum, Sudan, in 1964. Then he obtained a master's degree at the Central School of Planning and Statistics in Warsaw- Poland- in 1975. He had a doctorate in statistics from Poland in 1978.

Political offices
| Preceded by Abdul Aziz Abdul Ghani | Prime Minister of Yemen; 1997–1998 | Succeeded by Abd Al-Karim Al-Iryani |
