= Hassan Muhammad Makki =

Yemeni politician (1933–2016)

Hassan Muhammad Makki (Arabic: حسن محمد مكي; 22 December 1933 – 9 June 2016) was the Prime Minister of the Yemen Arab Republic for four months in 1974. Makki was appointed by President Abdul Rahman al-Iryani. He was replaced shortly after the coup d'état that placed Ibrahim al-Hamdi in power as Chairman of the Military Command Council.

Before and after his term as the Prime Minister he served as Deputy Prime Minister, Minister for Foreign Affairs or Minister for Economical Affairs several times between 1963 and 1980. He also has been sent as ambassador to Italy (1968–70, 1977–79), Western Germany (1970–72), to the United Nations (1974–76) and to the United States and Canada (1975–1976). Makki died on 9 June 2016, aged 82.

== Literature ==
- Robert D. Burrowes: Historical Dictionary of Yemen, page 231f. Lanham 2010
- The International Who's Who 1988-89, page 972. Europa Plublications Limited, London 1988
- Sabih M. Shukri (publ.): The International Who's Who of the Arab World, page 338. London 1983

Political offices
Preceded by Kadhi Abdullah al-Hagri	Prime Minister of North Yemen; 1974	Succeeded by Mohsin Ahmad al-Aini
