= Hassan al-Amri =

Prime Minister of North Yemen (1920–1988/89)

- حسن العمري
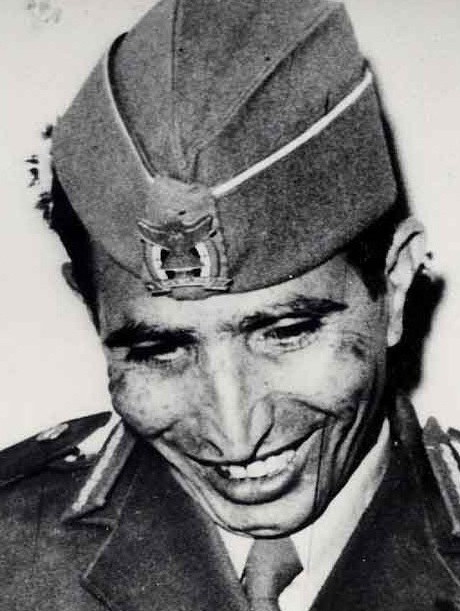
- Hassan al-Amri in 1965

Prime Minister of Yemen Arab Republic
- In office 10 February 1964 – 29 April 1964
- President: Abdullah as-Sallal
- Preceded by: Abdul Rahman al-Eryani
- Succeeded by: Hamoud Al-Jaifi

Prime Minister of Yemen Arab Republic
- In office 6 January 1965 – 20 April 1965
- Preceded by: Hamoud Al-Jaifi
- Succeeded by: Ahmad Muhammad Numan

Prime Minister of Yemen Arab Republic
- In office 21 July 1965 – 18 September 1966
- Preceded by: Abdullah as-Sallal
- Succeeded by: Abdullah as-Sallal

Personal details
- Born: 1920 Al-Amaryah village, Sanaa, North Yemen
- Died: 7 April 1989 (aged 68–69) Cologne, West Germany (present-day Germany)
- Education: Iraqi Military Academy

Military service
- Allegiance: North Yemen
- Branch/service: North Yemeni Army
- Years of service: 1936–1948; 1962–1970
- Rank: Lieutenant General
- Battles/wars: Alwaziri coup; North Yemen Civil War

Hassan al-Amri (Arabic: حسن العمري; 1920 – 7 April 1989) was a Yemeni military officer and politician who served as the Prime Minister of the Yemen Arab Republic (North Yemen) for five terms between 1964 and 1971. He was popularly known as The General of Yemen for his role in the North Yemen Civil War.

== Early life and military career ==
He was from the first batch to study in Iraq's War College in 1936.

He participated in the Alwaziri coup in 1948 against Imam Yahya, which failed and he was jailed for 7 years in the Hajja prison in Yemen, and then participated in the North Yemen Civil War against the royalists led by Muhammad al Badr.

== Political career ==
Al-Amri's first three terms were served under President Abdullah as-Sallal. The dates of these terms were: (his positions were, a prime minister, a Commander in Chief of the armed forces and a vice president)

- 10 February to 29 April 1964
- 6 January to 20 April 1965
- 21 July 1965 to 18 September 1966

His final two terms were under President Abdul Rahman al-Iryani. (Member of the Republican)

- 21 December 1967 to 9 July 1969
- 24 August to 5 September 1971

Preceded by Abdul Rahman al-Iryani	Prime Minister of Yemen Arab Republic; 1964	Succeeded by Mahmoud al-Gayifi
Preceded by Hamoud al-Gayifi	Prime Minister of Yemen Arab Republic; 1965	Succeeded by Ahmad Muhammad Numan
Preceded by Abdullah as-Sallal	Prime Minister of Yemen Arab Republic; 1965–1966	Succeeded by Abdullah as-Sallal
Preceded by Mohsin Ahmad al-Aini	Prime Minister of Yemen Arab Republic; 1967–1969	Succeeded by Abdul Salam Sabrah (acting)
Preceded by Ahmad Muhammad Numan	Prime Minister of Yemen Arab Republic; 1971	Succeeded by Abdul Salam Sabrah (acting)
