= Muhammad al-Badr =

King and Imam of Yemen (1926–1996)

Muhammad al-Badr محمد البدر
- Imam and Commander of the Faithful and King of the Mutawakkilite Kingdom of Yemen
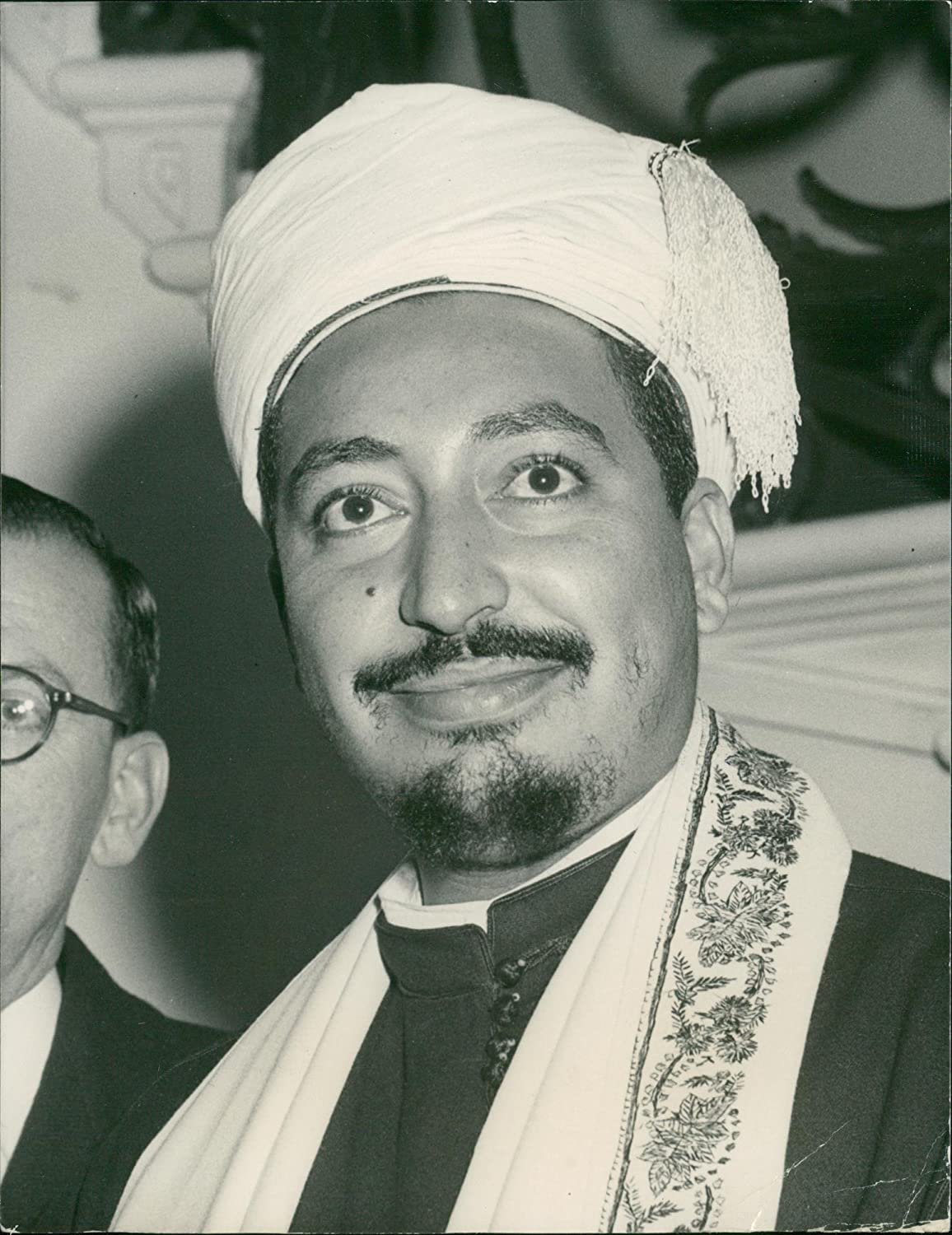
- Al-Badr in 1962

King and Imam of Yemen
- Reign: 26 September 1962 – 1 December 1970 (Note: In exile during the North Yemen Civil War, in northern Yemen between September 1962 and March 1969 and in Ta'if, Saudi Arabia, between March 1969 and 1 December 1970)
- Predecessor: Ahmad bin Yahya
- Successor: Title abolished (Abdullah al-Sallal as President of the Yemen Arab Republic (Note: al-Badr did not formally abdicate until 1 December 1970, at which point Abdul Rahman al-Eryani was President of the Yemen Arab Republic))
- Born: Al-Mansur Bi'llah Muhammad Al-Badr bin Al-Nasir-li-dinu'llah Ahmad; 15 February 1926; Sanaa, Kingdom of Yemen
- Died: 6 August 1996 (aged 70); London, United Kingdom
- Burial: Medina, Saudi Arabia
- Issue: Ageel bin Muhammad al-Badr; Muhammad bin Muhammad al-Badr
- House: Rassids
- Father: Ahmad bin Yahya
- Religion: Zaydi Shia Islam

Muhammad al-Badr (Note: Arabic: محمد البدر. His full name was Al-Mansur Bi'llah Muhammad Al-Badr bin Al-Nasir-li-dinu'llah Ahmad (Arabic: المنصور بالله محمد البدر بن أحمد)) (15 February 1926 – 6 August 1996) was the last king and Zaydi Imam of the Mutawakkilite Kingdom of Yemen (North Yemen) and leader of the monarchist regions during the North Yemen Civil War (1962–1970).

He was Imam and Commander of the Faithful and King of the Mutawakkilite Kingdom of Yemen.

== Biography ==
=== Early life and education ===
Al-Badr was born in 1926 or 1929 as oldest son of Ahmad bin Yahya, later imam of the Zaydis and king of North Yemen. In 1944 he moved to Taizz in the south of the country, where his father had already been the Imam's deputy for several years, to continue his education. Soon after the assassination of Imam Yahya in February 1948 plotted by Sayyid Abdullah al-Wazir, al-Badr arrived in Sanaa, the capital, but apparently only gave tacit support to the new regime. Meanwhile, Sayf al-Islam Ahmad had managed to get away from Taizz and made for Hajjah, where he gathered the tribes around him, proclaimed himself Imam with the title of al-Nasir and within a month of the assassination had easily regained control of Sanaa and executed the principal perpetrators of the rebellion.

=== Rise to power ===
Sayf al-Islam al-Badr (as Muhammad now became), not yet 24, was clearly able to patch up speedily any misunderstandings with his father, for in late 1949 he was appointed his deputy over Hodeida, the important port on the Red Sea. He was also made Minister of the Interior.

Al-Badr played a prominent role in quelling the revolt against his father, Imam Ahmad, in 1955 led by Ahmad's brother Sayf al-Islam Abdullah and afterwards was declared Crown Prince.

=== Foreign policy ===
In that same year Ahmad bin Yahya forged connections and signed agreements during a tour to Soviet bloc countries. In April 1956 he signed a mutual defence pact with Egypt, involving a unified military command, and in 1958 incorporated Yemen with the United Arab Republic of Egypt and Syria into what then became the United Arab States.

During the remaining period of Imam Ahmad's rule, Sayf al-Islam al-Badr held the post of Minister of Foreign Affairs and from 1958 he was also the Imam's deputy over Sanaa.

==== Federation with Egypt (1958) ====
On 8 March 1958, Nasser and Prince Muhammad al-Badr signed a pact in Syria creating the United Arab States, a federation linking Yemen with the United Arab Republic (Egypt and Syria). Yemen retained its independence and the ability to act against Egypt in foreign policy. Field Marshal Abdul Hakim Amer was appointed commander-in-chief of the federation's joint forces.

=== Acting ruler and accession ===
Like most young Arab leaders of his generation, Al-Badr had been a great admirer of the Egyptian President Gamal Abdel Nasser. So in 1959 while he was in charge of Yemen for a few months during Imam Ahmad's absence in Italy for medical treatment, he arranged for Egyptian experts to come and help modernize Yemen in all fields, including the military. His father annulled these upon his return.

An assassination attempt on the life of Imam Ahmad in March 1961 left the latter gravely crippled, so in October Sayf al-Islam al-Badr took over effective control of the government. On 19 September 1962 Ahmad died in his sleep, al-Badr was proclaimed Imam and King and took the title of al-Mansur.

== Overthrow and civil war ==
A week later rebels shelled his residence, Dar al-Bashair, in the Bir al-Azab district of Sanaa whence on September 26, 1962, Abdullah as-Sallal, whom al-Badr had appointed commander of the royal guard, staged a coup, and declared himself president of the Yemen Arab Republic.

Al-Badr escaped to the north of North Yemen, and rallied tribes that supported him in opposition to Sallal. Fighting erupted between the two groups, starting the North Yemen Civil War. Al-Badr started getting support from Saudi Arabia, while the republicans received support from Egypt.

Although the revolution had announced to the world that al-Badr had died beneath the rubble of his palace, he had in fact managed to escape unhurt and set out to the north. As he proceeded on his journey the tribes rallied round him pledging him their unconditional allegiance as Amir al-Mumineen ("Leader of the believers"). These tribes were Zaydi Shia for whom unstinted loyalty to an imam from the Ahl al-Bayt (the descendants of the Prophet) was a fundamental obligation of their religion. A few days later he held a press conference over the border in south-west Saudi Arabia. His uncle Sayf al-Islam al-Hassan, who had been abroad and had been proclaimed Imam at the news of al-Badr's alleged demise, immediately gave allegiance to him together with all the princes of the Hamid al-Din family. Soon the entire tribal confederation of Bakil along with most of Hashid who occupied the central and northern highlands of Yemen and who had been Zaydis for centuries joined enthusiastically the cause of the Imam and the princes to fight the revolutionary regime.

== Exile and death ==
In 1970, despite the fact that territorially most of the Yemen remained under the control of al-Badr and the Hamid al-Din family, Saudi Arabia, which had been the principal opponent of the Sanaa regime, recognized the Yemen Arab Republic and other nations like the United Kingdom swiftly followed suit.

Stunned by Saudi Arabia's recognition of the republican regime which had been negotiated without any consultation with him whatsoever, al-Badr refused to stay any longer in Saudi Arabia and demanded that he be permitted to leave the kingdom immediately. He went to England, where he lived quietly in a modest house in Kent, only going abroad to visit the holy cities of Mecca and Medina and to call on relatives and friends in that part of the world.

He died in 1996 in London and was buried in Medina, Saudi Arabia.

== See also ==
- North Yemen Civil War
- Bruce Conde

== Bibliography ==
- Keesing's Contemporary Archives. Vol. XI. London: Keesing's Publications. 1957–1958.
- Partner, Peter (2011). A Short Political Guide to the Arab World. Literary Licensing, LLC. ISBN 978-1258111021.
- Orkaby, Asher (2017). Beyond the Arab Cold War: The International History of the Yemen Civil War, 1962-68. Oxford Studies in International History (Illustrated ed.). Oxford University Press. ISBN 978-0190618445.

Muhammad al-Badr Rassids Born: February 15 1926 Died: August 6 1996
Regnal titles
Preceded by Ahmad bin Yahya	King of Yemen; 18 – 27 September 1962	Monarchy abolished (Abdullah al-Sallal President of North Yemen)
Titles in pretence
Loss of title Republic declared	— TITULAR — King of Yemen; 27 September 1962 – 6 August 1996	Succeeded by Ageel bin Muhammad al-Badr
