= Abdullah al-Hagri =

Yemeni politician (1911–1977)

Qadhi Abdullah al-Hajjri (Arabic: القاضي عبدالله الحجري; 1911 – 10 April 1977) was the Prime Minister of the Yemen Arab Republic from 30 December 1972 until 10 February 1974. He was appointed by President Abdul Rahman al-Iryani.

== Death ==
Hajjri was assassinated in London on April 10, 1977, along with his wife Fatimah and Abdullah Ali al Hammami, minister plenipotentiary of the Yemen Arab Republic embassy in London. All three were shot dead in their Mercedes-Benz car outside the Royal Lancaster Hotel near Hyde Park using a silenced .32 automatic pistol. A report in a British newspaper named Zohair Yousif Akache, a Popular Front for the Liberation of Palestine (PFLP) militant and later that year the leader of the hijacking of Lufthansa Flight 181, as being wanted by Scotland Yard in connection with the political killings.

Political offices
Preceded by Mohsin Ahmad al-Aini	Prime Minister of North Yemen; 1972–1974	Succeeded by Hassan Muhammad Makki
