= Mohsin Ahmad al-Aini =

Prime Minister of the Yemen Arab Republic (1932–2021)

- محسن أحمد العيني
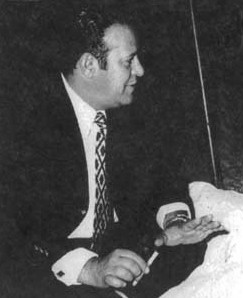
- Mohsin Ahmad al-Aini in 1972

11th Prime Minister of Yemen Arab Republic
- In office 1967–1967
- Preceded by: Abdullah as-Sallal
- Succeeded by: Hassan al-Amri
- In office 1969–1969
- Preceded by: Abdul Salam Sabrah
- Succeeded by: Abdullah Kurshumi
- In office 1970–1971
- Preceded by: Abdullah Kurshumi
- Succeeded by: Abdul Salam Sabrah
- In office 1971–1972
- Preceded by: Abdul Salam Sabrah
- Succeeded by: Kadhi Abdullah al-Hagri
- In office 1974–1975
- Preceded by: Hassan Muhammad Makki
- Succeeded by: Abdul Latif Dayfallah

Personal details
- Born: 20 October 1932 Bani Bahloul, Sanhan District, Yemen
- Died: 25 August 2021 (aged 88) Cairo, Egypt

Mohsin Ahmad Alaini (Arabic: محسن أحمد العيني; 20 October 1932 – 25 August 2021) was a Yemeni politician who served as the prime minister of the Yemen Arab Republic five times between 1967 and 1975.

== Biography ==
In 1947, Alaini was selected among other students to do a scholarship in Beirut, he then studied law at the Cairo University in 1952–59, and Sorbonne in 1956–57. In 1957, he published a book, Battles and Conspiracies Against the Yemeni Issue (Arabic: معارك ومؤامرات ضد قضية اليمن). He started his career as a teacher in Aden, where he was involved in the anti-colonial trade union movement from 1960 onwards against British rule. Expelled from Aden by the British in 1961, he returned to Egypt as a delegate of the trade union federation. In Cairo, he joined the Ba'ath Party and allied himself with the moderate Nasserists.

Following the Civil War and the overthrow of the monarchy, he was appointed the first foreign minister of the Yemen Arab Republic.

He subsequently served four terms as prime minister under President Abdul Rahman al-Iryani. They were:

1. 5 November 1967 to 21 December 1967
2. 29 July 1969 to 2 September 1969
3. 5 February 1970 to 26 February 1971
4. 18 September 1971 to 30 December 1972

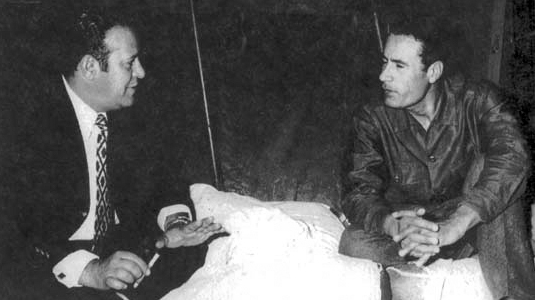
Mohsin al-Aini with Libyan leader Muammar Gaddafi

The fifth and final term was served under Ibrahim al-Hamdi. It was from 22 June 1974 to 16 January 1975.

Between and after these terms he was appointed foreign minister (1962, 1965, 1970–71, 1971–72, 1974), and sent as ambassador to the United Nations (1962–65, 1965–66, 1967–68, 1979–81), the Soviet Union (1968–70), France (1971, 1975–76), the United Kingdom (1973–74), West Germany (1981–84) and United States (1963–66, 1984–97). Back in Yemen he was nominated for the Shura council of elder statesmen.

Alaini died on 25 August 2021, aged 88.

== Personal life ==
In 1962, al-Aini married Aziza Abulahom (Abu Luhum), with whom he had two sons, two daughters and thirteen grandchildren. His brother-in-law and important supporter, Sinan Abu Luhum, was governor of the port city of Al Hudaydah for many years.

== Literature ==
- Ron Leonard Bidwell: Dictionary of Modern Arab History, page 56f. Routledge, New York 1998
- The International Who's Who 1988–89, page 17. Europa Plublications Limited, London 1988
- Robert D. Burrowes: Historical Dictionary of Yemen, page 24. Lanham 2010

Political offices
Preceded by Abdullah as-Sallal	Prime Minister of Yemen Arab Republic; 1967	Succeeded by Hassan al-Amri
Preceded by Abdul Salam Sabrah (acting)	Prime Minister of Yemen Arab Republic; 1969	Succeeded by Abdullah Kurshumi
Preceded by Abdullah Kurshumi	Prime Minister of Yemen Arab Republic; 1970–1971	Succeeded by Abdul Salam Sabrah (acting)
Preceded by Abdul Salam Sabrah (acting)	Prime Minister of Yemen Arab Republic; 1971–1972	Succeeded by Kadhi Abdullah al-Hagri
Preceded by Hassan Muhammad Makki	Prime Minister of Yemen Arab Republic; 1974–1975	Succeeded by Abdul Latif Dayfallah (acting)
