= Abdul-Karim Al-Iryani =

Yemeni politician and minister (1934–2015)

- عبد الكريم الإرياني
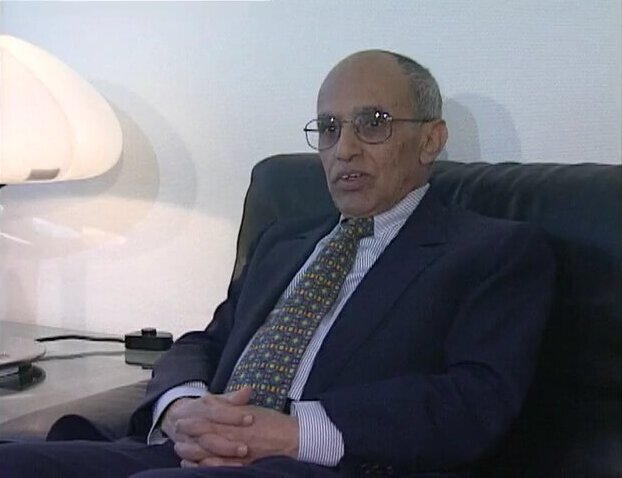
- Iryani in 1997

4th Prime Minister of Yemen
- In office 29 April 1998 – 31 March 2001
- President: Ali Abdullah Saleh
- Preceded by: Faraj Said Bin Ghanem
- Succeeded by: Abdul Qadir Bajamal

Deputy Prime Minister of Yemen, Minister of Foreign Affairs of Yemen
- In office 6 October 1994 – 25 May 1997
- President: Ali Abdullah Saleh

Minister of Foreign Affairs of North Yemen
- In office 1984–1990

Prime Minister of North Yemen
- In office 1980–1983
- Preceded by: Abdul Aziz Abdul Ghani
- Succeeded by: Abdul Aziz Abdul Ghani

Minister of Education of North Yemen
- In office 1976–1978

Minister of Development of North Yemen
- In office 1974–1976

Personal details
- Born: 12 October 1934 Eryan, Ibb Governorate, North Yemen
- Died: 8 November 2015 (aged 81) Frankfurt, Germany
- Party: General People's Congress
- Relations: Abdul Rahman al-Eryani (uncle); Mutaher al-Eryani (brother)
- Education: University of Georgia

Abdul Karim Ali Al-Eryani (/ˈæbdʊl kɑːˈriːm æl ɪriːˈɑːni/; Arabic: عبد الكريم علي يحيى محمد عبد الله الإرياني; 12 October 1934 – 8 November 2015; also spelled Al-Eryani) was a Yemeni politician who served as the Prime Minister of Yemen from 29 April 1998 to 31 March 2001. Al-Iryani, along with President Ali Abdullah Saleh, was the Secretary General of the General People's Congress (GPC).

== Early life and education ==
Born in Iryan, a village in the central highlands of Ibb, in 1934, Al-Iryani belonged to a prominent family that had held government posts in the region for centuries; many of his ancestors and relatives were judges. He studied in the United States, receiving a Bachelor of Science in agriculture from the University of Georgia in 1962, a Master of Science in agriculture from the same institution in 1964, and a PhD in Biochemical Genetics from Yale University in 1968.

== Career ==
Before Yemen's unification, Al-Iryani served in the government of North Yemen as Minister of Development (1974–1976), Minister of Education (1976–1978), Prime Minister (1980–1983), and Minister of Foreign Affairs (1984–1990). Following unification in 1990, Al-Iryani continued to serve as Minister of Foreign Affairs for the united Republic of Yemen until 1993, when he became Minister of Development. In 1994 he served as deputy Prime Minister of Yemen and Minister of Foreign Affairs until 1997. Al-Iryani was appointed Prime Minister after Faraj Said Bin Ghanem abruptly resigned on 29 April 1998. He served in this capacity until 31 March 2001, when he was succeeded by Abdul Qadir Bajamal.

== Main Accomplishments ==
- Banned imports of fruits and vegetables which resulted in a self-sufficient production of such commodities saving hard currency and creating hundreds of thousands of jobs in agriculture and trade.

- Introduced tens of state-building laws including multi-party system and democracy.

- Played a major role in the negotiation during the reunification process of South and North Yemen. (and was named the architect of the Yemen reunification)

- Convinced the UN Security Council to abolish the scheme of seceding the southern governorates from the united Yemen during the 1994 civil war.

- Opposed an eminent armed conflict with Eritrea when the latter took over the Yemeni island of Hanish in the red sea. He then led the Yemen team in an international court which ruled for the return of the island to Yemen.

- Furiously fought against corruption and in support of women's and human rights.

== Later life and death ==
Al-Iryani was a member of the Global Leadership Foundation, a non-profit organisation set up in 2004 by FW de Klerk to support good governance and reduce conflict around the world. He has been credited with brokering the Arab Spring peace negotiations in 2012, resulting in a transition plan for President Saleh to resign.

Al-Iryani died on 8 November 2015 in Frankfurt. Mustapha Noman, a former Deputy Minister of Foreign Affairs, called him "the last statesman Yemen had, and will have, for another generation."

Political offices
Preceded by Abdul Aziz Abdul Ghani	Prime Minister of North Yemen; 1980–1983	Succeeded by Abdul Aziz Abdul Ghani
Preceded by Faraj Said Bin Ghanem	Prime Minister of Yemen; 1998–2001	Succeeded by Abdul Qadir Bajamal
