= Abdul Aziz Abdul Ghani =

Yemeni politician (1939–2011)

- عبد العزيز عبد الغني

2nd Prime Minister of Yemen
- In office 6 October 1994 – 14 May 1997
- President: Ali Abdullah Saleh
- Preceded by: Muhammad Said al-Attar
- Succeeded by: Faraj Said Bin Ghanem

11th Prime Minister of Yemen Arab Republic
- In office 25 January 1975 – 15 October 1980
- Preceded by: Abdul Latif Dayfallah (acting)
- Succeeded by: Abd Al-Karim Al-Iryani
- In office 13 November 1983 – 22 May 1990
- Preceded by: Abd Al-Karim Al-Iryani
- Succeeded by: Post abolished

1st Governor of Central Bank of North Yemen
- In office 1971–1975
- Preceded by: Post established
- Succeeded by: Abdulla al-Sanabani

Personal details
- Born: 4 July 1939 Hayfan, Taiz Governorate, Kingdom of Yemen
- Died: 22 August 2011 (aged 72) Riyadh, Saudi Arabia
- Party: General People's Congress
- Spouse: Aceya Hamza
- Children: 6
- Education: Colorado College (BA); University of Colorado

Abdul Aziz Abdul Ghani (/ˈɑːbdʊl əˈziːz ˈɑːbdʊl ˈɡɑːni/ AHB-duul ə-ZEEZ AHB-duul GAH-nee; 4 July 1939 – 22 August 2011) was a Yemeni politician who served as the 11th Prime Minister of the Yemen Arab Republic from 1975 to 1980, and 1983 to 1990, and as the 2nd Prime Minister of Yemen from 1994 to 1997. He was assassinated during an attempt against the life of President Ali Abdullah Saleh.

== Early life ==
Abdul Aziz Abdul Ghani was born in Hayfan, Taiz Governorate, Kingdom of Yemen, on 4 July 1939. He graduated from Colorado College with a bachelor of arts degree in economics in 1962, and the University of Colorado with a master's degree in economics in 1964. He was given a honorary decorate in economics by the University of Colorado in 1978. He received a scholarship from the United States Agency for International Development.

== Career ==
Ghani was a teacher at Belquis College from 1964 to 1967. He was a lecturer at Sanaa University from 1972 to 1974.

Ghani was minister of health from 1967 to 1968, and minister of economics from 1968 to 1971. He was the director of the Yemen Bank for Reconstruction and Development in 1968, and governor of the Central Bank of North Yemen from 1971 to 1975.

From 1975 to 1980, and 1983 to 1990, Ghani served as Prime Minister of the Yemen Arab Republic. He served as Prime Minister of Yemen from 1994 to 1997. He was president of the Shura Council from 2001 to 2011.

When North and South Yemen united in 1990, a presidential council was established. This council consisted of people from both the north and south, with Ghani being one of the representatives of the north on the council.

== Personal life ==
Ghani married Aceya Hamza, with whom he had six children, in 1966. He served as minister of health from 1967 to 1968, and minister of economics from 1968 to 1971.

An assassination attempt was made against President Ali Abdullah Saleh on 3 June 2011. Ghani was wounded in the attempt and was given treatment in Saudi Arabia, but died on 22 August. Saleh and Ghani were close political allies for decades. Three days of public mourning was declared after his death.

== Works cited ==
=== Books ===
- Who's Who in the Arab World 2007-2008. De Gruyter Brill. 2011. ISBN 9783110930047.
- Hull, Edmund (2011). High-Value Target: Countering Al Qaeda in Yemen. Potomac Books. ISBN 9781597976794.

=== Journals ===
- Orkaby, Asher (2017). "Yemen's Humanitarian Nightmare: The Real Roots of the Conflict". Foreign Affairs. 96 (6). Council on Foreign Relations: 93–101. doi:10.2307/44823824. JSTOR 44823824.
- Ziadé, Nassib (1991). "Yemen Arab Republic - People's Democratic Republic of Yemen: Agreement on the Establishment of the Republic of Yemen". International Legal Materials. 30 (3). Cambridge University Press: 820–823. doi:10.2307/20693569. JSTOR 20693569.

=== News ===
- Almasmari, Hakim (22 August 2011). "Senior Yemen official dies from palace attack injuries". CNN. Archived from the original on 6 December 2017.

=== Web ===
- "Late H.E Abdul Aziz Abdul Ghani, former Speaker of Shoora Council, Republic of Yemen". Association of Senates, Shoora and Equivalent Councils in Africa and the Arab World. Archived from the original on 20 November 2026.

Political offices
Preceded by Abdul Latif Dayfallah (acting)	Prime Minister of North Yemen; 1975–1980	Succeeded by Abdul Karim al-Iryani
Preceded by Abdul Karim al-Iryani	Prime Minister of North Yemen; 1983–1990	Succeeded by Position abolished
Preceded by Muhammad Said al-Attar	Prime Minister of Yemen; 1994–1997	Succeeded by Faraj Said Bin Ghanem
