= Abdullah al-Sallal =

President of North Yemen from 1962 to 1967

- عبد الله السلال
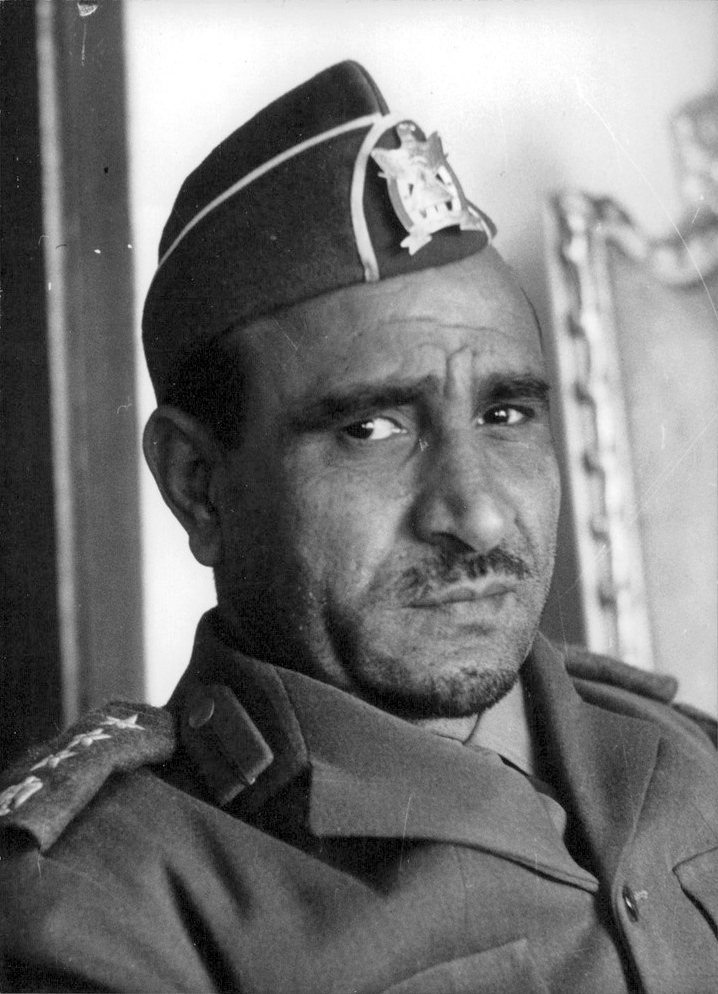
- Al-Sallal in 1963

1st President of Yemen Arab Republic
- In office 26 September 1962 – 5 November 1967
- Prime Minister: Himself; Abdul Latif Dayfallah; Abdul Rahman al-Iryani; Hassan al-Amri; Hamoud al-Gayifi; Hassan al-Amri; Ahmad Muhammad Numan; Hassan al-Amri
- Preceded by: Position established (Muhammad al-Badr as King and Imam of Yemen)
- Succeeded by: Abdul Rahman al-Eryani

Prime Minister of Yemen Arab Republic
- In office 28 September 1962 – 26 April 1963
- President: Himself
- Preceded by: Position established
- Succeeded by: Abdul Latif Dayfallah
- In office 6 July 1965 – 21 July 1965
- President: Himself
- Preceded by: Ahmad Muhammad Numan
- Succeeded by: Hassan al-Amri
- In office 18 September 1966 – 5 November 1967
- President: Himself
- Preceded by: Hassan al-Amri
- Succeeded by: Mohsin Ahmad al-Aini

Personal details
- Born: 9 January 1917 Sanaa, Yemen Vilayet, Ottoman Empire
- Died: 5 March 1994 (aged 77) Sanaa, Yemen
- Party: None (Military)

Military service
- Allegiance: Kingdom of Yemen (1939–1962); North Yemen (1962–1990); Yemen (1990–1994)
- Branch/service: North Yemeni Army
- Years of service: 1939–1994
- Rank: Field Marshal
- Battles/wars: Al-Waziri coup North Yemen Civil War

Abdullah Yahya al-Sallal (Arabic: عبد الله يحيى السلال, romanized: ʿAbd Allāh Yaḥyā as-Sallāl; 9 January 1917 – 5 March 1994) was a Yemeni military officer and revolutionary who was the leader of the North Yemeni Revolution of 1962 and served as the first president of the Yemen Arab Republic from 27 September 1962 until his removal on 5 November 1967. His government abolished slavery in Yemen.

== Early life ==
Al-Sallal was born in the village of Sha'asan, Sanhan district, in Sanaa Governorate. His father died when he was young. Al-Sallal was sent to the only orphanage in Sanaa, known as the Orphan School, which later became famous for raising many of Yemen's greatest patriots and some of the most influential politicians of that era.

In the late 1930s, he completed his military education in Baghdad, Iraq. He became a second lieutenant at this time.

Though not a member of the social elite in Yemen, Al-Sallal was widely respected by the military community as a competent and brazen officer despite being the son of a butcher, a profession looked down upon prior to the revolution.

== Political career ==
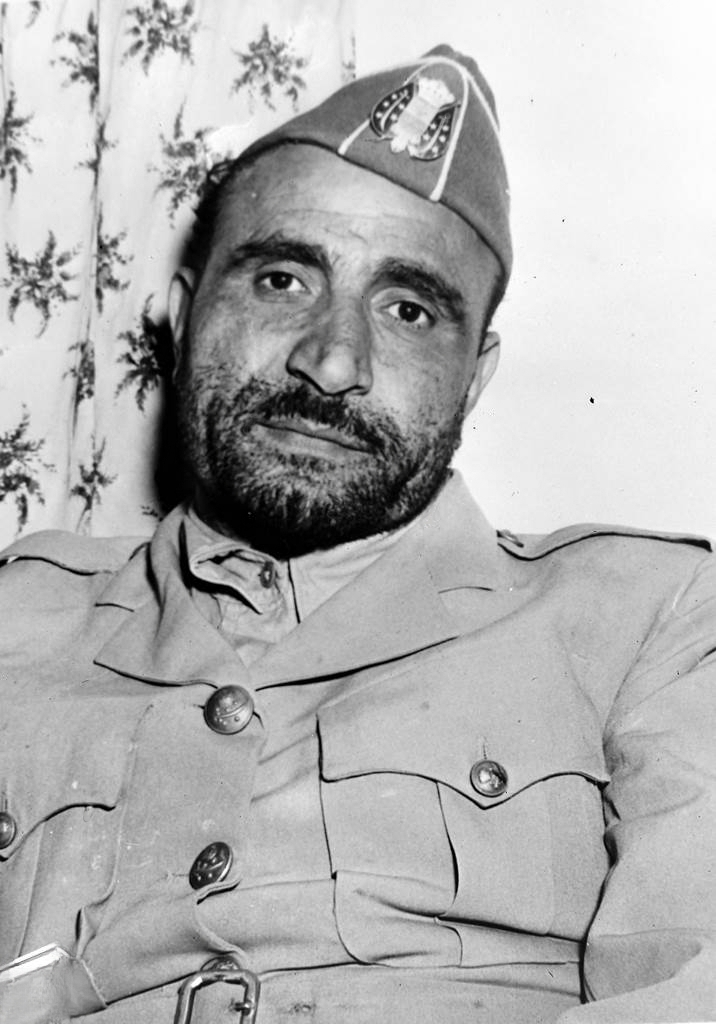
Abdullah al-Sallal in his Mutawakkilite army uniform

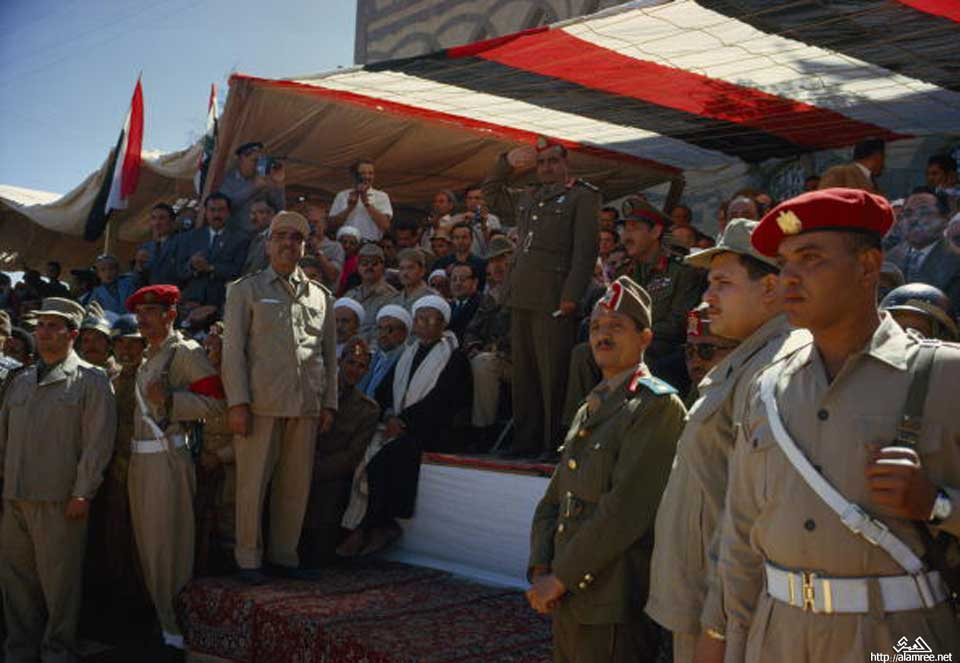
Abdullah al-Sallal in a military display, March 1963

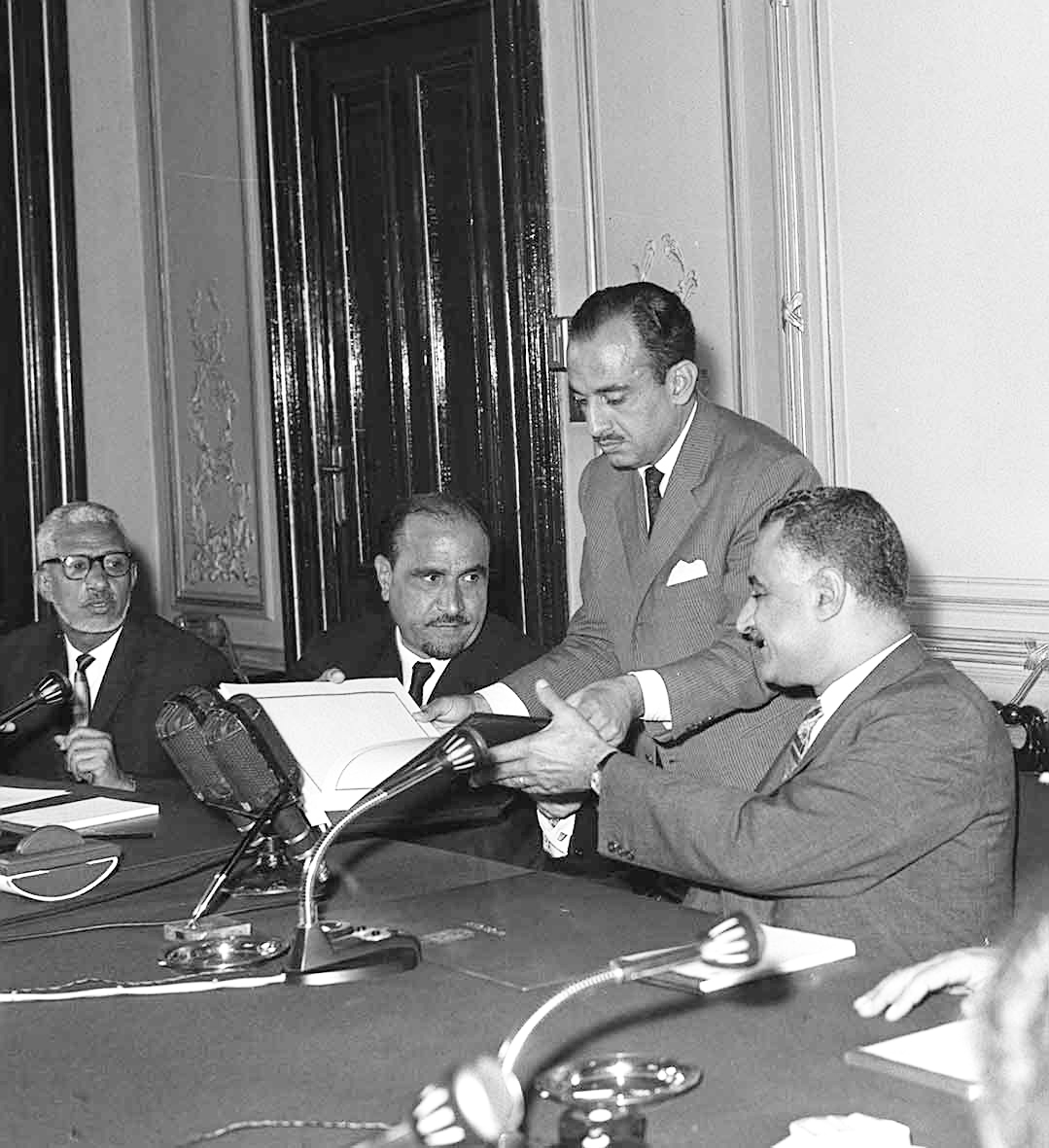
Al-Sallal with Egyptian president Gamal Abdel Nasser in a joint meeting, July 1964

Al-Sallal led the revolutionary forces that deposed King Muhammad al-Badr and brought the Kingdom of Yemen to an end. He presided over the newly founded Yemen Arab Republic (YAR), with close ties to Gamal Abdel Nasser of Egypt which served as the Yemen Arab Republic's strongest ally in the war against the Saudi Arabian-backed royalists that lasted into 1970.

Yemen's President Abdullah al-Sallal negotiated with tribal leaders after the revolution to help cement the republic. He was later ousted in a bloodless coup led by Abdul Rahman Al-Iryani and exiled to Egypt, where he remained until President Ali Abdullah Saleh invited him to return in the early 1980s.

Six different men held the position of Prime Minister under Al-Sallal, including Al-Sallal himself three times. He held both titles from the formation of the republic until 26 April 1963, when he appointed Abdul Latif Dayfallah, as well as briefly in 1965 and from 18 September 1966 until the end of his presidency. At the time, he participated in the 2nd Summit of the Non-Aligned Movement in Cairo in 1964. Abdul Rahman al-Eryani, al-Sallal's successor to the presidency in 1967, served as prime minister in 1963 and 1964. Hassan al-Amri held the post three times.

== Personal life ==
al-Sallal's two sons, Jamal and Ali, both had diplomatic and political positions. Jamal served as the foreign minister and is the current ambassador to Canada.

Political offices
Preceded by Position established	Prime Minister of North Yemen; 1962–1963	Succeeded by Abdul Latif Dayfallah
Preceded by Ahmad Muhammad Numan	Prime Minister of North Yemen; 1965	Succeeded by Hassan al-Amri
Preceded by Hassan al-Amri	Prime Minister of North Yemen; 1966–1967	Succeeded by Mohsin Ahmad al-Aini
Preceded by Muhammad al-Badr King of Yemen	President of North Yemen; 1962–1967	Succeeded by Abdul Rahman al-Eryani
