= Abdul Rahman al-Eryani =

President of North Yemen from 1967 to 1974

- عبد الرحمن الإرياني
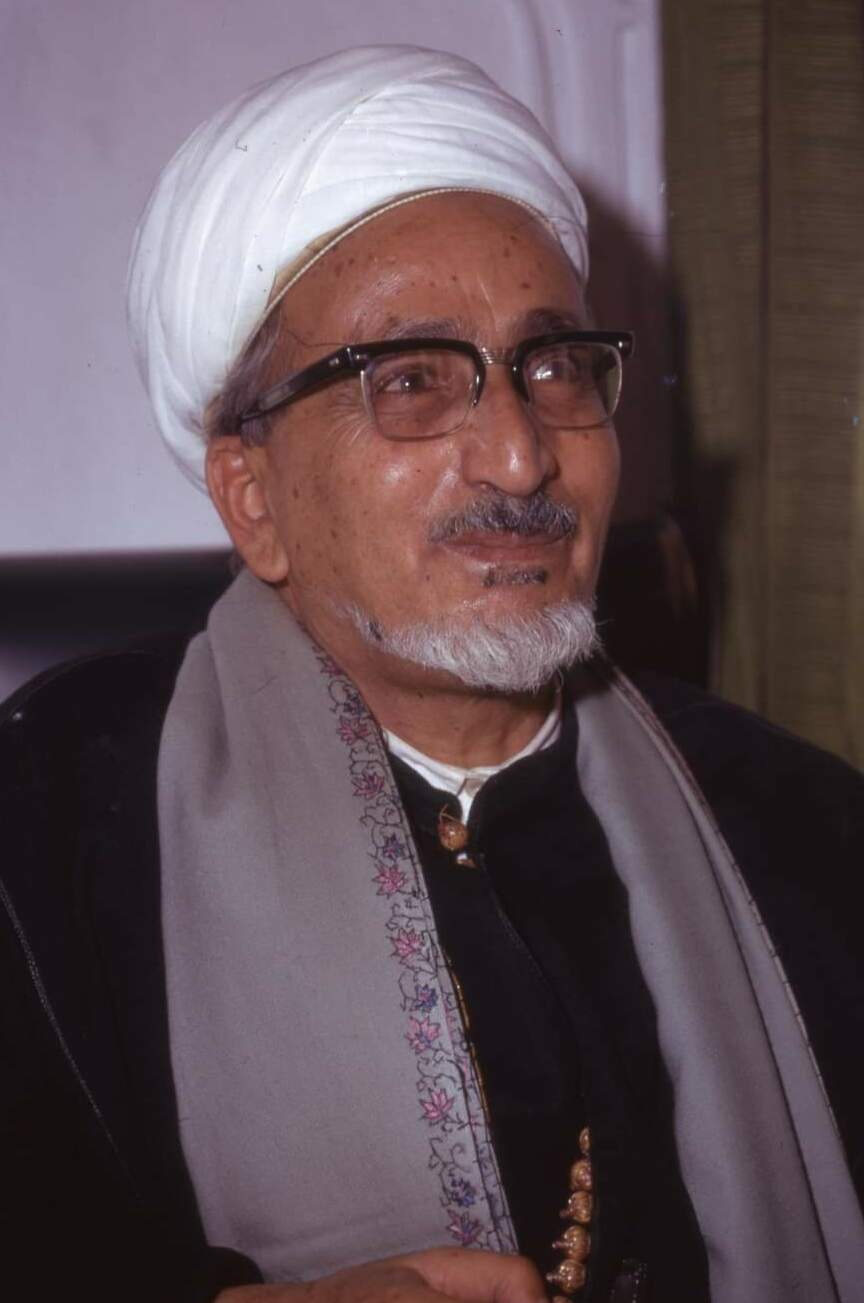
- Al-Eryani in 1972

2nd President of the Yemen Arab Republic
- In office 5 November 1967 – 13 June 1974
- Prime Minister: See list: Mohsin Ahmad al-Aini; Hassan al-Amri; Abdul Salam Sabrah (Acting); Mohsin Ahmad al-Aini; Abdullah Kurshumi; Mohsin Ahmad al-Aini; Abdul Salam Sabrah (Acting); Ahmad Muhammad Numan; Hassan al-Amri; Abdul Salam Sabrah (Acting); Mohsin Ahmad al-Aini; Kadhi Abdullah al-Hagri; Hassan Muhammad Makki
- Preceded by: Abdullah al-Sallal
- Succeeded by: Ibrahim al-Hamdi

Personal details
- Born: 10 June 1910 Iryan, Yemen Vilayet, Ottoman Empire
- Died: 14 March 1998 (aged 87) Damascus, Syria
- Party: National Yemeni Union

Military service
- Allegiance: North Yemen
- Battles/wars: North Yemen Civil War

Abdul Rahman Yahya al-Eryani (Arabic: عبد الرحمن الإرياني, romanized: ʿAbd ar-Raḥmān Yaḥyā al-Iryānī; 10 June 1910 – 14 March 1998) was a Yemeni politician who served as the second President of the Yemen Arab Republic (North Yemen) from 5 November 1967 to 13 June 1974. Originally a leader of the Free Yemeni Movement opposition group during the time of the Mutawakkilite Kingdom of Yemen, al-Eryani served as Minister of Religious Endowments under North Yemen's first republican government and later became the only civilian politician to have led Northern Yemen. He was eventually overthrown by Ibrahim al-Hamdi and died in exile.

== Early life ==
Abd al-Rahman al-Iryani was born in the village of Iryan in 1910. His father, Yahia al-Iryani, was the Chief Judge of the Mutawakkilite Kingdom of Yemen and a highly regarded Sharia scholar. His mother, Salwa al-Iryani was well known for her charitable efforts in her village.

Abd al-Rahman started his education in his village Iryan until the age of 16 when he left for the capital Sanaa to study at its famous Sharia School. After a few years, he graduated and worked at the Imam Court until 1937 when he was appointed as a judge for the first time.

According to Yossi Melman of Haaretz, Dorit Mizrahi of the Mishpacha Magazine, and an article in the weekly HaOlam HaZeh, there are allegations that al-Iryani was born Zekharia Hadad to a Yemenite Jewish family in Ibb. According to this version, in 1918, there was a drought in Yemen, which had a severe effect on the Jews, who were generally worse off than the Arabs. Both his parents died, and he was then adopted by the al-Iryani, a powerful Muslim family, and was renamed "Abd al-Rahman al-Iryani" and converted to Islam. At that time, Yemen was ruled by Yahya Muhammad Hamid ed-Din, who decreed that all orphaned Jewish children must be disconnected from their religion and be given over for adoption to a Muslim family.

According to YemenOnline, the claim of Jewish descent of Abd al-Rahman al-Iryani is a "fantasy". According to this version, Abdul Rahman was not the adopted Zekharia, but his stepbrother. Furthermore, Abdul Raheem, who was close to his stepbrother, Abdul Rahman, was the real Zekharia Hadad. Abdul Raheem is said to have retired in Iryan before dying in 1980, and has dozens of surviving children and grandchildren.

== Participation in the Alwaziri coup ==
Al-Eryani actively opposed the kings of the Kingdom of Yemen, helping to lead the Free Yemeni Movement in pushing for a republic. In February 1948, he participated in the Alwaziri coup against the then ruler of Yemen, Yahya Hamiduddin, aiming at the establishment of a constitutional monarchy. He was imprisoned for about 7 years after the failure of the revolution, which lasted only for 12 days. Al-Eryani was sentenced to death by beheading in 1955 for his activities with the Free Yemeni Movement. However, minutes before his execution, he was granted a reprieve by King Ahmed bin Yahya. He spent a total of 15 years in jail until his release in 1962.

== Term as President of North Yemen ==
Abdul Rahman Al-Eryani opposed Egyptian and Saudi interference in Yemeni affairs and, with two of his colleagues, Ahmad Muhammad Numan and Mohamad Al-Zubairi, led a strong movement against Egyptian intervention in the North Yemen Civil War between republicans and royalists. He was held in Egypt with Numan in 1966 while their partner Al-Zubairi had been assassinated earlier.

In 1970, he arrived at a national conciliation agreement with the supporters of the royal regime and established a formal relation with Saudi Arabia. In 1972, he reached an agreement with South Yemen for the unification of the two parts of the country, which constituted the basic foundations for the unification of 1990. It was also during his regime that Yemen had parliamentary elections and permanent constitution for the first time.

Following Ibrahim al-Hamdi's coup in 1974, al-Eryani went into exile in Syria. He eventually died in Damascus in 1998.

| Preceded by Abdullah al-Sallal | President of North Yemen; 1967–1974 | Succeeded by Ibrahim al-Hamdi |
