= Yashiʽ =

Yashiʽ يشيع
- Town
- Location in Yemen
- Coordinates: 15.88992°N 43.91526°E
- Country: Yemen
- Governorate: Amran
- District: Khamir
- Elevation: 8,566 ft (2,611 m)
- Time zone: UTC+3 (Yemen Standard Time)

Yashiʽ (Arabic: يشيع Yashī‘), also called Bayt Yashiʽ, is a small town in Khamir District of 'Amran Governorate, Yemen. It is located 9 km northwest of Hamidah, beyond the northern end of Jabal Iyal Yazid. It has historically been part of Bani ʽAbd territory.

== Name and history ==
According to the 10th-century writer al-Hamdani, Yashiʽ (which he calls Qasr Yashiʽ) is named after one Yashīʽ b. Riyām b. Nahafān, of the tribe of Hamdan. Yashiʽ has been inhabited since pre-Islamic times, and its ancient ruins are still visible. The Sirat of al-Abbasi mentions Yashiʽ three times; in one episode, the first Imam of Yemen, al-Hadi ila'l-Haqq Yahya, traveled to Yashiʽ in 286 AH (899-900 CE) to meet with the sheikhs of nearby al-ʽAsum. He chastised them for their supposed licentious behavior, and they repented and pledged their support for al-Hadi's rule. (Note: This incident is also recorded in the Ghayat al-amani of Yahya ibn al-Husayn, but the Ghayat erroneously says it took place at Huth instead.)
