= Bani Qais =

Bani Qais may refer to:

- Bani Qais ('Amran), a sub-district in Bani Suraim district, 'Amran Governorate, Yemen
- Bani Qais (Ibb), a sub-district in Ar Radmah district, Ibb Governorate, Yemen
- Bani Qais (Sanaa), a sub-district in Bani Matar district, Sanaa Governorate, Yemen
- Bani Qa'is district, Hajjah Governorate, Yemen
