= Al-Madlaʽah =

Al-Madlaʽah المضلعة
- Town
- Location in Yemen
- Coordinates: 15.70452°N 43.8944°E
- Country: Yemen
- Governorate: Amran
- District: Jabal Iyal Yazid
- Elevation: 8,281 ft (2,524 m)
- Time zone: UTC+3 (Yemen Standard Time)

Al-Madlaʽah (Arabic: المضلعة al-Maḍlaʽah) is a village in Jabal Iyal Yazid District of 'Amran Governorate, Yemen. It is located west of 'Amran at the southern end of Jabal Iyal Yazid, overlooking the al-Bawn plain.

== History ==
Al-Madlaʽah often appears in historical texts under the spellings al-Maṭlaʽah or al-Maẓlaʽah, and is first mentioned in the year 1273 (672 AH). There is no indication that it was ever fortified, but it served as a military encampment or stopping place on several occasions throughout the late medieval/early modern period.
