= Naʽat, Yemen =

Naʽat نجر
- Village
- Location in Yemen
- Coordinates: 15.7486°N 44.0986°E
- Country: Yemen
- Governorate: 'Amran
- District: Kharif
- Elevation: 8,350 ft (2,545 m)
- Time zone: UTC+3 (Yemen Standard Time)

Naʽat (Nāʽaṭ), also transliterated as Naʽit, is a village in Kharif District of 'Amran Governorate, Yemen. It is located on Jabal Thanayn, on the eastern side of the al-Bawn plain and close to Raydah.

== History ==
Naʽat is an ancient settlement, with pre-Islamic ruins that have survived to the present. The 10th-century writer al-Hamdani mentions the place frequently in his Sifat Jazirat al-Arab and gives a detailed description of its ruins. According to him, the name Naʽat is derived from that of Thawr (a.k.a. Nāʽiṭ) ibn Sufyān, of the tribe of Hamdan. By the time of al-Hamdani, however, Naʽat was probably already in decline, and it is largely absent from historical accounts during the medieval and early modern periods.
