= Najr =

Najr نجر
- Village
- Location in Yemen
- Coordinates: 15.64257°N 43.94758°E
- Country: Yemen
- Governorate: 'Amran
- District: Iyal Surayh
- Elevation: 7,536 ft (2,297 m)
- Time zone: UTC+3 (Yemen Standard Time)

Najr (Arabic: نجر Najr) is a village in Iyal Surayh District of 'Amran Governorate, Yemen. It is located just to the south of 'Amran, on a small hill at the lower end of the Wadi Khuzamir.

== History ==
There are pre-Islamic ruins at Najr. Robert T.O. Wilson identified Najr with the palace of al-Nujayr mentioned by the 10th-century author al-Hamdani as one of the famous structures of Yemen. Najr was used as a military base at the edge of the Bawn during the medieval period, and during the Rasulid era, it was used as a base for a siege against Thula.
