= Bani Mansour =

Bani Mansour may refer to:

- Bani Mansour (Amran), a sub-district of As Sudah District, Yemen
- Bani Mansour (Ibb), a sub-district of Ba'dan District, Yemen
- Bani Mansour (Sanaa), a sub-district of Al Haymah Al Kharijiyah District, Yemen
