= Bani Al-Harth (Amran) =

Bani Al-Harth بني الحارث
- Sub-district
- Country: Yemen
- Governorate: 'Amran Governorate
- District: As Sawd District

Population (2004)
  - Total: 2,897
- Time zone: UTC+3

Bani Al-Harth (Arabic: بني الحارث) is a sub-district located in As Sawd District, 'Amran Governorate, Yemen. Bani Al-Harth had a population of 2897 according to the 2004 census.
