= Al-Akkhum =

Al-Akkhum الاكهوم
- Sub-district
- Country: Yemen
- Governorate: 'Amran Governorate
- District: Jabal Iyal Yazid District

Population (2004)
  - Total: 6,982
- Time zone: UTC+3

Al-Akkhum (Arabic: الاكهوم) is a sub-district located in Jabal Iyal Yazid District, 'Amran Governorate, Yemen. Al-Akkhum had a population of 6982 according to the 2004 census.
