= Jabal Maswar =

Jabal Maswar جبل مسور
- Sub-district
- Country: Yemen
- Governorate: 'Amran Governorate
- District: Maswar District

Population (2004)
  - Total: 4,328
- Time zone: UTC+3

Jabal Maswar (Arabic: جبل مسور) is a sub-district located in Maswar District, 'Amran Governorate, Yemen. Jabal Maswar had a population of 4328 according to the 2004 census.
