= Al-Khamis al-Wast =

Al-Khamis al-Wast الخميس الواسط
- Sub-district
- Country: Yemen
- Governorate: 'Amran Governorate
- District: Habur Zulaymah District

Population (2004)
  - Total: 12,123
- Time zone: UTC+3

Al-Khamis al-Wast (Arabic: الخميس الواسط) is a sub-district located in Habur Zulaymah District, 'Amran Governorate, Yemen. Al-Khamis al-Wast had a population of 12,123 according to the 2004 census.
