= Al-Raghil =

Al-Raghil الرغيل
- Sub-district
- Country: Yemen
- Governorate: 'Amran Governorate
- District: Maswar District

Population (2004)
  - Total: 2,628
- Time zone: UTC+3

Al-Raghil (Arabic: الرغيل) is a sub-district located in Maswar District, 'Amran Governorate, Yemen. Al-Raghil had a population of 2628 according to the 2004 census.
