= Iyal Yahya =

Iyal Yahya عيال يحيى
- Sub-district
- Country: Yemen
- Governorate: 'Amran Governorate
- District: Jabal Iyal Yazid District

Population (2004)
  - Total: 11,469
- Time zone: UTC+3

Iyal Yahya (Arabic: عيال يحيى) is a sub-district located in Jabal Iyal Yazid District, 'Amran Governorate, Yemen. Iyal Yahya had a population of 11469 according to the 2004 census.
