= Thulth Ghahyan =

Thulth Ghahyan ثلث ضحيان
- Sub-district
- Country: Yemen
- Governorate: 'Amran Governorate
- District: Kharif District

Population (2004)
  - Total: 2,027
- Time zone: UTC+3

Thulth Ghahyan (Arabic: ثلث ضحيان) is a sub-district located in Kharif District, 'Amran Governorate, Yemen. Thulth Ghahyan had a population of 2027 according to the 2004 census.
