= Dhu Al-Qutaysh =

Dhu Al-Qutaysh ذو القطيش
- Sub-district
- Country: Yemen
- Governorate: 'Amran Governorate
- District: Huth District

Population (2004)
  - Total: 1,553
- Time zone: UTC+3

Dhu Al-Qutaysh (Arabic: ذو القطيش) is a sub-district located in Huth District, 'Amran Governorate, Yemen. Dhu Al-Qutaysh had a population of 1553 according to the 2004 census.
