= Bani Abas =

Bani al-Abas بني العباس
- Sub-district
- Country: Yemen
- Governorate: 'Amran Governorate
- District: Thula District

Population (2004)
  - Total: 6,106
- Time zone: UTC+3

Bani al-Abas (Arabic: بني العباس) is a sub-district located in Thula District, 'Amran Governorate, Yemen. Bani al-Abas had a population of 6106 according to the 2004 census.
