= Bani Awf =

Bani Awf بني عوف
- Sub-district
- Location in Yemen
- Coordinates: 16°11′15″N 43°37′41″E
- Country: Yemen
- Governorate: 'Amran Governorate
- District: Al Madan District

Population (2004)
  - Total: 5,968
- Time zone: UTC+3

Bani Awf (Arabic: بني عوف) is a sub-district located in Al Madan District, 'Amran Governorate, Yemen. Bani Awf had a population of 5968 according to the 2004 census.
