= Wadi Jufan and Habasha =

Wadi Jufan and Habasha وادي جوفان وحباشة
- Sub-district
- Country: Yemen
- Governorate: 'Amran Governorate
- District: Harf Sufyan District

Population (2004)
  - Total: 2,009
- Time zone: UTC+3

Wadi Jufan and Habasha (Arabic: وادي جوفان وحباشة) is a sub-district located in Harf Sufyan District, 'Amran Governorate, Yemen. Wadi Jufan and Habasha had a population of 2009 according to the 2004 census.
