= Bani Eid =

Bani Eid بني عيد
- Sub-district
- Country: Yemen
- Governorate: 'Amran Governorate
- District: Habur Zulaymah District

Population (2004)
  - Total: 8,461
- Time zone: UTC+3

Bani Eid (Arabic: بني عيد) is a sub-district located in Habur Zulaymah District, 'Amran Governorate, Yemen. Bani Eid had a population of 8461 according to the 2004 census.
