= Al-Gharbi ('Amran) =

Al-Gharbi الغربى
- Sub-district
- Location in Yemen
- Coordinates: 16°4′26″N 43°42′47″E
- Country: Yemen
- Governorate: 'Amran Governorate
- District: Qaflat Othor District

Population (2004)
  - Total: 10,325
- Time zone: UTC+3

Al-Gharbi (Arabic: الغربى) is a sub-district located in Qaflat Othor District, 'Amran Governorate, Yemen. Al-Gharbi had a population of 10325 according to the 2004 census.
