= Al-Rayah al-Wasta =

Al-Rayah al-Wasta الرايه الوسطى
- Sub-district
- Country: Yemen
- Governorate: 'Amran Governorate
- District: Iyal Surayh District

Population (2004)
  - Total: 17,653
- Time zone: UTC+3

Al-Rayah al-Wasta (Arabic: الرايه الوسطى) is a sub-district located in Iyal Surayh District, 'Amran Governorate, Yemen. Al-Rayah al-Wasta had a population of 17653 according to the 2004 census.
