= Khamis Harmal =

Khamis Harmal خميس حرمل
- Sub-district
- Country: Yemen
- Governorate: 'Amran Governorate
- District: Kharif District

Population (2004)
  - Total: 5,715
- Time zone: UTC+3

Khamis Harmal (Arabic: خميس حرمل) is a sub-district located in Kharif District, 'Amran Governorate, Yemen. Khamis Harmal had a population of 5715 according to the 2004 census.
