= Al-Taham =

Al-Taham التهام
- Sub-district
- Country: Yemen
- Governorate: 'Amran Governorate
- District: Maswar District

Population (2004)
  - Total: 4,546
- Time zone: UTC+3

Al-Taham (Arabic: التهام) is a sub-district located in Maswar District, 'Amran Governorate, Yemen. Al-Taham had a population of 4546 according to the 2004 census.
