= Al-Jadam =

Al-Jadam الجدم
- Sub-district
- Country: Yemen
- Governorate: 'Amran Governorate
- District: Maswar District

Population (2004)
  - Total: 4,072
- Time zone: UTC+3

Al-Jadam (Arabic: الجدم) is a sub-district located in Maswar District, 'Amran Governorate, Yemen. Al-Jadam had a population of 4072 according to the 2004 census.
