= Wadi Iyal Ali =

Wadi Iyal Ali وادي عيال علي
- Sub-district
- Country: Yemen
- Governorate: 'Amran Governorate
- District: Maswar District

Population (2004)
  - Total: 2,418
- Time zone: UTC+3

Wadi Iyal Ali (Arabic: وادي عيال علي) is a sub-district located in Maswar District, 'Amran Governorate, Yemen. Wadi Iyal Ali had a population of 2418 according to the 2004 census.
