= Dhi Yabl =

Dhi Yabl ذي يبل
- Sub-district
- Location in Yemen
- Country: Yemen
- Governorate: 'Amran Governorate
- District: Huth District

Population (2004)
  - Total: 1,238
- Time zone: UTC+3

Dhi Yabl (Arabic: ذي يبل) is a sub-district located in Huth District, 'Amran Governorate, Yemen. Dhi Yabl had a population of 1238 according to the 2004 census.
