= Al-Khameri =

Al-Khameri الخمري
- Sub-district
- Country: Yemen
- Governorate: 'Amran Governorate
- District: Huth District

Population (2004)
  - Total: 1,373
- Time zone: UTC+3

Al-Khameri (Arabic: الخمري) is a sub-district located in Huth District, 'Amran Governorate, Yemen. Al-Khameri had a population of 1373 according to the 2004 census.
