= Kharash =

Kharash خراش
- Sub-district
- Country: Yemen
- Governorate: 'Amran Governorate
- District: Huth District

Population (2004)
  - Total: 669
- Time zone: UTC+3

Kharash (Arabic: خراش) is a sub-district located in Huth District, 'Amran Governorate, Yemen. Kharash had a population of 669 according to the 2004 census.
