= Khamis al-Qayfi =

Khamis al-Qayfi خميس القائفي
- Sub-district
- Country: Yemen
- Governorate: 'Amran Governorate
- District: Kharif District

Population (2004)
  - Total: 3,127
- Time zone: UTC+3

Khamis al-Qayfi (Arabic: خميس القائفي) is a sub-district located in Kharif District, 'Amran Governorate, Yemen. Khamis al-Qayfi had a population of 3127 according to the 2004 census.
