= Qaf Dhu Haydan =

Qaf Dhu Haydan قف ذو هديان
- Sub-district
- Location in Yemen
- Country: Yemen
- Governorate: 'Amran Governorate
- District: Al Ashah District

Population (2004)
  - Total: 1,910
- Time zone: UTC+3

Qaf Dhu Haydan (Arabic: قف ذو هديان) is a sub-district located in Al Ashah District, 'Amran Governorate, Yemen. Qaf Dhu Haydan had a population of 1910 according to the 2004 census.
