= Al-Ruba' al-Sharqi =

Al-Ruba' al-Sharqi الربع الشرقي
- Sub-district
- Country: Yemen
- Governorate: 'Amran Governorate
- District: Jabal Iyal Yazid District

Population (2004)
  - Total: 24,492
- Time zone: UTC+3

Al-Ruba' al-Sharqi (Arabic: الربع الشرقي) is a sub-district located in Jabal Iyal Yazid District, 'Amran Governorate, Yemen. Al-Ruba' al-Sharqi had a population of 24492 according to the 2004 census.
