= Bani Hawr =

Bani Hawr بني حور
- Sub-district
- Location in Yemen
- Coordinates: 15°38′40″N 43°41′25″E
- Country: Yemen
- Governorate: 'Amran Governorate
- District: Maswar District

Population (2004)
  - Total: 2,925
- Time zone: UTC+3

Bani Hawr (Arabic: بني حور) is a sub-district located in Maswar District, 'Amran Governorate, Yemen. Bani Hawr had a population of 2925 according to the 2004 census.
