= Ghulat Ajib =

Ghulat Ajib غوله عجيب
- Sub-district
- Country: Yemen
- Governorate: 'Amran Governorate
- District: Raydah District

Population (2004)
  - Total: 4,770
- Time zone: UTC+3

Ghulat Ajib (Arabic: غوله عجيب) is a sub-district located in Raydah District, 'Amran Governorate, Yemen. Hamadah had a population of 4770 according to the 2004 census.
