= Raidah Uzlah =

Raidah ريدة
- Sub-district
- Country: Yemen
- Governorate: 'Amran Governorate
- District: Raydah District

Population (2004)
  - Total: 13,971
- Time zone: UTC+3

Raidah (Arabic: ريدة) is a sub-district located in Raydah District, 'Amran Governorate, Yemen. Raidah had a population of 13971 according to the 2004 census.
