= Khamis Abu Dhaybah =

Khamis Abu Dhaybah خميس ابوذيبة
- Sub-district
- Country: Yemen
- Governorate: 'Amran Governorate
- District: Kharif District

Population (2004)
  - Total: 3,096
- Time zone: UTC+3

Khamis Abu Dhaybah (Arabic: خميس ابوذيبة) is a sub-district located in Kharif District, 'Amran Governorate, Yemen. Khamis Abu Dhaybah had a population of 3096 according to the 2004 census.
