= Thulth al-Wasit =

Thulth al-Wasit ثلث الواسط
- Sub-district
- Country: Yemen
- Governorate: 'Amran Governorate
- District: Kharif District

Population (2004)
  - Total: 2,153
- Time zone: UTC+3

Thulth al-Wasit (Arabic: ثلث الواسط) is a sub-district located in Kharif District, 'Amran Governorate, Yemen. Thulth al-Wasit had a population of 2153 according to the 2004 census.
