= Wadi Ayan =

Wadi Ayan وادي عيان
- Sub-district
- Country: Yemen
- Governorate: 'Amran Governorate
- District: Harf Sufyan District

Population (2004)
  - Total: 1,307
- Time zone: UTC+3

Wadi Ayan (Arabic: وادي عيان) is a sub-district located in Harf Sufyan District, 'Amran Governorate, Yemen. Wadi Ayan had a population of 1307 according to the 2004 census.
