= Iyal Hatem =

Iyal Hatem عيال حاتم
- Sub-district
- Country: Yemen
- Governorate: 'Amran Governorate
- District: Jabal Iyal Yazid District

Population (2004)
  - Total: 24,033
- Time zone: UTC+3

Iyal Hatem (Arabic: عيال حاتم) is a sub-district located in Jabal Iyal Yazid District, 'Amran Governorate, Yemen. had a population of 24033 according to the 2004 census.
