= Bani Jasmar =

Bani Jasmar بني جسمر
- Sub-district
- Country: Yemen
- Governorate: 'Amran Governorate
- District: Maswar District

Population (2004)
  - Total: 2,299
- Time zone: UTC+3

Bani Jasmar (Arabic: بني جسمر) is a sub-district located in Maswar District, 'Amran Governorate, Yemen. Bani Jasmar had a population of 2299 according to the 2004 census.
