= Dhu Alyan =

Dhu Alyan ذو عليان
- Sub-district
- Country: Yemen
- Governorate: 'Amran Governorate
- District: Huth District

Population (2004)
  - Total: 925
- Time zone: UTC+3

Dhu Alyan (Arabic: ذو عليان) is a sub-district located in Huth District, 'Amran Governorate, Yemen. Dhu Alyan had a population of 925 according to the 2004 census.
