= Artil =

Artil أرتل
- Village
- Location in Yemen
- Coordinates: 15.25087°N 44.20353°E
- Country: Yemen
- Governorate: Amran
- District: Huth
- Elevation: 7,799 ft (2,377 m)
- Time zone: UTC+3 (Yemen Standard Time)

Artil (Arabic: أرتل Artil) is a village in Sanhan District of Sanaa Governorate, Yemen. It is located 2 km due south of Bayt Baws.

== Name ==
According to A.B.D.R. Eagle, Artil is "manifestly the modern pronunciation" of the name; it is vocalized Artul in the Sīrat of Ali ibn Muhammad al-Abbasi, and this may be the older pronunciation of the name.

== History ==
The first known mention of is in the Ghāyat al-amānī, by Yahya ibn al-Husayn, which says that during Shawwal of 290 AH (August–September 903), Ali ibn al-Husay Khuftum, the former Abbasid governor of Sanaa, stayed at Artil for six days before being taken captive here and then imprisoned at Bayt Baws. According to Robert T.O. Wilson, Artil was used as "a base for movements against Sanaa rather than a fortifiable and defensible position" during this period.
