= Al-Ghanaya =

Al-Ghanaya الغنايا
- Sub-district
- Country: Yemen
- Governorate: 'Amran Governorate
- District: Suwayr District

Population (2004)
  - Total: 4,542
- Time zone: UTC+3

Al-Ghanaya (Arabic: الغنايا) is a sub-district located in Suwayr District, 'Amran Governorate, Yemen. Al-Ghanaya had a population of 4542 according to the 2004 census.
