= Nasher (Amran) =

Nasher ناشر
- Sub-district
- Country: Yemen
- Governorate: 'Amran Governorate
- District: As Sudah District

Population (2004)
  - Total: 8,554
- Time zone: UTC+3

Nasher (Arabic: ناشر) is a sub-district located in As Sudah District, 'Amran Governorate, Yemen. Nasher had a population of 8,554 according to the 2004 census.
