= Bani Nawf =

Bani Nawf بني نوف
- Sub-district
- Location in Yemen
- Coordinates: 16°13′54″N 43°39′36″E
- Country: Yemen
- Governorate: 'Amran Governorate
- District: Al Madan District

Population (2004)
  - Total: 11,445
- Time zone: UTC+3

Bani Nawf (Arabic: بني نوف) is a sub-district located in Al Madan District, 'Amran Governorate, Yemen. Bani Nawf had a population of 11445 according to the 2004 census.
