= Thulth al-Zudi =

Thulth al-Zudi ثلث الزودي
- Sub-district
- Country: Yemen
- Governorate: 'Amran Governorate
- District: Kharif District

Population (2004)
  - Total: 4,578
- Time zone: UTC+3

Thulth al-Zudi (Arabic: ثلث الزودي) is a sub-district located in Kharif District, 'Amran Governorate, Yemen. Thulth al-Zudi had a population of 4578 according to the 2004 census.
