= Rayshan ('Amran) =

Rayshan ريشان
- Sub-district
- Location in Yemen
- Country: Yemen
- Governorate: 'Amran Governorate
- District: Al Ashah District

Population (2004)
  - Total: 2,845
- Time zone: UTC+3

Rayshan (Arabic: ريشان) is a sub-district located in the Al Ashah District, 'Amran Governorate, Yemen. Rayshan had a population of 2845 according to the 2004 census.
