= Baraush =

Baraush براوش
- Sub-district
- Country: Yemen
- Governorate: 'Amran Governorate
- District: Huth District

Population (2004)
  - Total: 1,032
- Time zone: UTC+3

Baraush (Arabic: براوش) is a sub-district located in Huth District, 'Amran Governorate, Yemen. Baraush had a population of 1032 according to the 2004 census.
