= Al-Thulth =

Al-Thulth الثلث
- Sub-district
- Country: Yemen
- Governorate: 'Amran Governorate
- District: Jabal Iyal Yazid District

Population (2004)
  - Total: 2,234
- Time zone: UTC+3

Al-Thulth (Arabic: الثلث) is a sub-district located in Jabal Iyal Yazid District, 'Amran Governorate, Yemen. had a population of 2234 according to the 2004 census.
