= Dhu Eid =

Dhu Eid ذوعيد
- Sub-district
- Country: Yemen
- Governorate: 'Amran Governorate
- District: Huth District

Population (2004)
  - Total: 791
- Time zone: UTC+3

Dhu Eid (Arabic: ذوعيد) is a sub-district located in Huth District, 'Amran Governorate, Yemen. Dhu Eid had a population of 791 according to the 2004 census.
