= Al-Masana'a =

Al-Masana'a المصانع
- Sub-district
- Country: Yemen
- Governorate: 'Amran Governorate
- District: Thula District

Population (2004)
  - Total: 8,488
- Time zone: UTC+3

Al-Masana'a (Arabic: المصانع) is a sub-district located in Thula District, 'Amran Governorate, Yemen. Al-Masana'a had a population of 8488 according to the 2004 census.
