= Ibn Ahkam =

Ibn Ahkam ابن احكم
- Sub-district
- Country: Yemen
- Governorate: 'Amran Governorate
- District: As Sudah District

Population (2004)
  - Total: 6,332
- Time zone: UTC+3

Ibn Ahkam (Arabic: ابن احكم) is a sub-district located in As Sudah District, 'Amran Governorate, Yemen. Ibn Ahkam had a population of 6332 according to the 2004 census.
