= Bani Jaysh Al-Asfal =

Bani Jaysh Al-Asfal بني جيش الاسفل
- Sub-district
- Country: Yemen
- Governorate: 'Amran Governorate
- District: As Sawd District

Population (2004)
  - Total: 1,064
- Time zone: UTC+3

Bani Jaysh Al-Asfal (Arabic: بني جيش الاسفل) is a sub-district located in As Sawd District, 'Amran Governorate, Yemen. Bani Jaysh Al-Asfal had a population of 1,064 according to the 2004 census.
