= Al-Sawad (Amran) =

Al-Sawad السواد
- Sub-district
- Location in Yemen
- Coordinates: 16.46569°N 43.68098°E
- Country: Yemen
- Governorate: 'Amran Governorate
- District: Al Ashah District

Population (2004)
  - Total: 7,702
- Time zone: UTC+3

Al-Sawad (Arabic: السواد) is a sub-district located in Al Ashah District, 'Amran Governorate, Yemen. Al-Sawad had a population of 7702 according to the 2004 census.
