= Ghashm =

Ghashm غشم
- Sub-district
- Location in Yemen
- Country: Yemen
- Governorate: 'Amran Governorate
- District: Khamir District

Population (2004)
  - Total: 15,213
- Time zone: UTC+3

Ghashm (Arabic: غشم) is a sub-district located in Khamir District, 'Amran Governorate, Yemen. Ghashm had a population of 15213 according to the 2004 census.
