= Al-Harf =

Al-Harf الحرف
- Sub-district
- Location in Yemen
- Country: Yemen
- Governorate: 'Amran Governorate
- District: Harf Sufyan District

Population (2004)
  - Total: 10,886
- Time zone: UTC+3

Al-Harf (Arabic: الحرف) is a sub-district located in Harf Sufyan District, 'Amran Governorate, Yemen. Al-Harf had a population of 10886 according to the 2004 census.
