= Dhaʽwan =

- Village
- Location in Yemen
- Coordinates: 15.65248°N 43.96544°E
- Country: Yemen
- Governorate: 'Amran
- District: Iyal Surayh
- Elevation: 7,523 ft (2,293 m)
- Time zone: UTC+3 (Yemen Standard Time)

Dhaʽwan (Dhaʽwān), also called Bayt Dhaʽwan, is a small village southeast of 'Amran, Yemen, in Iyal Surayh District of 'Amran Governorate.

== Name and history ==
Dhaʽwan is mentioned in some historical sources from the 1600s, in connection with military actions in the 'Amran area. The first mention is in 1627 (1036 AH). The name is given as Bayt Dhaʽwan in the accounts of the early European travellers Hermann von Wissmann and Josef Werdecker.
