= Bani Asa'ad =

Bani Asa'ad بني أسعد
- Sub-district
- Country: Yemen
- Governorate: 'Amran Governorate
- District: Maswar District

Population (2004)
  - Total: 2,288
- Time zone: UTC+3

Bani Asa'ad (Arabic: بني أسعد) is a sub-district located in Maswar District, 'Amran Governorate, Yemen. Bani Asa'ad had a population of 2288 according to the 2004 census.
