= Utayfah =

Utayfah ناشر
- Sub-district
- Country: Yemen
- Governorate: 'Amran Governorate
- District: As Sudah District

Population (2004)
  - Total: 7,191
- Time zone: UTC+3

Utayfah (Arabic: عطيفة) is a sub-district located in As Sudah District, 'Amran Governorate, Yemen. Utayfah had a population of 7191 according to the 2004 census.
