= Bayt Zud =

- Village
- Location in Yemen
- Coordinates: 15.93035°N 44.02673°E
- Country: Yemen
- Governorate: Amran
- District: Maswar
- Elevation: 8,419 ft (2,566 m)
- Time zone: UTC+3 (Yemen Standard Time)

Bayt Zud (Bayt Zūd) is a village in Kharif District of 'Amran Governorate, Yemen.

== Name and history ==
According to the 10th-century writer al-Hamdani, Bayt Zud is named after Zuwad b. Sayf b. ʽAmr b. al-Sabīʽ, of the tribe of Hashid. He clarifies that Zūd, or Zuwad, was the Himyaritic form of the Arabic name Zayd. He also wrote that Bayt Zud had once been the site of a pre-Islamic palace. Bayt Zud is also mentioned several times in historical sources, including the Ghayat al-amani of Yahya ibn al-Husayn and the Sirat al-Hadi ila'l-Haqq of Ali ibn Muhammad al-Abbasi. (Note: Al-Hamdani also mentioned a second Bayt Zud, on Jabal Miswar, but the Ghayat al-amani and the Sirat are not referring to that place, which evidently no longer exists.)
