= Al-Sanatin and al-Ghail =

Al-Sanatin and al-Ghail السنتين والغيل
- Sub-district
- Country: Yemen
- Governorate: 'Amran Governorate
- District: Khamir District

Population (2004)
  - Total: 9,212
- Time zone: UTC+3

Al-Sanatin and al-Ghail (Arabic: السنتين والغيل) is a sub-district located in Khamir District, 'Amran Governorate, Yemen. Al-Sanatin and al-Ghail had a population of 9,212 according to the 2004 census.
