= Falayh =

Falayh فليح
- Sub-district
- Country: Yemen
- Governorate: 'Amran Governorate
- District: Suwayr District

Population (2004)
  - Total: 8,070
- Time zone: UTC+3

Falayh (Arabic: فليح) is a sub-district located in Suwayr District, 'Amran Governorate, Yemen. Falayh had a population of 8070 according to the 2004 census.
