= As Sunnatayn =

as-Sunnatayn السنتين
- Village
- Location in Yemen
- Coordinates: 15.96376°N 43.97109°E
- Country: Yemen
- Governorate: 'Amran
- District: Khamir
- Elevation: 8,430 ft (2,570 m)
- Time zone: UTC+3 (Yemen Standard Time)

As Sunnatayn (Arabic: السنتين as-Sunnatayn), also transliterated as al-Sinnatayn, is a village in Khamir District of 'Amran Governorate, Yemen. It is located a bit to the south of Khamir.

== History ==
Robert T.O. Wilson identified As Sunnatayn with the al-Sinnatān mentioned in the 10th century writer al-Hamdani in his geographic work Sifat Jazirat al-Arab. According to him, it is also referred to by Muhammad ibn Salah al-Sharafi as being adjacent to the territory of Bilad al-Kalbiyyin, although the reading is uncertain.
