= Sadan (Amran) =

Sadan صدان
- Sub-district
- Location in Yemen
- Country: Yemen
- Governorate: 'Amran Governorate
- District: Al Ashah District

Population (2004)
  - Total: 5,473
- Time zone: UTC+3

Sadan (Arabic: صدان) is a sub-district located in the Al Ashah District, 'Amran Governorate, Yemen. Sadan had a population of 5473 according to the 2004 census.
