= Hashif =

Hashif حاشف
- Sub-district
- Location in Yemen
- Country: Yemen
- Governorate: 'Amran Governorate
- District: Al Ashah District

Population (2004)
  - Total: 1,679
- Time zone: UTC+3

Hashif (Arabic: حاشف) is a sub-district located in Al Ashah District, 'Amran Governorate, Yemen. Hashif had a population of 1679 according to the 2004 census.
