= Dhu Khairan =

Dhu Khairan ذو خيران
- Sub-district
- Location in Yemen
- Country: Yemen
- Governorate: 'Amran Governorate
- District: Al Ashah District

Population (2004)
  - Total: 7,380
- Time zone: UTC+3

Dhu Khairan (Arabic: ذو خيران) is a sub-district located in the Al Ashah District, 'Amran Governorate, Yemen. Dhu Khairan had a population of 7380 according to the 2004 census.
