= Bani Ghuthaimah =

Bani Ghuthaimah بني غثيمة
- Sub-district
- Country: Yemen
- Governorate: 'Amran Governorate
- District: Bani Suraim District

Population (2004)
  - Total: 3,656
- Time zone: UTC+3

Bani Ghuthaimah (Arabic: بني غثيمة) is a sub-district located in Bani Suraim District, 'Amran Governorate, Yemen. Bani Ghuthaimah had a population of 3656 according to the 2004 census.
