= Al-Ajayrat =

Al-Ajayrat العجيرات
- Sub-district
- Country: Yemen
- Governorate: 'Amran Governorate
- District: As Sawd District

Population (2004)
  - Total: 1,235
- Time zone: UTC+3

Al-Ajayrat (Arabic: العجيرات) is a sub-district located in As Sawd District, 'Amran Governorate, Yemen. Al-Ajayrat had a population of 1235 according to the 2004 census.
