= Khyar =

Khyar خيار
- Sub-district
- Country: Yemen
- Governorate: 'Amran Governorate
- District: Bani Suraim District

Population (2004)
  - Total: 5,511
- Time zone: UTC+3

Khyar (Arabic: خيار) is a sub-district located in Bani Suraim District, 'Amran Governorate, Yemen. Khyar had a population of 5511 according to the 2004 census.
