= Bani al-Karibi =

Bani al-Karibi بني الكريبي
- Sub-district
- Country: Yemen
- Governorate: 'Amran Governorate
- District: Maswar District

Population (2004)
  - Total: 2,263
- Time zone: UTC+3

Bani al-Karibi (Arabic: بني الكريبي) is a sub-district located in Maswar District, 'Amran Governorate, Yemen. Bani al-Karibi had a population of 2263 according to the 2004 census.
