= Wada'a Hashid =

Wada'a Hashid وادعه حاشد
- Sub-district
- Location in Yemen
- Country: Yemen
- Governorate: 'Amran Governorate
- District: Bani Suraim District

Population (2004)
  - Total: 7,833
- Time zone: UTC+3

Wada'a Hashid (Arabic: وادعه حاشد) is a sub-district located in Bani Suraim District, 'Amran Governorate, Yemen. Wada'a Hashid had a population of 7833 according to the 2004 census.
