= Al-Amryain =

Al-Amryain العمريين
- Sub-district
- Country: Yemen
- Governorate: 'Amran Governorate
- District: As Sawd District

Population (2004)
  - Total: 1,596
- Time zone: UTC+3

Al-Amryain (Arabic: العمريين) is a sub-district located in As Sawd District, 'Amran Governorate, Yemen. Al-Amryain had a population of 1596 according to the 2004 census.
