= Al-Sudah =

Al-Sudah السودة
- Town
- Location in Yemen
- Coordinates: 15.95861°N 43.78083°E
- Country: Yemen
- Governorate: 'Amran
- District: As Sudah
- Elevation: 6,677 ft (2,035 m)
- Time zone: UTC+3 (Yemen Standard Time)

Al-Sudah, also As Sudah (Arabic: السودة al-Sūdah), is a town in 'Amran Governorate, Yemen. It is the seat of As Sudah District. It is a sizeable administrative center, located in the highlands west of Khamir.

== History ==
Al-Sudah is first mentioned in 1330 (730 AH), in the Ghayat al-amani of Yahya ibn al-Husayn. From then on it is mentioned frequently as a town and military stronghold, along with its fortress called Qarn al-Naʽi.
