= Al-Sarm =

Al-Sarm الصرم
- Sub-district
- Country: Yemen
- Governorate: 'Amran Governorate
- District: Thula District

Population (2004)
  - Total: 3,231
- Time zone: UTC+3

Al-Sarm (Arabic: الصرم) is a sub-district located in Thula District, 'Amran Governorate, Yemen. Al-Sarm had a population of 3231 according to the 2004 census.
