= Al-Dhaibah =

Al-Dhaibah الذيبة
- Sub-district
- Country: Yemen
- Governorate: 'Amran Governorate
- District: Suwayr District

Population (2004)
  - Total: 2,192
- Time zone: UTC+3

Al-Dhaibah (Arabic: الذيبة) is a sub-district located in Suwayr District, 'Amran Governorate, Yemen. Al-Dhaibah had a population of 2192 according to the 2004 census.
