= Sufyan (Amran) =

Sufyan سفيان
- Sub-district
- Location in Yemen
- Country: Yemen
- Governorate: 'Amran Governorate
- District: Dhi Bin District

Population (2004)
  - Total: 3,795
- Time zone: UTC+3

Sufyan (Arabic: سفيان) is a sub-district located in Dhi Bin District, 'Amran Governorate, Yemen. Sufyan had a population of 3795 according to the 2004 census.
