= Wadi Sufyan =

Wadi Sufyan وادي سفيان
- Sub-district
- Country: Yemen
- Governorate: 'Amran Governorate
- District: Harf Sufyan District

Population (2004)
  - Total: 3,568
- Time zone: UTC+3

Wadi Sufyan (Arabic: وادي سفيان) is a sub-district located in Harf Sufyan District, 'Amran Governorate, Yemen. Wadi Sufyan had a population of 3568 according to the 2004 census.
