= Khamis Harash =

Khamis Harash خميس هراش
- Sub-district
- Country: Yemen
- Governorate: 'Amran Governorate
- District: Kharif District

Population (2004)
  - Total: 10,822
- Time zone: UTC+3

Khamis Harash (Arabic: خميس هراش) is a sub-district located in Kharif District, 'Amran Governorate, Yemen. Khamis Harash had a population of 10822 according to the 2004 census.
