= Al-Amashyah =

Al-Amashyah العمشية
- Sub-district
- Country: Yemen
- Governorate: 'Amran Governorate
- District: Harf Sufyan District

Population (2004)
  - Total: 6,670
- Time zone: UTC+3

Al-Amashyah (Arabic: العمشية) is a sub-district located in Harf Sufyan District, 'Amran Governorate, Yemen. Al-Amashyah had a population of 6670 according to the 2004 census.
