= Dhu Ghaithan =

Dhu Ghaithan ذو غيثان
- Sub-district
- Country: Yemen
- Governorate: 'Amran Governorate
- District: Qaflat Othor District

Population (2004)
  - Total: 6,455
- Time zone: UTC+3

Dhu Ghaithan (Arabic: ذو غيثان) is a sub-district located in Qaflat Othor District, 'Amran Governorate, Yemen. Dhu Ghaithan had a population of 6455 according to the 2004 census.
