= Khaywan al-Hamra =

Khaywan al-Hamra خيوان الحمراء
- Sub-district
- Country: Yemen
- Governorate: 'Amran Governorate
- District: Harf Sufyan District

Population (2004)
  - Total: 3,568
- Time zone: UTC+3

Khaywan al-Hamra (Arabic: خيوان الحمراء) is a sub-district located in Harf Sufyan District, 'Amran Governorate, Yemen. Khaywan al-Hamra had a population of 3,568 according to the 2004 census.
