= Dhu Ali =

Dhu Ali ذو علي
- Sub-district
- Country: Yemen
- Governorate: 'Amran Governorate
- District: Huth District

Population (2004)
  - Total: 879
- Time zone: UTC+3

Dhu Ali (Arabic: ذو علي) is a sub-district located in Huth District, 'Amran Governorate, Yemen. Dhu Ali had a population of 879 according to the 2004 census.
