= Khamis al-Gudaymi =

Khamis al-Gudaymi خميس القديمي
- Sub-district
- Country: Yemen
- Governorate: 'Amran Governorate
- District: Kharif District

Population (2004)
  - Total: 14,459
- Time zone: UTC+3

Khamis al-Gudaymi (Arabic: خميس القديمي) is a sub-district located in Kharif District, 'Amran Governorate, Yemen. Khamis al-Gudaymi had a population of 14459 according to the 2004 census.
