= Huth Uzlah =

Huth حوث
- Sub-district
- Country: Yemen
- Governorate: 'Amran Governorate
- District: Huth District

Population (2004)
  - Total: 6,450
- Time zone: UTC+3

Huth (Arabic: حوث) is a sub-district located in Huth District, 'Amran Governorate, Yemen. Huth had a population of 6450 according to the 2004 census.
