= Khamis Hajur =

Khamis Hajur خميس حجور
- Sub-district
- Country: Yemen
- Governorate: 'Amran Governorate
- District: Habur Zulaymah District

Population (2004)
  - Total: 7,986
- Time zone: UTC+3

Khamis Hajur (Arabic: خميس حجور) is a sub-district located in Habur Zulaymah District, 'Amran Governorate, Yemen. Khamis Hajur had a population of 7986 according to the 2004 census.
