= Dhaifan =

Dhaifan ذيفان
- Sub-district
- Location in Yemen
- Country: Yemen
- Governorate: 'Amran Governorate
- District: Raydah District

Population (2004)
  - Total: 16,896
- Time zone: UTC+3

Dhaifan (Arabic: ذيفان) is a sub-district located in Raydah District, 'Amran Governorate, Yemen. Dhaifan had a population of 16896 according to the 2004 census.
