= Syran al-Sharqi =

Syran al-Sharqi سيران الشرقي
- Sub-district
- Country: Yemen
- Governorate: 'Amran Governorate
- District: Shaharah District

Population (2004)
  - Total: 5,832
- Time zone: UTC+3

Syran al-Sharqi (Arabic: سيران الشرقي) is a sub-district located in Shaharah District, 'Amran Governorate, Yemen. Syran al-Sharqi had a population of 5832 according to the 2004 census.
