= Al-Rahabin =

Al-Rahabin الرحبين
- Sub-district
- Country: Yemen
- Governorate: 'Amran Governorate
- District: As Sawd District

Population (2004)
  - Total: 2,041
- Time zone: UTC+3

Al-Rahabin (Arabic: الرحبين) is a sub-district located in As Sawd District, 'Amran Governorate, Yemen. Al-Rahabin had a population of 2041 according to the 2004 census.
