= Al-Maradha and Was'a =

Al-Maradha and Was'a المعراضه والواسع
- Sub-district
- Country: Yemen
- Governorate: 'Amran Governorate
- District: Al Ashah District

Population (2004)
  - Total: 9,105
- Time zone: UTC+3

Al-Maradha and Was'a (Arabic: المعراضه والواسع) is a sub-district located in Al Ashah District, 'Amran Governorate, Yemen. Al-Maradha and Was'a had a population of 9105 according to the 2004 census.
