= Bani Hajaj =

Bani Hajaj بني حجاج
- Sub-district
- Location in Yemen
- Coordinates: 15°35′41″N 43°58′10″E
- Country: Yemen
- Governorate: 'Amran Governorate
- District: Iyal Surayh District

Population (2004)
  - Total: 19,633
- Time zone: UTC+3

Bani Hajaj (Arabic: بني حجاج) is a sub-district located in Iyal Surayh District, 'Amran Governorate, Yemen. Bani Hajaj had a population of 19633 according to the 2004 census.
