= Al-Batnah =

Al-Batnah البطنة
- Sub-district
- Location in Yemen
- Coordinates: 16°11′16.84″N 43°50′14.28″E
- Country: Yemen
- Governorate: 'Amran Governorate
- District: Al Ashah District

Population (2004)
  - Total: 3,304
- Time zone: UTC+3

Al-Batnah (Arabic: البطنة) is a sub-district located in Al Ashah District, 'Amran Governorate, Yemen. Al-Batnah had a population of 3304 according to the 2004 census.
