= Al-Dhahir =

Al-Dhahir الظاهر
- Sub-district
- Country: Yemen
- Governorate: 'Amran Governorate
- District: Khamir District

Population (2004)
  - Total: 31,678
- Time zone: UTC+3

Al-Dhahir (Arabic: الظاهر) is a sub-district located in Khamir District, 'Amran Governorate, Yemen. Al-Dhahir had a population of 31,678 according to the 2004 census.
