= Qarhd and al-Fardat =

Qarhd and al-Fardat قرهد والفردات
- Sub-district
- Country: Yemen
- Governorate: 'Amran Governorate
- District: Al Ashah District

Population (2004)
  - Total: 2,623
- Time zone: UTC+3

Qarhd and al-Fardat (Arabic: قرهد والفردات) is a sub-district located in Al Ashah District, 'Amran Governorate, Yemen. Qarhd and al-Fardat had a population of 2623 according to the 2004 census.
