= Iyal Mawmar =

Iyal Mawmar عيال مومر
- Sub-district
- Country: Yemen
- Governorate: 'Amran Governorate
- District: Maswar District

Population (2004)
  - Total: 6,310
- Time zone: UTC+3

Iyal Mawmar (Arabic: عيال مومر) is a sub-district located in Maswar District, 'Amran Governorate, Yemen. Iyal Mawmar had a population of 6310 according to the 2004 census.
