= Syran al-Gharbi =

Syran al-Gharbi سيران الغربي
- Sub-district
- Country: Yemen
- Governorate: 'Amran Governorate
- District: Shaharah District

Population (2004)
  - Total: 16,503
- Time zone: UTC+3

Syran al-Gharbi (Arabic: سيران الغربي) is a sub-district located in Shaharah District, 'Amran Governorate, Yemen. Syran al-Gharbi had a population of 16503 according to the 2004 census.
