= Hamal (Amran) =

Hamal همل
- Sub-district
- Country: Yemen
- Governorate: 'Amran Governorate
- District: As Sawd District

Population (2004)
  - Total: 590
- Time zone: UTC+3

Hamal (Arabic: همل) is a sub-district located in As Sawd District, 'Amran Governorate, Yemen. Hamal had a population of 590 according to the 2004 census.
