= Qa'a (Amran) =

Qa'a قاعة
- Sub-district
- Location in Yemen
- Country: Yemen
- Governorate: 'Amran Governorate
- District: Al Ashah District

Population (2004)
  - Total: 2,754
- Time zone: UTC+3

Qa'a (Arabic: قاعة) is a sub-district located in Al Ashah District, 'Amran Governorate, Yemen. Qa'a had a population of 2754 according to the 2004 census.
