= Dhu Anash =

Dhu Anash ذو عناش
- Sub-district
- Country: Yemen
- Governorate: 'Amran Governorate
- District: Huth District

Population (2004)
  - Total: 2,293
- Time zone: UTC+3

Dhu Anash (Arabic: ذو عناش) is a sub-district located in Huth District, 'Amran Governorate, Yemen. Dhu Anash had a population of 2293 according to the 2004 census.
