= Al-Khamis Amran =

Al-Khamis الخميس
- Sub-district
- Country: Yemen
- Governorate: 'Amran Governorate
- District: Thula District

Population (2004)
  - Total: 3,700
- Time zone: UTC+3

Al-Khamis (Arabic: الخميس) is a sub-district located in Thula District, 'Amran Governorate, Yemen. Al-Khamis had a population of 3700 according to the 2004 census.
