= Khamis Bani Dahsh =

Khamis Bani Dahsh خميس بني دهش
- Sub-district
- Country: Yemen
- Governorate: 'Amran Governorate
- District: Habur Zulaymah District

Population (2004)
  - Total: 10,764
- Time zone: UTC+3

Khamis Bani Dahsh (Arabic: خميس بني دهش) is a sub-district located in Habur Zulaymah District, 'Amran Governorate, Yemen. Khamis Bani Dahsh had a population of 10764 according to the 2004 census.
