= Khamis Quhal =

Khamis Quhal خميس قهال
- Sub-district
- Country: Yemen
- Governorate: 'Amran Governorate
- District: Iyal Surayh District

Population (2004)
  - Total: 9,233
- Time zone: UTC+3

Khamis Quhal (Arabic: خميس قهال) is a sub-district located in Iyal Surayh District, 'Amran Governorate, Yemen. Khamis Quhal had a population of 9233 according to the 2004 census.
