= Bani Abd =

Bani Abd بني عبد
- Sub-district
- Location in Yemen
- Coordinates: 15°55′09″N 43°52′23″E
- Country: Yemen
- Governorate: 'Amran Governorate
- District: Iyal Surayh District

Population (2004)
  - Total: 7,496
- Time zone: UTC+3

Bani Abd (Arabic: بني عبد) is a sub-district located in Iyal Surayh District, 'Amran Governorate, Yemen. Bani Abd had a population of 7496 according to the 2004 census.
