= Bani Talq =

Bani Talq بني طلق
- Sub-district
- Country: Yemen
- Governorate: 'Amran Governorate
- District: As Sawd District

Population (2004)
  - Total: 3,170
- Time zone: UTC+3

Bani Talq (Arabic: بني طلق) is a sub-district located in As Sawd District, 'Amran Governorate, Yemen. Bani Talq had a population of 3170 according to the 2004 census.
