= Al-Hayrah =

Al-Hayrah الحيرة
- Sub-district
- Country: Yemen
- Governorate: 'Amran Governorate
- District: Harf Sufyan District

Population (2004)
  - Total: 3,360
- Time zone: UTC+3

Al-Hayrah (Arabic: الحيرة) is a sub-district located in Harf Sufyan District, 'Amran Governorate, Yemen. Al-Hayrah had a population of 3360 according to the 2004 census.
