= Bani Jaysh Al-Alla =

Bani Jaysh Al-Alla بني جيش الأعلى
- Sub-district
- Country: Yemen
- Governorate: 'Amran Governorate
- District: As Sawd District

Population (2004)
  - Total: 3,213
- Time zone: UTC+3

Bani Jaysh Al-Alla (Arabic: بني جيش الأعلى) is a sub-district located in As Sawd District, 'Amran Governorate, Yemen. Bani Jaysh Al-Alla had a population of 3213 according to the 2004 census.
