= Blad al-Janb =

Blad Janb بلاد جنب
- Sub-district
- Country: Yemen
- Governorate: 'Amran Governorate
- District: As Sawd District

Population (2004)
  - Total: 2,954
- Time zone: UTC+3

Blad Janb (Arabic: بلاد جنب) is a sub-district located in As Sawd District, 'Amran Governorate, Yemen. Blad al-Janb had a population of 2954 according to the 2004 census.
