= Shaharah Uzlah =

Shaharah شهارة
- Sub-district
- Country: Yemen
- Governorate: 'Amran Governorate
- District: Shaharah District

Population (2004)
  - Total: 4,141
- Time zone: UTC+3

Shaharah (Arabic: شهارة) is a sub-district located in Shaharah District, 'Amran Governorate, Yemen. Shaharah had a population of 4141 according to the 2004 census.
