= Bani Hanan and Al-Badou =

Bani Henan بني هنان
- Sub-district
- Country: Yemen
- Governorate: 'Amran Governorate
- District: As Sawd District

Population (2004)
  - Total: 4,959
- Time zone: UTC+3

Bani Hanan and Al-Badou (Arabic: بني هنان والبدو) is a sub-district located in As Sawd District, 'Amran Governorate, Yemen. Bani Hanan and Al-Badou had a population of 4959 according to the 2004 census.
