= Al-Sadedah =

Al-Sadedah الساددة
- Sub-district
- Country: Yemen
- Governorate: 'Amran Governorate
- District: Huth District

Population (2004)
  - Total: 594
- Time zone: UTC+3

Al-Sadedah (Arabic: الساددة) is a sub-district located in Huth District, 'Amran Governorate, Yemen. Al-Sadedah had a population of 594 according to the 2004 census.
