= Al-Ma'marh =

Al-Ma'marh المعامرة
- Sub-district
- Country: Yemen
- Governorate: 'Amran Governorate
- District: Huth District

Population (2004)
  - Total: 796
- Time zone: UTC+3

Al-Ma'marh (Arabic: المعامرة) is a sub-district located in Huth District, 'Amran Governorate, Yemen. Al-Ma'marh had a population of 796 according to the 2004 census.
