= Dharyi =

Dharyi ذري
- Sub-district
- Country: Yemen
- Governorate: 'Amran Governorate
- District: Shaharah District

Population (2004)
  - Total: 17,262
- Time zone: UTC+3

Dharyi (Arabic: ذري) is a sub-district located in Shaharah District, 'Amran Governorate, Yemen. Dharyi had a population of 17262 according to the 2004 census.
