= Hamadah =

Hamadah حمدة
- Sub-district
- Country: Yemen
- Governorate: 'Amran Governorate
- District: Raydah District

Population (2004)
  - Total: 10,994
- Time zone: UTC+3

Hamadah (Arabic: حمدة) is a sub-district located in Raydah District, 'Amran Governorate, Yemen. Hamadah had a population of 10994 according to the 2004 census.

Yemen
