= Ghurban =

Ghurban غربان
- Sub-district
- Country: Yemen
- Governorate: 'Amran Governorate
- District: Khamir District

Population (2004)
  - Total: 4,977
- Time zone: UTC+3

Ghurban (Arabic: غربان) is a sub-district located in Khamir District, 'Amran Governorate, Yemen. Ghurban had a population of 4977 according to the 2004 census.
