= Dhu Saylah =

Dhu Saylah ذو سيلة
- Sub-district
- Location in Yemen
- Country: Yemen
- Governorate: 'Amran Governorate
- District: Huth District

Population (2004)
  - Total: 1,074
- Time zone: UTC+3

Dhu Saylah (Arabic: ذو سيلة) is a sub-district located in Huth District, 'Amran Governorate, Yemen. Dhu Saylah had a population of 1074 according to the 2004 census.
