= Ahlabaluhssin =

Ahlabaluhssin اهلابا لحسين
- Sub-district
- Country: Yemen
- Governorate: 'Amran Governorate
- District: Khamir District

Population (2004)
  - Total: 7,824
- Time zone: UTC+3

Ahlabaluhssin (Arabic: اهلابا لحسين) is a sub-district located in Khamir District, 'Amran Governorate, Yemen. Ahlabaluhssin had a population of 7824 according to the 2004 census.
