= Bani Mahdi (Amran) =

Bani Mahdi بني مهدي
- Sub-district
- Country: Yemen
- Governorate: 'Amran Governorate
- District: Maswar District

Population (2004)
  - Total: 3,060
- Time zone: UTC+3

Bani Mahdi (Arabic: بني مهدي) is a sub-district located in Maswar District, 'Amran Governorate, Yemen. Bani Mahdi had a population of 3060 according to the 2004 census.
