= Thula Uzlah =

Thula ثلاء
- Sub-district
- Country: Yemen
- Governorate: 'Amran Governorate
- District: Thula District

Population (2004)
  - Total: 6,731
- Time zone: UTC+3

Thula (Arabic: ثلاء) is a sub-district located in Thula District, 'Amran Governorate, Yemen. Thula had a population of 6731 according to the 2004 census.
