= Wadi Adaf =

Wadi Adf وادي عدف
- Sub-district
- Country: Yemen
- Governorate: 'Amran Governorate
- District: Harf Sufyan District

Population (2004)
  - Total: 681
- Time zone: UTC+3

Wadi Adf (Arabic: وادي عدف) is a sub-district located in Harf Sufyan District, 'Amran Governorate, Yemen. Wadi Adf had a population of 681 according to the 2004 census.
