= Bani Jabr =

Bani Jabr بني جبر
- Sub-district
- Country: Yemen
- Governorate: 'Amran Governorate
- District: Dhi Bin District

Population (2004)
  - Total: 13,114
- Time zone: UTC+3

Bani Jabr (Arabic: بني جبر) is a sub-district located in Dhi Bin District, 'Amran Governorate, Yemen. Bani Jabr had a population of 13114 according to the 2004 census.
