= Dhi Bin =

Dhi Bin ذيبين
- Town
- Location in Yemen
- Coordinates: 15.97712°N 44.12917°E
- Country: Yemen
- Governorate: Amran
- District: Dhi Bin
- Elevation: 6,155 ft (1,876 m)
- Time zone: UTC+3 (Yemen Standard Time)

Dhi Bin (Arabic: ذيبين, romanized: Dhībīn), also spelled Dhibin or Dhaybin, is a small town in 'Amran Governorate, Yemen, and the seat of Dhi Bin District.

== Name and history ==
According to the 10th-century writer al-Hamdani, Dhi Bin is named after Dhu Bin b. Bakīr b. Nawfān, of the tribe of Hamdan. It was a moderately important site during the late medieval and early modern eras, and is mentioned frequently in Yahya ibn al-Husayn's historical account, the Ghayat al-amani.
