= Shaharah =

Shaharah شهارة
- Village
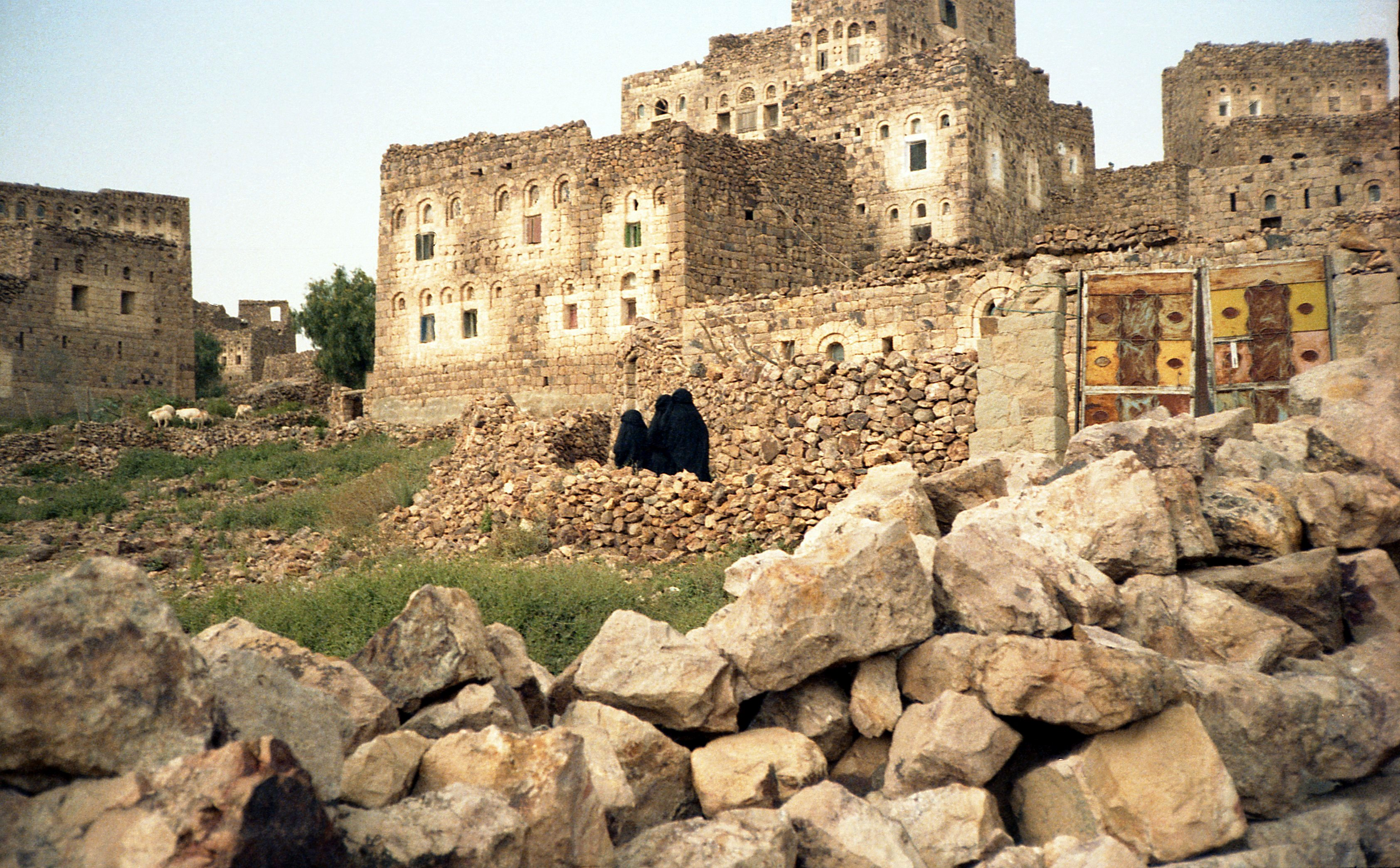
- Shaharah

- Location within Yemen
- Coordinates: 16°11′1″N 43°42′12″E
- Country: Yemen
- Governorate: 'Amran
- District: Shaharah
- Elevation: 2,600 m (8,500 ft)
- Time zone: UTC+3 (Yemen Standard Time)

Shaharah (Arabic: شهارة Shahārah) is a large mountain village and seat of Shaharah District of the 'Amran Governorate, Yemen. The village "lies at 2600 metres and overlooks mountainous bulging swells to the south and shimmering hot plains to the north." It lies on top a sharp mountain of the same name, Jabal Shaharah, which is a spur of Jabal al-Ahnum, with its sides and top under extensive cultivation. The village consists of several old stone houses and a cistern. The area is noted for its limestone arch footbridge, constructed in the 17th century by a local lord to connect two villages across a deep gorge.

Although historically Hashid territory, Shaharah and al-Ahnum is today Bakil territory. Shaharah has three gates: Bab al-Nahr, Bab al-Nasr, and Bab al-Saraw. The historical fortress of Shaharat al-Faysh is located to the east. The town is also called Shaharat al-Ra's due to its location at the mountain's summit.

== History ==
The town is associated with the pre-Islamic king As'ad al-Kamil. The amir Dhu'l-Sharafayn Muhammad ibn Ja'far, son of the imam al-Qasim ibn 'Ali al-'Ayyani (who died in 1085), made Shaharah his capital and was later buried here. The town was historically also known as Shaharat al-Amir after him. Another former name for the town was Mi'attiq.

The 10th-century author al-Hamdani mentions Shaharah as a mountain and fortress, and it appears in historical sources throughout the Middle Ages and early modern period. It was historically a center of learning and was home to several prominent jurists, scholars, and poets. It was especially important during the Yemeni-Ottoman conflicts of the 16th and 17th centuries, when it served as one of the most important strongholds in Yemen's western mountains. The Ottomans made multiple attempts to capture Shaharah, but they only succeeded once - in 1587 (995 AH) under the governor Mustafa Asim Pasha. Al-Mansur al-Qasim, the Zaydi Imam of Yemen, died at Shaharah in 1620 CE (1029 AH). Shaharah had served as his capital, and the town's congregational mosque is attributed to him.

The Ottomans attempted to besiege Shaharah in 1905 but were unsuccessful.

== Notable people ==
- Zaynab bint Muhammad al-Shahariyyah, a poet who died in 1702 (1114 AH), was from Shaharah; her poetry was never compiled into a diwan but has "a respectable place in Yemeni literature".

== Gallery ==
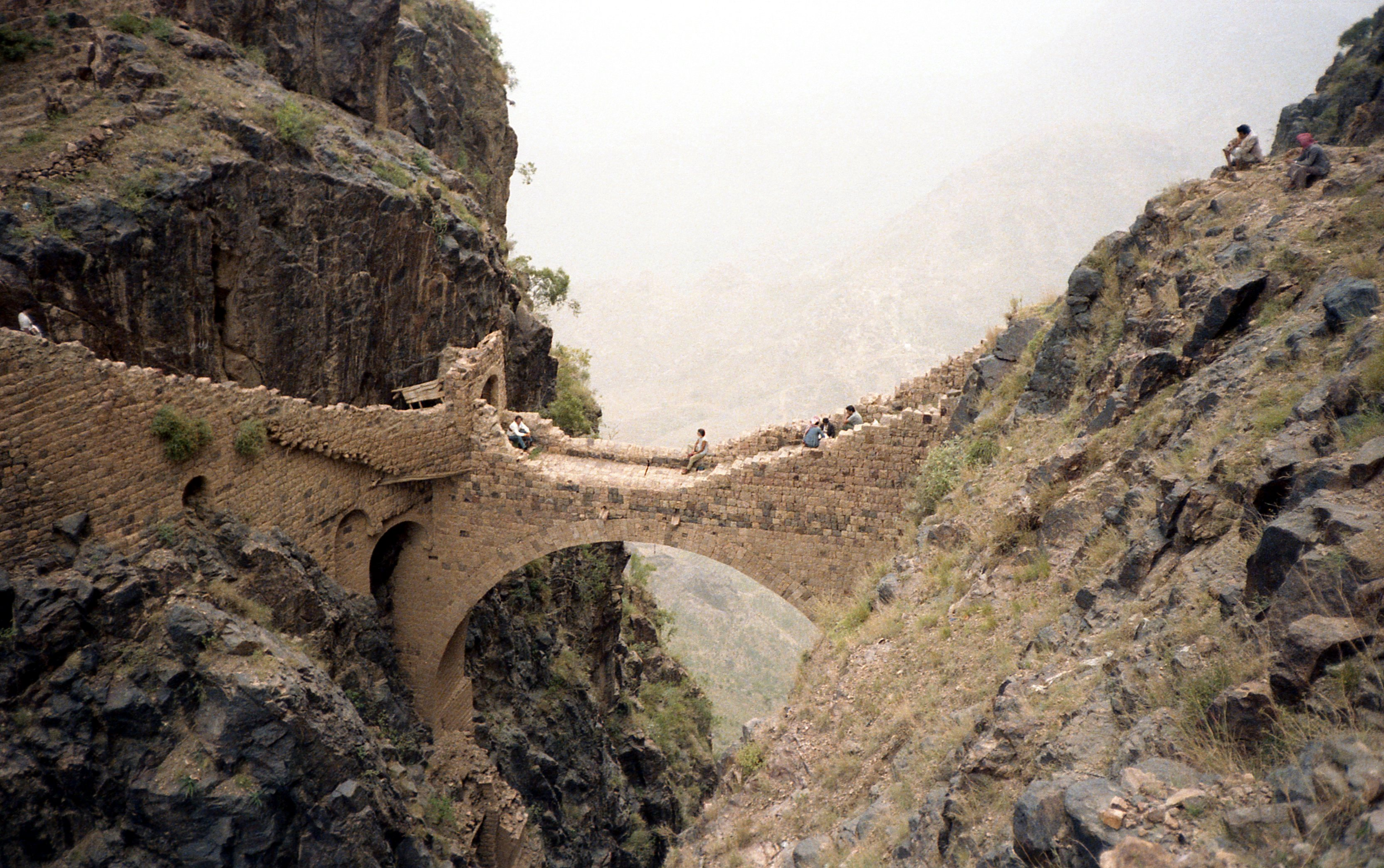

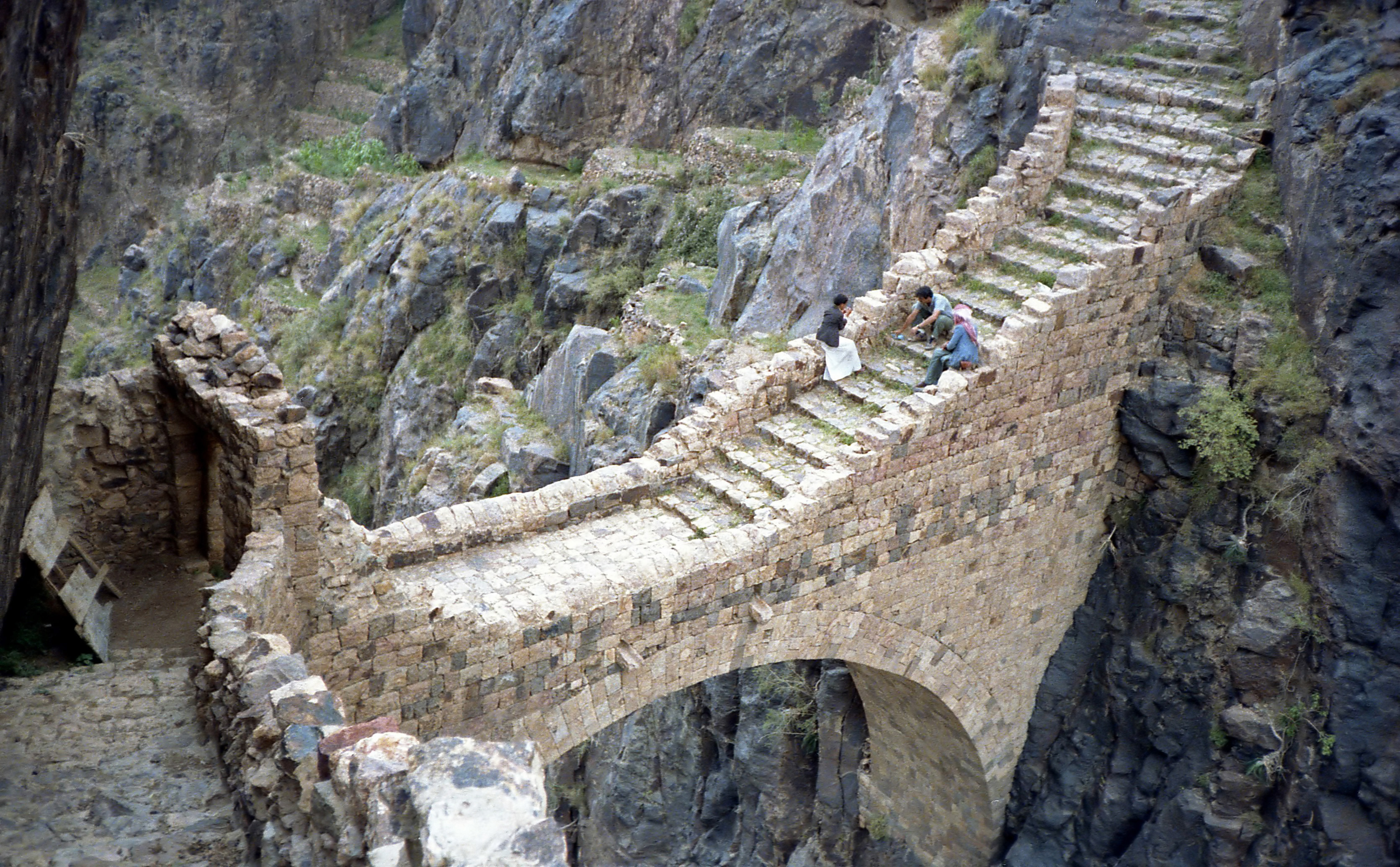

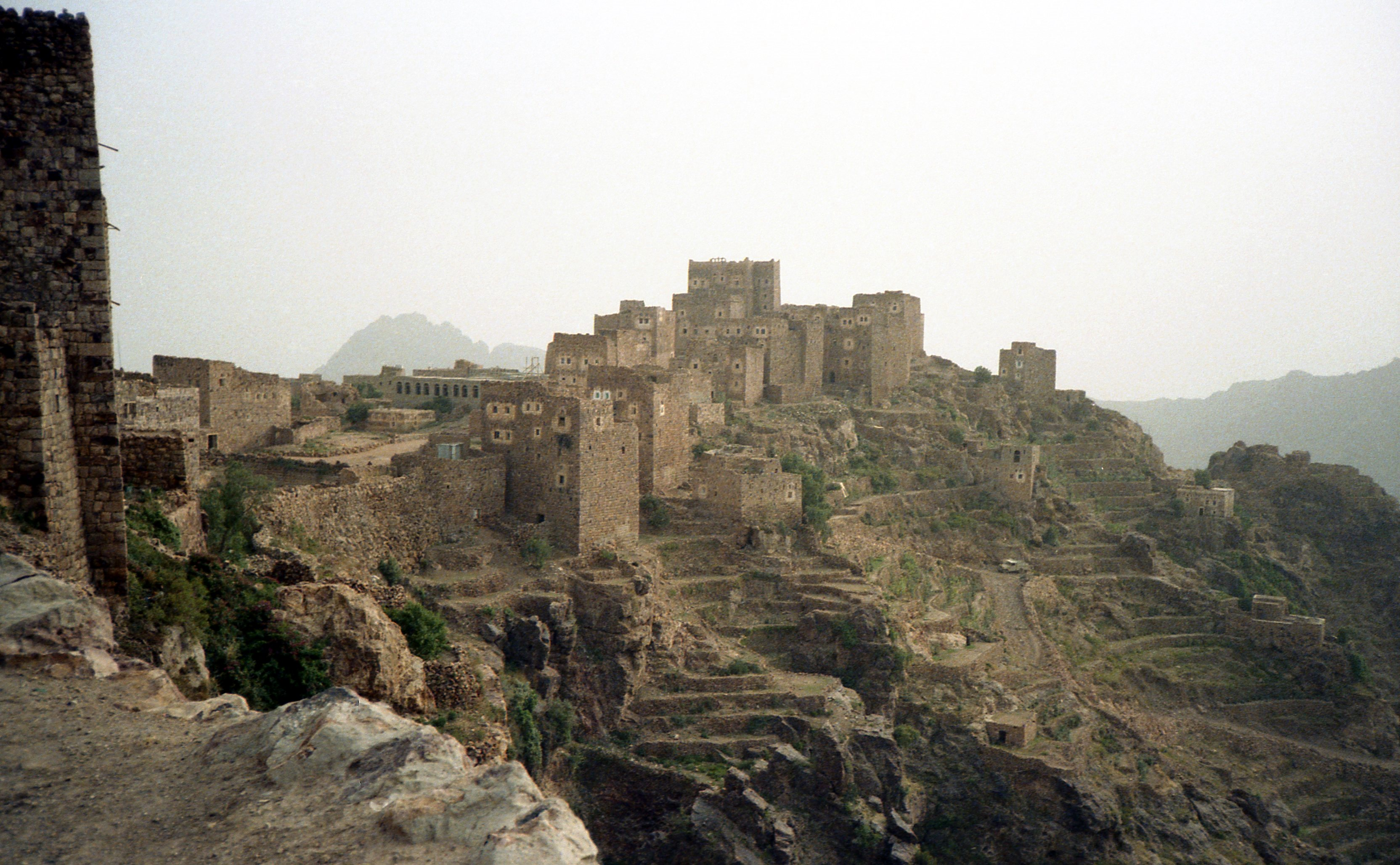
