= Al-Qaflah =

Al-Qaflah القفلة
- Sub-district
- Location in Yemen
- Coordinates: 16°20′17″N 43°42′11″E
- Country: Yemen
- Governorate: 'Amran Governorate
- District: Qaflat Othor District

Population (2004)
  - Total: 9,122
- Time zone: UTC+3

Al-Qaflah (Arabic: القفلة) is a sub-district located in Qaflat Othor District, 'Amran Governorate, Yemen. Al-Qaflah had a population of 9122 according to the 2004 census.
