= Bani Qais ('Amran) =

Bani Qais بنو قيس
- Sub-district
- Location in Yemen
- Coordinates: 16.116°N 44.032°E
- Country: Yemen
- Governorate: 'Amran Governorate
- District: Bani Suraim District

Population (2004)
  - Total: 12,044
- Time zone: UTC+3

Bani Qais (Arabic: بني قيس) is a sub-district located in Bani Suraim District, 'Amran Governorate, Yemen. Bani Qais had a population of 12044 according to the 2004 census.
