= Bayt ʽIdhaqah =

Bayt ʽIdhaqah بيت عذاقة
- Village
- Location in Yemen
- Coordinates: 15.61576°N 43.70228°E
- Country: Yemen
- Governorate: Amran
- District: Maswar
- Elevation: 8,448 ft (2,575 m)
- Time zone: UTC+3 (Yemen Standard Time)

Bayt ʽIdhaqah (Arabic: بيت عذاقة Bayt ʽIdhāqah) is a large village in 'Amran Governorate, Yemen, and the seat of Maswar District. It is the district's largest village and its principal market, with a souk meeting on Thursdays.

== Name ==
According to the 10th-century writer Abu Muhammad al-Hasan al-Hamdani, Bayt ‘Idhaqah is named after ‘Udhāqah b. Maswar b. ‘Amr b. Ma‘dī Karib al-Shammarī, of the tribe of Himyar. Many surrounding locations are said to derive their names from relatives of ‘Idhaqah. Robert T.O. Wilson spelled the name as Bayt ‘Udhaqah, but the name is "today universally pronounced ‘Idhaqah."

== History ==
Although the name is mentioned by al-Hamdani in the 10th century, Bayt ‘Idhaqah does not seem to have become a major settlement until the early modern period; it is not mentioned in other historical sources until the early 1600s. the jews in bayt idhaqah was important community. in the 20th century was Rabbi Israel Ozeri (in Hebrew ישראל עוזרי ) chief judge for jews and arabs.
