= Hassan ibn Yahya =

Yemeni politician (1908–2003)

Saif al-Islam Al-Hassan bin Yahya Hamid ad-Din
- الحسن بن يحيى حميد الدين
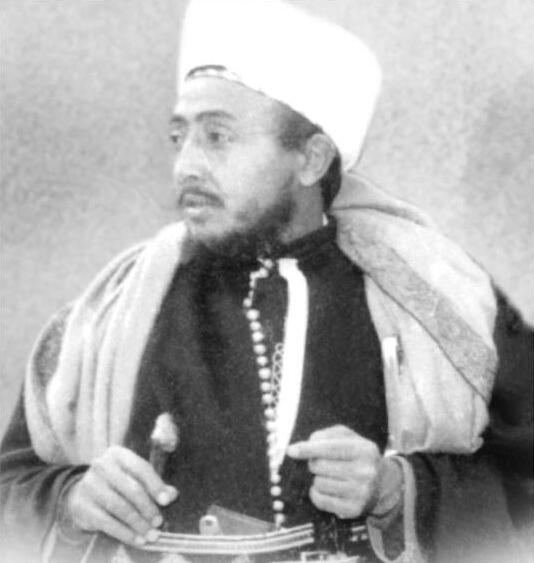

Prime Minister of the Mutawakkilite Kingdom of Yemen
- In office April 1948 – August 1955
- Monarch: Ahmad bin Yahya
- In office 1962–1967
- Monarch: Muhammad al-Badr (in exile)
- In office 1969–1970
- Monarch: Muhammad al-Badr (in exile)

Personal details
- Born: June 13, 1908
- Died: June 13, 2003 (aged 95)
- Parent: Yahya Muhammad Hamid ed-Din (father)

Al-Hassan Hamid al-Din ibn Yahya (13 June 1908 – 13 June 2003) was a Yemeni royal and statesman who served as the Prime Minister of the Mutawakkilite Kingdom of Yemen, once from April 1948 to August 1955, a second time from 1962 to 1967, and a third time from 1969 to 1970.

His title was Saif Al-Islam.

== Biography ==
He was born at Al-Qaflah, Hashid. Hassan ibn Yahya was the third eldest of the fourteen sons of King Yahya Muhammad Hamid ed-Din.

Before the assassination of his father in February 1948, he served as governor of the provinces of Ibb, Sana'a and Hodeida from 1938 to 1948.

During the 1948 coup attempt, he played a key role in rallying forces loyal to the dynasty in support of his brother Ahmad.

From April 1948 to June 1955, he held the positions of Viceroy and Prime Minister of the Kingdom of Yemen. After the coup attempt by his younger brother Abdullah, he was dismissed from his posts due to suspicions of supporting the coup.

From 1955 to 1962, Prince Hassan served as the Permanent Representative of the Kingdom of Yemen to the United Nations.

In this position, Prince Hassan vigorously defended his country's interests from the UN rostrum. On 23 January 1958, for instance, Prince Hassan stated that on 30 December British troops had carried out a new attack on Yemeni territory north of Aden. Protesting against British actions, Prince Hassan sent a memorandum to Secretary-General Dag Hammarskjöld.

=== Western perceptions (1958–1962) ===
Western observers viewed Prince Hassan as less militantly anti-Western than his nephew al-Badr. A 1958 CIA intelligence assessment noted that in a succession crisis, al-Badr would likely receive military support from Egypt and possibly Soviet intervention.

British and American officials discussed plans for a coup to replace Imam Ahmad with his brother Hassan, aiming to prevent al-Badr from coming to power. London viewed Imam Ahmad's friendship agreement with Moscow, his embrace of Arab nationalism and his son's pro-Soviet tilt as serious threats.

In February 1958, a British senior officer declared that "the ousting of the present regime must be carried out by local Yemenis, although it is clear that Hassan and his supporters enjoy substantial support from the Americans, alongside our support [the British], the Italians and King Saud".

In July 1958, William Luce, the governor of Aden, submitted a proposal to distribute 25,000 shotguns to tribes that supported Hassan. The British thus carried out interventionism in south-west Arabia to a greater degree than ever before.

According to Hatem al-Khalidi, the United States attempted to befriend Prince Hassan and orchestrate the assassination of Imam Ahmad and al-Badr. After Ahmad's death, however, the US State Department refused to intervene in support of Prince Hassan unless Yemen moved too far toward the Soviet Union.

=== Succession struggle ===
Imam Ahmad demanded that his brother Prince Hassan swear allegiance to al-Badr as his successor. Al-Badr lacked the support of most tribes; they preferred Hassan. During his governorship of the northern districts in the early 1950s, Hassan built a strong network of loyalties among the tribes. He used this network in his struggle with the imam. Ahmad tried to sideline Hassan by appointing him ambassador to the United Nations. The alliance between the Imamate and the Zaydi tribes crumbled, helping to bring about the revolution of 26 September 1962.

== Overthrow of the monarchy and Civil War ==
On 27 September 1962, military units led by Colonel Abdullah al-Sallal carried out a coup d'état and overthrew the traditional imamate, which had existed in the region for more than 1,000 years, either as an independent political entity or under formal Ottoman sovereignty.

After the overthrow of the monarchy in September 1962, on 28 September Prince Hassan went to the mountains in the north of the country. On 29 September, he declared his intention to return home and claim the 1,000-year-old family throne. On 30 September he moved to Saudi Arabia and felt confident enough to claim the imamate for himself. From there he called for an uprising against the republican authorities and the "Egyptian invaders". Prince Hassan stated that the uprising had been organized by a small group of officers without popular support and promised to suppress it.

In London, prince Hassan said he had no official information that his nephew al-Badr was dead as the rebels claimed. The Yemeni legation in London declared that Hassan was now the legal imam and king. In Frankfurt, the Yemeni envoy said he had received word through diplomatic channels that Hassan had been proclaimed the new king. The same envoy asserted that the rebellion had been provoked from the outside by a foreign power, which he did not name. A member of the Free Yemeni Movement in Cairo warned that if Hassan set foot on Yemeni soil, he would be killed. Middle Eastern broadcasts reported that Saif Al Islam Ismail, al-Badr's uncle, and Saif Al-Islam Mohammed Amin Ahmed, al-Badr's brother, were leading tribes against the rebels in Sana'a. Other reports said that Yemeni royal princes had sent their families to Saudi Arabia for shelter.

The Hamidaddin family sought to restore the monarchy in Yemen, but it is widely recognized that without Saudi support the Yemeni royalists would never have been able to offer significant resistance to the republican government, let alone sustain it for more than seven years. The same can be said about the republican government, which enjoyed massive military and political support from Egypt.

However, before Prince Hassan left New York, Jordan instructed its representative at the United Nations to convey its recognition of al-Hassan. During a stop in London, Prince Hassan declared: "I will restore order in Yemen. The people will rise up against the revolutionaries". The northern Yemeni tribes that supported al-Hassan sought to restore the imamate and the Hamidaddin monarchy.

On 28 September, by decision of the new authorities, 10 former government officials were executed, including former Foreign Minister Hassan bin Ibrahim. Abdullah al-Sallal ordered the execution of princes of the deposed dynasty, but failed to capture Prince al-Hassan, one of the most dangerous enemies of the new republican regime.

On 30 September al-Hassan arrived in Saudi Arabia, and on 5 October, having secured the support of King Saud bin Abdulaziz Al Saud, he announced the formation of a royalist government in exile. As head of the royalist government-in-exile, Prince Hassan became one of the principal political figures through whom the Yemeni royalist movement interacted with regional and international actors. The conflict rapidly evolved beyond a purely domestic struggle, drawing in Saudi Arabia as the chief supporter of the royalists and Egypt as the principal backer of the republican regime. The resulting confrontation transformed the Yemeni Civil War into a major arena of inter-Arab rivalry and attracted the attention of both the United Nations and the United States, which sought to prevent a wider regional escalation.

He immediately began sending princes of the royal family to the northern Yemeni tribes, offering them gold and weapons in exchange for loyalty. In early October, Jordan sent a mission to Jeddah to provide military support to the Yemeni royalists. Jordan also organized arms supplies for the Yemeni royalists.

On 4 October 1962, the Yemeni legation in Amman announced that the eastern and northern tribes had joined Prince Hassan and claimed that Sana'a would soon be encircled.

Immediately after the coup, Prince Hassan ibn Yahya was proclaimed the new King of Yemen. However, once it became known that the deposed King Muhammad al-Badr had survived the coup, on 16 October Prince Hassan renounced his claims to the throne and recognized al-Badr as the legitimate monarch of the country.

Mecca radio reported that al-Badr had set up headquarters near Hajja, about 70 miles northeast of Sana'a, and was massing forces to overthrow the rebel regime. Hassan relinquished his claims to the throne after being named royal premier.

Notably, before the fate of the deposed Imam al-Badr was clarified, Saudi Radio Mecca reported: "100,000 Yemeni warriors are ready to support King Hassan". In response, Abdullah al-Sallal declared: "We are ready for war. If necessary, we will transfer the war to Saudi Arabia as well".

On 8 October 1962, the Yemeni legation in Washington reported that it had received a message from Prince Hassan that his troops would soon surround Sana'a, while royalist sources in Amman claimed that Wadi Ahmed al-Siagi had entered North Yemen to join Hassan. The reports further stated that al-Siagi would head the royalist government as premier, while Hassan concentrated on securing tribal backing and organizing a military campaign against the republican regime.

On 12 October, the Foreign Minister of the "old regime" stated that royalist forces had captured three Soviet officers who, according to him, had helped the rebels seize power on 27 September.

In mid-October 1962, according to the Egyptian Middle East News Agency, Imam al-Badr, who had suffered a serious leg injury during the coup, was in an American hospital in Dhahran. According to Radio Amman, Imam al-Badr sent a message to jordanian king Hussein I condemning Nasser's interference in Yemen's internal affairs. On the other hand, the Egyptian newspaper Al-Ahram reported that al-Badr had stated he was abandoning all political activity. At the same time, Egypt spread information that Prince Hassan himself had been killed at the front in Marib and buried in the Protectorate of Lahij.

On 19 October 1962, Sana'a radio announced the death of Crown Prince Hassan. The Yemen Arab Republic government ordered his property and that of fifteen other members of the royal family confiscated, an approximate total of 40,000 acres. On the same day, Sana'a radio also reported that a revolutionary high court had sentenced Prince Hassan and thirteen other members of the royal family to death in absentia. The sentences were confirmed by President Abdullah al-Sallal. The court also declared their passports invalid. Radio Mecca reported that Hassan and the other royal family members were outside Yemen.

During the North Yemen Civil War, many members of the royal family took an active part in the fight against the republican government. Prince Hassan served as Prime Minister of the government in exile (1962–1967 and 1969–1970). Prince Abdul Rahman bin Yahya was Deputy Prime Minister and one of the commanders of the royalist forces.

The royalists used a strategy of wearing down the enemy. As Prince Hassan stated: "...our current tactic is to surround the cities without entering them. This saves the civilian population from heavy losses. This prolongs the war, but will not prevent us from achieving our ultimate goal..."

The conflict drew in outside powers because of their broader alliances. Saudi Arabia, the main royalist backer, was closely linked to the United States, while Egypt, which supported the republicans, was aligned with the Soviet Union. Washington wanted to restore stability in the oil-rich region and improve its standing with non-monarchical Arab regimes. The UN Secretary-General also worked to contain the fighting.

In April 1963, Saudi Arabia and Egypt reached a disengagement agreement. Saudi Arabia promised to suspend aid to the royalists and stop using its territory for their cause. Egypt promised to withdraw its troops from Yemen, estimated at between 15,000 and 30,000. A demilitarized zone was established along the Saudi-Yemeni border, extending 12 miles on each side. Observers were to monitor compliance. A month later, the UN agreed to provide the observers. The parties shared the cost equally for an initial two-month period. The Soviet Union insisted on Security Council authorization but did not veto the proposal.

On 15 September 1964, the representative of the Yemeni royalists in the United States, Bushrod Howard, called on the United States to hold the United Arab Republic responsible for implementing its new agreement with Saudi Arabia on the future of Yemen. Bushrod Howard, speaking on behalf of the "Government of the Kingdom of Yemen", which the United States no longer recognized, called the agreement "the third and most realistic attempt" to end the hostilities in Yemen. According to Howard, the royalists had always recognized the need for a ceasefire to allow Egyptian armed forces to carry out a "dignified withdrawal" of their military units from Yemen. After such a withdrawal, he added, the royalists would agree to hold a plebiscite on the form of government. Howard stated that countries other than Saudi Arabia, and especially the United States, should warn Cairo that violation of the new agreement would lead to serious and immediate sanctions. The reason for Washington's cool attitude toward Prince Hassan was that during his tenure as Yemen's representative to the UN, he usually voted against the United States and together with the Soviet bloc.

The UN Yemen Observer Mission (UNYOM) began its work on 4 July 1963. Its purpose was to verify that both sides were keeping their promises. Neither Saudi Arabia nor Egypt trusted the other, and neither could monitor the other's actions directly. The royalists controlled much of the countryside near the Saudi border, so Egypt could not watch cross-border traffic. Saudi Arabia, in turn, had no way to track Egyptian troop movements.

UNYOM had a Yugoslav reconnaissance unit of just over 100 officers and men, and a Canadian air unit with eight reconnaissance planes (about 50 personnel). Six military observers were stationed in Hodeida, the main port, and in Sanaa, the capital and site of a military airfield. Egyptian troops moving in or out of the country would likely pass through these centres, so their withdrawal was expected to be easy to verify.

The mission started well. After UNYOM arrived, Egyptian troops appeared to decrease and Saudi support for the royalists seemed to lessen. The parties agreed to extend funding for another two months. But soon Egypt began increasing its support for the republicans. Saudi Arabia refused to pay for a further extension but agreed under American pressure. The mission was then reduced: the Yugoslav unit was withdrawn, reconnaissance planes were cut to two, and the number of military observers was increased to 21 from nine countries. UNYOM was given a civilian head.

By April 1964, some estimates placed Egyptian troop numbers in Yemen at about 40,000. UNYOM had no visible effect on the war. At the end of August 1964, Saudi Arabia refused to pay again and was not pressed to change its mind. Egypt did not object to ending the mission. UNYOM was wound up on 4 September 1964.

Egypt had misjudged the situation when it signed the disengagement agreement. It underestimated tribal support for the royalists and overestimated the strength of the republican regime. It reneged on its promise to withdraw. Egypt did not change its position until its defeat in the Arab-Israeli war of June 1967. The UN mission in Yemen showed that peacekeeping works only when the parties want it to. UNYOM's job was to confirm that Egypt and Saudi Arabia were keeping their promises. When Egypt decided that its promise was unwise, no observer mission could save the agreement. The disengagement agreement collapsed because one of the main parties withdrew its cooperation.

In March 1967, a new agreement on the formation of an anti-Egyptian front between Yemeni royalists and republican dissidents caused disagreements within the royalist ranks, although it was approved by leading members of the royal family.

In August 1967, Prince Hassan al-Hussein, commander of the royalist forces, stated that Russians in Egyptian uniforms were in Yemen, manning artillery. He claimed that several Soviet soldiers had been killed. In early December, when the siege of Sana'a began, the royalists claimed to have shot down a Soviet Air Force captain flying a MiG-17 who had received instructions from the Soviet Ministry of Defense. The pilot died from his wounds. The U.S. State Department reported that this claim was "largely correct", although the YAR and USSR leadership immediately denied it. According to some reports, Soviet pilots were quickly replaced by Syrian and other Arab pilots, including some Yemeni pilots who had been trained in the Soviet Union.

One of the goals of the Soviet advisers may have been to counteract attempts at negotiations that could lead to a settlement with the royalists; such a settlement could only reduce the republicans' dependence on the USSR (which did indeed happen after the end of the war). In early 1966, when the Jeddah agreement was on the verge of collapse, The Times reported that Soviet advisers in Yemen were urging the regime not to compromise with the royalists.

On 2 September 1967, the first reaction of the royalists to the agreement on Yemen was recorded in Beirut, where the 23-year-old prince (emir) Hassan el-Hussein, "commander of the eastern sector", accompanied by Mohammed Wazir (State Minister of Foreign Affairs of the royalist government) and the royalist representative in the United States Bushrod Howard, met with three representatives of the foreign press. The prince, speaking on behalf of his uncle Imam al-Badr, insisted that his government could not agree to any settlement of the Yemeni conflict, regardless of its content and terms, unless the Egyptian expeditionary forces left Yemen. The prince added: "After the withdrawal of Egyptian forces, we can consider a solution to the conflict." Until then, the Imam's supporters refused to sign any agreement. In short, the royalists wanted to test the good faith of the Egyptians before initiating a peace process that would begin détente and normalization. Emir Hassan el-Hussein claimed that "hostilities in Yemen have never ceased and that in the last two weeks they have resumed on a very large scale." It was reported that in late October a battle took place in Arin "in which, according to him, from one hundred to two hundred Soviet soldiers fought alongside several hundred Egyptians." According to the royalists, the Soviets lost 18 soldiers.

According to the emir, Moscow intended to create a naval base in Mocha and a military training camp for the partisans of the Front for the Liberation of Occupied South Yemen, which was leading the struggle in the Federation of South Arabia. Finally, the emir stated that there were many Chinese specialists in the republican sector, but they were engaged in peaceful tasks such as repairing and improving roads and setting up textile factories.

On 27 July 1969, a high-ranking member of the former ruling family – Prince Abdullah bin Hassan, who was an important commander of the Yemeni royalists, was killed in battles with the republicans.

After the signing of the peace treaty, which established an amnesty for the royalists, in March 1969 he left Yemen together with Imam al-Badr.

Hassan ibn Yahya died in exile in Jeddah in 2003 and was buried in Medina.

== Honours ==
- Knight Grand Cross of the Order of Merit of the Italian Republic (13 January 1953).

== Bibliography ==
- Rabi, Uzi (2015). Yemen: Revolution, Civil War and Unification. Library of Modern Middle East Studies. I.B. Tauris. ISBN 978-1780769462.
- Bidwell, Robin (1983). The Two Yemens (1st ed.). Westview Press. ISBN 978-0865312951.
- El-Khalidi, Hatem (2011). Sojourn in a Dreadful Land (Yemen Chronicles). Dorrance Publishing Company, Incorporated. ISBN 9781434911971.
- Noring, Nina J.; LaFantasie, Glenn W., eds. (1995). "51. Paper by the Person in charge of Arabian Peninsula Affairs (Seelye), September 20, 1962". Foreign Relations of the United States, 1961–1963, Volume XVIII, Near East, 1962–1963. Washington, DC: United States Government Printing Office.
- Mawby, Spencer (2005). British Policy in Aden and the Protectorates, 1955-1967: Last Outpost of a Middle East Empire. British Politics and Society (1st ed.). Routledge. ISBN 978-0714654591.
- "366. Special National Intelligence Estimate: SNIE 36.8–58: The Yemen Situation". Foreign Relations of the United States, 1958–1960, Near East Region; Iraq; Iran; Arabian Peninsula. Vol. XII. Washington, DC: United States Government Printing Office. November 12, 1958.
- Orkaby, Asher Aviad (2014). The International History of the Yemen Civil War, 1962-1968 (Doctoral dissertation). Harvard University.
- James, Alan (1990). Peacekeeping in International Politics. Studies in International Security (1990th ed.). Palgrave Macmillan. ISBN 978-0333539323.
- "Africa Diary". The Journal of African History. 7 (3). Cambridge University Press. 1966. JSTOR i209396.
- Porter, Bruce D. (1984). The USSR in Third World Conflicts: Soviet Arms and Diplomacy in Local Wars 1945-1980. Cambridge University Press. ISBN 978-0-521-31064-2.
- Guldescu, Stanko (July 1966). "Yemen: The War and the Haradh Conference". The Review of Politics. 28 (3). Cambridge University Press: 319–331. doi:10.1017/S0034670500007129. JSTOR 1405590.
- O'Ballance, Edgar (1971). The War in the Yemen. Archon Books. ISBN 0571089100.
- Peterson, J.E. (2017). Yemen: The Search for a Modern State. Routledge Library Editions: The Gulf (1st ed.). Routledge. ISBN 978-1138184367.
- Mubarez, A. M. (1992). Foreign policy making in the Yemen Arab Republic civil war period: A study of four major decisions (Doctoral thesis). London School of Economics and Political Science.
- Keesing's Contemporary Archives. Vol. 14. London: Keesing's Publications. 1963–1964.
- Rahmy, Ali Abdel Rahman (1983). The Egyptian Policy in the Arab World: Intervention in Yemen 1962-1967. Washington, DC: University Press of America, Inc. ISBN 0819129976.
- Terrill, W. Andrew (2011). The Conflicts in Yemen and U.S. National Security. Strategic Studies Institute, US Army War College. JSTOR resrep11758. JSTOR.
- Long, David E.; Reich, Bernard (1995). The Government and Politics of the Middle East and North Africa (3rd ed.). Westview Press. ISBN 9780813321264.
- Little, Tom (1968). South Arabia: Arena of Conflict. Praeger. ISBN 9780269992957.
- El Mallakh, Ragaei (2014). The Economic Development of the Yemen Arab Republic. Routledge Library Editions: Economy of Middle East. Routledge. ISBN 9781138814233.
- Smiley, David; Kemp, Peter (1975). Arabian Assignment. Cooper. ISBN 9780850521818.
- Rashid, Ibrahim, ed. (1985). Yemen Under the Rule of Imam Ahmad. The Yemen Series. Vol. 7. Documentary Publications. ISBN 978-0-89712-059-3.
- Schmidt, Dana Adams (1968). Yemen: The Unknown War. Bodley Head. ISBN 9780370004112.
