= Zud (disambiguation) =

Zud is a massive dying of livestock due to impossibility of grazing in Asian steppe areas.

Zud or ZUD may also refer to:

- Pupelde Airfield in Chile (IATA airport code ZUD)
- Zud Schammel (1910-1973), American football player
- Bayt Zud, a village in Yemen
