= Bani Mansour (Amran) =

Bani Mansour بني منصور
- Sub-district
- Country: Yemen
- Governorate: 'Amran Governorate
- District: As Sudah District

Population (2004)
  - Total: 10,092
- Time zone: UTC+3

Bani Mansour (Arabic: بني منصور) is a sub-district located in As Sudah District, 'Amran Governorate, Yemen. Bani Mansour had a population of 10092 according to the 2004 census.
