= Maraba =

Maraba may refer to:

- Marabá, Pará, a municipality (município) in the state of Pará in Brazil
- Marabá Paulista, a municipality in the state of São Paulo in Brazil
- Maraba, Rwanda, a location in southern Rwanda
- Maraba Coffee, a fairtrade coffee produced in the Maraba area of Rwanda
- Maraba, Nasarawa state, the border between Abuja and nasarawa state Nigeria
- Ma'ariya: 1596 name of this Syrian village

== See also ==
- Marhaba
- Marhabah
