= Bani Malek =

Bani Malek بني مالك
- Sub-district
- Country: Yemen
- Governorate: 'Amran Governorate
- District: Bani Suraim District

Population (2004)
  - Total: 3,654
- Time zone: UTC+3

Bani Malek (Arabic: بني مالك) is a sub-district located in Bani Suraim District, 'Amran Governorate, Yemen. Bani Malek had a population of 3654 according to the 2004 census.
