= Hamidah, Yemen =

Hamidah حمدة
- Village
- Location in Yemen
- Coordinates: 15°49′57″N 43°57′59″E
- Country: Yemen
- Governorate: 'Amran
- District: Raydah
- Elevation: 7,260 ft (2,213 m)
- Time zone: UTC+3 (Yemen Standard Time)

Hamidah (Arabic: حمدة Ḥamidah), historically known as Hamudah, is a village and administrative sub-division ('uzlah) in Raydah District of 'Amran Governorate, Yemen. It is located on a small plain that sticks out to the west of the al-Bawn from a point just north of Raydah.

== History ==
Hamidah is an ancient settlement, with its name mentioned in several old Himyaritic inscriptions. It is mentioned in several historical sources including the Iklil and the Sifat Jazirat al-Arab, both by al-Hamdani, the Ghayat al-amani of Yahya ibn al-Husayn, the Sirat al-Hadi ila'l-Haqq of al-Abbasi, the Kitab al-Simt of Muhammad ibn Hatim al-Yami al-Hamdani, and the Muʽjam ma'staʽjam of al-Bakri. Hamidah was not the site of any major historical events, although it is mentioned in Jewish historical writings as a place where the Imam Al-Mahdi Ahmad ordered the destruction of a synagogue in the year 1678 of the Common Era.
