= Marhabah =

Marhabah مرهبة
- Sub-district
- Country: Yemen
- Governorate: 'Amran Governorate
- District: Dhi Bin District

Population (2004)
  - Total: 13,890
- Time zone: UTC+3

Marhabah (Arabic: مرهبة) is a sub-district located in Dhi Bin District, 'Amran Governorate, Yemen. Marhabah had a population of 13890 according to the 2004 census.
