= Durgham Al-Maliki =

Iraqi politician

Durgham Al-Malik
- Sheikh of Bani Malik
- Born: 1987 (age 38–39); Al-Qurnah, Basra Governorate, Iraq
- Spouse: Married
- House: Bani Malik
- Father: Sabah Armash Al-Maliki
- Religion: Islam
- Occupation: Tribal leader, Politician

Durgham Sabah Abdul Mohsen Armash Al-Maliki (Arabic: ضرغام صباح عبد المحسن عرمش المالكي; born 1987) is an Iraqi politician, tribal leader, and member of the Council of Representatives of Iraq representing Basra Governorate. He is known as a leader of the Bani Malik tribe in southern Iraq and is affiliated with the State of Law Coalition.

== Early life ==
Al-Maliki was born in 1987 in Al-Qurna, Basra Governorate, Iraq. He belongs to the Bani Malik tribe, one of the major Arab tribal groups in southern Iraq.

== Tribal leadership ==
Following the death of tribal leader Sheikh Sabah Armash Al-Maliki, Al-Maliki emerged as a leading figure within the Bani Malik tribe. Iraqi media outlets have referred to him as "Sheikh of Bani Malik" and "General Sheikh of Bani Malik" in coverage of political and tribal affairs in Basra.

== Political career ==
Al-Maliki was elected to the Iraqi Council of Representatives in the 2021 parliamentary election, representing Basra Governorate's fifth electoral district. He received 11,674 votes and entered parliament as part of the State of Law Coalition.

He serves on the Parliamentary Committee for Oil, Gas and Natural Resources, participating in legislative and oversight activities related to Iraq's energy sector.

== Public positions ==
Al-Maliki has commented on issues concerning governance, public services, tribal affairs, and development in Basra Governorate. His statements on local administration and public policy have received coverage in Iraqi media outlets.

== Personal life ==
Al-Maliki is married and holds a diploma qualification.
