= Bani Malik =

Bani Malik may refer to:

- Bani Malik (tribe)
- Bani Malik (Ibb), Yemen

== See also ==
- Bani Malek, Yemen
