= Jabal Din =

Mountain in Yemen

- Location within Yemen Location within Middle East Location within Asia

Highest point
- Elevation: 2,961 m (9,715 ft)
- Coordinates: 15.59583°N 44.04472°E

Jabal Ḍin, or Jabal Ẓin, is a distinct cone-shaped mountain in Yemen. It is located at the northern end of the Sanaa plain, just east of the road from Sanaa to 'Amran. Of volcanic origin, it marks the high point between the Sanaa plain and the al-Bawn plain. Regarded as a sacred site since pre-Islamic times, Jabal Din points approximately to Mecca when viewed from Sanaa. Thus, according to tradition, the Islamic prophet Muhammad instructed that the people of Sanaa should use Jabal Din as the reference point for the qibla. There are pre-Islamic ruins at Jabal Din's summit, which are said to be the tomb of Qudam ibn Qadim. The mountain does not appear to have been fortified during the Islamic period.
