= Zaynab bint Muhammad al-Shahariyyah =

Yemeni writer

- زينب الشهارية
- Born: Shaharah, Yemen
- Died: 1702
- Occupations: Poet, lawyer

Zaynab bint Muhammad al-Shahariyyah, in Arabic: زينب الشهارية (died 1702) was a Yemeni poet and Sufi writer, who was born in the city of Shaharah. She studied science and logic, as well as astronomy and literature. Her poetry is recorded in a literary letter to her first husband Ali bin Imam Al-Mutawakkil Ismail, as well as in a collection of sixteen works collated alongside a biography of her life by Abdul Salam al-Wajeeh. Her poetry shows her political influence; she practiced law in later life. Her works have been compared to those of other notable women poets, including Mehr Khatun and Fatima bint Mahmoud. Whilst her works were not compiled into a diwan they do have "a respectable place in Yemeni literature".
