= Khamir, Yemen =

Khamir خمر
- City
- Location in Yemen
- Coordinates: 15°59′20″N 43°57′32″E
- Country: Yemen
- Governorate: 'Amran Governorate

Population (2004)
  - Total: 18,645
- Time zone: UTC+3 (Yemen Standard Time)

Khamir (Arabic: خمر, romanized: Khamir) is a small city in the 'Amran Governorate of Yemen. It is the seat of Khamir District. It is now closely associated with the tribal confederation of Hashid, although it is named after a member of the Bakil tribe and was historically mainly a Bakil town.

== Name and history ==
According to the 10th-century writer al-Hamdani, Khamir was named after one Khamir ibn Dawman ibn Bakil, of the Bakil tribe, who Hamdani described as "a king who built palaces in the Zahir of Hamdan." Hamdani specified that the city's name referred to the fact that it was inhabited by "the sons of Khamir"; he wrote that, during his lifetime, the town was mostly inhabited by members of Bakil. He described its pre-Islamic ruins and wrote that the king As'ad al-Kamil was born here.

During the Middle Ages, the main north–south highway in the area bypassed Khamir to the east, so the city is absent from most historical accounts of the period. Its first mention in the Ghayat al-amani of Yahya ibn al-Husayn is in the year 1398 (800 AH); the text mentions that some of its houses had Himyarite foundations that could not be destroyed. Khamir is mentioned more frequently from the late 16th century onward, when it was frequently used as a base by armies in the region.
