= Bani Qais (Ibb) =

Bani Qais بني قيس
- Sub-district
- Location in Yemen
- Coordinates: 14°15′33″N 44°36′03″E
- Country: Yemen
- Governorate: Ibb Governorate
- District: Ar Radmah District

Population (2004)
  - Total: 13,255
- Time zone: UTC+3
- Geocode: 8735301

Bani Qais (Arabic: بني قيس) is a sub-district located in al-Radmah District, Ibb Governorate, Yemen. Bani Qais had a population of 13,255 according to the 2004 census.
