= Bani Mansour (Sanaa) =

Bani Mansour (Sanaa) بني منصور
- Sub-district
- Location in Yemen
- Coordinates: 15°04′15″N 43°52′21″E
- Country: Yemen
- Governorate: Sana'a Governorate
- District: Al Haymah Al Kharijiyah District

Population (2004)
  - Total: 2,584
- Time zone: UTC+3

Bani Mansour (Sanaa) (Arabic: بني منصور) is a sub-district located in the Al Haymah Al Kharijiyah District, Sana'a Governorate, Yemen. Bani Mansour (Sanaa) had a population of 2584 according to the 2004 census.
