= Bani Qais (Sanaa) =

Bani Qais بني قيس
- Sub-district
- Location in Yemen
- Coordinates: 15.13466°N 44.08542°E
- Country: Yemen
- Governorate: Sana'a
- District: Bani Matar

Population (2004)
  - Total: 11,838
- Time zone: UTC+3

Bani Qais (Arabic: بني قيس) is a sub-district located in Bani Matar District, Sana'a Governorate, Yemen. Bani Qais had a population of 11,838 according to the 2004 census.
