= Bani Mansour (Ibb) =

Bani Mansour بني منصور
- Rural Sub-District
- Location within Yemen
- Coordinates: 14.596460°N 43.594325°E
- Country: Yemen
- Governorate: Ibb Governorate
- District: Ba'dan District

Population (2014)
  - Total: 11,959
- Time zone: UTC+3 (AST)
  - Summer (DST): AST
- Geocode: 8735416

Bani Mansour (Arabic: بني منصور) is a rural sub-district in Ba'dan District, Ibb Governorate, Yemen.

According to the 2004 Yemeni Census, the population of the sub-district was 8,899 residents.

As of 2014, the population of Beni Mansour reached 11,959.
