= Al Madan district =

Al Madan District مديرية المدان
- District
- Location in Yemen
- Coordinates: 16°10′N 43°45′E
- Country: Yemen
- Governorate: 'Amran

Population (2003)
  - Total: 26,955
- Time zone: UTC+3 (Yemen Standard Time)

Al Madan District (Arabic: مديرية المدان) is a district of the 'Amran Governorate, Yemen. As of 2003, the district had a population of 26,955 inhabitants.
