= Al-Bawn =

Qā‘ al-Bawn
- Location within Yemen Location within Middle East Location within Asia
- Floor elevation: 2,205 m (7,234 ft)
- Length: 30 km (19 mi) SW-NE
- Width: 15 km (9.3 mi)

Geography
- Coordinates: 15.73056°N 43.99722°E
- Interactive map of Qā‘ al-Bawn

The al-Bawn plain, or Qā‘ al-Bawn, is a plain located in north-central Yemen, in 'Amran Governorate. It is located just to the north of the Sanaa plain, with the two being separated by a rocky area formed by volcanic activity, and the high point between them being Jabal Din. Al-Bawn stretches from southwest to northeast, with the southwestern part being higher (al-Bawn al-A‘la) and the northeastern part being lower (al-Bawn al-Asfal). The main part of al-Bawn is mostly flat and under extensive cultivation. It is relatively dry, receiving on average 300–400 mm of rainfall annually. The plain is drained toward the northeast, passing through a narrow volcanic gorge toward Wadi al-Kharid and ultimately al-Jawf. The main settlements in al-Bawn are Raydah in the central part and 'Amran in the south.

The Qa‘ al-Bawn is traditionally divided into two parts: the greater Bawn, or al-Bawn al-Kabir, forms most of it, while the lesser Bawn, or al-Bawn al-Saghir, is the smaller area at the southern end of the plain, west of 'Amran. To the northwest, the plain around Hamidah (Qa‘ Hamidah) is also sometimes counted as part of the Qa‘ al-Bawn, under the name al-Bawn al-Dakhili. The southwestern part of the Qa‘ al-Bawn rises gradually towards the foot of Masani‘, a plateau with steep sides. On the north, the plain borders the al-Zahir plateau, and to the west is the plateau of Jabal Iyal Yazid, which is part of the same formation as al-Zahir. To the east is the upland tribal area of Arhab.
