= Qaflat Othor district =

Coordinates: 16°20′N 43°40′E

Qaflat Othor District مديرية قفلة عذر
- District
- Interactive map of Qaflat Othor District
- Country: Yemen
- Governorate: 'Amran

Population (2003)
  - Total: 36,722
- Time zone: UTC+3 (Yemen Standard Time)

Al Qaflah District (Arabic: مديرية قفلة عذر) is a district of the 'Amran Governorate, Yemen. As of 2003, the district had a population of 36,722 inhabitants.
