= Suwayr district =

Coordinates: 16°00′N 43°40′E

Suwayr District مديرية صوير
- District
- Interactive map of Suwayr District
- Country: Yemen
- Governorate: 'Amran

Population (2003)
  - Total: 20,854
- Time zone: UTC+3 (Yemen Standard Time)

Suwayr District (Arabic: مديرية صوير) is a district of the 'Amran Governorate, Yemen. As of 2003, the district had a population of 20,854 inhabitants.
