= Dhi Bin district =

Coordinates: 16°00′N 44°10′E

Dhi Bin District مديرية ذيبين
- District
- Interactive map of Dhi Bin District
- Country: Yemen
- Governorate: 'Amran
- Seat: Dhi Bin

Population (2003)
  - Total: 30,799
- Time zone: UTC+3 (Yemen Standard Time)

Dhi Bin District (Arabic: مديرية ذيبين) is a district of the 'Amran Governorate, Yemen. As of 2003, the district had a population of 30,799 inhabitants.

== See also ==
- Dhi Bin
