= As Sudah district =

Coordinates: 15°55′N 43°50′E

As Sudah District مديرية السوده
- District
- Interactive map of As Sudah District
- Country: Yemen
- Governorate: 'Amran
- Seat: Al-Sudah

Population (2003)
  - Total: 32,169
- Time zone: UTC+3 (Yemen Standard Time)

As Sudah District (Arabic: مديرية السوده) is a district of the 'Amran Governorate, Yemen. As of 2003, the district had a population of 32,169 inhabitants.
