= Habur Zulaymah district =

Habur Zulaymah District مديرية حبور ظليمة
- District
- Location in Yemen
- Coordinates: 16°00′N 43°50′E
- Country: Yemen
- Governorate: 'Amran

Population (2003)
  - Total: 39,334
- Time zone: UTC+3 (Yemen Standard Time)

Habur Zulaymah District (Arabic: مديرية حبور ظليمة) is a district of the 'Amran Governorate, Yemen. As of 2003, the district had a population of 39,334 inhabitants.
