= Shaharah district =

Coordinates: 16°10′N 43°50′E

Shaharah District مديرية شهارة
- District
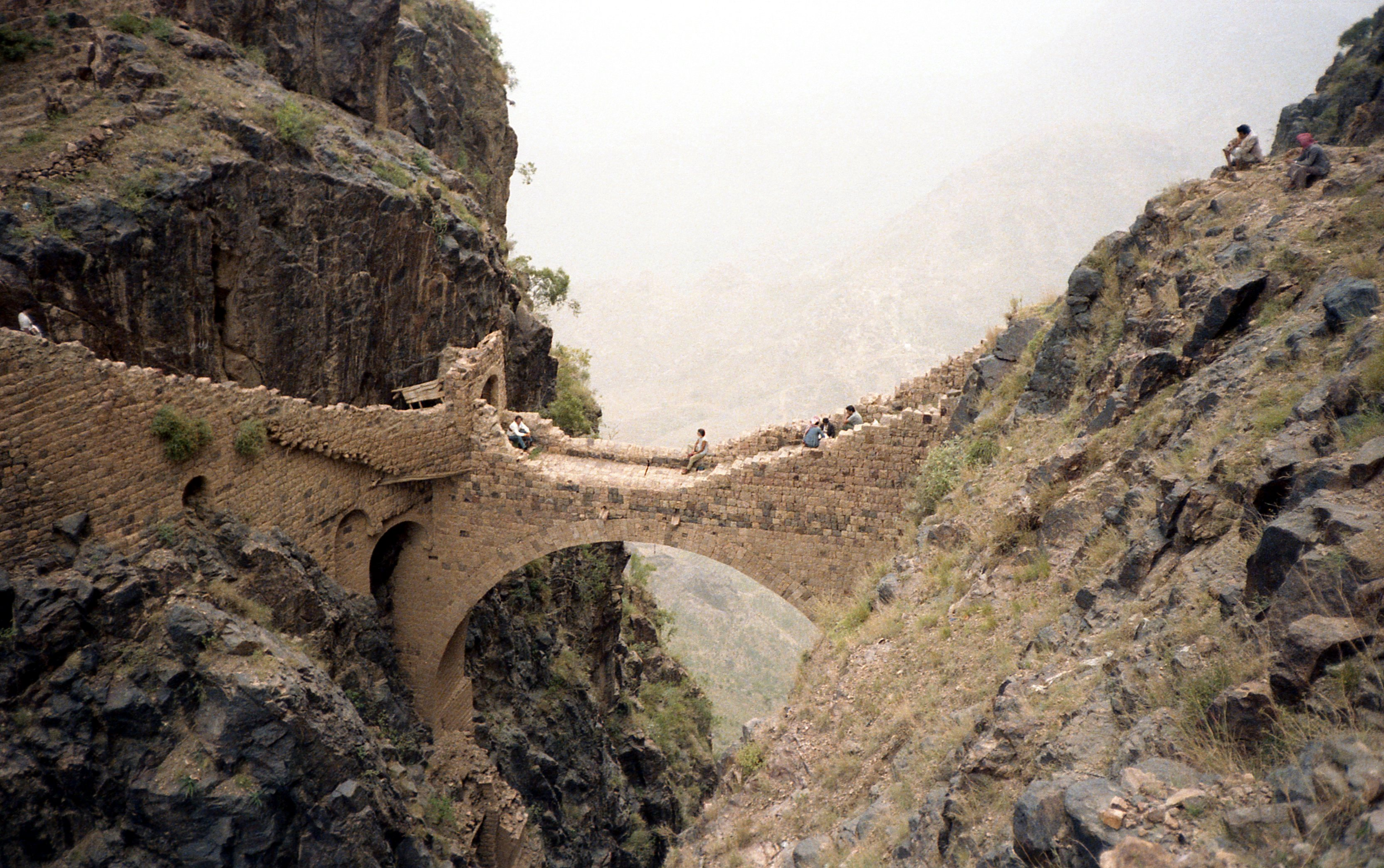
- Stone arch bridge in Shaharah

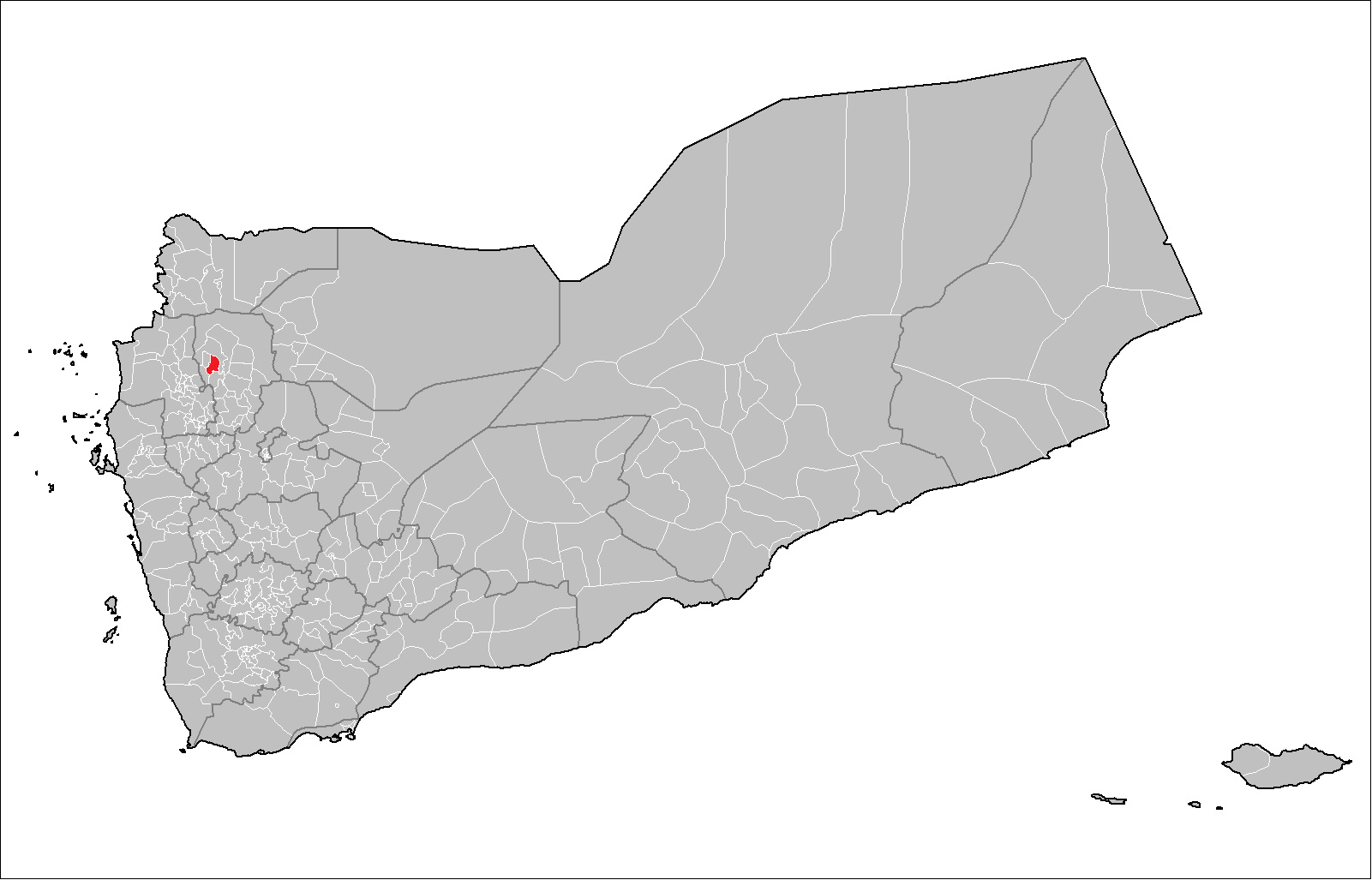
- Location of Shaharah District in Yemen
- Country: Yemen
- Governorate: 'Amran

Population (2003)
  - Total: 43,738
- Time zone: UTC+3 (Yemen Standard Time)

Shaharah District (Arabic: مديرية شهارة) is a district of the 'Amran Governorate, Yemen. As of 2003, the district had a population of 43,738 inhabitants. Its capital lies at Shaharah.
