= Raydah district =

Raydah District مديرية ريدة
- District
- Location within Yemen
- Country: Yemen
- Governorate: 'Amran

Population (2003)
  - Total: 46,631
- Time zone: UTC+3 (Yemen Standard Time)

Raydah District (Arabic: مديرية ريدة) is a district of the 'Amran Governorate, Yemen. As of 2003, the district had a population of 46,631 inhabitants.
