= Thula district =

Coordinates: 15°45′N 44°00′E

Thula District مديرية ثلاء
- District
- Interactive map of Thula District
- Country: Yemen
- Governorate: 'Amran

Population (2003)
  - Total: 40,971
- Time zone: UTC+3 (Yemen Standard Time)

Thula District (Arabic: مديرية ثلاء) is a district of the 'Amran Governorate, Yemen. As of 2003, the district had a population of 40,971 inhabitants.
