= Bani Suraim district =

Bani Suraim District مديرية بني صريم
- District
- Location in Yemen
- Country: Yemen
- Governorate: 'Amran

Population (2003)
  - Total: 32,698
- Time zone: UTC+3 (Yemen Standard Time)

Bani Suraim District (Arabic: مديرية بني صريم) is a district of the 'Amran Governorate, Yemen. As of 2003, the district had a population of 32,698 inhabitants.
