= Jabal Iyal Yazid district =

Coordinates: 15.7717°N 43.9050°E

Jabal Iyal Yazid District مديرية جبل عيال يزيد
- District
- Interactive map of Jabal Iyal Yazid District
- Country: Yemen
- Governorate: 'Amran

Population (2003)
  - Total: 84,393
- Time zone: UTC+3 (Yemen Standard Time)

Jabal Iyal Yazid District (Arabic: مديرية جبل عيال يزيد) is a district of the 'Amran Governorate, Yemen. As of 2003, the district had a population of 84,393 inhabitants.
