= Khamir district =

Coordinates: 16°00′N 44°00′E

Khamir District مديرية خمر
- District
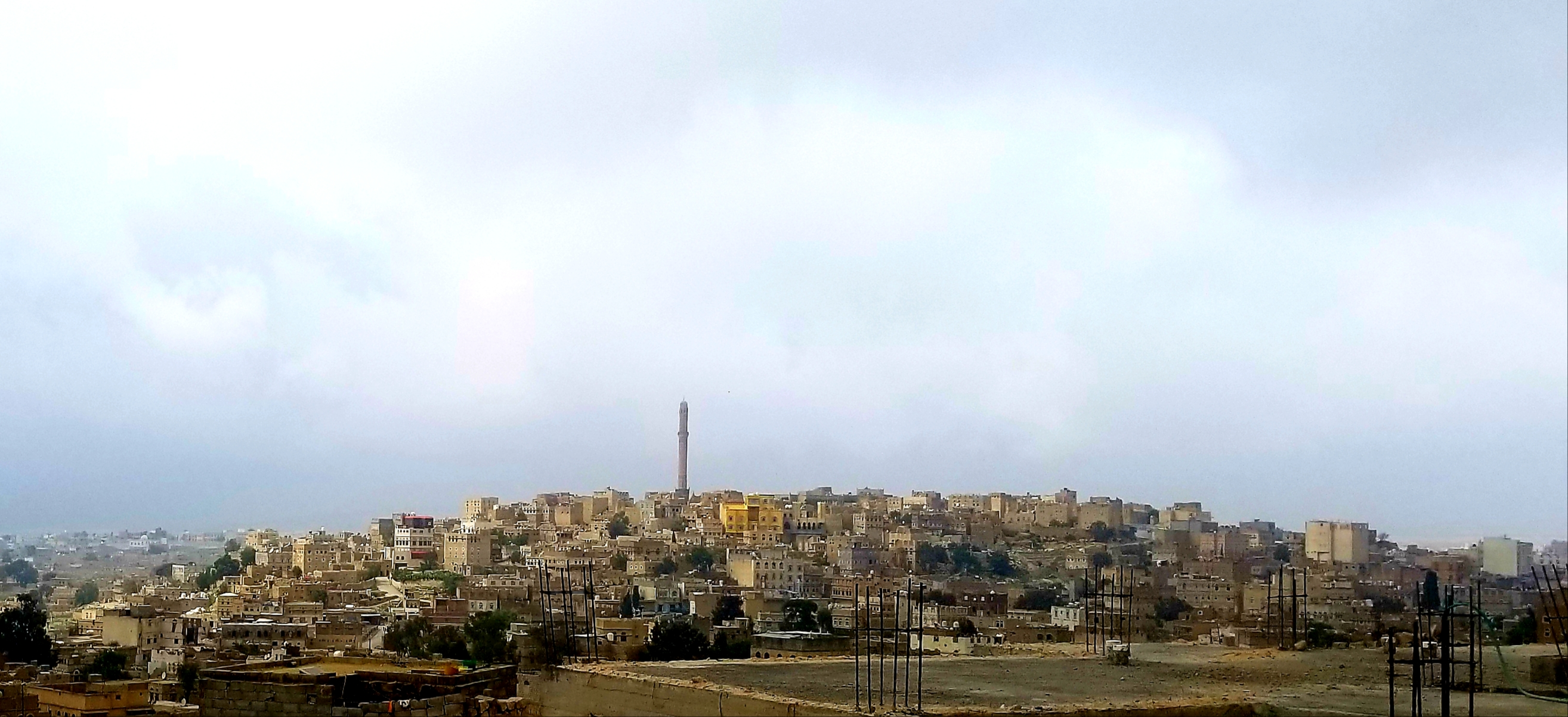
- Interactive map of Khamir District
- Country: Yemen
- Governorate: 'Amran

Population (2003)
  - Total: 73,225
- Time zone: UTC+3 (Yemen Standard Time)

Khamir (Arabic: مديرية خمر) is a district of the 'Amran Governorate, Yemen. As of 2003, the district had a population of 73,225 inhabitants.

The center of the district is Khamir. The district includes As Sunnatayn.
