= Iyal Surayh district =

Coordinates: 15°45′N 44°05′E

Iyal Surayh District مديرية عيال سريح
- District
- Interactive map of Iyal Surayh District
- Country: Yemen
- Governorate: 'Amran

Population (2003)
  - Total: 54,015
- Time zone: UTC+3 (Yemen Standard Time)

Iyal Surayh District (Arabic: مديرية عيال سريح) is a district of the 'Amran Governorate, Yemen. As of 2003, the district had a population of 54,015 inhabitants.
