= Harf Sufyan district =

Harf Sufyan District مديرية حرف سفيان
- District
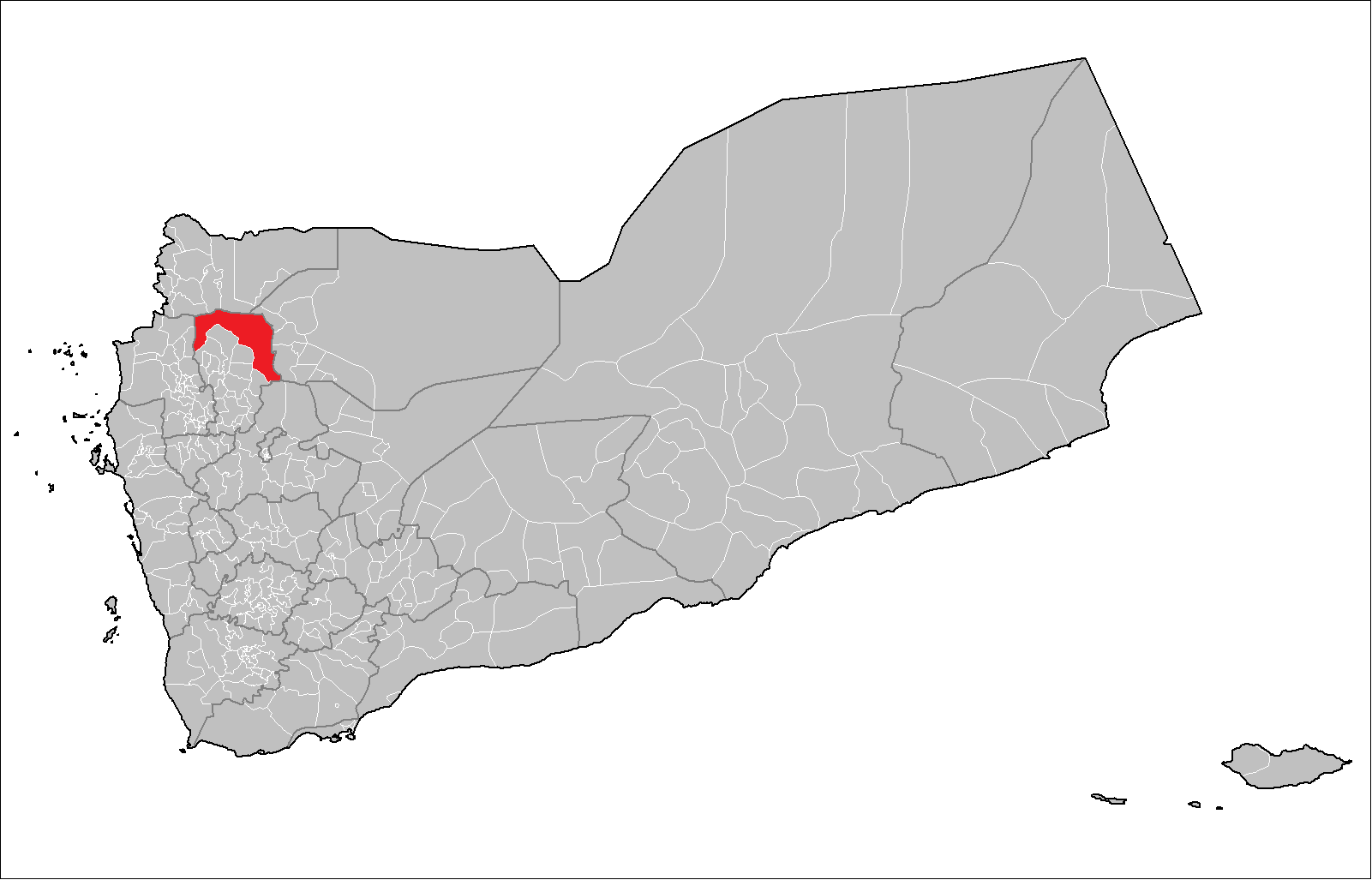
- Coordinates: 16°35′N 44°00′E
- Country: Yemen
- Governorate: 'Amran

Population (2003)
  - Total: 42,480
- Time zone: UTC+3 (Yemen Standard Time)

Harf Sufyan District (Arabic: مديرية حرف سفيان) is a district of the 'Amran Governorate, Yemen. As of 2003, the district had a population of 42,480 inhabitants.
