= Al Ashah district =

Al Ashah district مديرية العشة
- District
- Location in Yemen
- Coordinates: 16°19′26″N 43°47′15″E
- Country: Yemen
- Governorate: 'Amran

Population (2003)
  - Total: 43,859
- Time zone: UTC+3 (Yemen Standard Time)

Al Ashah district (Arabic: مديرية العشة) is a district of the 'Amran Governorate, Yemen. As of 2003, the district had a population of 43,859 inhabitants.
