= Kharif district =

Coordinates: 15°55′N 44°10′E

Kharif District مديرية خارف
- District
- Interactive map of Kharif District
- Country: Yemen
- Governorate: 'Amran

Population (2003)
  - Total: 45,977
- Time zone: UTC+3 (Yemen Standard Time)

Kharif District (Arabic: مديرية خارف) is a district of the 'Amran Governorate, Yemen. As of 2003, the district had a population of 45,977 inhabitants. On July 13, 2020, it is reported that the Houthi militia captured the last Jews of Yemen in the Kharif District.
