= As Sawd district =

Coordinates: 15.8133°N 43.7769°E

As Sawd District مديرية السود
- District
- Interactive map of As Sawd District
- Country: Yemen
- Governorate: 'Amran

Population (2003)
  - Total: 25,892
- Time zone: UTC+3 (Yemen Standard Time)

As Sawd District (Arabic: مديرية السود) is a district of the 'Amran Governorate, Yemen. As of 2003, the district had a population of 25,892 inhabitants.
