= Maswar district =

Coordinates: 15°45′N 43°45′E

Maswar District مديرية مسور
- District
- Interactive map of Maswar District
- Country: Yemen
- Governorate: 'Amran
- Seat: Bayt ʽIdhaqah

Population (2003)
  - Total: 38,432
- Time zone: UTC+3 (Yemen Standard Time)

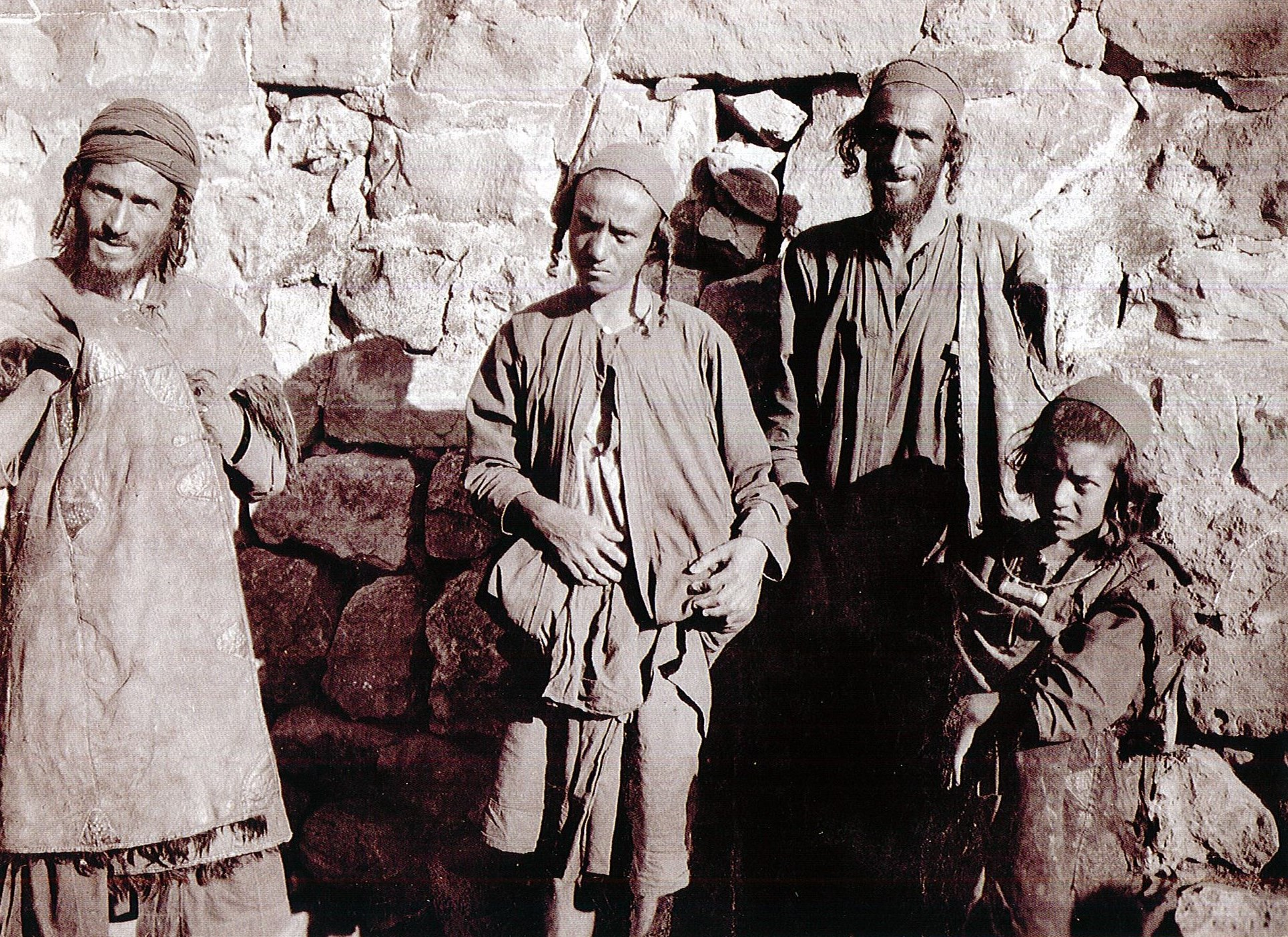
Jews from the village of Manswar in 1902

Maswar District (Arabic: مديرية مسور) is a district of the 'Amran Governorate, Yemen. As of 2003, the district had a population of 38,432 inhabitants. In the early 20th century, the mountain village was visited by German explorer and photographer, Hermann Burchardt.
