= Huth district =

Coordinates: 16°10′N 44°00′E

Huth District مديرية حوث
- District
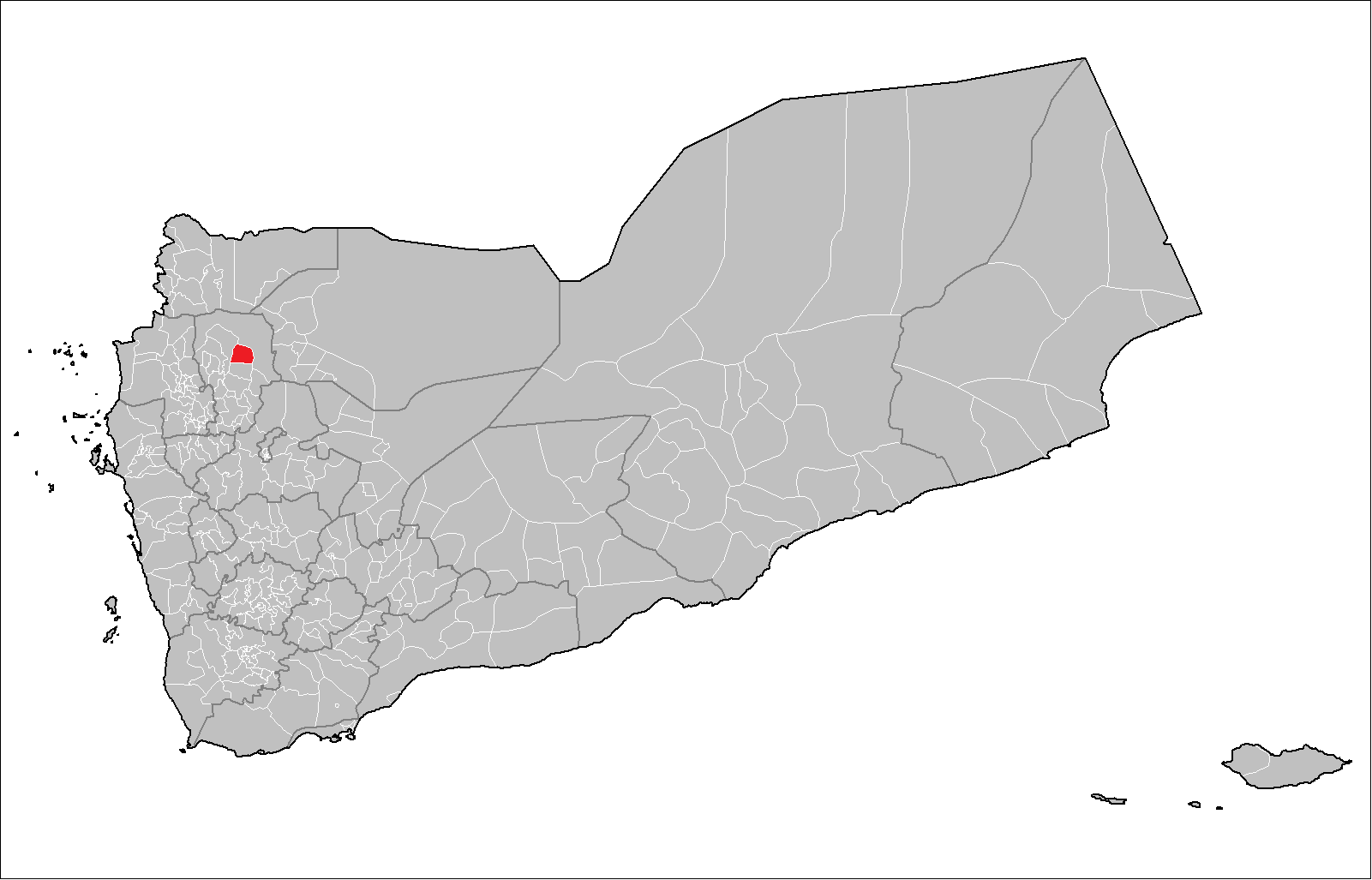
- Country: Yemen
- Governorate: 'Amran
- Seat: Huth

Population (2003)
  - Total: 22,267
- Time zone: UTC+3 (Yemen Standard Time)

Huth District (Arabic: مديرية حوث, romanized: mudīriyyat Ḥūth) is a district of the 'Amran Governorate, Yemen. As of 2003, the district had a population of 22,267 inhabitants.
