= 'Amran Governorate =

Governorate of Yemen

ʽAmran محافظة عمران
- Governorate
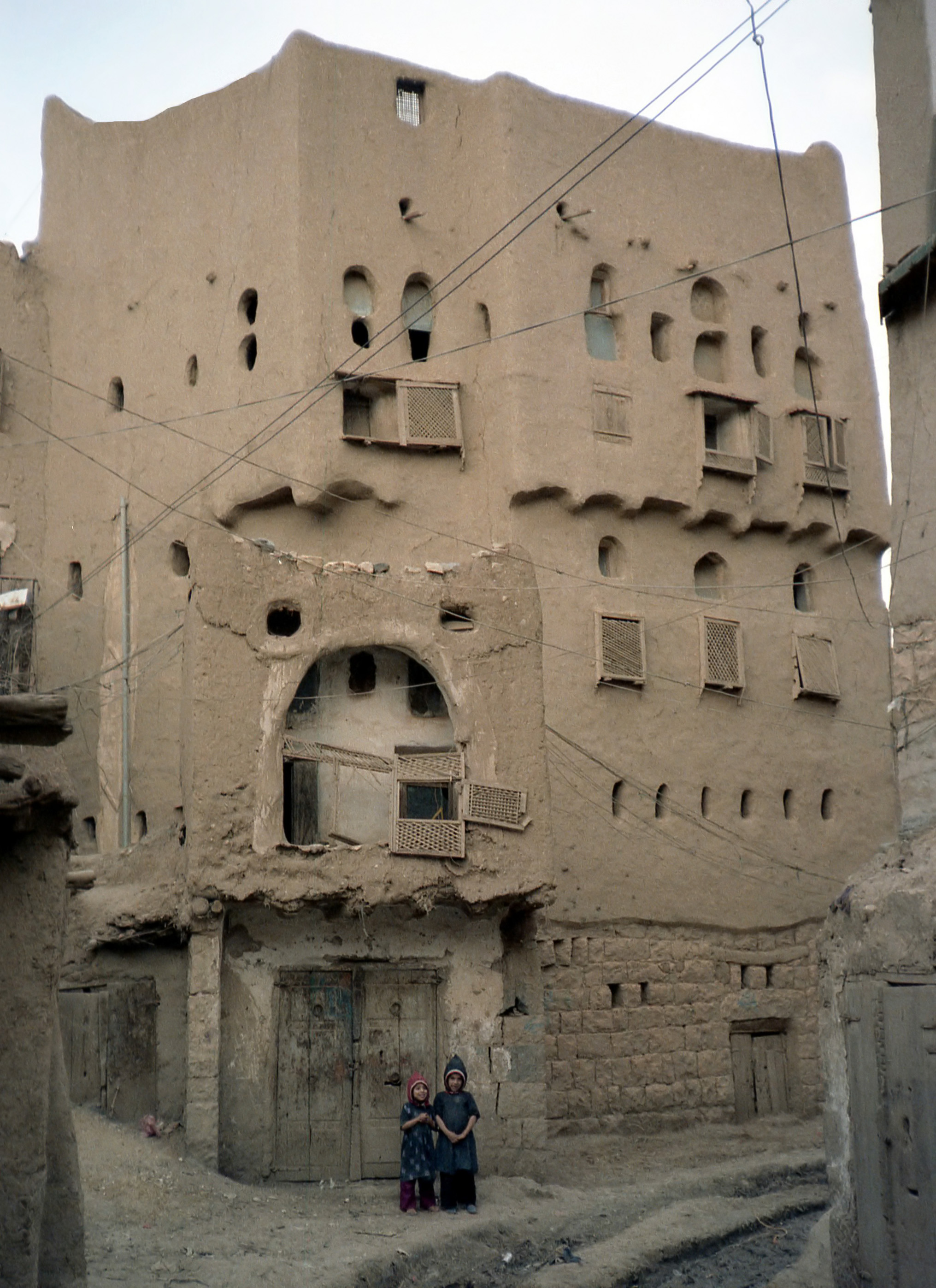

- Coordinates: 15.646°N 43.929°E
- Country: Yemen
- Region: Azal Region
- Seat: 'Amran

Area
  - Total: 7,971 km^{2} (3,078 sq mi)

Population (2025 est.)
  - Total: 1,252,713
  - Density: 157.2/km^{2} (407.0/sq mi)

ʽAmran (Arabic: عمران, romanized: ʽAmrān) is one of the governorates of Yemen. It is located approximately 50 km (31 mi) north of the national capital Sana'a. It covers an area of approximately 7,971 km^{2} (3,078 sq mi) and is subdivided into 20 districts. Its capital is 'Amran. It had an estimated population of 1,252,713 in 2025.

== History ==
Archaeological research has identified Sabaic inscriptions in the walled city of Thula dating to approximately the first century BCE. The settlement subsequently developed into an important fortified town during the Islamic period. In September 1963, 'Amran hosted a conference involving republican and royalist factions during the North Yemen civil war that attempted to establish a transitional political arrangement. During the Yemeni Civil War, Houthi forces captured the territory in July 2014 following fighting with government forces.

== Geography ==
Amran is one of the governorates of Yemen. It is situated approximately 50 km (31 mi) north of the national capital Sana'a. It is bordered by Saada Governorate to the north, Sana'a Governorate to the south and east, and Hajjah Governorate and Al Mahwit Governorate to the west. It occupies an area of approximately 7,971 km^{2} (3,078 sq mi). 'Amran is the capital of the governorate. The governorate experiences a varied climate with the mountainous areas in the west experiencing mild summers and cold winters, while the northern part of the governorate experiences a temperate climate.

== Administration and sub-divisions ==
The governorate is administered through a local council consisting of 20 members and the governor. It is divided into 20 districts. These districts are further divided into sub-districts, and then further subdivided into villages.

Districts
District	Size (km²)	Population		
District	Size (km²)	Total	Male	Female
Al Ashah	652	57,429	29,210	28,219
Al Madan	108	40,633	20,668	19,965
Al Qaflah	495	53,505	27,215	26,290
Amran	119	146,714	74,623	72,091
As Sawd	157	41,227	20,970	20,257
As Sudah	174	46,380	23,589	22,791
Bani Suraim	242	29,004	14,752	14,252
Dhi Bin	344	43,325	22,036	21,289
Habur Zulaymah	200	61,036	31,043	29,993
Harf Sufyan	2,734	58,618	29,815	28,803
Huth	370	38,729	19,700	19,029
Iyal Surayh	240	72,856	37,057	35,799
Jabal Iyal Yazid	242	120,198	61,137	59,061
Khamir	722	96,415	49,039	47,376
Kharif	265	63,888	32,496	31,392
Maswar	131	58,484	29,748	28,736
Raydah	218	65,103	33,114	31,989
Shaharah	176	66,401	33,773	32,628
Suwayr	151	36,336	18,479	17,857
Thula	173	56,432	28,702	27,730
Total	7,911	1,252,713	637,166	615,547

== Demographics ==
According to the 2004 census, Amran Governorate had a population of 877,786, comprising 451,406 males and 426,380 females. The population was estimated to be 1,061,000 in 2011. According to a 2025 estimate, its population was approximately 1,252,713, including 637,166 males and 615,547 females.

== Economy ==
Agriculture and animal husbandry are the principal economic activities in Amran. Major crops include cereals and vegetables. Agricultural production has declined in the governorate since the beginning of the civil war in 2015 because of rising fuel costs and reduced purchasing power. The governorate is also home to the Amran Cement Factory, which uses locally mined scoria and perlite in production.

In 2014, locally generated revenues accounted for 6% while approximately 94% of the governorate's general revenue came from central government grants and subsidies. The poverty rate was estimated at 76% in the same year.
