= Zamil =

Zamil is a masculine given name and surname of Arabic origin. Notable people with the name include:

== Given name ==
- Zamil Ibrahim, Malaysian politician and businessman
- Zamil Al-Sulim (born 1989), Saudi footballer

== Surname ==
- Adil Zamil Abdull Mohssin Al Zamil (born 1963), Kuwaiti Guantanamo detainee
- Ahmad Zamil (born 1978), Malaysian singer, television host, master of ceremonies, voice talent, and actor
- Muqrin ibn Zamil (died 1521), Jabrid ruler of eastern Arabia and Bahrain
