= List of heads of state of Yemen =

This article lists the heads of state of modern Yemen, from the establishment of the Kingdom of Yemen in 1918 to the present day.

Yemen is in a tumultuous state since the start of the Arab Spring-related Yemeni crisis in 2011; the crisis resulted in the resignation of President Ali Abdullah Saleh in 2012, after 33 years in power. The presidency was then transferred to Vice President Abdrabbuh Mansour Hadi. Since 2014–2015, the country has been in a civil war (alongside the Saudi-led military intervention aimed at restoring Hadi's government after the Houthi takeover) with several proto-state entities claiming to govern Yemen: the internationally recognized Cabinet of Yemen/Presidential Leadership Council, the Houthi-led Supreme Revolutionary Committee/Supreme Political Council, and the secessionist Southern Transitional Council.

== Kingdom of Yemen (1918–1970) ==
| Portrait | Imam (Birth–Death) | Reign | | | House | Claim |
| Portrait | Imam (Birth–Death) | Reign start | Reign end | Duration | House | Claim |
|---|---|---|---|---|---|---|
| | Yahya Muhammad Hamid ed-Din (1869–1948) | 30 October 1918 | 17 February 1948 (assassinated) | 29 years, 110 days | Rassid | Son of Muhammad Al-Mansur Imam of the Zaydis since 4 June 1904 |
| | Ahmad bin Yahya (1891–1962) | 17 February 1948 | 19 September 1962 | 14 years, 214 days | Rassid | Son of Yahya |
| | Muhammad al-Badr (1926–1996) | 19 September 1962 | 26 September 1962 (deposed) | 7 days | Rassid | Son of Ahmad |

=== Kingdom of Yemen in Exile (1962–1970) ===
| Portrait | Imam (Birth–Death) | Reign | | | House | Claim |
| Portrait | Imam (Birth–Death) | Reign start | Reign end | Duration | House | Claim |
|---|---|---|---|---|---|---|
| | Muhammad al-Badr (1926–1996) (Note: In northern Yemen, from March 1969 in exile in Taif, Saudi Arabia.) | 27 September 1962 | 1 December 1970 | 8 years, 65 days | Rassid | Son of Ahmad |

== Yemen Arab Republic (1962–1990) ==
| Portrait | Name (Birth–Death) | Term of office | | | Political party |
| Portrait | Name (Birth–Death) | Took office | Left office | Time in office | Political party |
President of the Republic
| | Abdullah al-Sallal (1917–1994) (Note: Styled as Chairman of the Revolutionary Command Council until 3 October 1962.) | 27 September 1962 | 5 November 1967 (deposed) | 5 years, 39 days | Military |
Chairman of the Republican Council
| | Abdul Rahman al-Eryani (1910–1998) | 5 November 1967 | 13 June 1974 (deposed) | 6 years, 220 days | Independent |
President of the Republic
| | Ibrahim al-Hamdi (1943–1977) (Note: Styled as Chairman of the Military Command Council until 13 June 1975.) | 13 June 1974 | 11 October 1977 (assassinated) | 3 years, 120 days | Military |
| | Ahmad al-Ghashmi (1935–1978) (Note: Styled as Chairman of the Military Command Council until 22 April 1978.) | 11 October 1977 | 24 June 1978 (assassinated) | 256 days | Military |
Chairman of the Presidential Council
| | Abdul Karim Abdullah al-Arashi (1929–2006) | 24 June 1978 | 18 July 1978 | 24 days | Independent |
President of the Republic
| | Ali Abdullah Saleh (1947–2017) | 18 July 1978 | 22 May 1990 | 11 years, 308 days | Military (until 24 August 1982) |
| | Ali Abdullah Saleh (1947–2017) | 18 July 1978 | 22 May 1990 | 11 years, 308 days | General People's Congress |

== People's Democratic Republic of Yemen (1967–1990) ==
| Portrait | Name (Birth–Death) | Term of office | | | Political party |
| Portrait | Name (Birth–Death) | Took office | Left office | Time in office | Political party |
President of the Republic
| | Qahtan Muhammad al-Shaabi (1920–1981) | 30 November 1967 | 22 June 1969 (deposed) | 1 year, 204 days | National Liberation Front |
Chairman of the Presidential Council
| | Salim Rubaya Ali (1935–1978) | 23 June 1969 | 26 June 1978 (assassinated) | 9 years, 3 days | National Liberation Front |
| | Ali Nasir Muhammad (born 1939) | 26 June 1978 | 27 December 1978 | 184 days | National Liberation Front (until 21 December 1978) |
| | Ali Nasir Muhammad (born 1939) | 26 June 1978 | 27 December 1978 | 184 days | Yemeni Socialist Party |
Chairman of the Presidium of the Supreme People's Council
| | Abdul Fattah Ismail (1939–1986) | 27 December 1978 | 21 April 1980 | 1 year, 116 days | Yemeni Socialist Party |
| | Ali Nasir Muhammad (born 1939) | 26 April 1980 | 24 January 1986 (deposed) | 5 years, 273 days | Yemeni Socialist Party |
| | Haidar Abu Bakr al-Attas (born 1939) | 24 January 1986 | 22 May 1990 | 4 years, 118 days | Yemeni Socialist Party |

=== Democratic Republic of Yemen (1994) ===
| Portrait | President (Birth–Death) | Term of office | | | Political party |
| Portrait | President (Birth–Death) | Took office | Left office | Time in office | Political party |
|---|---|---|---|---|---|
| | Ali Salem al-Beidh (1939–2026) (in rebellion) | 21 May 1994 | 7 July 1994 | 47 days | Yemeni Socialist Party |

== Republic of Yemen (post-unification, 1990–present) ==
Status

Denotes Acting President

| Portrait | Name (Birth–Death) | Elected | Term of office | | | Political party |
| Portrait | Name (Birth–Death) | Elected | Took office | Left office | Time in office | Political party |
President of the Republic
| | Ali Abdullah Saleh (1947–2017) (Note: Styled as Chairman of the Presidential Council until 1 October 1994.) | 1990; 1993; 1994; 1999; 2006 | 22 May 1990 | 27 February 2012 (resigned) | 21 years, 281 days | General People's Congress |
| | Abdrabbuh Mansour Hadi (1945–2026) | — | 4 June 2011 | 23 September 2011 | 111 days | General People's Congress |
| | Abdrabbuh Mansour Hadi (1945–2026) | — | 23 November 2011 | 27 February 2012 | 96 days | General People's Congress |
| | Abdrabbuh Mansour Hadi (1945–2026) | 2012 | 27 February 2012 | 7 April 2022 (resigned) | 10 years, 39 days | General People's Congress |
Chairman of the Presidential Leadership Council
| | Rashad al-Alimi (born 1954) | — | 7 April 2022 | Incumbent | 4 years, 113 days | General People's Congress |
Houthi-controlled Yemen
President of the Supreme Revolutionary Committee
| | Mohammed al-Houthi (born 1979) (Note: Appointed by the Houthis, in rebellion during their takeover and its aftermath.) (in rebellion) | — | 6 February 2015 | 15 August 2016 | 1 year, 191 days | Houthis |
President of the Supreme Political Council
| | Saleh Ali al-Sammad (1979–2018) (in rebellion) | — | 15 August 2016 | 19 April 2018 (killed) | 1 year, 247 days | Houthis |
| | Mahdi al-Mashat (born 1986) (in rebellion) | — | 25 April 2018 | Incumbent | 8 years, 97 days | Houthis |

== See also ==
- Modern history of Yemen
- Imams of Yemen
- President of the Yemen Arab Republic
- List of leaders of South Yemen
- President of Yemen
- Vice President of Yemen
