= Revolutionary Corrective Initiative =

Reforms in the Yemen Arab Republic

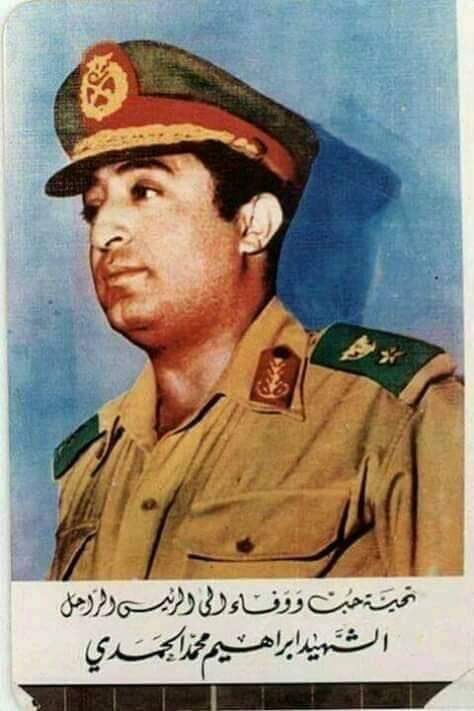
- Portrait of Ibrahim al-Hamdi
- Date: June, 1974 – 11 October, 1977 (de facto)
- Location: North Yemen
- Cause: The Underdevelopment of North Yemen; Government weakness; Poverty and wealth inequality; Fragmentation and tribalism
- Motive: Modernization of the economy, medicine and education; Centralization of power; The destruction of tribalism and conservatism; Creation a strong army; Unification with South Yemen
- Outcome: Inconclusive: Infrastructure expanded; Medicine and education improved; Ibrahim al-Hamdi killed on October 11, 1977; Hamdi was replaced by conservative Ahmad al-Ghashmi

The Revolutionary Corrective Initiative was a very ambitious reformist program in the Yemen Arab Republic, developed and launched by its 3rd president and leader of the Military Command Council (ruling military junta), Ibrahim al-Hamdi, held from 1974 to 1977. Despite high expectations, most of the program's reforms ultimately failed, including because its creator was overthrown too early.

== History ==
=== Coming to power and new policy ===
Ibrahim al-Hamdi came to power on June 13, 1974, following the successful and bloodless military overthrow of the first and last civilian leader of the YAR, Abdul Rahman al-Eryani. State radio announced the formation of a council of seven Nasserist officers to govern the country under Hamdi's leadership, which later became known as the Military Command Council (or MCC). Hamdi soon began implementing reforms, which he called the "Revolutionary Corrective initiative." The main goals of his reformist program were: effective centralization of power in the hands of the president and the military junta, elimination of tribalism and the influence of the tribal elite, elimination of corruption, reorganization of the army, modernization of the infrastructure and education of the North Yemeni population.

=== Assassination ===
Hamdi was assassinated in 1977 and replaced by the conservative Ahmad al-Ghashmi, who opposed his reforms: there is still no clear consensus on who was behind of this assassination. But these 3 years of Hamdi's rule are remembered by Yemenis as years of hope for prosperity: despite the failure of his grand strategy, al-Hamdi promoted efforts to create or reform state agencies at the center, initiated the first major retooling and reorganization of the armed forces, and promoted at the popular level an ideology of development and the idea of exchanging the benefits of state-sponsored modernization for loyalty to the state.

== Reforms ==
=== Social and economic reforms ===
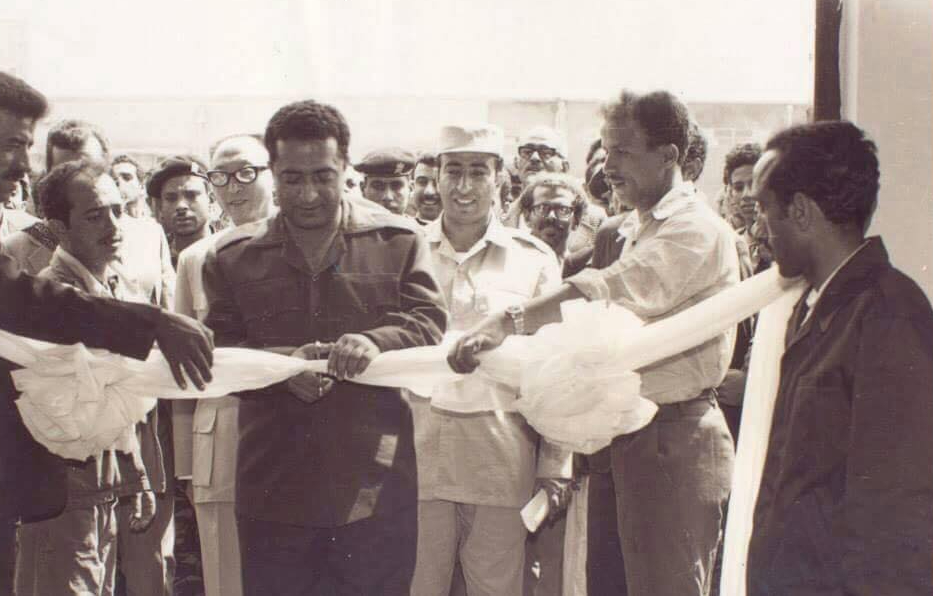
President al-Hamdi during the opening ceremony

Hamdi actively fought against conservatism in the YAR. To implement his reforms, Al-Hamdi formed a series of so-called "Corrective Committees" that were to oversee the implementation of his reforms. Hamdi viewed those committees, along with the "cooperatives", as a political, social, organizational and supervisory force supporting his state-building project. Hamdi has constantly spoken about the problems of corruption and the need to fight it. In June 1976, he launched the first five-year plan for economic and infrastructural development of North Yemen, worth $3.6 billion, which was never completed, because soon he was assassinated.

Hamdi placed great emphasis on the agricultural sector of the economy, attempting to modernize it but at the same time reducing its role in the economy. In 1974, 70 percent of the workforce was employed in agriculture. Hamdi also focused on a major modernization of the underdeveloped infrastructure: building schools, hospitals, roads, providing transportation, parks and communications, as well as constructing state facilities - administrative, organizational, legal, economic, commercial and judicial infrastructure.

In February 1977, the Kataba Agreement was signed with South Yemen, which provided (among other things) for the unification of school curricula. Hamdi allocated 31 percent of the YAR's annual budget to education.

=== Political changes ===
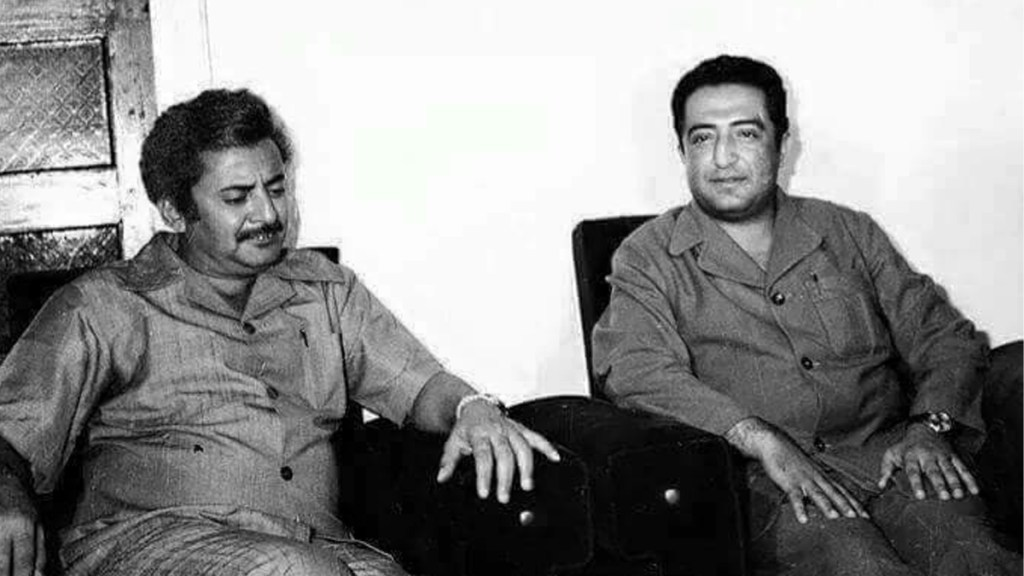
Hamdi with Salem Rubaya Ali, Chairman of the Presidium of Supreme People's Council of the South Yemen.

Inside of the YAR, Hamdi wanted to strongly centralize the North Yemeni state in the hands of the president and bypass the tribes. Another Hamdi's important goal was rapprochement and eventual unity with the People's Democratic Republic of Yemen (a.k.a. South Yemen). Relations between the YAR and the PDRY were generally cordial (compared to other divided states), although they sometimes reached wars.

Hamdi adopted a foreign policy independent of the huge middle eastern player - Saudi Arabia, stopped propaganda campaigns against the South Yemen and moved closer to it, which was another red line for Saudi Arabia. In February 1977, the Kataba Agreement was concluded between two Yemens, which provided for the formation of a Yemeni council of presidents to discuss and resolve all border issues that concern the united Yemeni people and to coordinate efforts in all areas, including economic cooperation and foreign policy.

=== Tribal Policy ===
He very quickly began a campaign to destroy the influence of tribal elites in politics and the military (which spread during the reign of his predecessor Eryani), dismissing tribal sheikhs and barring them from holding positions in government and the military again. The indirect election system in rural areas (which has used by Eryani's government) led to Parliament being dominated by tribal elites, but it was suspended by the MCC in order to reduce the tribal's power. Hamdi abolished the Ministry of Tribal Affairs, headed by Abdullah ibn Hussein al-Ahmar, considering it "an obstacle to economic and social development", transforming it into a special department called "Local Administration". President al-Hamdi believed that the tribal sheikhs were an obstacle to development, so he politically isolated them and banned any tribal sheikhs from holding government positions too. The junta under Hamdi also formed the so-called "Supreme Correctional Committee", which controlled the activities of the government apparatus and the activities of the tribal sheikhs. His anti-tribal policies greatly irritated the tribal sheikhs who were not happy with such abrupt and unfavorable changes. Hamdi criticized the sheikhs for "ruling but not taking responsibility for their actions." According to one version, it was the tribal sheikhs who organized Hamdi's assassination (including a powerful tribe confederation Hashid).

=== Modernization of the army ===
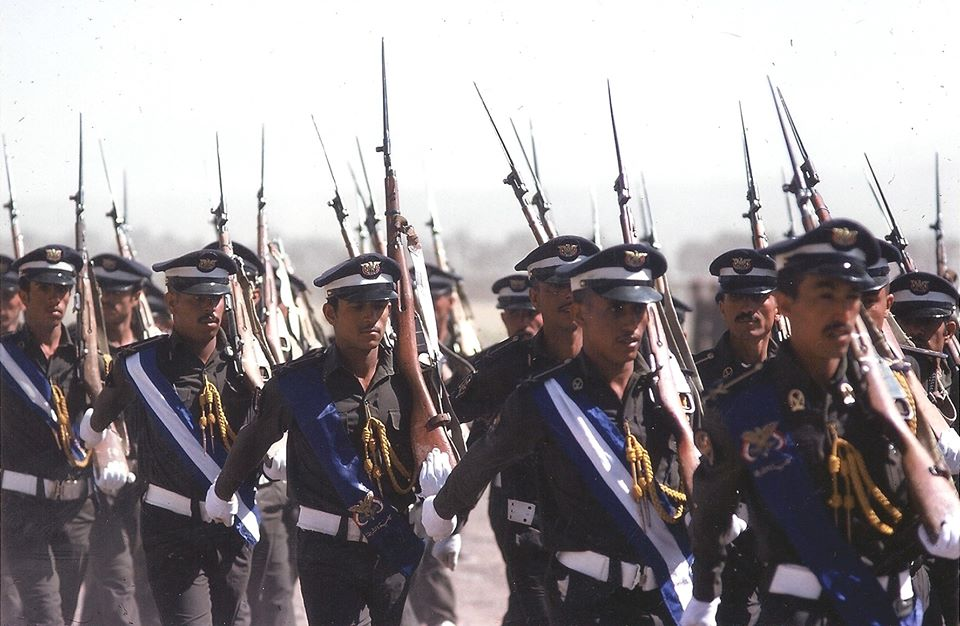
North Yemeni soldiers during the military parade in 1976.

When Hamdi came to power, the army was weakened. Controlled by the government, the military's logistics system not only depended on Sana'a's trust in the loyalty of local commanders, but was also susceptible to bribery and corruption during rule of Eryani. Tribal strife and conflict were also common in the army, and tribal affiliation in principle played a very important role in the army. Despite the presence of a central government, this government was very weak: North Yemen was in social chaos and was ruled by tribal and military power centers that emerged and strengthened at this time. All important army units were commanded by tribal sheikhs, and many tribal militias were institutionalized and integrated into the army by Eryani. Hamdi's goal was to create a strong and modern army, where soldiers' primary loyalty would be to the state, not their tribes. On July 27, 1975, a day dubbed "Army Day," Hamdi issued decrees removing several tribal sheikhs from military leadership and carried out a broad reorganization of the armed forces. He replaced many military commanders (especially those with the title of "tribal sheikh") with commanders loyal to his authority and the reformist movement he led. He led and eventually succeeded in uniting many previously disparate units into a unified Armed Forces. During Hamdi's regime, role of the army in the political system and public life expanded: the army's intervention in political life returned, and military rule became a feature of the political system. But the exact effectiveness of the YAR's Army under Hamdi is difficult to assess, since it did not fight anywhere outside of YAR during this period of history.

== Opposition to reforms ==
The very radical modernist tendencies of the reforms caused discontent both inside and outside the country - inside the country, conservative social circles and leaders who profited from it (such as tribal sheikhs) were unhappy with al-Hamdi's attempts to eradicate all conservatism, and as a result, their power based on it. Outside the YAR, the reformist policies caused discontent in countries such as Saudi Arabia, which because of them began to lose its influence in the YAR, since one of Hamdi's goals was to make the country independent from major external players. In addition, Hamdi's socialist inclinations and his desire for rapprochement with communist South Yemen also strained both Saudi Arabia and the United States against the backdrop of the Cold War. In short, Hamdi's left-wing progressivism united domestic conservatives and foreign states against him.

== See also ==
- Yemen Arab Republic
- People's Democratic Republic of Yemen
- Kataba Agreement
