= List of speakers of the House of Representatives of Yemen =

The President of the House of Representatives is the presiding officer of the Yemeni legislature. Below is a list of office-holders:

Name	Took office	Left office	Notes
Dr. Yasin Said Numan	1990	1993	
Sheikh Abdullah ibn Husayn al-Ahmar	15 June 1993	29 December 2007	
Yahya Ali al-Raee	11 February 2008	13 April 2019	
Sultan al-Barakani	13 April 2019	Incumbent	In Seiyun

== Presidents of Yemen Arab Republic legislature 1969-1990 ==
Position	Name	Took office	Left office	Notes
President of National Council	Abdullah ibn Husayn al-Ahmar	1969	1971	
President of Shura Council	Abdullah ibn Husayn al-Ahmar	1971	1975	
President of Constituent People's Assembly	Abdul Karim Abdullah al-Arashi	1978	1988	
President of Shura Council	Abdul Karim Abdullah al-Arashi	1988	1990	

== See also ==
- Supreme People's Council (South Yemen) - Legislature of South Yemen
