= Military Command Council =

Military junta in North Yemen (1974–1978)

Military Command Council مجلس القيادة العسكرية (Arabic) Majlis Al-Qiyadah Al-'skariyah
- 1974–1978
- Flag Coat of arms
- Anthem: "Peace to the Land" (1962–1978)
- Territory of the North Yemen before the unification
- Capital: Sanaa
- Religion: Islam
- Demonym: Yemeni
- Government: Islamic republic: under a Nasserist military junta
- President
  - 1974–1977: Ibrahim al-Hamdi
  - 1977–1978: Ahmad al-Ghashmi
- History
  - June 13 Corrective Movement: 13 June 1974
  - Dissolution: 22 April 1978
  - Assassination of al-Ghashmi: 24 June 1978

Area
  - Total: 136,000 km^{2} (53,000 sq mi)
- Currency: North Yemeni rial
- Today part of: Republic of Yemen

The Military Command Council or MCC (Arabic: مجلس القيادة العسكرية) was a Nasserist military junta consisted of seven military officers, that ruled the Yemen Arab Republic from 1974 until its dissolution in 1978. The Chairman occupied the leading position in the Council.

For most of the junta's existence, its leader (and president of the YAR) was Ibrahim al-Hamdi. Under his leadership, the military junta pursued a reformist and leftist policy, independent of major regional powers and aimed at modernizing the traditionally backward and fragmented North Yemen. The junta actively sought to centralize power in its own hands and eliminate other informal centers of power, such as strong tribes and especially tribal sheikhs.

== Background ==
=== Prelude to a coup ===
Nasserist officers first time gained power in 1962, when the Kingdom of Yemen suffered an army military coup, under leadership of field marshal Abdullah al-Sallal, against King Badr: the revolutionaries declared Yemen a republic. But Badr survived and able to unite tribes outside the capital Sana'a, where the coup took place. In a result, the coup triggered a bloody eight-year civil war between royalists and Republicans (so called "September Army"). At great cost to the country, the revolutionaries eventually won the war and ended the Yemeni monarchy.

The main country supporting the Yemeni Nasserists was Egypt under President Gamal Abdel Nasser: on his orders, tens of thousands of Egyptian soldiers were sent to North Yemen to help the pro-Republican side. Sallal's regime was kept in power precisely thanks to Egyptian assistance: for example, just a few days after the coup, 5,000 Egyptian soldiers were already placed in North Yemen to protect Sallal from a counter-coup. Sallal relied almost entirely on them and on volunteer pilots from Syria, rather than on his supporters in North Yemen itself.

But in 1967, the Six-Day War began, which went very badly for Egypt. Because of this war, Egypt began a hasty withdrawal of its troops from North Yemen, leaving Sallal almost defenseless against a coup. And the coup eventually happened: on November 5, 1967, while Sallal was in Baghdad, his regime was de facto overthrown by disgruntled officers.

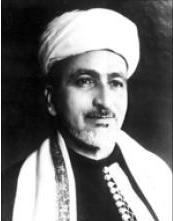
Abdul Rahman al-Eryani

=== Al-Eryani period ===
The coup was orchestrated by Judge Abdul Rahman al-Eryani, who became the next president of the YAR. Al-Eryani was the first and last civilian leader to ever lead North Yemen. Eryani was extremely negative towards both the Saudi and Egyptian interventions in the civil war. He eventually managed to establish ties with Saudi Arabia, successfully convincing them to recognize the new republic and abandon their support for the monarchists. He opposed the monarchy in general and was a member of the "Free Yemeni Movement" opposition group during the kingdom exist, but he led the reconciliation process with the monarchists after the civil war, successfully negotiating a national peace accord with them.

However, Eryani was unable to build a strong national state, even after the civil war ended. His central government was very weak: North Yemen was in social chaos and was ruled by tribal and military power centers that emerged and strengthened after the overthrow of the officer Sallal in 1967: his concessions to the tribes were too great. In 1973, the spokesman and leader of the powerful Hashid tribal confederation, Abdullah al-Ahmar, denied widespread rumours that more than 20 percent of the projected spending was allocated to sheikhs, saying the correct figure was less than 2 percent. Because of that Eryani's policy, the penetration of tribal sheikhs into all state institutions eventually reached a new, very high, level. All important army units were commanded by tribal sheikhs, and many tribal militias were institutionalized and integrated into the army under Eryani, leftist militants waged a full-scale guerrilla war against his government from 1971 to 1973, and in January 1973, there were direct reports of local uprisings against the sheikhs and the infiltration of armed agents from South Yemen. A number of sources call the overthrow of Sallal and his replacement with Eryani "a step back in the goals of the 1962 revolution."

== Seizure of power ==
On June 13, 1974, a bloodless coup d'etat took place in the Yemen Arab Republic: a group of military officers successfully overthrew al-Eryani. Yemeni state radio announced that a council of seven Yemeni army colonels had been created to govern the country (which is MCC). According to the radio, the council was headed by Colonel Ibrahim al-Hamdi, who organized the coup. Hamdi became next official North Yemeni president (officially only in 1975). Military junta had imposed a 4-day, 24-hour curfew, but lifted it two days later, on June 16. On June 22, the MCC announced a new cabinet: it consisted of Muhsin Ahmad Al-Ayni (Prime Minister andForeign Affairs), Hassan Makki (Deputy Prime Minister for Economic Affairs), Abd al-Latif Daifallah (Public Works), Muhammad al-Junayd (Finance), Abdallah al-Asnaj (Communications), Ahmad Jabir Afif (Education), All al-Saman (Justice), Ahmad Damash (Information), Abd al-Karim al-Eryani (Development Affairs of the State), Abd al-Malik al-Tayyib (Local Authorities), Yahya al-Mutawakkil (Interior Affairs), Muhammad Abd al-Wadfid (Health), Abdo Ali Usman (Municipalities), Sultan Algharshi (Supplies and Consumer Affairs), Muhammad al-Rubai (Youth, Labor, and Social Affairs), Ahmad al-Kabab (Waqf), 'Abd al-Wahhab Mahmud (Economy), Muhammad al-Wazir (Agriculture), Salah al-Masri, Amin Abfil Ras, and 'Abd al-Karim al-Jansi.

== Leadership of North Yemen ==
=== Reformist policy ===
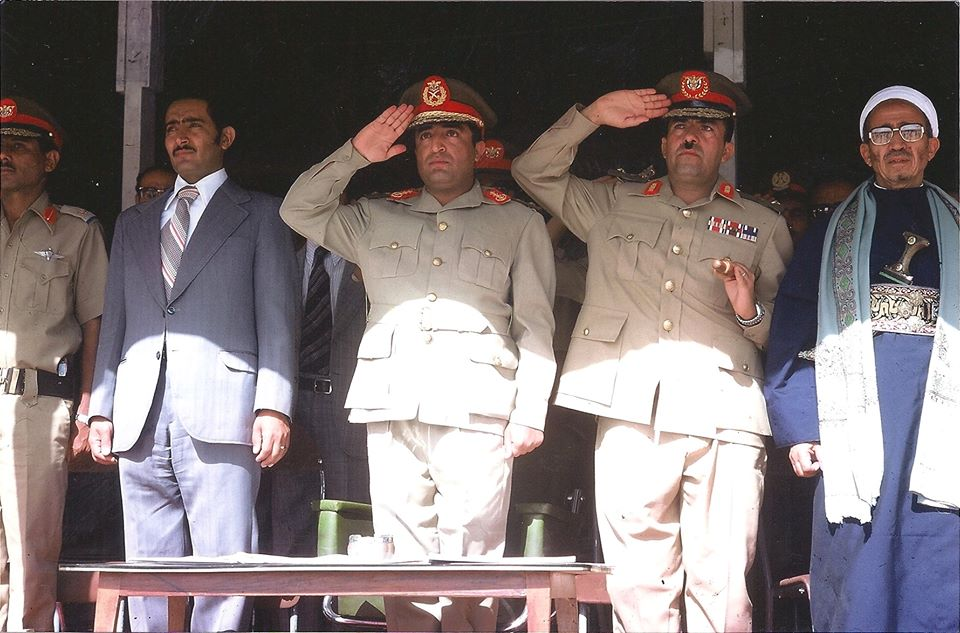
Two leaders of the MCC at different times, Hamdi (left) and Ghashmi (right) at a military parade in 1976. Both in military uniform.

Leader of a MCC, Hamdi, was Nasserist and socialist: in the result, the military junta began to implement a series of ambitious reforms, which Hamdi called "Revolutionary Corrective Initiative." Hamdi wanted to create a highly personalized regime: he was given the simple title of "brother" (Arabic: “الأخ”) and started to build his personality cult, but it didn't go far. The 1974 coup established secular, modernizing tendencies that contradicted the Islamic values of the Eryani regime. The indirect election system in rural areas (which has used by Eryani's government) led to Parliament being dominated by tribal elites, but it was suspended by the MCC in 1974, in order to try to reduce the tribal elite's power. The junta led by Hamdi has attempted to implement social reforms and modernize conservative tribal Yemen (creating a number of committees to implement them). Junta fought corruption, initiated a grand infrastructure plan, sought to educate the population (It's allocated 31% of the country's annual budget to education) and reorganized the army. Under Hamdi's rule, the junta built hospitals, hundreds of new schools and thousands of roads. Under his leadership, junta also launched a number of educational and Health projects. To implement his reforms, Al-Hamdi formed a series of so-called "Corrective Committees" that were to oversee the implementation of his reforms. Hamdi viewed those committees, as a political, social, organizational and supervisory force supporting his state-building project. He also created so-called "cooperatives", according to his leftist ideology, which have been central to the creation of roads, schools, water systems, and clinics: under his leadership, the number of cooperatives grew from twenty-eight in 1973 to more than 200 in 1980. But also under MCC and Hamdi, the role of the army in the political system and public life expanded: the army's intervention in political life returned, and military rule became a feature of the political system.

=== rapprochement with South Yemen ===
Junta also made attempts at rapprochement with South Yemen: for example, in February 1977, the "Kataba Agreement" was concluded, which provided for the formation of a Yemeni council of presidents al-Hamdi and Salem Rubaya Ali (South Yemeni president) to discuss and resolve all border issues that concern the united Yemeni people and to coordinate efforts in all areas, including foreign policy. The Saudis, along with their tribal allies in Yemen itself, have accused Hamdi of moving too quickly toward South Yemen.

=== 1977 Taiz conference ===
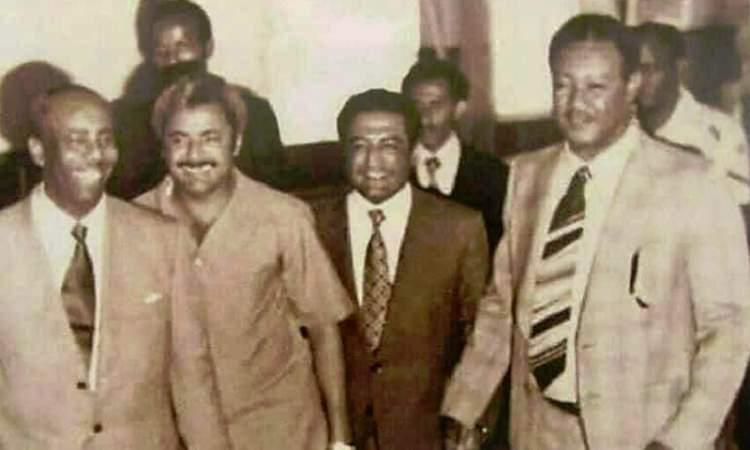
Leaders of PDRY, YAR, Somalia and Sudan meets on the conference. From left to the right: Siad Barre, Salim Rubaya Ali, Ibrahim al-Hamdi and Gaafar Nimeiry.

On March 22–23, Hamdi convened a high-level conference on Red Sea security in Taiz: in addition to himself, the leaders of the PDRY (Salim Rubaya Ali), Sudan (Gaafar Nimeiry) and Somalia (Siad Barre) attended. The conference took place 10 days after another meeting organized by Cuban leader Fidel Castro in the PDRY's capital Aden, at which the PDRY and Somalia, along with Ethiopia, rejected a proposal to create a federation of Marxist East African states. One of the most prominent outcomes of that summit was the formation of a security and development system for the Red Sea region. Although this meeting did not achieve any other practical results, it caused discontent among Saudi Arabia: they were outraged by Hamdi's quick initiative, which preceded them, although they, too, were very closely following the issue. Crown Prince Fahd, in an interview with a Kuwaiti newspaper, said that the Saudis were not warned in advance about the upcoming conference, so they did not participate.

=== Conflict inside the YAR ===
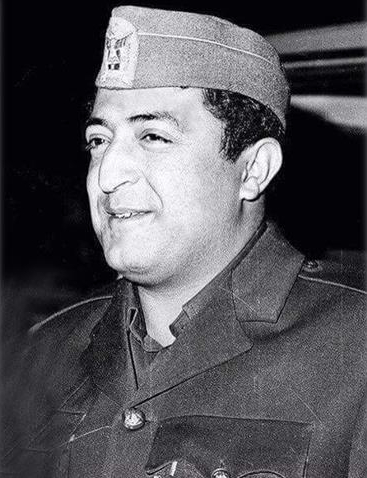
Al-Hamdi in 1976

In April 1977, the conflict within the Yemen Arab Republic escalated: on the 10th, the pro-Saudi and tribal-sympathetic prime minister, Abdullah al-Hagri, was assassinated in London. Suspicion quickly fell on the National Democratic Front, a leftist guerrilla group. It was supported by South Yemen, but the junta under Hamdi had also used it for its own purposes, for example as a counterweight to the Yemeni tribes, which raised suspicions of Hamdi's involvement. In May and June, clashes between tribal militias and government troops escalated to the level of a full-fledged guerrilla war, which was also happening against the backdrop of recent changes related to Hamdi's policy of weakening tribal authority. 40,000 fighters from the tribal militias, who had previously controlled some territories, captured the cities of Hamir and Saada. The junta ordered a counter-offensive, supported by air power, that forced the militants to retreat from the cities to their traditional strongholds in the northeast. In early September 1977, Hamdi negotiated an agreement with the tribal leaders, promising them greater representation in the ruling military junta, the replacement of Prime Minister Abd al-Ghani with someone more acceptable to them, elections for a Consultative Council, and other concessions in return for the tribes surrendering their heavy weapons and withdrawing from some of the territory they had seized in recent fighting; however, many members of the MCC did not approve of the agreement, and tensions were rising again by late September. Hamdi planned to leave for an important visit to South Yemen on 13 October. However, president Hamdi was assassinated on October 10, 1977, presumably by Saudi agent (Saudi Arabia had its own motives for that: for example Hamdi oppose to Saudi influence in North Yemen).

== Dissolution ==
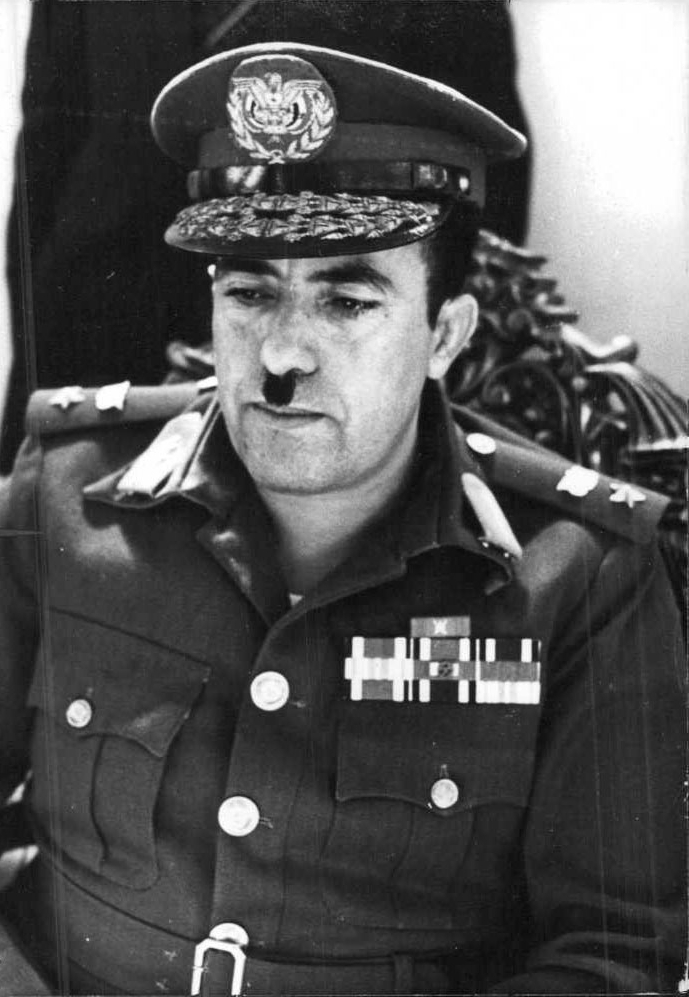
Photo of Ghashmi.

Hamdi rooted out all the military leaders who seemed capable of governing the country. He did not root out his deputy Ahmad Hussein al-Ghashmi, not seeing any danger or aspiration to the presidency in him: his personality did not show any leadership qualities. This is precisely what Ghashmi took advantage of, instantly reaching the very top of power later, albeit briefly. Ghashmi played an important role in the plot against Hamdi and his assassination. He quickly managed to take control of all army units and get rid of the military leaders who could cause him trouble. Lt. Colonel al-Ghashmi was chosen as chairman of MCC on October 11, 1977. He issued a decree on February 6, 1978, which provided for the establishment of a Constituent People's Assembly, in which the influence of tribes dominated. Al-Ghashmi was elected president by the Constituent People's Assembly on April 22, 1978, and on the same day, Assembly voted to disband MCC. Soon, in May, the government suppressed a military rebellion led by Major Ali Abd Aalim, former member of the disbanded MCC, resulting in the deaths of some 50 individuals. Colonel al-Ghashmi gradually eliminated the civilian and military forces that had supported the former president. The centralization of power achieved under Ibrahim al-Hamdi began to loosen dangerously, and several areas of the country went into open rebellion against the government authorities. Ghashmi was a conservative who wanted to roll back Hamdi's reforms and get closer to Saudi Arabia again. However, Ghashmi's rule lasted even less: he was assassinated just 8 months into his rule, in Sana’a, on June 24, 1978, and a now just three-member Presidential Council headed by Abdul Karim al-Arashi took control of the government on June 25, 1978.

The Constituent People's Assembly elected Lt. Colonel Ali Abdullah Saleh as president on July 17, 1978. On August 10, 1978, his government sentenced 30 military officers to death for their involvement in the May 1978 military rebellion. President Saleh suppressed a military rebellion on October 15, 1978, and 21 individuals were executed for their involvement in the military rebellion on October 27 and November 15, 1978. Some 150 individuals were killed in political violence between April 1970 and December 1978. Saleh rolled back Hamdi's reforms. Although everyone was sure that Saleh would not stay in power for long, to everyone's surprise, he survived and was able to consolidate his power and hold on to it for decades.

== Legacy ==
The junta, or more specifically its first president, Ibrahim al-Hamdi, left fond memories among Yemeni citizens. His efforts to reform and unite a country so diverse left a mark on many Yemenis that has lasted for decades. When Yemen's revolution against the government of Ali Abdullah Saleh began, protesters carried portraits of Hamdi and demanded an investigation into his assassination.

== Other names ==
The MCC also known sometimes as the Military Forces General Command Council, Yemeni Command Council, Leadership Council or just Command Council.

== Organization ==
=== Organization on the October, 1977 ===
==== Chairman ====
- Ibrahim al-Hamdi (June 13, 1974 - October 11, 1977)

==== Deputy Chairman ====
- Ahmad al-Ghashmi (June 13, 1974 - October 11, 1977)

==== Assistant to the Chairman ====
- Abdul Karim Abdullah al-Arashi (June 13, 1974 - October 11, 1977)

==== Other members ====
- Ali Abdullah Saleh
- Mujahid Abu Shawarb
- Abdullah Mohammed Al-Hamdi
- Ali Abd Aalim

== See also ==
- Revolutionary Corrective Initiative
- Yemen Arab Republic

== Bibliography ==
- Nohlen, Dieter (2001). Elections in Asia and the Pacific: A Data Handbook, Volume I: Middle East, Central Asia, and South Asia. Oxford University Press. ISBN 978-0199249589.
- Al-Taweel, Nasser (2009). الحركة الاسلامية والنظام السياسي في اليمن [The Islamic Movement and the Political System in Yemen] (in Arabic). Khalid Ibn Al-Walid Public Library.
