= Yahya Ali al-Raee =

Yemeni politician (born 1953)

Yahya Ali Ahmed al-Raee

President of the House of Representatives of Yemen
- In office 11 February 2008 – 13 April 2019
- Preceded by: Abdullah ibn Husayn al-Ahmar
- Succeeded by: Sultan al-Barakani

Personal details
- Born: January 1, 1953 (age 73) Dhamar Governorate
- Party: General People's Congress
- Education: Master of Military Sciences

Yahya Ali Ahmed al-Raee (Arabic: يحيى علي أحمد الراعي; born 1 January 1953) is a Yemeni politician and was speaker of the Yemeni House of Representatives from 2008 to 2019.

He is a member of the General People's Congress, and was elected in February 2008 to succeed Abdullah ibn Husayn al-Ahmar who died in office.

Following the Yemeni civil war since 2015, only semi-regular sessions of the legislature were held in San'aa.
