= June 13 Corrective Movement =

1974 coup in the Yemen Arab Republic

1974 Yemeni coup d'etat
- Part of the Arab Cold War
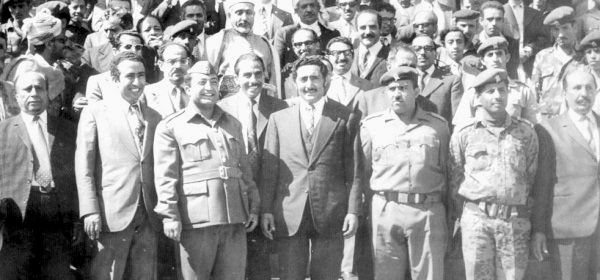
- Military officers after the coup.
Date	June 13, 1974
Location	North Yemen
Result	Coup victory: The military overthrew Abdul Rahman al-Eryani; Creation of the Military Command Council; Ibrahim al-Hamdi becomes the new president; The beginning of an ambitious reformist program

Belligerents
Government	Army dissidents

Commanders and leaders
Abdul Rahman al-Eryani	Ibrahim al-Hamdi; Ahmad al-Ghashmi; Mujahid Abu Shawarib; Yahya al-Mutawakkil; Abdullah al-Hamdi; Ali Abu Lahoum; Mohammed Abu Lahoum

Casualties and losses
- No casualties

The June 13 Corrective Movement (Arabic: حركة 13 يونيو التصحيحية), also known as just the June 13th Movement or 1974 Yemeni coup, was a bloodless military coup in the Yemen Arab Republic. The coup marked the end of civilian rule and brought to power a newly created military junta led by the officer Ibrahim al-Hamdi. The new regime began an unprecedented series of social, political, economic and military reforms. However, a series of unwise moves in the reformist program led to the assassination of Hamdi and his successor, Ahmad al-Ghashmi, by external forces that were not in favor of their policies.

== Background ==
On 26 September 1962, Nasserist officers led by Abdullah al-Sallal, with Egyptian support, staged a coup against the Yemeni monarchy and King Muhammad al-Badr. Badr survived and was able to organize his supporters outside the capital, leading them to fight against the instigators of the coup. This led to an 8-year civil war that ended with the victory of the Nasserists in 1970 and the establishment of the Yemen Arab Republic.

Egypt sent troops to North Yemen from the very beginning of the war to support the revolutionary regime: Sallal relied on them more than on his supporters in Yemen itself. When Egyptian troops withdrew from North Yemen, Sallal's regime collapsed and was overthrown in a coup on 5 November 1967, led by Yemeni sheikhs and military officers. He was replaced by Abdul Rahman al-Eryani, who turned out to be North Yemen's only civilian leader.

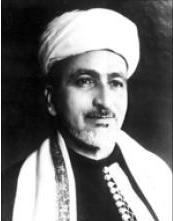
Abdul Rahman al-Eryani.

Despite moves towards reconciliation with external forces, such as the monarchists remaining from the civil war or Saudi Arabia, which supported them, internally the YAR under Eryani's leadership was a very weak and fragmented country, characterized by remained conservatism and tribalism. The presidency has lost its prestige due to the division of the army, its multiple loyalties, the absence of the rule of law and the emergence of multiple parties controlling the political scene. Despite the presence of a central government, this government was very weak: North Yemen was in social chaos and was ruled by tribal and military power centers that emerged and strengthened after the overthrow of the officer Sallal in 1967: for example, parliament being dominated by tribal elites. During those times, the penetration of tribal sheikhs into all state institutions reached a new level. All important army units were commanded by tribal sheikhs, and many tribal militias were institutionalized and integrated into the army under Eryani, and leftist militants waged a full-scale guerrilla war against his government from 1971 to 1973. In January 1973, there were direct reports of local uprisings against the sheikhs and the infiltration of armed agents from South Yemen.

The conflict within Yemeni state leadership reached its peak between late 1973 and early 1974, primarily involving two key figures: Judge Abdul Rahman al-Eryani, President of the Republican Council, and Sheikh Abdullah ibn Husayn al-Ahmar, President of the Shura Council, each backed by their own distinct bases of support. In an attempt to make a collective effort to bring unity to the ranks, a semi-secret committee was formed in early 1973. It consisted of 15 members. Although the committee was formed "with the aim of reconciliation between Al-Eryani and Al-Ahmar," it oversaw the transfer of power from Eryani to Hamdi later. In the two weeks before the coup, government media reported explosions and armed clashes between rival political factions and tribes across the country, including in the capital Sana'a.

== The coup ==
On June 13, 1974, state media reported that the President of the Republican Council, Judge Abdul Rahman Al-Eryani, under pressure and threats from the powerful Hashid tribal confederation of invasion to Sana'a, submitted his resignation by envoy to Sheikh Abdullah ibn Husayn Al-Ahmar, the President of the Shura Council and the sheikh of Hashid; Eryani's house was previously surrounded by military forces of an Abdullah al-Hamdi, brother of Ibrahim. Al-Ahmar informed envoy that his massed tribes intended to occupy capital by force. Nevertheless, Deputy Commander in Chief Hamdi has taken position that he will defend capital at any cost: he has deployed tanks, artillery and regular infantry units on roads leading into capital from north, as well as around radio station and principal public buildings in Sana'a. All airports have been closed. Al-Ahmar then submitted his resignation along with his own to Deputy Commander-in-Chief Lieutenant Colonel Ibrahim Al-Hamdi due to the absence of Commander-in-Chief Lieutenant Colonel Mohammed Al-Eryani and Chief of Staff Hussein Al-Masoori, who were both outside the country. President Eryani, meanwhile, has left the capital for Taiz to remove himself as focal point for opposition of tribes and pretext for their threatened seizure of capital. The military, who had previously protected the capital from possible attacks by tribal militias, took power into their own hands.

The military leadership met and accepted the resignation, and announced the abolition of the Republican Council, the dissolution of the Shura Council, the abolition of the General Command of the Armed Forces, the dissolution of the "Yemeni Union", the only political organization in the country, and the freezing of the constitution. Government radio announced that the armed forces had formed a council of seven officers to govern the country that same day (which later became known as the Military Command Council). The leader of the MCC, officer Al-Hamdi, said in his speech: "I can happily say that not a single drop of blood was shed, no one was imprisoned, and the country's security was not subject to any shocks."

The army leaders loyal to Sheikhs Ahmar and Sinan Abu Lahum were prepared to form a military leadership council to take over the reins of power, headed by al-Hamdi, whom the alliance had carefully selected for his supposedly weak personality. However, Hamdi began a determined campaign to destroy the influence of the tribal sheikhs. He made decisions that led to the overthrow of many leaders representing the traditional centres of power in the army and security apparatus, removed many tribal sheikhs from positions of power in the state, and abolished the interests of tribal sheikhs in order to reduce the influence of traditional centres of power and eliminate the consequences of the chaos and unrest of previous years. In addition to his position as leader of the MCC and President of the Yemen Arab Republic, Hamdi also received the position of Commander-in-Chief of the Armed Forces. He enjoyed the trust of the Yemeni Nasserists and Ba'athists, and all conflicting parties in Yemen united around Hamdi.

== Aftermath ==
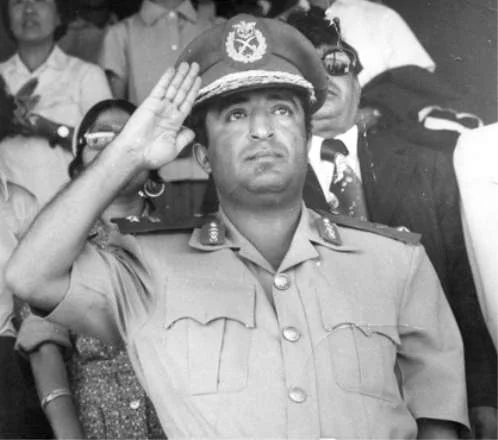
Ibrahim al-Hamdi during the military parade.

Under Ibrahim al-Hamdi's leadership, a series of structural reforms were launched with the goal of reducing the power of tribal elites and building a centralized Yemeni state. He called his reformist program the "Revolutionary Corrective Initiative."

As part of his program, he began efforts to expand the YAR's infrastructure and education, modernize and re-equip the army, build positive relations with South Yemen to achieve unity, and create a strong central government in the YAR. He actively tried to eliminate the influence of all forces outside the government on YAR politics: he clashed with Saudi Arabia over his foreign policy, and at home he fought against the influence of such forces as strong tribes or pro-Iraqi Ba'athists.

However, in 1977 he was assassinated: there is still no clear determination of who was behind his death, but according to some assumptions, it was either an agent of the Saudi intelligence (who did not like the independent policies of his government) or the leader of the Hashid tribal confederation, Abdullah al-Ahmar (who did not like his anti-tribal policies). He was replaced by a conservative officer, Colonel Ahmad al-Ghashmi, who pursued pro-Saudi and pro-tribal policies in opposition to Hamdi's reforms. Ghashmi likewise met a violent end, being assassinated in 1978.

== See also ==
- Corrective Move – 1969 Marxist internal coup in South Yemen
- Corrective revolution (Egypt) – Reform introduced by Anwar Sadat in Egypt
- Corrective Revolution (Syria) – 1970 coup led by Hafez al-Assad
- Ramadan Revolution – 1963 Ba'athist military coup in Iraq
