= Sultan al-Barakani =

Yemeni politician (born 1956)

- سلطان البركاني
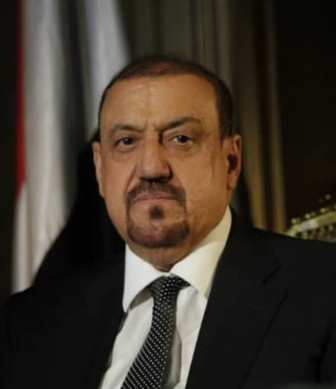

Speaker of the Yemeni House of Representatives
- Incumbent
- Assumed office 13 April 2019
- Preceded by: Yahya Ali al-Raee

Personal details
- Born: July 27, 1956 (age 70) Al-Maafer District, Taiz Governorate
- Party: General People's Congress (Yemen)

Sultan Saeed Abdullah al-Barakani (Arabic: سلطان سعيد عبدالله البركاني; born 1956) is a Yemeni politician and the current speaker of the Yemeni House of Representatives since 2019.

Al-Barakani was born in 1956 in Al-Maafer District, Taiz Governorate. He is a GPC MP, and was elected as new speaker of the House of Representatives during a session held in Seiyun on 13 April 2019. This was the first session for the parliament loyal to the internationally recognized government of Yemen since the Yemen civil war started in 2015.
