= Ahmad al-Ghashmi =

President of North Yemen from 1977 to 1978

Ahmad bin Hussein al-Ghashmi
- أحمد حسين الغشمي
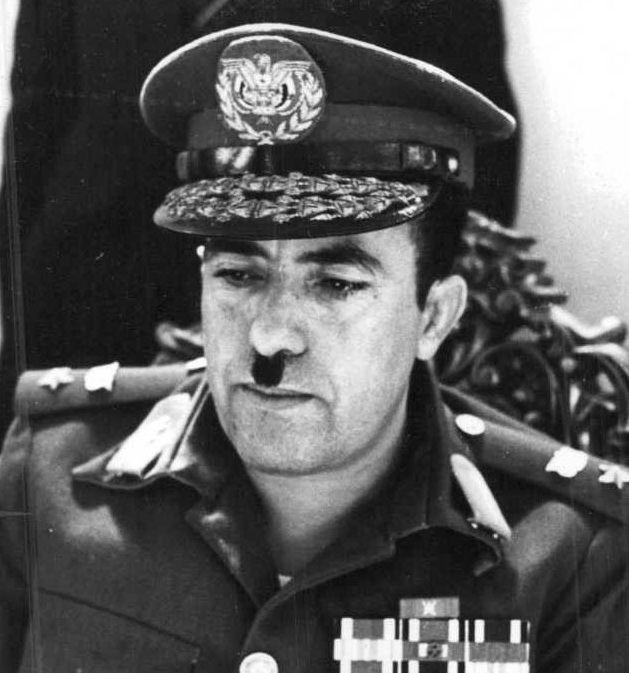
- Ghashmi in 1976

4th President of North Yemen
- In office 11 October 1977 – 24 June 1978
- Prime Minister: Abdul Aziz Abdul Ghani
- Preceded by: Ibrahim al-Hamdi
- Succeeded by: Abdul Karim Abdullah al-Arashi

Chairman of the Military Command Council
- In office 11 October 1977 – 22 April 1978
- Preceded by: Ibrahim al-Hamdi

Deputy Chairman of the Military Command Council
- In office 13 June 1974 – 11 October 1977

Personal details
- Born: 21 August 1935 Hamdan District, Sanaa Governorate, Kingdom of Yemen
- Died: 24 June 1978 (aged 42) Sanaa, North Yemen
- Cause of death: Assassination
- Party: None (Military)

Military service
- Allegiance: Kingdom of Yemen (1956–1962); North Yemen (1962–1978)
- Years of service: 1956–1978
- Rank: Major General
- Battles/wars: North Yemen Civil War; First Yemenite War

Ahmad bin Hussein al-Ghashmi (Arabic: أحمد حسين الغشمي, romanized: Aḥmad Ḥusayn al-Ghašmī; 21 August 1935 – 24 June 1978) was a Yemeni military officer who served as the fourth President of the Yemen Arab Republic (North Yemen) from 11 October 1977 until his assassination eight months later. Al-Ghashmi had assumed power when his predecessor, Ibrahim al-Hamdi, was likewise assassinated.

== Early life and career ==
Ahmed al-Ghashmi was born on 21 August 1935 in Hamdan District, Sanaa Governorate, North Yemen. According to some sources he was born in 1938, but according to others he was born in 1941.

After the coup d'état of September 26, 1962 and the subsequent outbreak of the North Yemen Civil War (1962-1970) began. Al-Gashmi defected to the republican side of Abdullah al-Sallal against the royalists under Muhammad al-Badr.

In 1974, al-Ghashmi allied himself with Ibrahim al-Hamdi and other officers in opposition to President Abdul Rahman al-Eryani. This resulted in a coup d'état known as the June 13th Movement, which led to the overthrow of the government and the establishment of a Military Command Council, which al-Ghashmi joined and became a Deputy Chairman. By the time Ibrahim al-Hamdi was president of North Yemen, al-Gashmi was vice president of the Leadership Council and Chief of Staff of the Armed Forces.

On 11 October 1977, al-Hamdi was assassinated and al-Ghashmi took over the country. A man believed to be a Saudi agent was accused of assassinating the president. Al-Gashmi himself was also suspected.

== Activities as President ==
President al-Ghashmi reinstated the 1970 Constitution, which had previously been suspended by al-Hamdi, the country's previous president, in 1974. However, an important body such as the Consultative Council was not reinstated, and at the same time the office of the president was introduced. The presidency was restored on 22 April 1978, when the Constituent People's Assembly approved the abolition of the Military Command Council and appointed al-Ghashmi as president.

He appointed Ali Abdullah Saleh as military governor in Taiz, who became the next president.

== Assassination ==
President al-Ghashmi's assassination occurred on 24 June 1978 when he was meeting an envoy sent by People's Democratic Republic of Yemen President, Salim Rubai Ali. A briefcase, reportedly containing a secret message, exploded, killing both al-Ghashmi and the envoy. It is not conclusively known who set off the explosion. Ali himself would later be killed two days later.

== See also ==
- NDF Rebellion
- List of heads of state of Yemen

Preceded by Ibrahim al-Hamdi	President of North Yemen; 1977–1978	Succeeded by Abdul Karim Abdullah al-Arashi
