= President of the Yemen Arab Republic =

- رئيس الجمهورية العربية اليمنية
- Coat of arms of North Yemen

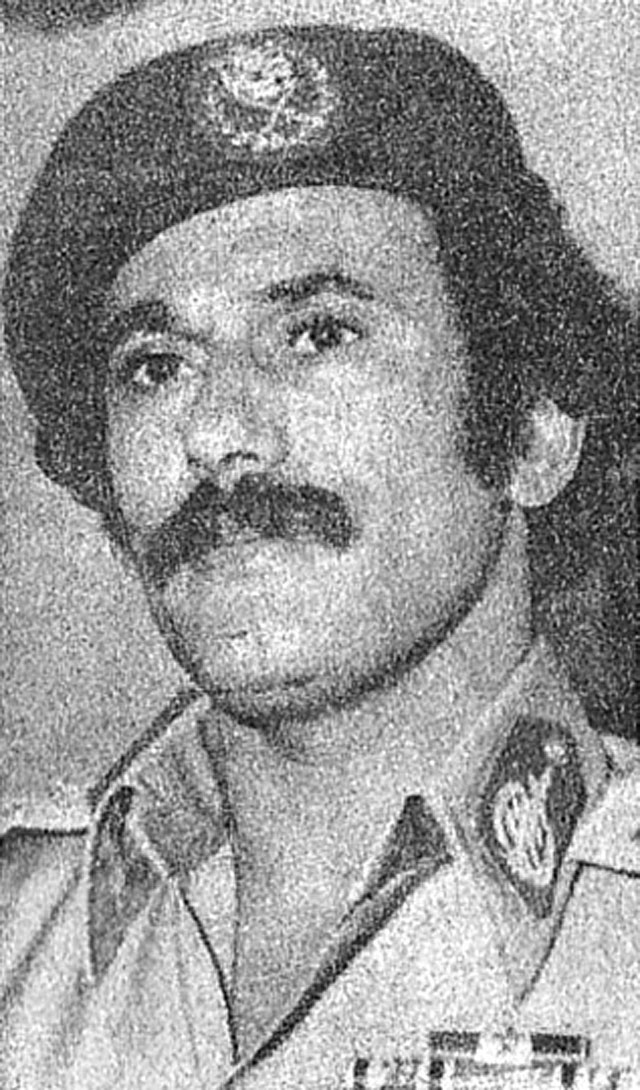
- Longest serving Ali Abdullah Saleh; 18 July 1978 – 22 May 1990
- Residence: Sanaa, Yemen
- Precursor: Imam of Yemen
- Formation: 27 September 1962
- First holder: Abdullah al-Sallal
- Final holder: Ali Abdullah Saleh
- Abolished: 22 May 1990
- Succession: President of Yemen

The President of the Yemen Arab Republic, officially the Chairman of the Republican Council of the Yemen Arab Republic, was the head of state in the former North Yemen from 1962 to 1990. There were six presidents of North Yemen.

== List of Presidents of the Yemen Arab Republic (1962–1990) ==
No.	Portrait	Name (Birth–Death)	Term start	Term end	Political Party
1		Abdullah al-Sallal عبد الله السلال (1917–1994)	27 September 1962	5 November 1967	Military
2		Abdul Rahman al-Iryani عبد الرحمن الإرياني (1910–1998)	5 November 1967	13 June 1974	Independent
3		Ibrahim al-Hamdi إبراهيم الحمدي (1943–1977)	13 June 1974	11 October 1977	Military
4		Ahmad al-Ghashmi أحمد حسين الغشمي (1935–1978)	11 October 1977	24 June 1978	Military
5		Abdul Karim Abdullah al-Arashi عبد الكريم عبد الله العرشي (1934–2006)	24 June 1978	18 July 1978	Independent
6		Ali Abdullah Saleh علي عبدالله صالح (1947–2017)	18 July 1978	24 August 1982	Military
(6)		Ali Abdullah Saleh علي عبدالله صالح (1947–2017)	24 August 1982	22 May 1990	General People's Congress

For presidents of Yemen after 1990, see President of Yemen.

== See also ==
- Imams of Yemen
- Prime Minister of Yemen Arab Republic
- List of heads of state of Yemen
- List of leaders of South Yemen
