= Abdul Karim Abdullah al-Arashi =

President of North Yemen in 1978 (1934–2006)

Abdul Karim Abdullah Al-Arashi
- عبد الكريم عبد الله العرشي
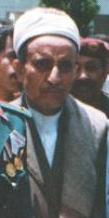
- Al-Arashi in 1990

President of North Yemen (Chairman of the Presidential Council of Yemen Arab Republic)
- In office 24 June 1978 – 18 July 1978
- Prime Minister: Abdul Aziz Abdul Ghani
- Deputy: Ali Abdullah Saleh
- Preceded by: Ahmad al-Ghashmi
- Succeeded by: Ali Abdullah Saleh

Vice President of North Yemen (Yemen Arab Republic)
- In office 11 October 1977 – 24 June 1978
- President: Ahmad al-Ghashmi
- Preceded by: Ahmad al-Ghashmi
- Succeeded by: Himself

First Vice President of Yemen Arab Republic
- In office July 1978 – May 1990
- President: Ali Abdullah Saleh
- Preceded by: Himself

President of the North Yemen legislature
- In office February 1978 – 22 May 1990
- Preceded by: Abdullah ibn Husayn al-Ahmar

Personal details
- Born: 22 July 1929 Sanaa, North Yemen
- Died: 10 June 2006 (aged 76) Riyadh, Saudi Arabia

Abdul Karim Abdullah al-Arashi (Arabic: عبد الكريم عبد الله العرشي, romanized: ʿAbd al-Karīm ʿAbd Allāh al-ʿArāshī; 22 July 1929 – 10 June 2006) was a Yemeni politician who served as the interim President of the Yemen Arab Republic briefly from 24 June to 18 July 1978. He was preceded by Ahmed Al-Ghashmi and succeeded by Ali Abdullah Saleh. He also served as Vice President of Yemen Arab Republic, from 1978 to 1990, and the Speaker of the Constituent People's Assembly (Parliament) from 1978 to 1988, and the president of the Shura Council from 1988 to 1990.

A statement by the president's office noted that Al-Arashi played an important role in the 1962 Yemeni revolution and in defending its goals. “Throughout the various positions he held, he proved to be steadfast and highly competent,” the statement indicated.

He died on June 10, 2006, in Riyadh, Saudi Arabia, aged 76.

== Early life ==
Born in 1934 in Sanaa, North Yemen, Al-Arashi received his basic education in Sanaa and completed his studies at the Scientific School. He then embarked upon judiciary and administrative work while he was young. After the September 26 revolution, he became more prominent at the political level, as he participated in various military campaigns in defence of the revolution.

== Career ==
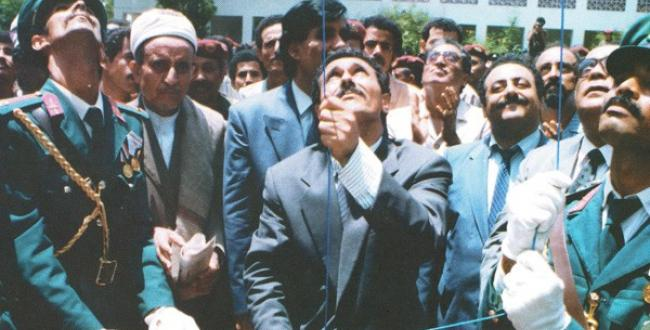
Vice president Abdul Karim Abdullah Al-Arashi with then-president Ali Abdullah Saleh during the announcement of unified Yemen, 1990

Al-Arashi held numerous prominent positions, being appointed Minister of Finance twice, during which he established the state's first budget. He also was appointed Minister of Local Administration whereupon he reformulated the Local Governance Law.

Following President Ahmed Al-Ghashmi's assassination, He was appointed Chairman of the Presidential Council of the former Yemen Arab Republic (also known as North Yemen) from June 24 to July 18, 1978. Shortly thereafter, he was elected chairman of the People's Council (Parliament) as well as vice president in the same year.

In 1988, Al-Arashi unanimously was elected Shura Council president. Two years later, namely on the occasion of reunification, he was elected a member of the Presidential Council. In 1997, he was appointed a consultant to the president.

Political offices
Preceded by Ahmad al-Ghashmi	President of North Yemen; 1978	Succeeded by Ali Abdullah Saleh
