= Yemen Arab Republic =

Country in West Asia (1962–1990)

Coordinates: 15°21′17″N 44°12′24″E

Yemen Arab Republic الجمهورية العربية اليمنية (Arabic) al-Jumhūriyyah al-‘arabiyyah al-Yamaniyyah
- 1962–1990
- Flag Coat of arms (1974–1990)
- Anthem: "Peace to the Land" (1962–1978) إرادة أمة 'Iiradat 'Uma "A Nation's Will" (1978–1990)
- Location of North Yemen (red)
- Capital and largest city: Sanaa
- Official languages: Arabic
- Religion: Islam (predominantly Zaydi Shia and Shafi'i Sunni Islam)
- Demonym: Yemeni
- Government: Unitary parliamentary republic: under a Nasserist provisional military junta (1962–1967, 1974–1978); under a one-party (Note: In 1982, the General People’s Congress was established as the sole legal party of the Saleh regime.) authoritarian dictatorship (1978–1990)
- President
  - 1962–1967 (first): Abdullah al-Sallal
  - 1967–1974: Abdul Rahman al-Eryani
  - 1974–1977: Ibrahim al-Hamdi
  - 1977–1978: Ahmad al-Ghashmi
  - 1978–1990 (last): Ali Abdullah Saleh
- Prime Minister
  - 1962–1963 (first): Abdullah al-Sallal
  - 1983–1990 (last): Abdul Aziz Abdul Ghani
- Legislature: Consultative Council
- Historical era: Cold War
  - Coup d'état: 26 September 1962
  - Monarchy abolished: 1 December 1970
  - Unification: 22 May 1990

Area
  - Total: 136,000 km^{2} (53,000 sq mi)

Population
  - Estimate: 6,000,000 (1970)
- Currency: North Yemeni rial
- Time zone: UTC+3
- Calling code: +967
Preceded by	Succeeded by
Kingdom of Yemen	Yemen
- Today part of: Yemen

The Yemen Arab Republic (YAR; Arabic: الجمهورية العربية اليمنية al-Jumhūriyyah al-‘arabiyyah al-Yamaniyyah), also known as Yemen (Sanaʽa) and commonly referred to as North Yemen, was a country that existed from 1962 until its unification with the People's Democratic Republic of Yemen (commonly known as South Yemen) in 1990, in the northwestern part of what is now Yemen. Its capital was Sana'a. It bordered South Yemen to the southeast, Saudi Arabia to the north and the Red Sea to the west, sharing maritime borders with Djibouti and the People's Democratic Republic of Ethiopia.

The Yemen Arab Republic was formed in 1962, when a coup in the capital Sana'a saw Nasserist military officers overthrow the monarchy and proclaim a republic. The overthrow triggered an 8-year civil war that ended with the defeat of the monarchists and the victory of pro-republican forces. The following years were marked by political instability, civil conflicts, frequent political assassinations and military coups: the country was ruled by a military junta from 1962 to 1967 and again from 1974 to 1978. Relative stability began with the rise to power of Ali Abdullah Saleh, who was able to successfully consolidate his position in the government. The YAR eventually managed to establish good relations with many Arab states and the United States, for which it served as a counterweight to communist South Yemen, but it maintained ties with the USSR, relying on the weapons it purchased from it. On May 22, 1990, the YAR united with the PDRY (South Yemen) to form the current Republic of Yemen, under the leadership of Saleh.

== Background ==
=== Mutawakkilite Kingdom of Yemen ===
Following the dissolution of the Ottoman Empire in 1918 after the First World War, northern Yemen became an independent state as the Mutawakkilite Kingdom of Yemen.

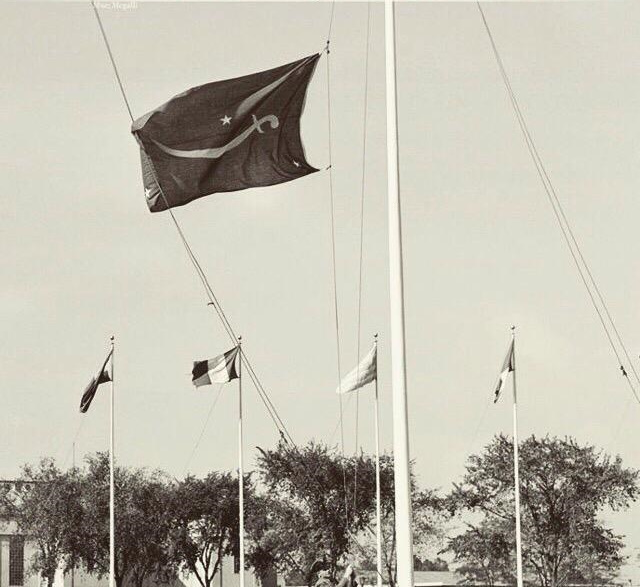
Kingdom of Yemen flag in the UN.

The first king of the independent country was Yahya Muhammad Hamid ad-Din. Having declared Yemen's independence from the Ottomans, he proclaimed himself king and achieved international recognition for the kingdom in 1926. Hamid ad-Din created the kingdom's first regular army. He fought a war with Saudi Arabia and did not recognize his border with the British protectorate of Aden, leading to periodic clashes with British troops. But he focused primarily on consolidating his power and creating a viable central government and appointed his sons to rule various provinces of the kingdom. After almost 30 years of rule (30 October 1918 – 17 February 1948 as a king), he was assassinated in what became known as the Al-Waziri coup. He was succeeded by his son, Ahmad bin Yahya. Like his father, Ahmad was a conservative. Ahmad's ruthless, arbitrary, and inconsistent rule made him the target of coup attempts and frequent assassination attempts, which he narrowly escaped. His enemies ranged from ambitious family members to forward-looking pan-Arabists and Republicans. His abrupt temperament and unpredictable behaviour united and set against him a variety of enemies. The monarchy deliberately exploited the kingdom's highly fragmented tribal society and used frequent tribal wars for remaining in power. In foreign policy, his only constant goal was to expel Britain from Aden in order to annex it to his kingdom. But he was not destined to realize his ambitions: he died suddenly in his sleep on September 19, 1962.

Throughout the existence of the absolute monarchy, Yemen was a very underdeveloped state. The complete conservatism of the kings and the unwillingness of the absolute monarchy to modernize in general brought with them the unfortunate but quite logical consequences of an underdeveloped economy and almost complete absence of roads or motor transport. The kingdom was predominantly an agricultural country. The rule of Hamid ed-Din (Although Hamid ad-Din took some steps towards creating a modern state, they were not enough) and especially Ahmad was always autocratic and conservative; Ahmad never brooked suggestions. Yemen remained a semi-feudal state, where every detail, no matter how insignificant or trivial, had to be approved by the imam, even for a government truck to move in Taiz or for mules to get fodder.

== History ==
=== The coup d'etat and a civil war ===
The Yemeni kingdom's lack of modernity and development led to revolutionary and anti-monarchist ideas in various layers of society. The army also fell victim to dissent. It had many anti-monarchist soldiers and officers with Republican and Nasserist views. In 1962, at least four plots against the king were planned in Yemen, two of which were prepared by military commanders. In December 1961, the Organization of Free Officers (similar to the Nasserist "Free Officers Movement" in Egypt) was created in the Yemeni Kingdom, the purpose of which was to coordinate an anti-monarchist coup.

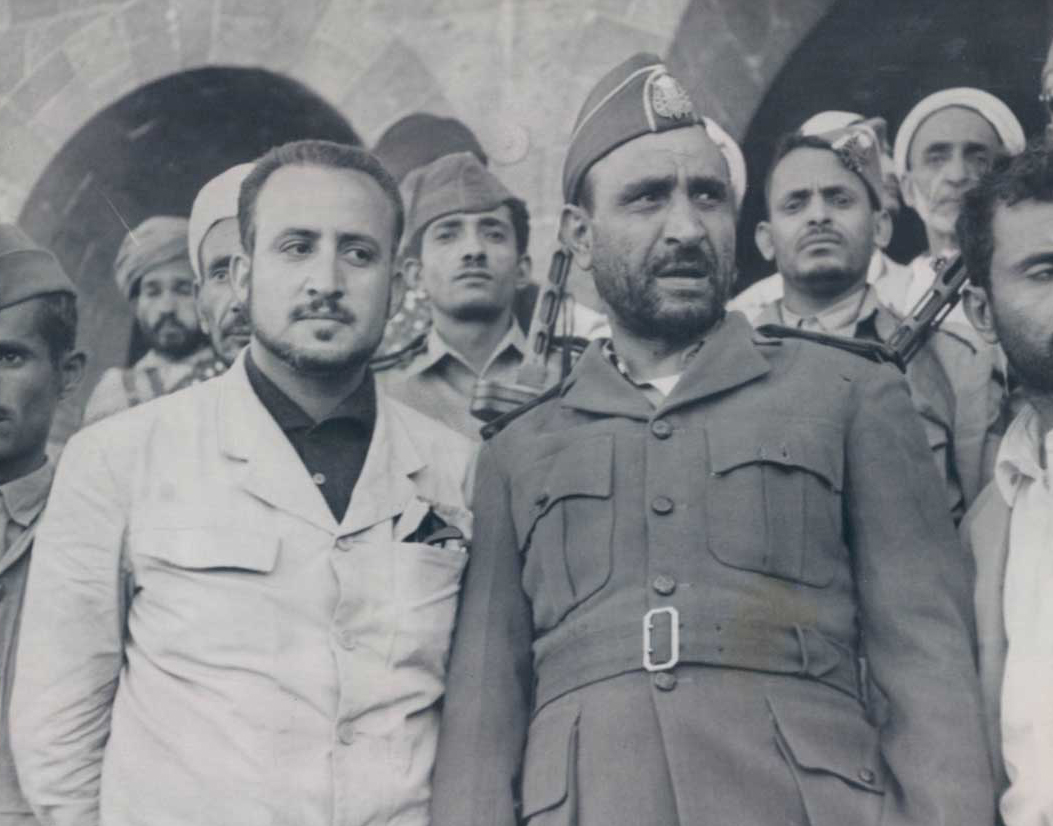
Abdullah al-Sallal, one of the main organizers of the coup (in military uniform), 1962.

But King Ahmad died suddenly, throwing the plotters into disarray. His son Muhammad al-Badr was crowned in his place on September 19. Badr promised to modernize Yemen so that it could "catch up with the caravan of world progress." We will probably never know whether he had any intention of implementing the promised reforms in the long term, because the military revolutionaries quickly switched its plot from the king to his son. Just a week after Badr's coronation, a coup took place in Sana'a on September 26 in which a group of Nasserist officers called the Revolutionary Command Council overthrew the Yemeni monarchy. King Badr and his accomplices fled. The new government declared the birth of the "Free Yemeni Republic", abolished slavery, a curfew was imposed and the Yemeni military police was formed. The coup in the north almost coincided (and inspired) with the beginning of the uprising and emergency in the south (in Aden). The first country to recognize the republic was the USSR. Two days after the coup, Abdullah al-Sallal, one of the main organizers of the coup and the first president of the newborn republic, said: "The corrupt monarchy which ruled for a thousand years was a disgrace to the Arab nation and to all humanity. Anyone who tries to restore it is an enemy of God and man!".

But Badr not only survived, but was also able to unite a lot of the tribes that supported him in the opposition to Sallal. He received support from other monarchies (such as Saudi Arabia and Jordan), who were afraid of Sallal's revolutionary nasserist regime and feared that the coup would spread to their monarchy too (Al-Sallal opened the Arabian Peninsula Office in 1963 and openly called for the overthrow of the Saudi monarchy and the creation of a unified socialist Arabia). At the same time, Egypt began to support Sallal's government, supplying them weapons, military advisers and even sending Egyptian forces to fight against royalists later. As a result, this coup d'état marked the beginning of the North Yemen Civil War that pitted republican troops, assisted by the United Arab Republic (Egypt), against Badr's royalist forces, supported by Saudi Arabia and Jordan.

The war was very expensive for Egypt. In 1967, most of the Egyptian troops were withdrawn from North Yemen following the Six-Day War. In November 1967, the royalists laid siege to the capital Sana'a, but the Republican resistance was not suppressed and, in February 1968, the siege was lifted. Despite the fact that territorially, most of Yemen remained under the control of al-Badr, most of the big cities remained in the hands of the Republicans and their Egyptian allies. In 1970 Saudi Arabia, the main ally of King Badr, which was a fundamental enemy of the republican regime, suddenly recognized the Yemen Arab Republic, and other countries, such as the United Kingdom, quickly followed its example. For Badr, this was a complete surprise and humiliation as no one consulted with him, and so, after 8 years, the Republicans de facto won a cruel war, which officially ended in December 1, and received recognition of their republic. The civil war further weakened the economy of the newborn republic.

=== Post-war period ===
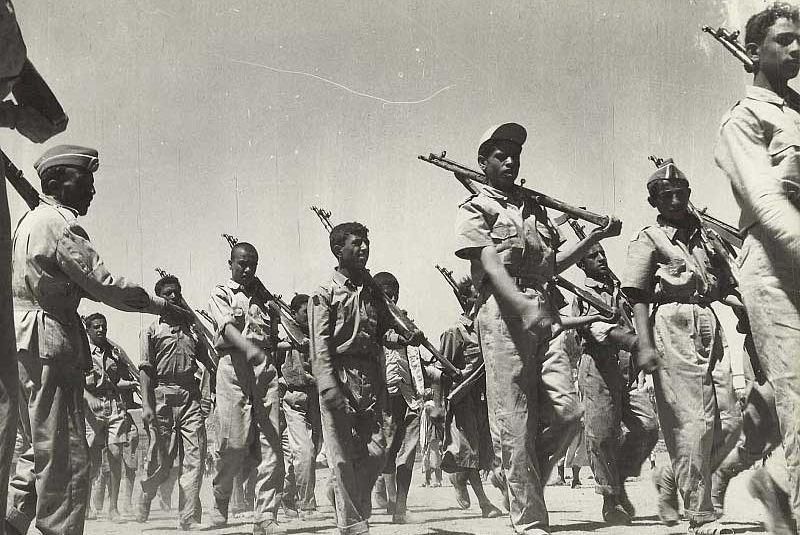
Marching of an pro-republican forces. Army was main power of Yemeni coups in 1970s.

Although the war was over, its consequences remained. The country's already small infrastructure was badly damaged by fighting, bombing and shelling, the weak economy collapsed, and people became even poorer. The first decade after the war was marked by political instability (and several coups of dissident officers).

Rebuilding North Yemen's infrastructure after the civil war proved extremely problematic. Apart from the devastated economy, there were other problems: the military took up to 50 percent of the national budget, amounting to only about £9 million in total, which was hopelessly inadequate in the circumstances. The army was the main social lift, but it (like the government) was riddled with graft and corruption. Controlled by the government, the military's logistics system not only depended on Sana'a's trust in the loyalty of local commanders, but was also susceptible to bribery and corruption. Although various leaders of the Yemen Arab Republic attempted to modernize the state, increase literacy, combat corruption, and rebuild and expand small infrastructure, this did not have the expected impact on the development of the country, which by 1990 remained very underdeveloped, poor, and mired in corruption, largely due to political instability and widespread nepotism.

Back in the 1960s, the Republican government formed the "Ministry of Tribal Affairs" or MTA (Arabic: وزارة شؤون القبائل) to deal with tribal issues and resolve tribe conflicts, which spread under the monarchy. The first president of the Yemen Arab Republic, Abdullah al-Sallal, was overthrown even before the civil war ended, in 1967, and was succeeded by Abdul Rahman al-Eryani, the first and last civilian leader in North Yemen. He opposed the Yemeni monarchy, but made moves to reconcile with royalists at the end of the civil war. In 1970, he reached a national peace accord with many supporters of the royal regime and established formal relations with Saudi Arabia, persuading it to recognize new republic. Under his rule, a unification agreement with South Yemen was reached in 1972 (which formed the basis for unification in 1990), a permanent constitution was adopted, and the first parliamentary elections were held.

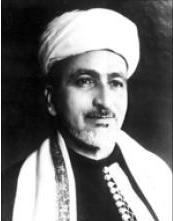
Image of Eryani.

However, during the Eryani period, the Yemen Arab Republic remained a weak country by all measures. In fact, despite the presence of a central government, this government was very weak: North Yemen was in social chaos and was ruled by tribal and military power centers that emerged and strengthened after the overthrow of the officer Sallal in 1967: for example, parliament being dominated by tribal elites. During those times, the penetration of tribal sheikhs into all state institutions reached a new level. All important army units were commanded by tribal sheikhs, and many tribal militias were institutionalized and integrated into the army under Eryani, and leftist militants waged a full-scale guerrilla war against his government from 1971 to 1973. In January 1973, there were direct reports of local uprisings against the sheikhs and the infiltration of armed agents from South Yemen.

=== Military junta seizes power ===
Those problems led to Eryani being overthrown in what became known as the "June 13 Corrective Movement" in 1974 by Military Command Council or MCC - the Nasserist military junta consisted of 7 army's officers - and replaced by Colonel Ibrahim al-Hamdi, the first leader of the MCC.

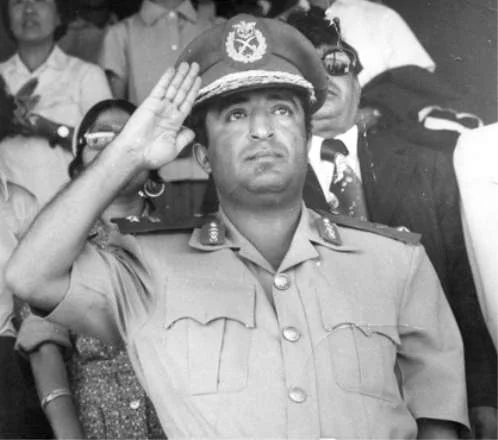
Ibrahim al-Hamdi. Leader of Military Command Council and 3rd president, he was remembered by the Yemeni people as a reformist.

The indirect election system in rural areas, which used during Eryani's period, was suspended by the military junta after a coup, in order to try to reduce the tribal elite's power. Hamdi tried to actively implement reforms within the republic and fought corruption, creating a number of committees to implement them. Unlike Eryani, Hamdi tried to centralize power in the state and actively fought against the influence of large tribes, in all spheres of the country's political and social life. He wanted to unite the tribal country and eliminate inter-tribal conflicts that were active under the monarchy and during the civil war (but at the same time he disbanded MTA, considering it "an obstacle to economic and social development"), reorganized the army (he sought to build a strong and modern army, where soldiers' primary loyalty would be to the state, not their tribes), initiated a grand infrastructure plan and sought to educate the population (he allocated 31% of the country's annual budget to education). He called all these reforms the “Revolutionary Corrective Initiative,” but eventually many of them proved a failure. And also under Hamdi, the role of the army in the political system and public life expanded: the army's intervention in political life returned, and military rule became a feature of the political system. Hamdi also took steps towards rapprochement with the socialist regime in South Yemen and steps towards unity. In February 1977, the "Kataba Agreement" was concluded, which provided for the formation of a Yemeni council of presidents Ibrahim al-Hamdi and Salim Rubaya Ali (South Yemeni president) to discuss and resolve all border issues that concern the united Yemeni people and to coordinate efforts in all areas, including foreign policy. In 1977, Hamdi was assassinated, presumably by a Saudi agent (although there is still no exact information), others suggest he was killed by Abdullah al-Ahmar, the leader of the Hashid tribal confederation and the most powerful tribal sheikh in the YAR.

=== Ahmad al-Ghashmi's period (1977–1978) ===
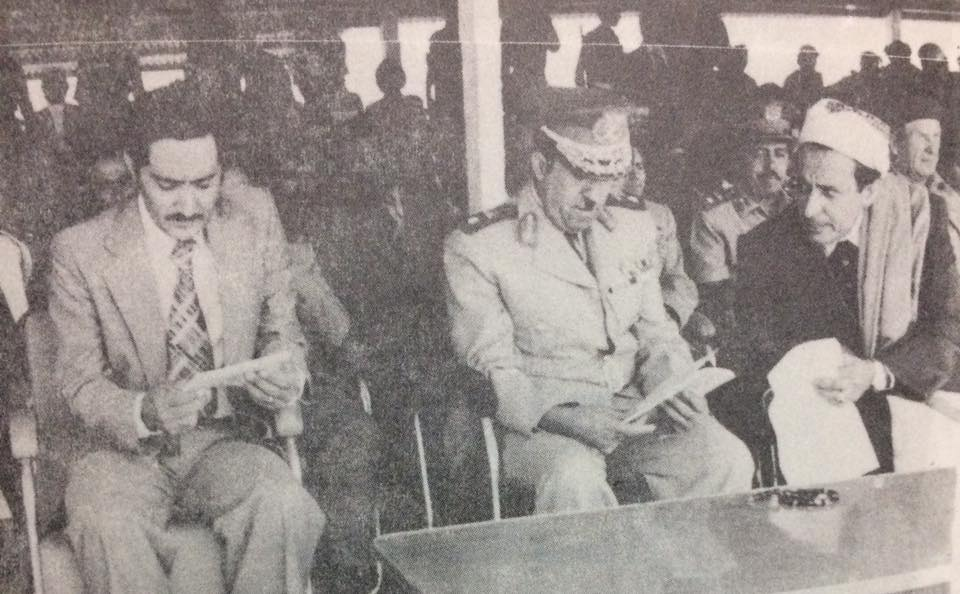
Ahmad al-Ghashmi (in center)

After Hamdi was assassinated, power was taken by another officer: Ahmad al-Ghashmi (He was also suspected of involvement in Hamdi's assassination). Ghashmi was a conservative, unlike his predecessor, and advocated rolling back Hamdi reforms. He also was known for his closeness to Saudi Arabia (he once called for unity with Saudi Arabia) and opposed Hamdi's attempts to reduce Saudi influence in Yemen. He issued a decree on February 6, 1978, which provided for the establishment of a Constituent People's Assembly (which is replaced Parliament), in which the influence of tribes dominated. On April 22, 1978, the Constituent People's Assembly voted to dissolve the MCC and appoint Ghashmi as president. In May–June 1978, a uprising began against Ghashmi near the PDRY border, led by leftist major Ali Abd Aalim, one of the members of the disbanded MCC, which is successfully crackdown: 50 people were killed as a result of the uprising. After the uprising was suppressed, Aalim fled to Aden and joined the leftist NDF forces. Not much is known about Ghashmi's presidency. However, he did not hold on to power for long: 8 months after coming to power, he was also assassinated on June 24, 1978.

=== Ali Abdullah Saleh's takeover ===
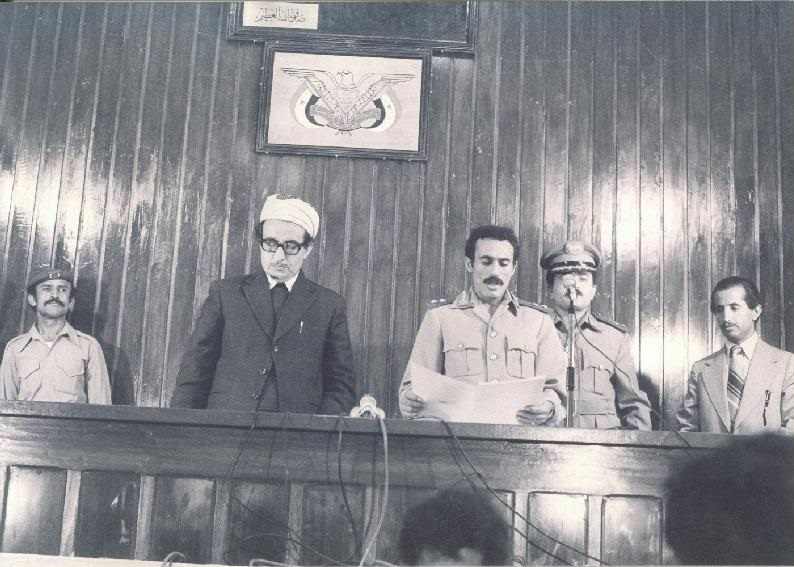
Ali Abdullah Saleh first speech, 1978.

Following the assassination of al-Ghashmi on 24 June 1978, Colonel Ali Abdullah Saleh was appointed a member of the four-member interim presidential council and deputy commander of the General Staff. He became influential already during Hamdi’s rule and used his clout to place his supporters into strategically important positions in the army. On 17 July 1978, Saleh was elected by parliament as President of the Yemen Arab Republic, simultaneously serving as Chief of Staff and Commander-in-Chief of the Armed Forces, in theory controlling all power in the country. But in reality his power was unstable. Few people inside or outside the North Yemen expected him to survive for long, and most expected him to suffer the same fate as his two predecessors. In 1978–1979, several military coups and assassination attempts followed, and a coalition of North Yemeni opposition groups, the National Democratic Front (NDF), launched an initially successful years-long rebellion against the central government, with support from Libya and South Yemen. But to the surprise of outside observers, Saleh outlived them all. He managed to defeat his opponents, and after 4 years of rebellion, he was able to suppress the NDF forces in 1982 with the support of the United States and Taiwan. Saleh tried to reconcile with the tribal leaders whose power some of his predecessors had tried to curtail, for example by bringing the government closer to the Hashid, one of Yemen's tribal confederations (to which Saleh belonged) and its leader Abdullah al-Ahmar. The Hashid confederation became to dominate the security services and play an important role in maintaining the Saleh regime: 70% of the command positions in various security sector institutions or the army were from the Sanhan tribe, which was part of the confederation. He ultimately reversed the reformist program begun by al-Hamdi, opening the way to the corruption that had kept him in power. Saleh carried out major purges of military commanders to eliminate dissent and prevent further coups, and while these purges had a corresponding impact on the army's performance in the second war with southern Yemen, they allowed Saleh to remain in power. End of the 1979 war also allowed him to strengthen his power. In addition to consolidating control over the army, Saleh began creating parallel forces to protect against a coup led by his cronies or relatives. Saleh took control of the Republican Guard, which was stationed around the capital and played a vital role as the regime's defenders. Although it numbered only a few thousand fighters in the late 1970s, the Republican Guard expanded greatly under his regime. Saleh has greatly expanded the army's role in the economy too. His bodyguards numbered hundreds of men, mostly from his own Sanhan tribe.

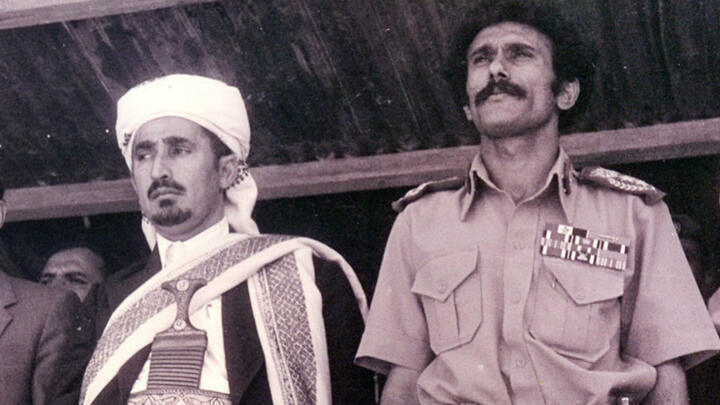
Ali Abdullah Saleh (right) next to Abdullah al-Ahmar (left), circa 1980

Saleh is described as being neither from a "sheikhly family" nor a "large or important tribe" either, but instead rising to power through "his own means", and creating a patronage system with his family at the top. His seven brothers were placed "in key positions", and later he relied on "sons, daughters, sons-in-law and nephews". Beneath the positions occupied by his extended family, Saleh "relied heavily on the loyalty" of two tribes, his own Sanhan tribe and the Hamdan San'a tribe of his mentor, the former president al-Ghashmi. The New York Times Middle Eastern correspondent Robert F. Worth described Saleh as reaching an understanding with powerful feudal "big sheikhs" to become "part of a Mafia-style spoils system that substituted for governance". Robert Worth accused Saleh of exceeding the aggrandisement of other Middle Eastern strongmen by managing to "rake off tens of billions of dollars in public funds for himself and his family" despite the extreme poverty of his country. Saleh's estimated current wealth of $62 billion made him the 5th richest person in the world in the 21st century. Saleh managed to reconcile most factions (though he, like the monarchy before him, exploited tribal conflicts and played off those who threatened his power), improved relations with Yemen's neighbors, and relaunched various programs of economic and political development and institutionalization. He led Yemen into the oil age. However, citizens felt little benefit from his development programs, since it was mainly the top ranks of the government and the army (including Saleh himself) who got rich.

As in the south, Saleh had three titles that were invariably repeated after his first and last name were pronounced: the brother president of the republic, commander-in-chief of the armed forces, and secretary of the General People's Congress.

By the mid-1980s, the North Yemeni state, however weak it was, was much stronger than it had been in the 1970s. Saleh was unable to build a strong economy and equality of all citizens, but he was able to bring stability to the YAR. The Saleh regime was able to establish a strong central government, and strengthen and expand the army and security forces: in 1982, the YAR spent 1,810 million Yemeni rials on the army, which was about three times more than it spent on medicine and education combined (580 million rials that same year), and was able to achieve military parity with the South in the mid-1980s. At the same time, the majority of the North Yemeni population was illiterate and poor. In October 1983, a real crisis occurred: Saleh installed a new Cabinet and introduced strict controls on state imports, which seemed to mark the end of the easy times for North Yemen, dependent on the wealth of the more powerful oil states. Saleh was unable to prevent tribes from joining opposition: In mid-1979, tribal leaders organized a special "Islamic Front" to openly oppose rapprochement with the South (but later Islamic Front became an ally of the government after Saleh changed his policy towards the South and the NDF to a more aggressive one). Moreover, Saleh was still not always able to prevent violent conflicts between tribes too: in 1988, the country fell into a month-long civil war that claimed an estimated 10,000 lives.

=== Unification ===
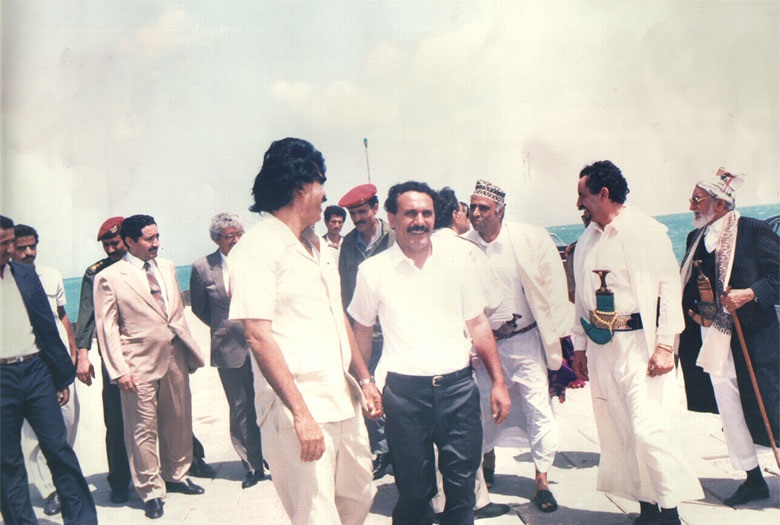
Ali Abdullah Saleh and Ali Salem, General Secretary of the Yemeni Socialist Party since 1986, in 1990.

Against the background of the perestroika in the Soviet Union, political reforms were started in PDRY in the late 1980s too. Political prisoners were released, political parties were formed, and the system of justice was reckoned to be more equitable than in the North. The weakening of the USSR, the main backer of the PDRY, and the reduction of its economic aid pushed South Yemen into new negotiations with the North. In May 1988, the North and South Yemeni governments came to an understanding that considerably reduced tensions. They agreed to renew discussions concerning unification, to establish a joint oil exploration area along their undefined border, to demilitarize the border, and to allow Yemenis unrestricted border passage on the basis of a national identification card.

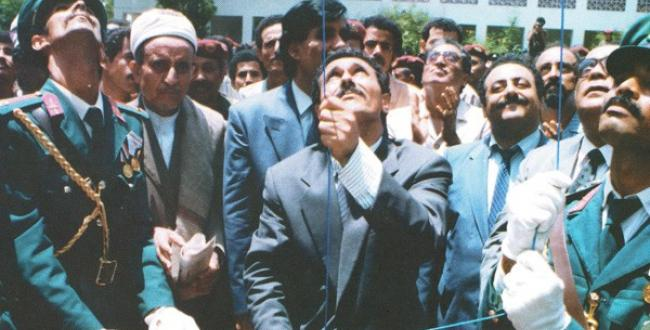
Saleh raising new flag after official Yemeni unification in 1990.

In 1990, the parties reached a full agreement on joint governing of Yemen. Official Yemeni unification took place on 22 May 1990, with a planned, 30-month process, scheduled for completion in November 1992. The first stamp bearing the inscription "Yemen Republic" was issued in October 1990. Saleh and his system of patrons became the president of a united Yemen. While government ministries proceeded to merge, both currencies remained valid until 11 June 1996. Over time, the government of the united Yemen was able to integrate and unite two very different economic and political systems, however, the two Yemeni armies were not united. In 1994, another civil war broke out in Yemen, when the Southerners tried to separate from Northern Yemeni government, clearly feeling the deterioration of their standard of living and their social status. But the central government in Sana'a has brutally, and successfully, suppressed the separatists and prevented another division of Yemen. the former YAR dominated the PDRY in a united Yemen, communists of South Yemen were persecuted, and the south became economically marginalized: for example, income from resources extracted in the South went mainly to the North, and the capital became the city of Sana'a, the capital of the former YAR.

== Economy ==
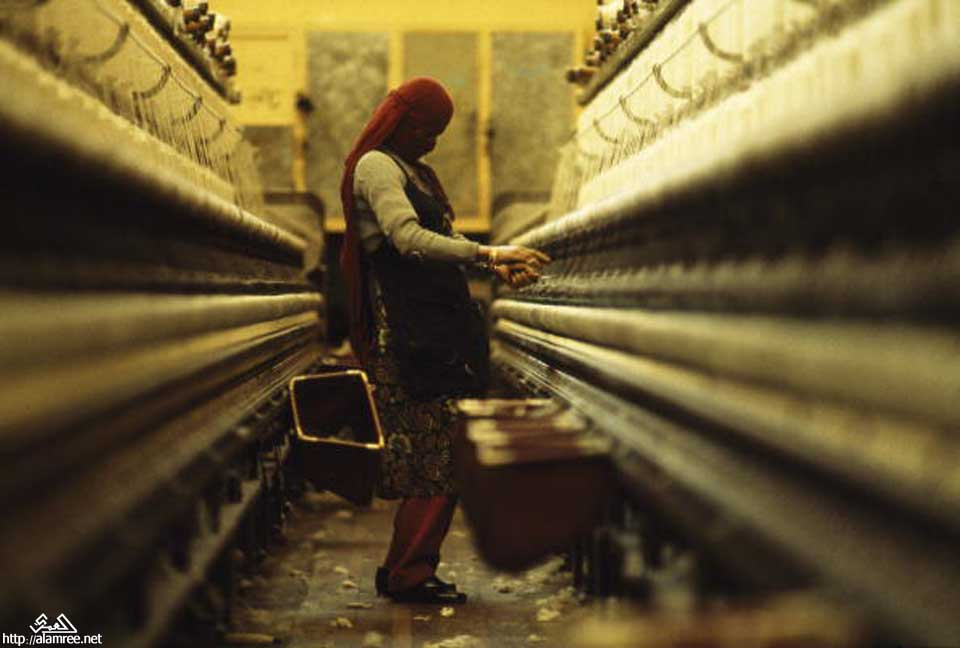
Women in textile industry of North Yemen.

The economies of both North and South Yemen were underdeveloped. However, communist South Yemen was able to provide an overall higher standard of living for all its citizens: scoring better in equality, education, and corruption.

North Yemen's economy has been devastated by civil war, and corruption and nepotism were widespread. The YAR's budget deficit is 30 percent of GNP. The military took up to 50 percent of the national budget. Its exports are minimal, accounting for only 1 percent of its imports, and most of the country's labor force remains rural. In 1984, YAR exports were only $9 million, while imports were $1.4 billion. Many workers had emigrated from the country: more than a million of Yemen's 7.5 million people live in other states on the peninsula (mostly Saudi Arabia). YAR remittances, at about $1 billion a year, represented about 40 percent of GNP. Foreign aid amounted to 17 percent of GNP in 1982. Saudi Arabia provided subsidies to northern tribes estimated at $60 million to $80 million a year.

By 1990, roughly 45 percent of the YAR and South Yemen's national debts were owed to the USSR, chiefly for military equipment.

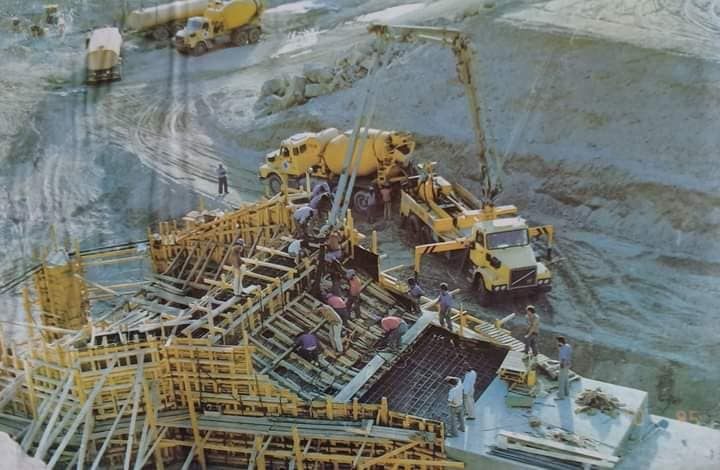
Construction of the Marib Dam in 1986

=== Agriculture ===
About 85 percent of the country's labor force works in agriculture, but the country was nevertheless dependent on imports for 30 percent of its food supplies. It has received significant aid from Saudi Arabia, Kuwait and the United Arab Emirates.

=== Petroleum industry ===
Although oil was an important part of the YAR's exports, the country had not been found to have large reserves. North Yemen has received significant aid from Saudi Arabia, Kuwait and the UAE, but was not a candidate for membership in the Gulf Cooperation Council, a group of six Arab oil producers on the peninsula established in May 1981. As one senior government official put it: "There are reasons why we won't be allowed to join. First, we're a republic. Second, we're poor. And third, if they let us in, they'll have to let the Iraqis in, too."

== Politics and social life ==
=== Government ===
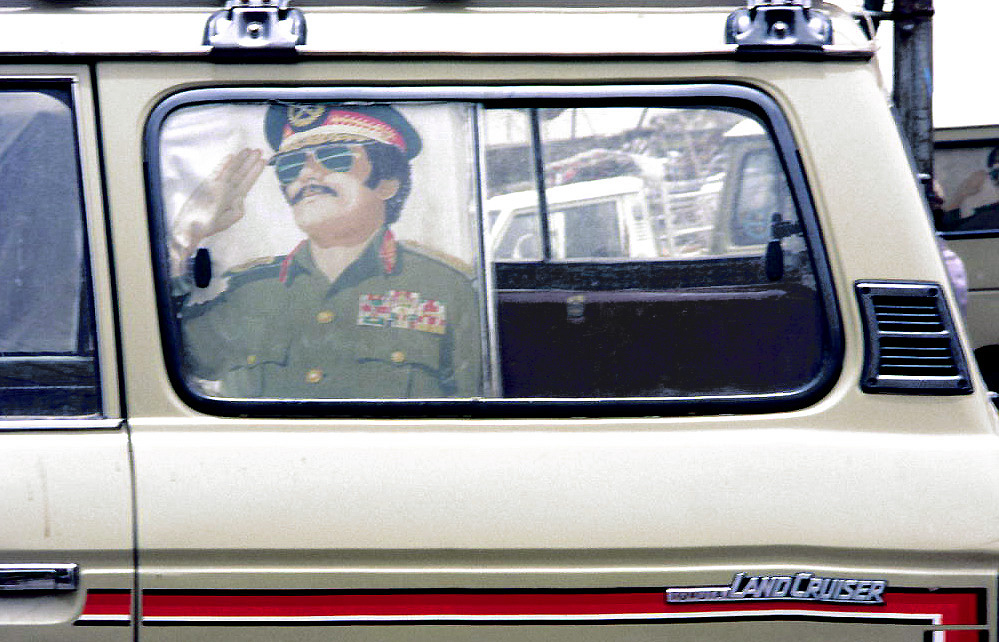
Saleh's portrait, 1987.

North Yemen was considered a Nasserist republic with Islam as its official religion. From 1974 to 1978, the country was ruled by a Nasserist military junta (with Hamdi and Ghashmi as presidents), but in April it was dissolved. After Ali Abdullah Saleh came to power, he created a personalist authoritarian dictatorship alongside a strong patronage system. Saleh's government was characterized by corruption, favoritism towards Hashid members and a general restriction of freedoms. No political parties were permitted in North Yemen, but opaque political coalitions involving the military, tribal leaders, and urban intellectual elements exercised substantial influence. State censorship was prevalent, with some major upheavals, even the 1979 war with South Yemen, not mentioned at all in government media.

List of Government officials of the Yemen Arab Republic, 1985
Office	Incumbent as of 1985
President	Ali Abdullah Saleh
Vice President	Abdul Karim Abdullah al-Arashi
Prime Minister	Abdul Aziz Abdul Ghani
Deputy Prime Minister	Abdul-Karim al-Iryani
Deputy Prime Minister for Domestic Affairs	Lt. Col. Mujahid Yaha Abu Shawarib
Minister of Agriculture and Fisheries	Ahmad Muhammad al-Samman Hamdani
Minister of Civil Service and Administrative Reform	Ismail Ahmad al-Wazir
Minister of Communications and Transport	Ahmad Muhammad al-Ansi
Minister of Development	Muhammad Ahmad al-Junayd
Minister of the Economy and Industry	Ahmad Qaed Barakat
Minister of Education	Husayn Abdullah al-Amri
Minister of Electricity, Water, and Sewage Works	Muhammad Hasan Sabra
Minister of Finance	Muhammad al-Khadam al-Wajih
Minister of Foreign Affairs	Abdul-Karim al-Iryani
Minister of Health	Dr. Muhammad Ahmad al-Kabab
Minister of Information and Culture	Hasan Ahmad al-Lawzi
Minister of the Interior	Lt. Col. Muhsin Muhammad al-Ulufi
Minister of Justice	Ahmad Muhammad al-Jubi
Minister of Labor, Social Affairs, and Youth	Muhammad Ahmad al-Asbuhi
Minister of Local Government	Muhammad Abdullah al-Jaifi
Minister of Municipalities and Housing	Ahmad Muhammad Luqman
Minister of Public Works	Abdullah Husayn al-Kurshumi
Minister of Supply and Trade	Fuad Qayd Muhammad
Minister of State	Husayn Ali al-Hubayshi
Minister of State for the affairs of Yemeni Unity	Yahya Husayn al-Arshi
Minister of State for Cabinet Affairs	Ahmed Salih al-Ruayni
Minister of State for People's Constituent Assembly Affairs	Ali Abdul al-Rahman al-Bahr
Minister of State for Petroleum and Mineral Affairs	Ali Abdul al-Rahman al-Bahr
Minister of State for Youth and Sports	Abdullah Nasir al-Darafi

=== Foreign relations ===
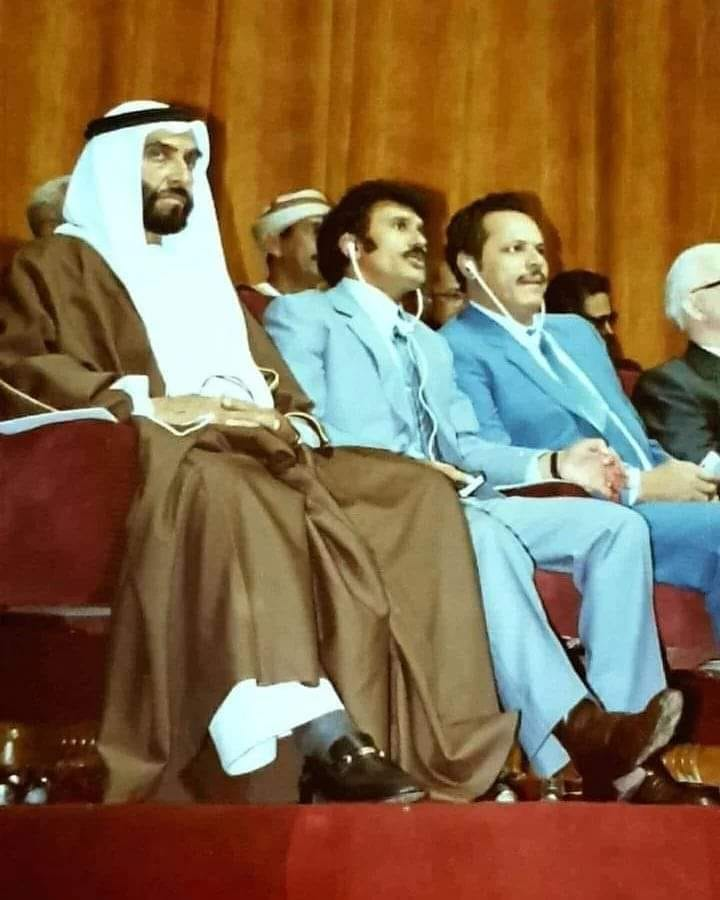
Saleh with Ali Nasir and Zayed in 1987.

Compared to South Yemen (which harbored revolutionary communists from all over the region), the North had better relations with many Arab countries. It criticized the peace initiatives undertaken by Egypt, but did not join the rejectionist camp. It established particularly good relations with Ba'athist Iraq, supporting it from the beginning in the war with Iran and selling some of its Soviet equipment to the Iraqi army, and when the international coalition launched a military actions to liberate Kuwait from Iraq, Yemen did not support its actions. It also received economic aid from Kuwait, the Emirates, and was dependent on Saudi Arabia: for economic reasons, but also because of the influence it wields in North Yemen.

The USSR and YAR never publicly clashed, and the YAR military still relied on Soviet arms (both directly and through intermediaries). However, despite the ties with the USSR and the purchase of its weapons, the main ally of the Yemen Arab Republic remained Saudi Arabia and the United States, seeing it as a counterweight to communist South Yemen. The United States also supported the northern Yemeni regime with money, military advisers, and even aircraft pilots (for example, during the NDF uprising). During a 1979 border war between the North and the South, the United States cooperated with Saudi Arabia to greatly expand the security assistance program to the YAR by providing F-5 aircraft, tanks, vehicles and training. George H. W. Bush, while Vice President, visited in April 1986, and President Ali Abdullah Saleh visited the United States in January 1990. The United States had a $42 million USAID program in 1990. From 1973 to 1990, the United States provided the YAR with assistance in the agriculture, education, and health and water sectors.

=== Relations with South Yemen ===
North and South Yemens on the map.

Unlike the early decades of other partitioned states like East Germany and West Germany, North Korea and South Korea, or North Vietnam and South Vietnam, all of which faced very tense relations or sometimes total wars, the relations between the Yemen Arab Republic and the People's Democratic Republic of Yemen (PDRY) remained relatively friendly throughout most of their existence, although conflicts did arise. Fighting broke out in 1972, and the short-lived conflict was resolved with negotiations, where it was declared unification would eventually occur.

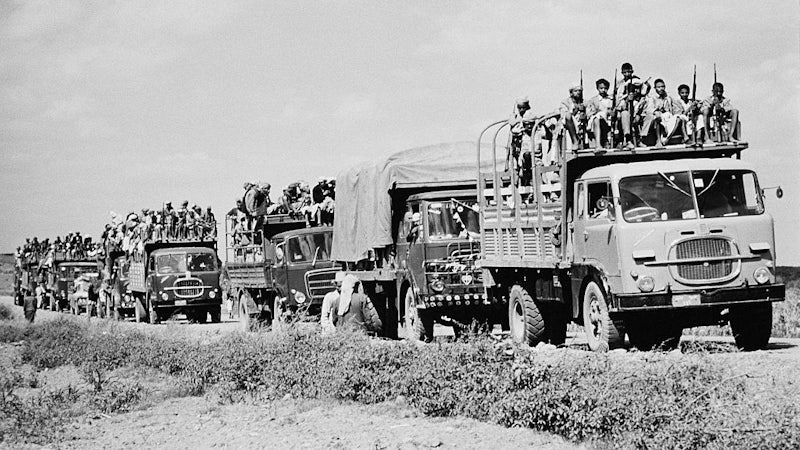
Soldiers and trucks on the border of two Yemens, 1979.

However, these plans were put on hold in 1979, as the PDRY funded Communist rebels in the YAR, and the war reached a stalemate only with increased US support and the use of tribal militias by the YAR regime. The goal of unity was reaffirmed by the northern and southern heads of state during a summit meeting in Kuwait in March 1979. Unity committees of the two Yemens met regularly, and a number of meetings also took place between YAR and NDF officials to discuss prospects for a coalition government. However, under Saudi pressure, by 1980 Saleh had changed course again, he stopped deepening relations with the USSR; unity talks with the South Yemen slowed down, and Sana'a adopted a policy of open hostility toward the NDF (this led to a series of offensives by pro-government forces and now the allied Islamic Front against NDF positions).

Successor of Abdul Fattah Ismail, Ali Nasir Muhammad, became the general secretary of the Yemeni Socialist Party in 1980 and took a less interventionist stance toward both North Yemen and neighbouring Oman: he was interested in improving relations with oil-rich Arab states. A Yemeni council, made up of the two presidents and elected ministers, met twice a year. A draft constitution of 136 articles was prepared, but the council's meetings did not immediately produce any concrete decisions.

=== Living standards and medicine ===
The standard of living in the Yemen Arab Republic was very low. The country had a very low average life expectancy, with 37 years on average for men and 38 for women.

=== Education ===
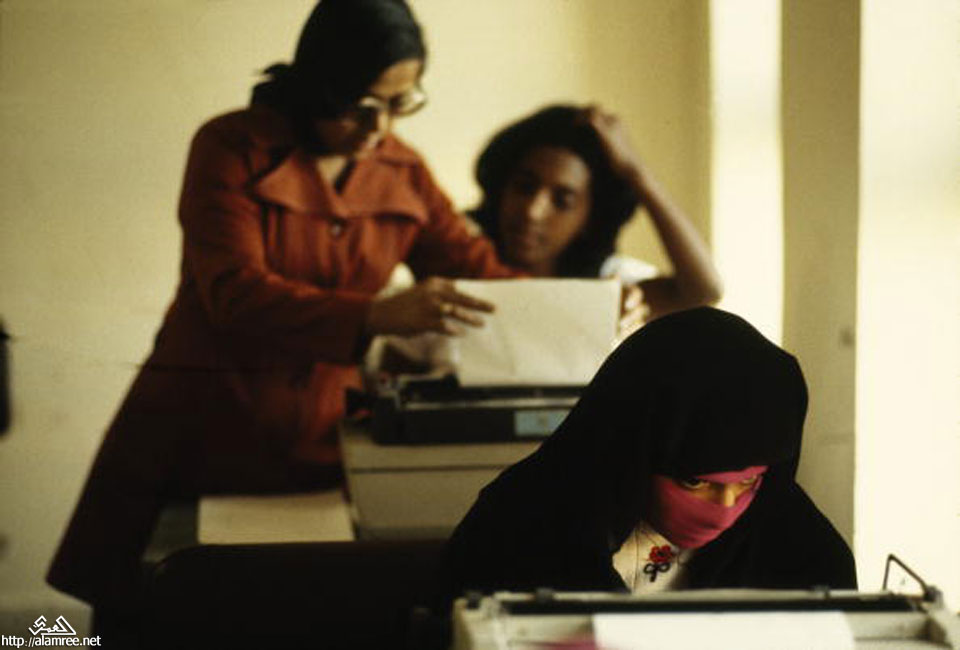
Secretarial Training Institute in Yemen Arab Republic, 1979.

The poor economy and government corruption did not allow for the creation of an adequate education system, and most North Yemenis had no education at all. In 1985, adult illiteracy was over 80 percent (compared to 2 percent illiteracy in south Yemen), and less than 40% of children were enrolled in school.

== Military ==
The formation of a new national army in northern Yemen after the 1962 coup was a difficult one. During the civil war, Sallal relied more on the tens of thousands of Egyptian soldiers sent to support him and volunteer pilots from Syria, than on the Yemeni ranks of the pro-republican forces: a few days after the Imamate was overthrown, Egyptian president Nasser landed 5,000 Egyptian troops in Sana’a to ensure Sallal’s hold on power. With the withdrawal of Egyptian troops in 1967, the Sallal regime was overthrown fairly quickly. In subsequent years, the competence and effectiveness of the government's military was undermined by widespread corruption, strong tribal influence, tribal conflicts, and simply incompetent management. But at the same time, it was the army that provoked all the military coups in Yemen.

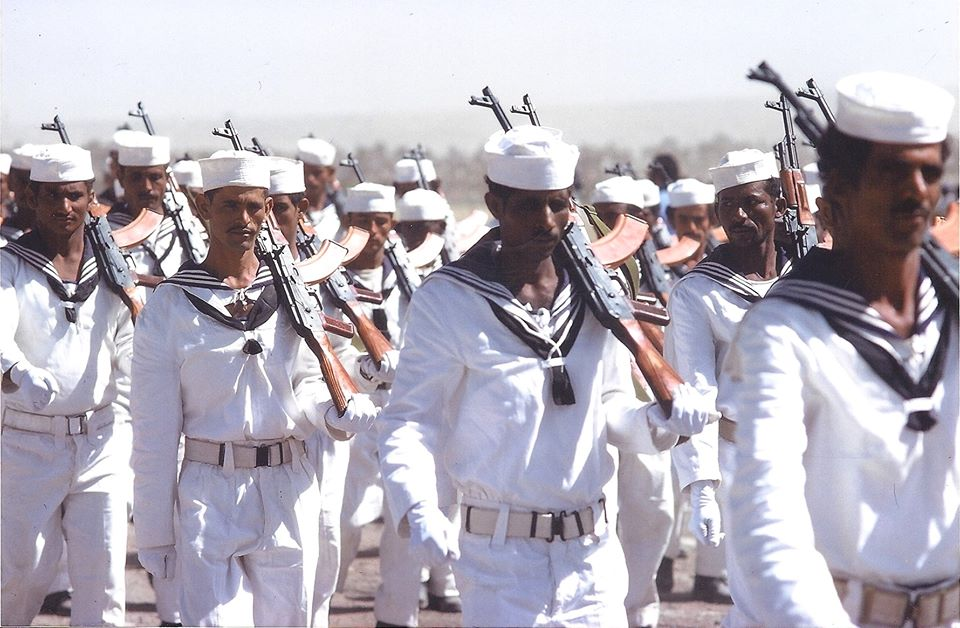
Sailors marching during a military parade in 1976.

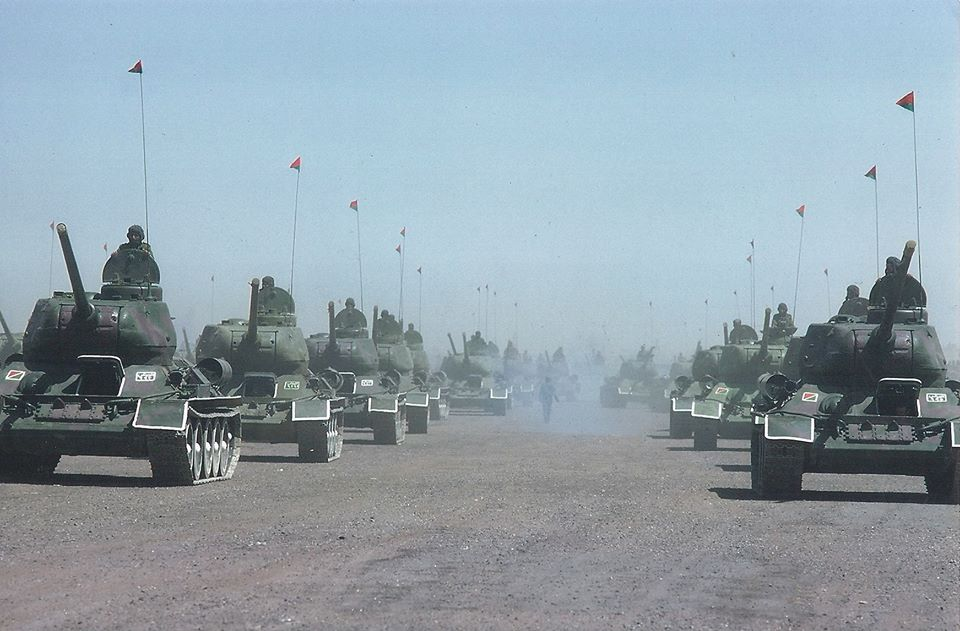
T-34-85 tanks on the parade.

During Hamdi's rule, the army was modernizing and weakening the role of tribes in it, but it is difficult to determine its real combat effectiveness under junta's regime, because it did not fight anywhere during this period of history. The role of the army in government and politics also expanded significantly, and this helped the military junta to stay in power for some time.

But in just a few years in power, the army has become Saleh's most important instrument of control over the regime and an important part of his patronage network. Although the army's involvement in North Yemen's economic activities began in the mid-1970s, Saleh has significantly expanded its intervention in the economy. For example, the Military Economic Corporation (MECO), the army's largest company, was exempt from taxes and had its own budget. This intervention allowed for new sources of income for the army and increased Saleh's personal wealth. Saleh was able to strengthen and expand the army and security forces: in 1982, the YAR spent 1,810 million rials on the army, which was about three times more than it spent on medicine and education combined.

Neither the Northern nor the Southern armies were strong enough to defeat the enemy, what is maintained the status quo, but the army in the North was weaker. However, after the serious defeat of the YAR in 1979, ironically, the balance of power began to change in favor of the loser. Seeing the weakness of its army, the YAR government launched a program to rearm the army with the support of Egypt, Iraq and Saudi Arabia, and by 1983-1984 it had restored its military strength, achieving military parity with the PDRY.

== Flags and coat of arms ==
Flag of North Yemen (1962-1990)
Coat of arms of North Yemen (1962-1963)

Coat of arms of North Yemen (1963-1974)

Coat of arms of North Yemen (1974-1990)

== See also ==
- History of Yemen
- Yemen national football team
- President of North Yemen
- Prime Minister of North Yemen
- United Nations Security Council Resolution 188
