= Ibrahim al-Hamdi =

President of North Yemen from 1974 to 1977

- Arabic: إبراهيم الحمدي
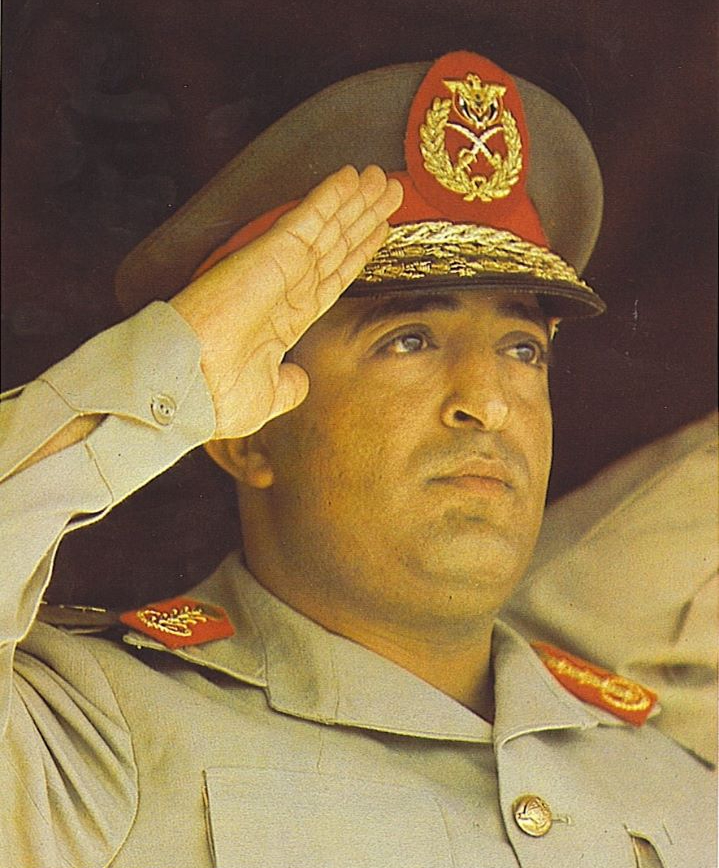
- Al-Hamdi in 1976

3rd President of North Yemen
- In office 13 June 1974 – 11 October 1977
- Prime Minister: Mohsin Ahmad al-Aini; Abdul Latif Dayfallah (Acting); Abdul Aziz Abdul Ghani
- Preceded by: Abdul Rahman al-Iryani
- Succeeded by: Ahmad al-Ghashmi

Chairman of the Military Command Council
- In office 13 June 1974 – 11 October 1977
- Succeeded by: Ahmad al-Ghashmi

Deputy Prime Minister for Internal Affairs
- In office 1972–1974
- President: Abdul Rahman al-Iryani
- Prime Minister: Kadhi Abdullah al-Hagri; Hassan Muhammad Makki

Personal details
- Born: 30 September 1943 Qa'atabah District, North Yemen
- Died: 11 October 1977 (aged 34) Sanaa, North Yemen
- Cause of death: Assassination
- Party: None (Military)
- Nickname: "Brother" (Arabic: "الأخ")

Military service
- Allegiance: North Yemen (1962–1977)
- Branch/service: (Yemen Arab Republic) North Yemeni Army
- Years of service: 1962–1977
- Rank: Lieutenant colonel
- Battles/wars: North Yemen Civil War; First Yemenite War

Ibrahim al-Hamdi (30 September 1943 – 11 October 1977; Arabic: إبراهيم الحمدي, romanized: Ibrāhīm al-Ḥamdī) was a Yemeni military officer who served as the third President of the Yemen Arab Republic (North Yemen) from 13 June 1974 until his assassination on 11 October 1977.

During his rule, he cemented the central government's control over the country, and planned to end tribal loyalty and Yemen's medieval social classes by proclaiming all Yemenis as equal. A social reformer inspired by Nasserism, he opposed tribalism as well as the extensive powers wielded by the military and religious authorities. He promoted the construction of roads and hospitals and sought to forge Yemeni unity.

His policies clashed with the interests of Saudi Arabia and traditional elites, and he was assassinated on 11 October 1977, after three years and four months in power. No official investigation was ever opened, and those responsible for the assassination remain unknown. His memory remained suppressed for a long time, until the overthrow of President Ali Abdullah Saleh during the 2012 Yemeni Revolution, when protesters carried portraits of Ibrahim al-Hamdi.

== Early life and career ==
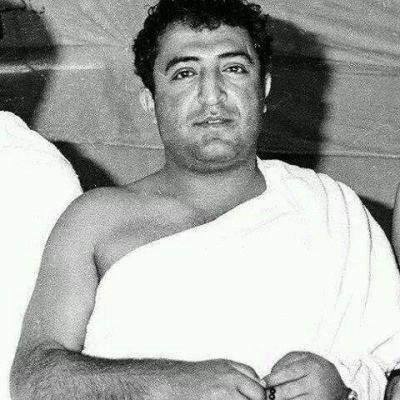
Al-Hamdi in the 1970s during his pilgrimage to Mecca, Saudi Arabia.

Ibrahim al-Hamdi was born in Qa'atabah, Ibb in southwestern Yemen. His family was from the Banu Hamdan tribe.

In his early adulthood he was an associate for his father, who worked as a judge. His father taught him about Islamic law while he was studying in the Aviation College to become a pilot, but did not complete his studies and continued working with his father as a judge in the court of Dhamar during the reign of Imam Ahmed Yahya Hamid al-Din where he raised much controversy and attention.

Then, he became in the era of President Abdullah as-Sallal the commander of the commandos. Then the responsibility for the western, eastern, and central provinces to him in 1972. He was promoted to become the Deputy Prime Minister for Internal Affairs, and then appointed the higher representative Commander of the Armed Forces. On 13 June 1974, he was an effective member of the officers who ran the white military coup overthrowing Abdul Rahman al-Iryani in the revolutionary correction movement of 13 June 1974 and handed over all the president's and the members' of the republican council authorities to the military forces which represented in the leadership of the general and senior officers mentioned: Ahmad Ghashmi, Yahya Mutawakil, Mujahid Abu Shawareb, Ali Al-Shibh, Hammoud Pedder, Ali Alilla'a, AED Abu Meat, Ali Abu Lohoum, and added later Abdaziz Abdul Ghani and Abdullah Abdulalim.

== Economic achievements ==
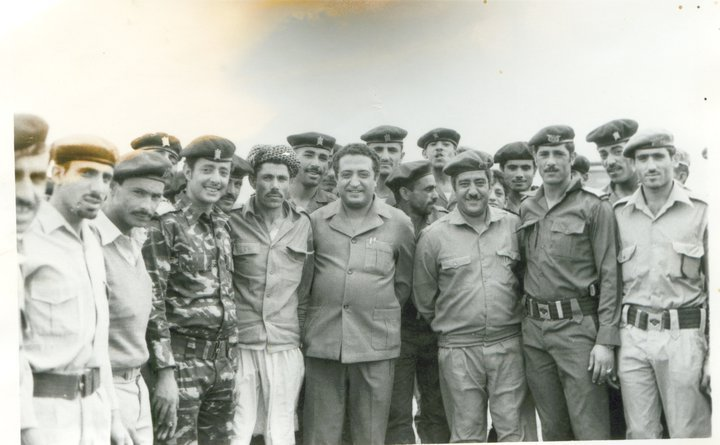
Al-Hamdi and some revolutionary officers during his presidency (1974-1977)

Colonel Ibrahim al-Hamdi led the thirteenth corrective movement. Hamdi aimed to correct the Yemeni revolutionary path, to get rid of a "legacy of decadence." He primarily sought to calm tribal feuds and regional conflicts, which had been prevalent under previous rulers. Thus, security was his top concern. He also promoted financial reforms to put an end to favoritism and bribery. He created committees to implement these reforms, saving estimated tens of millions of Riyals.

Furthermore, he initiated a large infrastructure plan, paving thousands of kilometres of dirt roads, building thousands of schools, and hundreds of clinics and health centres. He encouraged people and many non-local investors to invest in the sections of agriculture and local manufacturing. This period saw rising standards of living and much prosperity.

When al-Hamdi came to power in 1974, North Yemen lacked the most basic services and infrastructure. He created a five-year development plan supervised by a number of committees, which encouraged local communities to contribute "to road construction, school building, and water networks." In an unprecedented move, al-Hamdi allocated 31 percent of North Yemen’s annual budget to education. Believing that education was the cornerstone to development and progress, al-Hamdi implemented a free breakfast program for pupils in remote rural areas to increase access to basic schooling. Moreover, Al-Hamdi made a number of executive decisions during his rule to increase the role of government and promote citizenship and equality. His efforts to eradicate tribal loyalty (including in the military) and establish the rule of law in a country devastated by years of civil conflict were ground-breaking in the Arab world during the 1970s. Al-Hamdi abolished the Ministry of Tribal Affairs (a body he believed was an obstacle to the country’s economic and social advancement) and established the Ministry of Local Administration. He also restructured the North Yemen army and raised the salaries of military and civilian personnel.

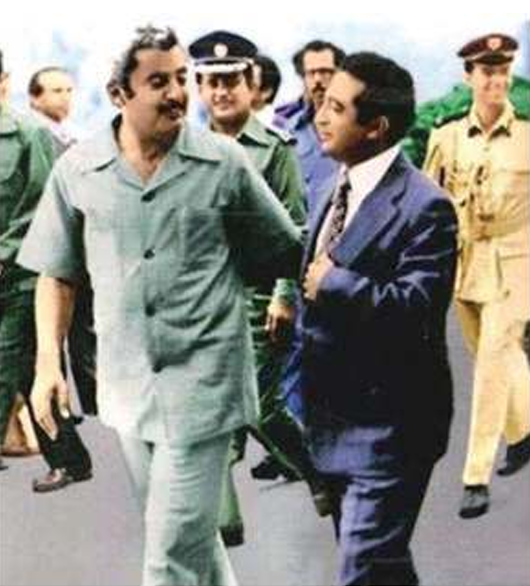
North Yemen's president Ibrahim Al-Hamdi meeting South Yemen's president Salem Rubai Ali on 5 February 1977

During al-Hamdi’s rule, North Yemen witnessed remarkable economic growth, with the country’s GDP rising from 21.5 percent in 1974 to 56.1 percent in 1977. Its per capita income rose by 300 percent in the same period. Al-Hamdi was also planning to establish more democratic institutions in the country by founding what he called "popular conventions." The purpose of these conventions was to "prepare the groundwork for eventual elections" in North Yemen.

However, the tribal forces that allegedly conspired with Saudi Arabia against al-Hamdi did not allow his plans for North Yemen to come to fruition. On October 11, 1977, he was assassinated, along with his brother, in his vice president's house in Sanaa.

This man had started his path to the presidency with arduous efforts, and was assisted by a group of young faces qualified academically to build a modern government based on law, order, and institutions. It was a difficult task, but not impossible for a commander who collected in his persona the power and the model, plus his culture and excellence through his civilian and military experiences, and what was more important is the honor that observed from his family when he worked as a judge (during his short experience in the judiciary while the absence of his father Judge Mohammed Saleh Al-Hamdi all provisions was ending to between the rivals) so he learned two rules: that justice is the base of governance, and the base of governance is the fear of Allah. Thus he proved his worth as a national leader through several works in addition to justice, including:

- Laying a long-term economic plan to develop the country.
- Paying all the government debt and started to loan the World Bank.
- Helping reduce the power of tribes and Saudi backed sheikhs and strengthening the rule of law.
- Putting down all military ranks, which amounted to inflation and their holders to satisfy providers including his rank to attributed the soldier's and officers lost prestige.
- Preventing the use of government vehicles and military or public institutions cars for personal purposes.
- Increasing the salary along with four additional salaries in some occasions like Eid al-Fitr and Eid al-Adha, the anniversary of the revolution and the anniversary of the thirteen of June Movement.

Under Al-Hamdi's administration, Yemen enjoyed the most prosperous economic boom since 1962, as he was responsible for a civil engineering endeavour that would usher in an era of unprecedented economic growth in Yemen's post-Imamate history. More specifically, Hamdi fostered the creation of 'Local Development Associations,' which functioned as autonomous community-based institutions focused on developing local infrastructure. Scholar Isa Blumi notes that while "Able to exclusively access the potential tax revenue under their jurisdictions, the committees created from members of the community could also solicit external funds and loans (almost exclusively drawn from local, non-banking sources) independently of the central state and bank now formally connected to the outside world." In other words, during the 1970s the LDAs did the heavy lifting as far as the development of Yemen's infrastructure was concerned. What is more, the locally driven LDAs protected the Yemeni countryside from an influx of foreign finance capital (disguised as development 'aid' and often tethered to massive usury rates). The LDA system thus preserved Yemen's economic sovereignty until 1978.

== Military ==
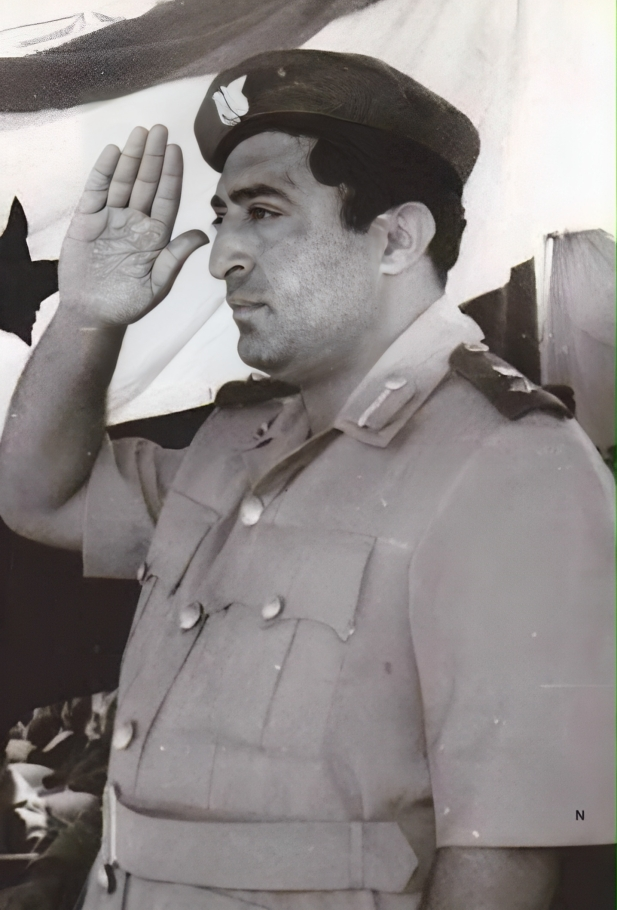
Hamdi in military uniform, circa 1976

During his rule, Al Hamdi built up the Yemeni defenses in Bab al Mandab and on Yemeni islands and modernized and expanded the Yemeni Navy. He reorganised the Yemeni army into four main forces:

- The Giants forces: These forces were formed from merging the Giants brigade with regular units, as a military strike force in Dhamar governorate. Its commander was Abdullah Al Hamdi, the president's brother
- General Reserve Forces: It was formed when the Storm brigade and the Reserve brigade were merged.
- Parachute forces: Formed from the Thunderbolt corps, the Parachute corps and the Commando brigade.
- Military Police Forces: Formed from the Military Police Corps and the Security Command.

== Assassination ==
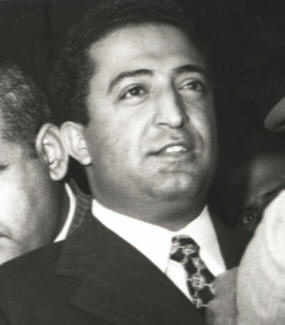
Hamdi in 1977, shortly before his assassination

The circumstances of al-Hamdi's death remain undetermined, although the perpetrator is widely assumed to be a Saudi agent. Those believed to have conspired against the life of the President were the Chief of Staff of the Armed Forces, Lt. Col. Ahmad al-Ghashmi, and the head of Yemen’s Security Department, Mohammad al-Khamis, as well as Ali Abdullah Saleh, himself, who then served as commander of the Taiz Military Brigade, all of whom were present at the home of al-Ghashmi where al-Hamdi had been invited for lunch when he was assassinated. His assassination came two days before his scheduled visit to the South of Yemen to negotiate the unification of the North and South of Yemen at that time. His death cleared the ground for Ali Abdullah Saleh, who sought the immediate reversal of Hamdi's local development agenda.

Two French women were also assassinated. The bodies of Al-Hamdi and his brother were taken to the house of the dead French women and the four victims placed together to imply that the president and his brother were having an affair with the two French women.

When the Yemeni Revolution broke out, protesters gathered with the image of the late president, demanding justice and the investigation of the death of al-Hamdi.

Preceded by Abdul Rahman al-Iryani	President of North Yemen; 1974–1977	Succeeded by Ahmad al-Ghashmi
