= Arab Cold War =

Period of political rivalry in the Arab world

- Part of the Cold War and Middle Eastern proxy conflicts
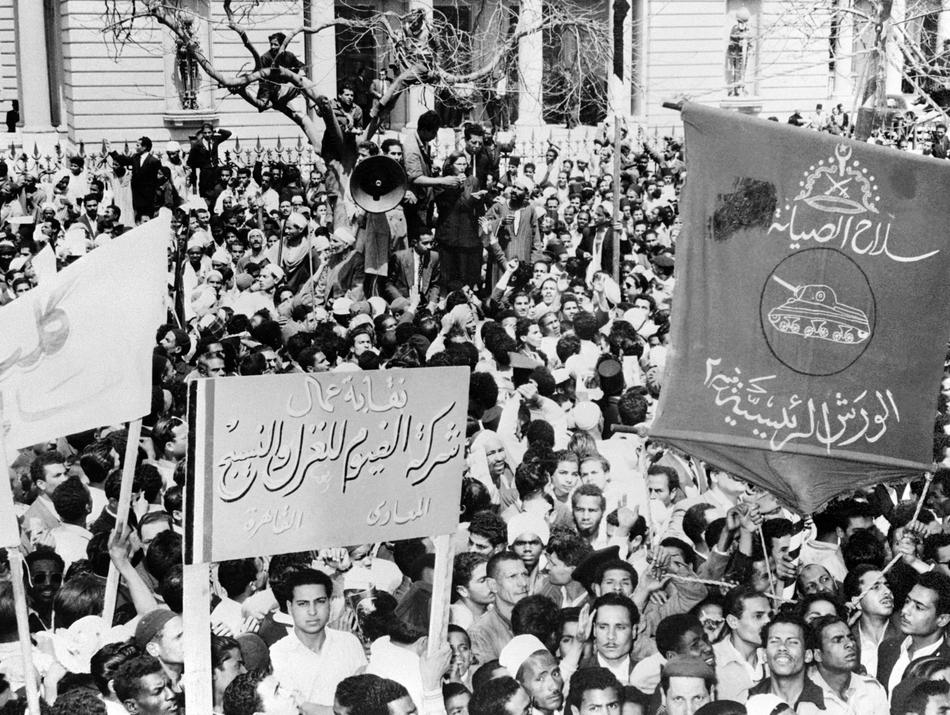
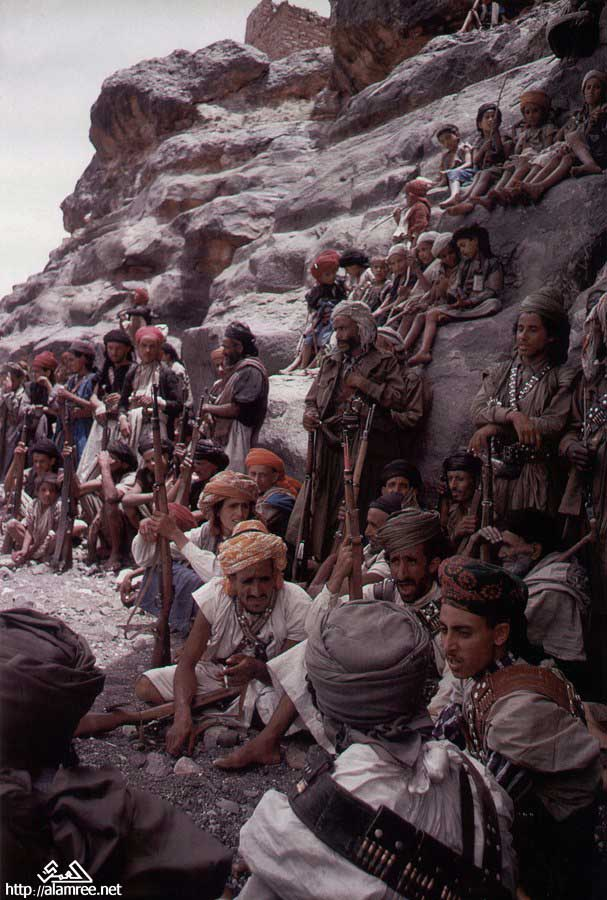
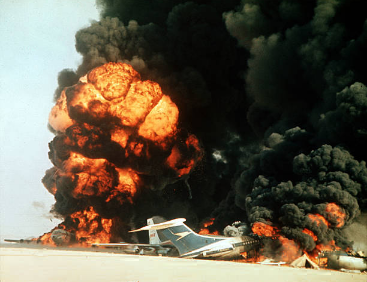
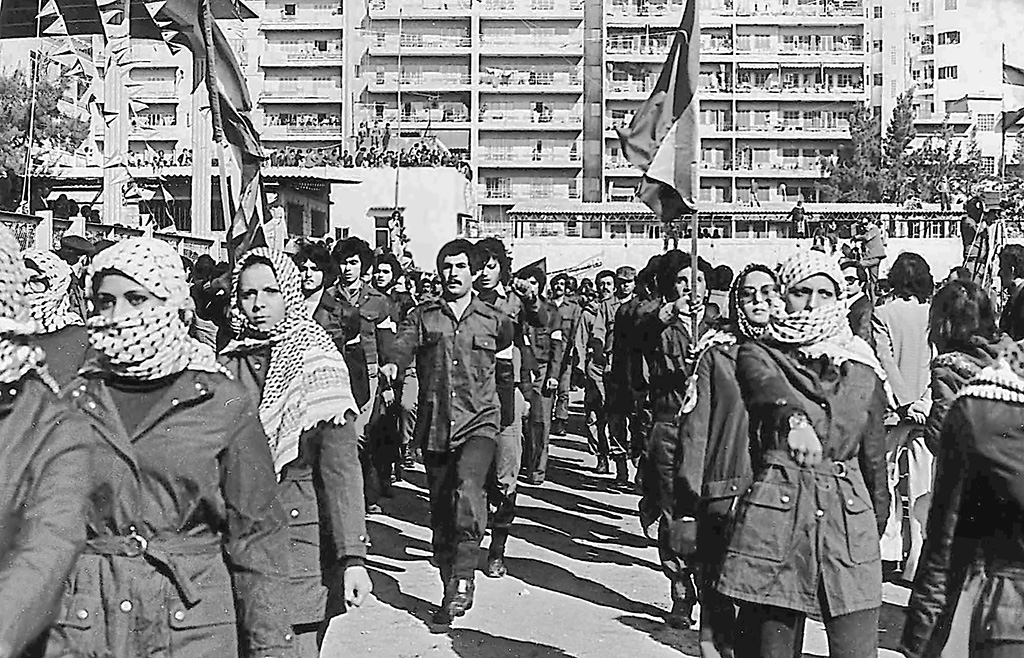
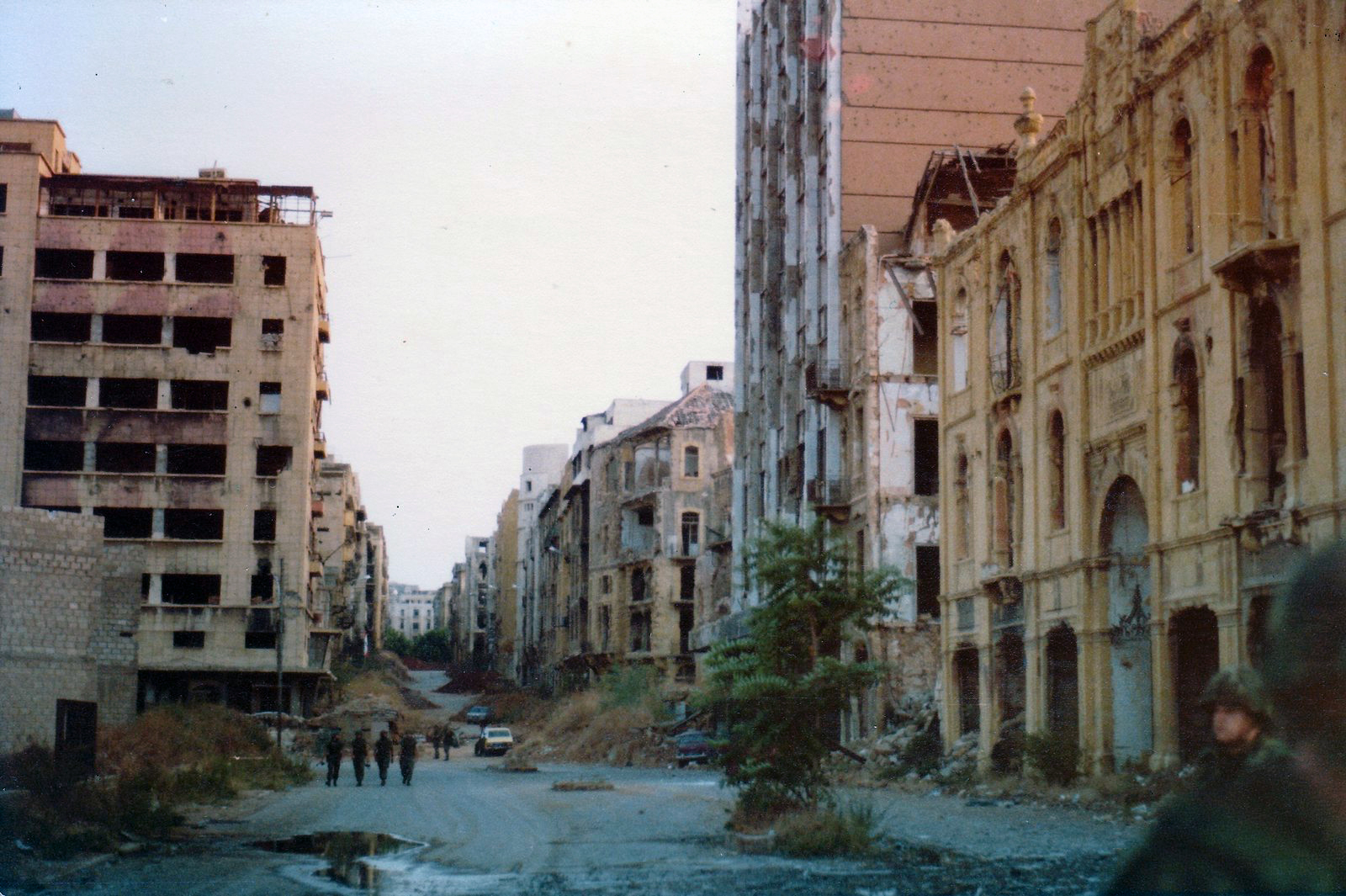
- From top to bottom, left to right: Demonstration supporting Egyptian leader Gamal Abdel Nasser, 1954; Tribal fighters for the Mutawakkilite Kingdom, North Yemen civil war, 1962; PFLP destruction of hijacked planes at Dawson's Field during Black September, 1970; Fatah members at a Beirut rally, Palestinian insurgency in South Lebanon, 1979; The Green Line of demarcation dividing Beirut during the Lebanese Civil War, 1982
Date	23 July 1952 – 6 September 1991 (Note: Some sources variously date the end of the period to c.1979 or 1990, particularly Yemeni unification, the end of the Lebanese Civil War, the Gulf War or the end of the Western Sahara War. Some sources say ongoing.)
Location	Arab world
Result	Decline of Pan-Arabism and Arab nationalism after the Six Day War and the death of Gamal Abdel Nasser; International propagation of Salafism and Wahhabism in several countries financed with Saudi oil exports; Creation of Gulf Cooperation Council; Failed attempts of an Arab Union: Arab Federation; United Arab Republic; United Arab States; Federation of Arab Republics; United Arab Kingdom; Union of Arab Republics; Arab Islamic Republic

Belligerents
Republic of Egypt (1953–1958); United Arab Republic (1958–1971); Arab Republic of Egypt (1971–1973); Iraqi Republic (1958–February 1963); Nasserist Iraq (November 1963-1968); Ba'athist Iraq (1968–1979, since 1990); Syrian Republic (1957-1958); Ba'athist Syria (from 1963); Libya (after 1969); Algeria; Sudan (1969–1971, since 1989); South Yemen; North Yemen (1962–1970, 1974–1978); Mauritania (until 1984); Somalia (1969–1977); Comoros (1975-1978); Djibouti (since 1981); Tunisia (1963-1976); Palestine (since 1988); Sahrawi Arab Democratic Republic (since 1976); Zanzibar (1964); Somaliland (1991); Provisional Government of the Algerian Republic (1958-1962); Liberated Areas (Oman); Palestine Liberation Organization; Abu Nidal Organization; Polisario Front; Arab Nationalist Movement; Ba'ath Party (until 1966); DLF(1963–1968); PFLOAG (1968–1974); NDFLOAG (1969–1971); PFLO (1974–1976); Hezbollah (from 1985); LNRF (1982-1990); LNM (before 1982); SPLA (1983-1989); FLN (1954-1962); SCIRI (before 1990); PUK (1979-1990); KDP (1979-1990); SSDF; SNM; (Somalia) USC; NDF; NLF (1963-1967); FLOSY (1963-1967); Federation of Arab Republics; Arab Islamic Republic United Arab States (1958–1961): United Arab Republic; Kingdom of Yemen	Saudi Arabia; Kingdom of Iraq (until 1958); Iraqi Republic (February 1963-November 1963); Ba'athist Iraq (1979–1990); Jordan; Lebanon; Morocco; Kingdom of Egypt (until 1953); Arab Republic of Egypt (since 1974); Syria (before 1957, 1961–1963); Libya (until 1969); Mauritania (from 1984); Federation of the Emirates of South Arabia / Federation of South Arabia (until 1967); Protectorate of South Arabia (until 1967); Kingdom of Yemen (until 1970); North Yemen (1970–1974, since 1978); Muscat and Oman (until 1970); Imamate of Oman (until 1959); Oman (since 1970); (Sultanate of Zanzibar) Zanzibar (until 1964); Bahrain; Kuwait; Qatar; Somalia (before 1969, from 1977); Comoros (1975, since 1978); Djibouti (1977-1981); Sudan (before 1969, 1971-1989); Trucial States (until 1971); United Arab Emirates (from 1971); Tunisia (since 1976); Right Wing of Fatah; Muslim Brotherhood; NFSL; Fighting Vanguard; PUK (before 1979, since 1990); KDP (before 1979, since 1990); Arab Federation (1958): Iraq; Jordan

Commanders and leaders
(Kingdom of Egypt) Mohamed Naguib #; (Kingdom of Egypt) (United Arab Republic) Gamal Abdel Nasser #; (United Arab Republic) Anwar Sadat (1970-1973); (Kingdom of Iraq) (First Republic of Iraq) Abd al-Karim Qasim (executed); (Iraq) Abdul Salam Arif ‽; (Iraq) Abdul Rahman Arif; (Ba'athist Iraq) Ahmed Hassan al-Bakr #; (Ba'athist Iraq) Saddam Hussein (since 1990); (Libya) (Libya) Muammar Gaddafi; (Palestine Liberation Organization) Yasser Arafat; (Syria) Shukri al-Quwatli; (Ba'athist Syria) Amin al-Hafiz; (Ba'athist Syria) Nureddin al-Atassi; (Ba'athist Syria) Salah Jadid; (Ba'athist Syria) (Ba'athist Syria) (Ba'athist Syria) Hafez al-Assad; (Algeria) Ahmed Ben Bella; (Algeria) Houari Boumédiène #; (Somali Democratic Republic) Siad Barre (1969–1977); (South Yemen) Qahtan Muhammad al-Shaabi #; (South Yemen) Abdul Fattah Ismail †; (South Yemen) Salim Rubaya Ali (executed); (South Yemen) Ali Nasir Muhammad; (South Yemen) Ali Salem al-Beidh; (Mauritania) Mokhtar Ould Daddah; (Sahrawi Arab Democratic Republic) El-Ouali Mustapha Sayed †; (Sahrawi Arab Democratic Republic) Brahim Ghali; (Comoros) Ali Soilih †; (Djibouti) Hassan Gouled Aptidon (since 1981); (Tunisia) Habib Bourguiba (1963-1976); (Sudan) (Sudan) Gaafar Nimeiry (1969-1971); (Sudan) Omar al-Bashir; (Kingdom of Yemen) Imam Ahmad bin Yahya (1958-1961); (Yemen Arab Republic) Abdullah al-Sallal; (Yemen Arab Republic) Abdul Rahman al-Eryani (1967-1970); (Yemen Arab Republic) Ibrahim al-Hamdi X; (People's Republic of Zanzibar) Abeid Karume; John Garang (1983-1989); Kamal Jumblatt X; Walid Jumblatt	(Saudi Arabia) King Faisal X; (Saudi Arabia) King Khalid #; (Saudi Arabia) King Fahd; (Jordan) King Hussein; (Palestine) Khaled Yashruti; (Kuwait) Emir Jaber; (Trucial States) (United Arab Emirates) Zayed bin Sultan Al Nahyan; (Oman) Sultan Qaboos; (Morocco) King Hassan II; (Bahrain) Emir Isa bin Salman; (Qatar) Emir Khalifa bin Hamad; (Kingdom of Egypt) King Farouk #; (Sultanate of Zanzibar) (Sultanate of Zanzibar) Sultan Jamshid bin Abdullah; Anwar Sadat X; Hosni Mubarak; (Kingdom of Iraq) King Faisal II (executed); (First Republic of Iraq) Ali Salih al-Sa'di; (Ba'athist Iraq) Saddam Hussein (1979–1990); (Tunisia) Habib Bourguiba (since 1976); (Tunisia) Zine El Abidine Ben Ali; (Kingdom of Libya) King Idris #; (Kingdom of Yemen) Imam Ahmad bin Yahya # (before 1958, 1961-1962); (Kingdom of Yemen) Imam Muhammad al-Badr; (Yemen Arab Republic) Abdul Rahman al-Eryani (1970-1974); (Yemen Arab Republic) Ali Abdullah Saleh; (Mauritania) Maaouya Ould Sid'Ahmed Taya; (Djibouti) Hassan Gouled Aptidon (1977-1981); (Sudan) Ismail al-Azhari; (Sudan) Gaafar Nimeiry (1971-1985); (Comoros) (Comoros) Ahmed Abdallah X: (Somali Democratic Republic) Siad Barre (from 1977)

The Arab Cold War (Arabic: الحرب العربية الباردة al-ḥarb al-`arabiyyah al-bāridah) was a political rivalry in the Arab world from the early 1950s to the late 1970s or early 1990s and a part of the wider Cold War. It is generally accepted that the beginning of the Arab Cold War is marked by the Egyptian Revolution of 1952, which led to Gamal Abdel Nasser becoming the president of Egypt in 1956. Thereafter, newly formed Arab republics, inspired by revolutionary secular nationalism and Nasser's Egypt, engaged in political rivalries with conservative traditionalist Arab monarchies, influenced by Saudi Arabia. The Iranian Revolution of 1979, and the ascension of Ayatollah Ruhollah Khomeini as leader of Iran, is widely seen as the end of this period of internal conflicts and rivalry. A new era of Arab-Iranian tensions followed, overshadowing the bitterness of intra-Arab strife.

Nasser espoused secular pan-Arab nationalism and socialism as a response to the perceived complicity of the Arab monarchies in Western interference in the Arab world. He also opposed the monarchies' support of rentierism and Islamism. Later Nasser embraced the Palestinian cause, albeit within the framework of pan-Arabism. After Egypt's political victory in the 1956 Suez Crisis, known in the Arab world as the Tripartite Aggression, Nasser and his associated ideology quickly gained support in other Arab countries, from Iraq in the east to French-occupied Algeria in the west. In several Arab countries, such as Iraq, North Yemen and Libya, conservative regimes were overthrown and replaced by new, ‘revolutionary’ republican governments. Meanwhile, Arab countries under Western countries’ rule, such as Algeria and South Yemen, experienced nationalist uprisings aimed at independence. At the same time, Syria, which was already strongly Arab nationalist, formed a short-lived federal union with Egypt called the United Arab Republic. Several other attempts were made to unite the Arab states in various configurations, but all attempts were unsuccessful.

Following their independence, the monarchies of Saudi Arabia, Jordan and Morocco, as well as the Gulf states, formed an alliance to directly or indirectly counter Egyptian influence. Saudi Arabia and Jordan, previously rivals over the competing claims of their respective dynasties, worked closely together to support the royalist faction in the North Yemen Civil War. The conflict became a proxy war between Egypt and Saudi Arabia following the establishment of the Nasserist Yemen Arab Republic in 1962.

The Arab Cold War was linked to the global confrontation between the United States and the Soviet Union, as the United States supported the conservative monarchies led by Saudi Arabia, while the Soviet Union supported the Egyptian-led republics, after Nasser's split with the United States and pivot to alignment with the Soviet Union. This was despite the republics' suppression of internal Arab communist movements. The Arab revolutionary nationalist republican movement supported anti-American, anti-Western, anti-imperialist, and anti-colonial revolutionary movements outside the Arab world, such as the Cuban Revolution. In contrast, the Arab monarchist movement supported conservative governments in predominantly Muslim countries such as Pakistan.

The earliest date marked as the end of the Arab Cold Wars is 1970. The success of the State of Israel in the Six-Day War of 1967 undermined the strategic strength of both Egypt and Nasser. The resolution of the North Yemen Civil War, although brokered by Nasser and King Faisal of Saudi Arabia, was a victory for the Egyptian-backed Yemeni Republicans. The intense Egyptian-Saudi rivalry faded dramatically as attention focused on Egypt's efforts to liberate its own territory under Israeli occupation.

After Nasser's death in 1970, Anwar Sadat became president and departed significantly from Nasser's revolutionary platform, both domestically and in regional and international affairs. In particular, Sadat sought to establish a close strategic partnership with Saudi Arabia under King Faisal, which was crucial to Egypt's success in the first part of the Yom Kippur War of 1973. Building on these early successes, Sadat completely distanced himself from Nasserism by ending Egypt's strategic alliance with the Soviet Union and aligning himself instead with the United States. In 1978, he negotiated a peace treaty with the state of Israel that required the removal of all Israeli military personnel and settlers from Egyptian land. Sadat's peace treaty not only alienated Nasserists and other secular Arab nationalists, but also enraged Islamists, who denounced him as an apostate. This eventually led to his assassination by the Egyptian Islamic Jihad in 1981. Egypt was suspended from the Arab League, leading to its virtual isolation in the region. Meanwhile, Islamism grew in popularity, culminating in the 1979 Iranian Revolution. This established Shi'a Iran as a regional power committed to overthrowing the predominantly Sunni governments of Arab states, both republican and monarchical. After the outbreak of the Iran–Iraq War in the early 1980s, Egypt, still suspended from the Arab League, joined Saudi Arabia in supporting Sunni-led Iraq against Shi'ite Iran. At the same time, the Sunni–Shi'a conflict in other parts of the region, such as Lebanon, became a new proxy conflict between the regional powers of the two Muslim sects.

== Terminology ==
The term "Arab Cold War" was first used by Malcolm H. Kerr, an American political scientist and Middle East scholar, in his 1965 book of the same name and subsequent editions.

== Background ==
In 1956, only Egypt, Syria, Lebanon, Tunisia, and Sudan were republics. All of these Arab states subscribed to some degree to Arab nationalist ideology. Jordan and Iraq were both ruled by Hashemite monarchies. Morocco, Libya, Saudi Arabia and North Yemen had independent dynasties. Algeria, South Yemen, Oman and the Trucial States were either under French colonial rule or British occupation. In 1960, Iraq, Tunisia, Algeria and North Yemen had republican governments or Arab nationalist insurgencies. Meanwhile, Lebanon was experiencing a near-civil war between US-allied government factions and Soviet- and Egyptian-allied Arab nationalist factions.

The dates of the conflicts in this period vary from source to source. Jordanian sources date the beginning of the Arab Cold War to April 1957, while Palestinian sources identify the period from 1962 to 1967 as the most significant for them within a wider Arab context.

== History ==
The Free Officers Movement overthrew King Farouk during the Egyptian Revolution of 1952. Led by Mohamed Naguib and Gamal Abdel Nasser, the Free Officers implemented a program to transform Egypt by reducing feudalism, ending British influence and abolishing the monarchy and aristocracy. In 1953 they established Egypt as a republic.

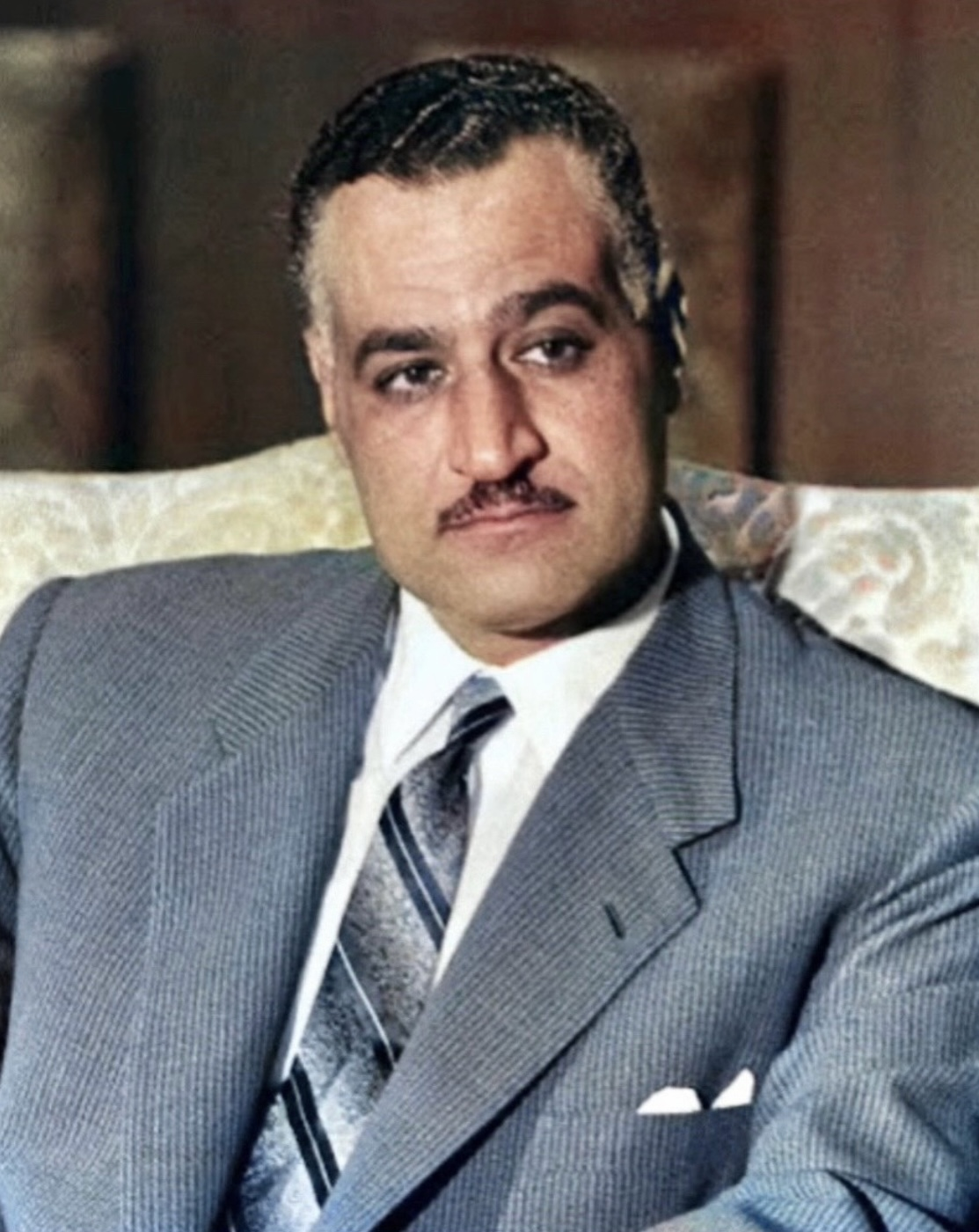
Gamal Abdel Nasser

On 26 July 1956, Nasser nationalized the Suez Canal after Britain and the United States withdrew their offer to finance the construction of the Aswan Dam in response to Egypt's new relationship with the Soviet Union. Britain and France then made a pact with Israel to invade Egypt together, but were forced to back down in what became known as the Suez Crisis. Nasser emerged from the crisis with great prestige as the "unchallenged leader of Arab nationalism".

Nasser used various political tools to increase his visibility in the Arab world. These included radio programs such as Voice of the Arabs and the use of politically active Egyptian professionals, often teachers.

Egyptian teachers seconded to Arab states by destination, (1953–1962)
	1953	1954	1955	1956	1957	1958	1959	1960	1961
Saudi Arabia	206	293	401	500	454	551	727	866	1027
Jordan	-	8	20	31	56	-	-	-	-
Lebanon	25	25	39	36	75	111	251	131	104
Kuwait	114	180	262	326	395	435	490	480	411
Bahrain	15	15	18	25	25	25	26	28	36
Morocco	-	-	-	20	75	81	175	210	334
Sudan	-	-	-	-	580	632	673	658	653
Qatar	-	1	3	5	8	14	17	18	24
Libya	55	114	180	219	217	232	228	391	231
Yemen	-	12	11	8	17	17	17	14	0
Iraq	76	112	121	136	63	449	-	-	-
Palestine	13	32	34	37	46	120	166	175	165
Somalia	-	-	25	23	57	69	90	109	213

In July 1958, the Hashemite Kingdom of Iraq was overthrown with the monarchy removed and replaced by an Arab nationalist republic. As a result, the king, crown prince, prime minister and most of the royal family was killed by the nationalist revolutionaries. At the time, the forces supportive to Nasser and nationalism seemed to be gaining strength, while the older Arab monarchies seemed to be in danger. In 1969, the Kingdom of Libya under King Idris was overthrown by the Free Officers Movement of Libya, a group of rebel military officers led by Colonel Muammar Gaddafi.

In Saudi Arabia, some Saudi princes (led by Prince Talal bin Abdul Aziz) supported Nasser's cause of Arab socialism because of his popularity. In 1962 a Saudi air force pilot defected to Cairo. In 1965 and 1966 there were signs of unrest and subversion, particularly in Saudi Arabia's oil-producing region. In 1969, the Saudi government uncovered a Nasserist plot involving 28 army officers, 34 air force officers, nine other military personnel and 27 civilians.

In the early 1960s, Nasser sent an expeditionary army to Yemen to support the anti-monarchist forces in the North Yemen Civil War. The Yemeni royalists were supported by the monarchies of Saudi Arabia and Jordan. In December 1962, the Egyptian air force attacked Saudi border towns such as Najran.

By the end of the 1960s, Nasser's prestige had declined due to the political failure of the union between Egypt and Syria, military setbacks in Yemen, where the civil war reached a stalemate despite his commitment of thousands of troops to overthrow the monarchists, and especially against Israel, where Egypt lost the Sinai Peninsula and suffered the loss of 10,000 to 15,000 troops in the Six-Day War. In late 1967, Egyptian President Nasser and Saudi Foreign Minister Prince Faisal signed a treaty. According to the treaty, Nasser would withdraw the 20,000 Egyptian troops from Yemen, Faisal would stop sending arms to the Yemeni royalists, and three neutral Arab states would send observers.

=== Islamic revival ===
Although the Kingdom of Saudi Arabia had a smaller population than Egypt, it had oil wealth and prestige due to the cities of Mecca and Medina, Islam's two holiest cities. In 1962, Saudi Arabia sponsored an international Islamic conference in Mecca to use Islam as a counterweight to Nasser's Arab socialism. This led to the creation of the Muslim World League, dedicated to spreading Islam and promoting Islamic solidarity. The League was effective in promoting conservative Wahhabi Islam and combating radical foreign ideologies, such as Arab socialism, in the Muslim world.

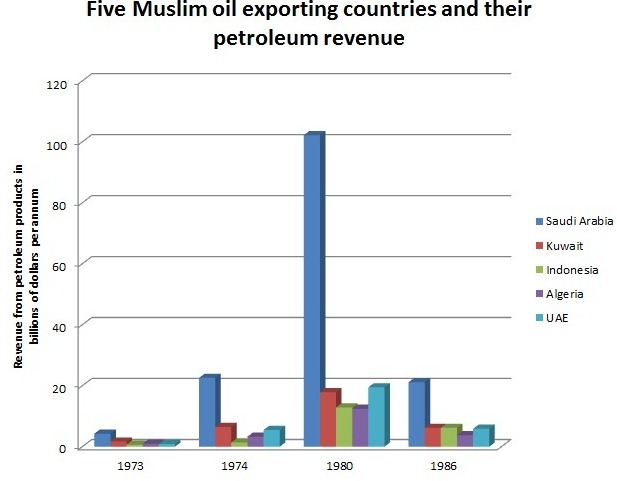
Petroleum products revenue in billions of dollars per annum for five major Arab petroleum exporting countries. Saudi Arabian production Years were chosen to show payment for before (1973) and after (1974) the October 1973 War, after the Iranian Revolution (1978–1979), and during the market turnaround in 1986. Iran and Iraq are excluded because their revenue fluctuated due to the revolution and the war between them.

The Islamic revival strengthened throughout the Arab world, especially after the Six-day War. After Nasser's death in 1970, his successor Anwar Sadat shifted the focus to religion and economic liberalization, away from Arab nationalism and socialism. Egypt's military slogan "Land, Sea and Air" was replaced by the Islamic phrase "Allahu Akbar" (meaning God is great), in the perceived "shattering" defeat in the Yom Kippur War. Although the October 1973 war was launched by Egypt and Syria to recover land captured by Israel in 1967, according to French political scientist Gilles Kepel, the "real victors" of the war were the Arab "oil-exporting countries". Their embargo on Israel's Western allies helped the US to pressure Israel to limit its counter-offensive. The political success of the embargo enhanced the prestige of those who imposed it. In addition, the reduction in global oil supply caused the price of oil to rise from US$3 to almost $12 a barrel, increasing the revenues of oil exporters. This gave the Arab oil-exporting states a dominant position within the Muslim world, with Saudi Arabia by far the largest exporter (see bar chart above).

In Egypt, the Muslim Brotherhood, which was supported by Saudi Arabia and had been suppressed by the Egyptian government, was allowed to publish a monthly magazine and its political prisoners were gradually released. Islamists gained control of the universities, forcing left-wing and pan-Arab (anti-Sadat) student organizations underground. By the end of the 1970s, Sadat described himself as 'The Believer President'. He banned most alcohol sales and ordered Egyptian state television to interrupt programs in order to broadcast the salat (Islamic call to prayer) five times a day and to increase religious programming.

=== US involvement ===
The U.S. State Department recognized Saudi Arabia as "a stupendous source of strategic power, and one of the greatest material prizes in world history." U.S. President Franklin Roosevelt declared “the defense of Saudi Arabia is vital to the defense of the United States." According to historian Victor McFarland, the Eisenhower administration feared Nasser’s Arab nationalism would spark uprisings against conservative regimes in the Middle East and jeopardize Western oil access. Nasser's nationalization of the Suez Canal and his call to use oil against Israel and the West sparked concerns over future oil nationalization. Intervening militarily to support Lebanon’s conservative regime, Eisenhower told Nixon that Nasser threatened “vitally needed petroleum supplies” and, by controlling the region's oil, would hold “the income and the power to destroy the Western world.”

According to a State Department Memorandum of a Conference, President Dwight D. Eisenhower believed that "we should work toward building up King Saud as a major figure in the Middle Eastern area." John Foster Dulles, U.S. secretary of state under President Dwight D. Eisenhower, viewed King Saud of Saudi Arabia as "the only figure in the area with sufficient presence and potential assets to serve as a counterpoise to Nasser." An internal U.S. State Department memo reporting a meeting between President Dwight D. Eisenhower with US Secretary of State John F. Dulles and the Joint Chiefs of Staff in 1957 stated the following:

The President said he thought we should do everything possible to stress the "holy war" aspect. Mr. Dulles commented that if the Arabs have a "holy war" they would want it to be against Israel. The President recalled, however, that Saud, after his visit here, had called on all Arabs to oppose Communism.

According to Rashid Khalidi, as Arab nationalists surged during the Arab Cold War, the U.S. and its client conservative monarchies appeared to be losing ground. Saudi Arabia countered this shift by leveraging Wahhabi Islam as a decisive counter-force. According to Mohammed bin Salman, the de facto ruler of Saudi Arabia, the Saudi International propagation of the Salafi movement and Wahhabism campaign was "rooted in the cold war, when allies asked Saudi Arabia to use its resources to prevent inroads in Muslim countries by the Soviet Union." According to some estimates, since the 1960s, the Saudis have funnelled over US$100 billion into funding schools and mosques all over the world with the mission of spreading puritanical Wahhabi Islam. According to political scientist Alex Alexiev, the impetus for the international propagation of Salafism and Wahhabism was "the largest worldwide propaganda campaign ever mounted", David A. Kaplan described it as "dwarfing the Soviets' propaganda efforts at the height of the Cold War". In 2013, the European Parliament identified Wahhabism as the main source of global terrorism. Despite the intense U.S. Cold War rhetoric regarding the spread of "international communism" in the Middle East, according to Rashid Khalidi, the socialist Arab nationalist leaders— except in South Yemen—"were deeply, fundamentally anticommunist, and none were committedly anticapitalist." Mark Curtis argues that:

In the earlier postwar period, the major threat of nationalism was countered by a mix of economic policies, covert action to remove wayward governments and outright military intervention. The constant pretext was the Soviet threat. The chief proponents of the nationalist threat were 'radical' governments (that is, those independent of the West) and liberation movements. In the era of globalisation, independent forces are being countered primarily by economic instruments like the WTO and by military/political strategies like the 'war on terrorism'. The latter is aimed at bolstering friendly regimes (under the guise of anti terrorism) and provides a cover for a new phase of global intervention to remove unwanted governments.

== Conflicts of the Arab Cold War ==
=== 1950s ===
- Egyptian revolution (1952)
- Iraqi Intifada (1952)
- Syrian coup d'état (1954)
- Jebel Akhdar War (1954–1959)
- Algerian revolution (1954–1962)
- Alleged Jordanian military coup attempt (1957)
- Syrian Crisis (1957)
- 14 July Revolution (1958)
- Lebanon crisis (1958)
- Mosul uprising (1959)

=== 1960s ===
- Operation Vantage (1961)
- 1961 revolt in Somalia
- Bizerte crisis (1961)
- Syrian coup d'état (1961)
- North Yemen Civil War (1962–1970)
  - North Yemen coup d'état (1967)
- Ramadan Revolution (1963)
- Syrian coup d'état (1963)
- July 1963 Syrian coup attempt
- Dhofar Rebellion (1963–1976)
- Sand War (1963)
- Socialist Forces Front rebellion in Algeria
- Aden Emergency (1963–1967)
- Syrian coup d'état (1966)
- Six-Day War (1967)
- Palestinian insurgency in South Lebanon (1968–1982)
- Corrective Move (1969)
- Sudanese coup d'état (1969)
- 1969 Somali coup d'état
- Libyan coup d'état (1969)
- Al-Wadiah War (1969)

=== 1970s ===
- Black September (1970–1971)
- Syrian invasion of Jordan (1970)
- Corrective Movement (1970)
- 1970 Zeila uprising
- Sudanese coup d'état (1971)
- Yemeni War (1972)
- Yom Kippur War (1973)
- North Yemeni coup d'état (1974)
- Lebanese Civil War (1975–1990)
- Sudanese coup attempt (1975)
- Western Sahara War (1975–1991)
- Islamist uprising in Syria (1976–1982)
- Sudanese coup attempt (1976)
- Egyptian–Libyan War (1977)
- Ethiopian–Somali War (1977–1978)
- NDF Rebellion (1978–1982)
- Yemeni War (1979)
- Khuzestan insurgency (1979)
- Afraad Rebellion
- Somali Rebellion

=== 1980s ===
- Ba'ath Party intraconflict
- Iran–Iraq War (1980–1988)
- Ethiopian–Somali Border War (1982)
- Sudanese coup d'état (1985)
- South Yemen Civil War (1986)
- Damascus bombings (1986)
- Somaliland War of Independence

== See also ==
- Arab Spring
- Arab Winter
- Cold War in Asia
- Gulf War
- Iran–Saudi Arabia proxy conflict
- Iran–Iraq War
- Iran–Israel proxy conflict
- Middle Eastern Cold War (disambiguation)
- Soviet–Afghan War
- Cold War
- Qatar–Saudi Arabia diplomatic conflict
