= Deaths in July 1981 =

The following is a list of notable deaths in July 1981.

Entries for each day are listed alphabetically by surname. A typical entry lists information in the following sequence:

- Name, age, country of citizenship at birth, subsequent country of citizenship (if applicable), reason for notability, cause of death (if known), and reference.

== July 1981 ==
=== 1 ===
- Marcel Breuer, 79, Hungarian-American modernist architect and furniture designer, he is regarded as one of the great innovators of modern furniture design and one of the most-influential exponents of the International Style.
- Rushton Moreve, 32, American bass guitarist, member of the rock band Steppenwolf from 1967 to 1968, and again in 1978, fatally injured in a car accident

=== 2 ===
- Mercedes Prendes, 78, Spanish actress, starting in the early 1960s, she was involved in a wide range of television dramas produced by the government-controlled company Televisión Española, notably on the drama channels Estudio 1 and Novela.

=== 3 ===
- Ross Martin, 61, Polish-born American actor, he portrayed the Secret Service agent Artemus Gordon in the science fiction television series The Wild Wild West, the famed Asian detective Charlie Chan in The Return of Charlie Chan (1973), and the Chinook oceanographer Dr. Paul Williams in Sealab 2020,fatal heart attack after a game of tennis

=== 4 ===
- Stephen Bosustow, 69, Canadian-born American film producer, animator, and screenwriter, he was one of the staff members who left Walt Disney Productions during the 1941 Disney animators' strike,; after briefly working as an illustrator for Hughes Aircraft, Bosustov co-founded the new animation studio United Productions of America (UPA).
- Isao Kimura, 58, Japanese actor, his notable film appearances include Akira Kurosawa's Stray Dog (1949), Seven Samurai (1954), and Ikiru (1952), cancer

=== 7 ===
- Qahtan al-Shaabi, 61, Yemeni politician, he served as the first President of South Yemen from 1967 until 1969, Al-Shaabi led a right-wing Nasserist faction within the National Liberation Front, and he was deposed by the political party's Marxist hardliners in the political shift known as the Corrective Move, he spend part of the 1970s in house arrest and then lived in retirement in Aden until his death

=== 8 ===
- Jugah Barieng, 78, Malaysian politician, he was the Paramount Chief of the Iban people for more than 55 years.
- Joe McDonnell, 29, Irish paramilitary member, volunteer in the Provisional Irish Republican Army (IRA) and the Provisional IRA Belfast Brigade, he was arrested during a shootout between the IRA and forces of the Royal Ulster Constabulary and the British Army, he died while taking part in the 1981 Irish hunger strike, he had starved himself to death for 61 days
- Loring Smith, 90, American actor and vaudevillian, he started his entertainment career by performing for his fellow soldiers in the Tank Corps during World War I, he was part of the regular cast of the sitcom The Hartmans (1949)

=== 9 ===
- Ruth Brooks Flippen, 59, American screenwriter and television writer, she served as a story editor and script consultant for the sitcom Bewitched, a story editor for the sitcom The Brady Bunch, and briefly the head writer of the soap opera Days of Our Lives in 1980, death from an unspecified heart disease
- Meyer Levin, 75 American novelist, documentary filmmaker, journalist, and magazine editor, he wrote and directed the documentary The Illegals for the Office Of War Information, depicting the smuggling of Jews out of Poland, he served as a war correspondent in Europe during World War II, representing the Overseas News Agency and the Jewish Telegraphic Agency, he wrote a theatrical adaptation of The Diary of Anne Frank, and he sued the writers of another adaptation of the same diary for plagiarism.

=== 10 ===
- Giorgio De Lullo, 60, Italian actor and stage director, he co-founded the theatrical company La compagnia dei giovani in 1954, cirrhosis

=== 13 ===
- Francis Cugat, 88, Spanish painter and graphic designer, he designed sets for the Douglas Fairbanks motion pictures Don Q, Son of Zorro (1925) and The Gaucho (1927), he was credited for technical work on 68 Hollywood films.
- Martin Hurson, 24, Irish Republican, he was a Volunteer in the East Tyrone Brigade of the Provisional Irish Republican Army (IRA), he was the sixth convict to die during the 1981 Irish Hunger Strike.

=== 15 ===
- Federico De Laurentiis, 26, Italian film producer, he was the executive producer of the monster film King Kong (1976), he was given full reign to produce the films King of the Gypsies (1978) and She Dances Alone (1981), killed in an aviation accident, when his Cessna 185 Skywagon collided with a Cessna 206 in mid-air

=== 16 ===
- Harry Chapin, 38, American singer-songwriter, documentary filmmaker, philanthropist, and hunger activist, he directed the boxing documentary film Legendary Champions (1968), which was nominated for the Academy Award for Best Documentary Feature Film, cardiac arrest and internal bleeding, shortly after being injured in a car accident. His vehicle was struck from behind by a semi-trailer truck.
- Neda Spasojević, 40, Serbian actress, she appeared in more than 60 films from 1964 until her death in 1981, rejected at the Performing Arts Academy in Belgrade, Spasojević took her father's advice to move to Titograd, SR Montenegro if she wished to pursue a career in acting, cancer

=== 20 ===
- Dale Hennesy, 54, American production designer, art director, and illustrator, he provided illustration work for the film adaptations of The King and I (1956) and South Pacific (1958), he won the Academy Award for Best Production Design for Fantastic Voyage (1966), for which he created sets depicting the interior of the human body, abdominal aneurysm while working on the production of Annie (1982)

=== 21 ===
- Max Liebman, 78, Austrian-born American director, producer and writer for vaudeville, Broadway theater and television shows, he served as a theater director at the Pocono Mountains resort Tamiment for 15 years, Liebman's shows at the resort combined music and dance with comedy, and the people Liebman hired included Danny Kaye, Sylvia Fine, Imogene Coca, Betty Garrett, Jules Munshin, Herbert Ross, and Jerome Robbins, he was the main director and producer for the variety show Your Show of Shows (1950-1954) which is historically significant for the evolution of the variety genre by incorporating situation comedies (sitcoms) such as the running sketch The Hickenloopers; this added a narrative element to the traditional multi-act structure.

=== 27 ===
- Adam Walsh, 6, American victim of child abduction and child murder, he exited a Sears store in the company of older boys and was left alone when the group dispersed, death by asphyxiation. Walsh's severed head was discovered in early August,and he was identified as one of the victims of the serial killer Ottis Toole in 2008.
- William Wyler, 79, German-born American film director and producer, he has the distinction of having directed more actors to Oscar-nominated performances than any other director in film history: thirty-six,; out of these nominees, fourteen went on to win Oscars, which is also a record, he received the fourth AFI Life Achievement Award in 1976, heart attack

=== 28 ===
- Stanley Rother, 46, American Catholic priest, he served as a missionary to the Tz'utujil people of Santiago Atitlán from 1968 until his death in 1981, he learned the Tz’utujil language and supported a radio station which transmitted daily lessons in language and mathematics, assassinated in his own rectory, shot twice in the head.Prior to his death, the director of Rother's radio station had been murdered, and some of Rother's catechists and parishioners had been subjected to enforced disappearances, murders, beatings, and torture.

=== 29 ===
- Sydney Kyte, 85, British dance band leader and violinist, he led the resident band at The Piccadilly Hotel in London's West End during the 1930s.
- Robert Moses, 92, American urban planner and public official, he was a highly influential figure in the initiation of many of the reforms that restructured the New York state government during the 1920s, a 'Reconstruction Commission' headed by Moses produced a highly influential report that provided recommendations that would largely be adopted, including the consolidation of 187 existing agencies under 18 departments, a new executive budget system, and the four-year term limit for the governorship,his critics charge that Moses preferred automobiles over people, they point out that Moses displaced hundreds of thousands of residents in New York City and destroyed traditional neighborhoods by building multiple expressways through them, Moses' projects contributed to the ruin of the South Bronx and the amusement parks of Coney Island, caused the Brooklyn Dodgers and the New York Giants Major League Baseball teams to relocate to Los Angeles and San Francisco respectively, and precipitated the decline of public transport from disinvestment and neglect, Moses defended his forced displacement of poor and minority communities as an inevitable part of urban revitalization, heart disease

=== 31 ===
- Omar Torrijos, 52, Panamanian military officer and politician, he served as the military dictator of Panama from 1968 until his death in 1981, he assumed power following the 1968 Panamanian coup d'état, though he was not among its initial leaders, Torrijos negotiated the Torrijos–Carter Treaties (1977) over the Panama Canal, which passed the sovereignty over the canal zone from the United States to Panama, with a gradual increase in Panamanian control, killed in an aviation accident, he was one of the victims of the 1981 Panamanian Air Force Twin Otter crash. His dead body was recovered in early August.

== Sources ==
- Brehony, Noel (February 21, 2013). Yemen Divided: The Story of a Failed State in South Arabia. Bloomsbury Academic. ISBN 978-1-78076-491-7.
- Caro, Robert (1974). The Power Broker: Robert Moses and the Fall of New York. New York: Knopf. ISBN 978-0-394-48076-3.
- Caro, Robert A. (July 22, 1974). "The Power Broker—I: How Robert Moses Transformed New York". The New Yorker. pp. 32–64. Archived from the original on January 14, 2025.
- Halliday, Fred (October 4, 2013). Arabia Without Sultans. Saqi. ISBN 978-0-86356-714-8.
- Priestley, George. Military Government and Popular Participation in Panama: The Torrijos Regime, 1968-1975. (1986)
- Sweet, Jeffrey (November 2008). "The Tamiment Connection". American Theatre. 25 (9): 74–79.
- Walsh, John; Schindehette, Susan (1998). Tears of Rage: From Grieving Father to Crusader for Justice: The Untold Story of the Adam Walsh Case (Paperback ed.). Thorndike Press. ISBN 0786213124.
