= Corrective Move =

1969 Marxist internal coup in South Yemen

- Part of the Arab Cold War
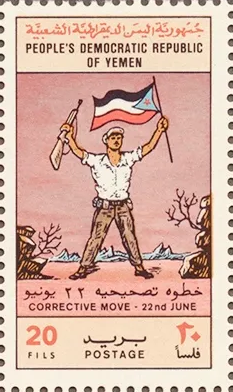
- 20 Fils postage stamp commemorating the Corrective Move
Date	22 June 1969
Location	Aden, South Yemen
Result	Communist faction victory: Qahtan al-Shaabi placed under house arrest until his death in 1981; Nasserite faction purged from the National Front; South Yemen became a communist state.; State name changed to "People's Democratic Republic of Yemen" in 1970

Factions
Communist faction of the National Front	Nasserite faction of the National Front

Commanders and leaders
Abdul Fattah Ismail; Salim Rubaya Ali; Muhammad Ali Haitham; Muhammad Saleh al-Aulaqi; Ali Antar	Qahtan al-Shaabi; Faysal al-Shaabi

The Corrective Move (Note: Arabic: الخطوة التصحيحية, romanized: al-khutwah at-taṣḥīḥiyyah, lit. 'The Corrective Step') (Note: Also known as the 22 June Corrective Move, or the Glorious Corrective Move.) was a political shift that took place in South Yemen on 22 June 1969, resulting in the overthrow and purge of the ruling right-wing faction of the National Front (NF) by the party's left-wing faction. The change in leadership was followed by the adoption of a series of socialist policies and reforms, and marked South Yemen's transition into a communist state.

The shift occurred following internal disagreements among various NF factions, leading the party to convene its 4th Congress in an attempt to resolve the disputes. The congress adopted several pro-left-wing measures. The right-wing faction, dissatisfied with the outcomes, initially attempted to sideline the left through purges. When that effort failed, the left attempted a counter-purge, which was also unsuccessful. The eventual transfer of power came amid the growing unpopularity of then-president Qahtan al-Shaabi, who was also the informal leader of the right-wing faction. Leadership was assumed by Abdul Fattah Ismail and Salim Rubaya Ali, who removed Qahtan, along with Prime Minister Faysal al-Shaabi and his cabinet.

Social and political reforms followed the leftist takeover; the state was transformed into a Communist state, institutions were nationalised, schools and universities were built, education became freely accessible to everyone, and a new Family Law was enacted, ensuring equality between men and women.

== Background ==
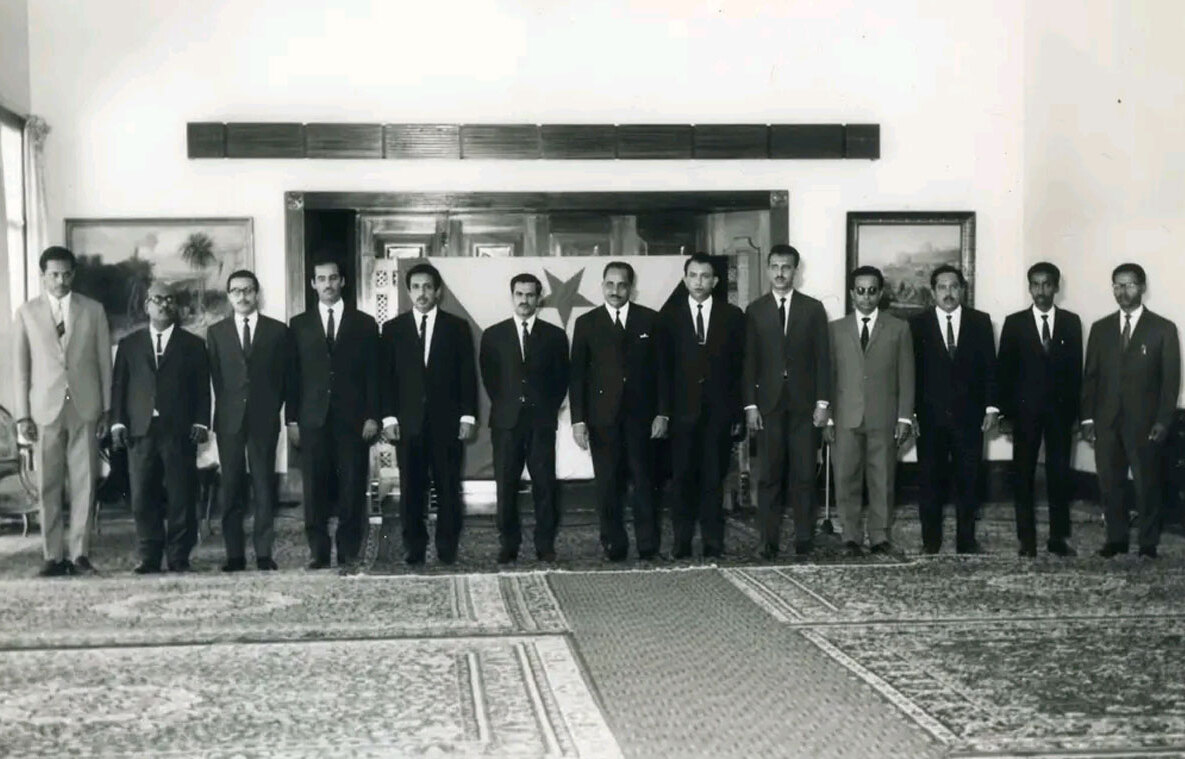
South Yemen's first cabinet, announced on 1 December 1967

Following South Yemen's independence from the British on 30 November 1967 after 128 years of colonial rule, the National Front (NF) was split into two factions; The Aden-based ruling right-wing faction, which supported a capitalist system, faced off against the Hadhramaut-based socialist left-wing faction. The left-wing faction drew inspiration from Vladimir Lenin's book, The State and Revolution, which emphasised the need for a revolution to dismantle existing structures and establish popular state institutions.

Economically, the withdrawal of the British left more than 20,000 Yemenis unemployed, and 100,000 educated people linked to the colonial state had left alongside the British. The closure of the Suez Canal deprived the capital city of Aden of 75% of its shipping and trade income; the income per capita was £40. Furthermore, the British failure to fulfill their aid commitments led to the state losing 60 per cent of its revenue. The lack of experience of the new leaders worsened the economic decline and led to significant administrative disorganisation.

On 1 December 1967, Qahtan al-Shaabi was appointed as president for a two-year term. After taking the post, he appointed himself as prime minister and Supreme Commander of the Armed Forces, and announced the state's first cabinet, with his cousin, Faysal al-Shaabi, as Secretary-General of the NF. On 11 December 1967, the sultans, traditional elites, and individuals linked to British rule were stripped of their positions and had their property seized.

On 30 January 1968, Abdullah al-Khamri, a member of the general board of directors of the National Front's newspaper, al-Thawri, published an article titled "Are the Revolutionaries or the Opportunists in Power?" In it, he questioned the leadership's commitment to revolutionary ideals, suggesting that they might be motivated by opportunism and a desire to climb to the seats of power rather than pursue genuine revolutionary goals. The other members of the board, Faysal al-Shaabi and Abdul Fattah Ismail, did not review the published article, and both of them condemned it. The incident created a feeling of distrust among members of the NF, leading to more internal divisions.

=== Fourth General Congress of the National Front ===
The disagreements between the factions were planned to be resolved at the upcoming Fourth General Congress of the National Front. The General Committee of the National Front announced a Preparatory Committee headed by Faysal al-Shaabi, Abdul Fattah Ismail, Ali Saleh Abad, and Abdullah al-Khamri. They were tasked with preparing the congress. The committee never fulfilled its work, and Ali Nasir described the preparations for the congress as "Arabic: عشوائية, lit. 'chaotic'". During the preparation period, Abdul Fattah Ismail announced that he would leave Yemen for Cairo, citing health issues. Ismail's announcement effectively disbanded the preparatory committee. A new informal committee, chaired by Nayef Hawatmeh, was formed to prepare the congress, without consulting the party leadership. The congress was held 2–8 March 1968, in the city of Zinjibar of the Third Governorate, and was attended by 167 delegates. Soldiers from the Armed Forces, who were not members of the NF, attended the congress, despite protests from the left-wing faction. According to Ali Nasir, the congress was held in a general atmosphere of toxicity.

The left-wing position was most clearly outlined in Abdul Fattah Ismail's programmatic speech, titled "The Noncapitalist Path of Development". In this speech, Ismail argued that South Yemen's future could either be shaped by the "petty bourgeoisie" or the "revolutionary forces"; the workers, poor peasants, and "partisans". He criticised the bourgeoisie for its inability to combat imperialism and promote the necessary economic and social changes, such as agrarian reform and industrialisation. He cited historical failures of petty-bourgeois leadership, such as during the European revolutions of 1848 and 1870, and attributed the collapse of the Second International in 1914 to the same cause. He also criticised the overthrown regimes of Kwame Nkrumah and Sukarno for being dominated by petty-bourgeois elements, which he viewed as a key factor in their downfall. Additionally, Ismail denounced the governments of Egypt, Algeria, Syria, and Iraq, arguing that the petty-bourgeois leadership in these countries was more harmful to national revolutions than open counter-revolutionary forces. He specifically accused the Egyptian government of masking its dictatorship as "socialism." Ismail presented the "Programme of National Democratic Popular Liberation", which called for the continuation of a national democratic revolution. The programme advocated for nationalisation of foreign banks and foreign trade, as well as putting an end to Aden's free port status except for in tourism and the transit of goods, in order to consolidate the revolution's gains. The goal was to ensure that South Yemen did not devolve into a neo-colonial state, but became a truly independent national state.

The left proposed transforming the state into a people's democratic state, adopting scientific socialism and anti-capitalism as the NF's main ideology, the establishment of a 100,000 to 150,000-personnel People's Militia, and the restriction of party membership for workers, peasants, soldiers, and revolutionary intellectuals. It also proposed establishing a supreme state organ of power in the form of a Supreme People's Council and establishing a nationwide network of lower-level state organs of power, which they called popular councils. These proposals resonated well with most congress delegates. In tandem with these policy changes, the congress delegates went on to elect a 41-member strong General Command, the highest leadership organ of the front, in which the left-wingers had a majority. At the congress, the left secured majority support for resolutions aimed at launching a new phase of "popular democratic liberation" in South Yemen. These resolutions called for collective decision-making at all levels; a purge of the civil service, army, and police to remove "counter-revolutionary elements"; land reform involving the confiscation without compensation of land owned by religious endowments, "kulaks", or "feudalists"; nationalisation of residential property in urban areas; and the extension of state control over all sectors of the economy. Politically, the congress emphasised the creation of popular organisations over existing institutions, mandating the rapid formation of local popular councils, with the Supreme People's Council serving as the highest body within this new structure. In terms of security, the congress reflected leftist distrust of the British-created army by calling for the strengthening of the National Front's Popular Guard and the creation of a popular militia composed of trade unionists, peasant and student unions, and other revolutionary bodies. In exchange, they agreed to a "compromise leadership" for the country under al-Shaabi's presidency.

After the congress, the Qahtan-led right-wing faction released an official statement criticising their opponents' "infantile leftism". They singled out what they saw as the key mistake: the belief in class conflict and the imposition of a dictatorship of one class, rather than striving for harmony between classes. This critique reflected one of the central tenets of Nasserism: the rejection of class conflict as a defining characteristic of Arab Socialism. Qahtan's faction also condemned the left for its criticism of the "brother" Arab countries, arguing that such ideas were out of touch with the realities of South Yemeni society. They accused the left of overlooking local conditions and dismissing the NLF as a coalition of labouring forces, instead of viewing it as a party for a single class, as the left suggested. Additionally, they argued that the left mistakenly compared South Yemeni society to 19th-century European societies, ignoring the significant differences in religion, tradition, history, economics, and customs.

=== Conflict in the National Front ===
The Fourth Congress was a victory for the left. The congress defined the NF as "a revolutionary organization that represents the interests of the workers, peasants, soldiers, and revolutionary intellectuals and adopts scientific socialism as its method of analysis and practice." Party membership was restricted to the aforementioned groups. Following the end of the congress, the party initiated the immediate creation of popular councils, implemented agrarian reform, nationalised foreign capital, conducted a purge of the army and its administration, and introduced a program of mass education. Consequently, the army did not agree with the outcomes of the congress, as it was facing a purge. During the congress, leading army officials had been carrying out propaganda campaigns within the army in which they denounced "communist influence", and following the end of the congress, they decided to stage a coup. The army decided to take action when NF cadres in Aden held a meeting on 19 March 1968, in support of the Fourth Congress's outcomes. On 20 March 1968, a group of officers, led by army commander Colonel Hussein Osman Aschal, arrested eight leaders of the left-wing General Command, surrounded the presidential residence, and demanded that a new government be formed to "liberate the country from the communist threat." However, the officers lacked sufficient support, and al-Shaabi himself, for whom the coup was intended, distanced himself from the rebels as a series of demonstrations against the coup broke out in Aden, Ja'ar, Yafa, and Hadhramaut against the insurgents. The rebellion ultimately failed.

Qahtan ordered the release of imprisoned cadres as a gesture of support for leftist leaders, describing the army's actions as "sincere, but in error." He also took steps to arrest those involved in the army's conspiracy. To strengthen his radical image, he quickly passed a land reform act that confiscated lands and redistributed them to National Front supporters. Opposition was already spreading from below: the Organization of True Partisans demanded an end to the "riot of the communists". The student newspaper Al-Unf al-Thawri advocated for extreme measures, suggesting that "ashtrays be made from the skulls of the bourgeoisie, and fertilizer from their bones." The army dealt a significant setback to the left, pushing them out of key positions within both the Aden party and the government. Additional arrests followed, causing many cadres to flee from Aden and seek refuge in the hinterlands or North Yemen.

On 30 March 1968, the right-wing faction, unhappy with the results of the congress, staged a violent purge of left-wingers to reverse the policies adopted at the congress. It led to their temporary dominance in the party, but the purge ultimately failed. Protests took place in Aden on 1 May 1968, where the participants were barely kept from clashing. Two days later, fighting broke out in the Madinat Asha'ab district between left-wing students and soldiers following an incident involving the distribution of socialist leaflets. The uprising was suppressed, but on 14 May, the left-wing staged a counter-coup, led by Abdul Fattah Ismail and Salim Rubaya Ali. 14 out of the 21 members of the General Committee gathered in Zinjibar and demanded that the president implement the decisions adopted at the Fourth Congress. The situation escalated into a military confrontation, but the left's rebellion ultimately failed due to a combination of political immaturity and the prevalence of extremist ideas within its ranks, which undermined its effectiveness. Negotiations with Ali Antar took place, where al-Shaabi agreed to a compromise which resulted in the participants involved in the uprising not only avoiding repression but also regaining their previous high-ranking positions.

In October 1968, the left was officially reintegrated into the National Front's leadership following negotiations between Ismail and Faysal al-Shaabi. While the left did not immediately regain governmental roles, the two factions reached a political agreement known as the "Programme for Completion of the Stage of National Democratic Liberation". This initiative emphasised internal party unity, collective leadership, and structural reforms aimed at countering external threats and preventing internal divisions, including tribal conflicts. It also emphasised the importance of restructuring the military and fostering revolutionary awareness. There was a shared belief across the political spectrum that the armed forces needed to be firmly under the control of the party to avoid them becoming a destabilising force.

== Political shift ==
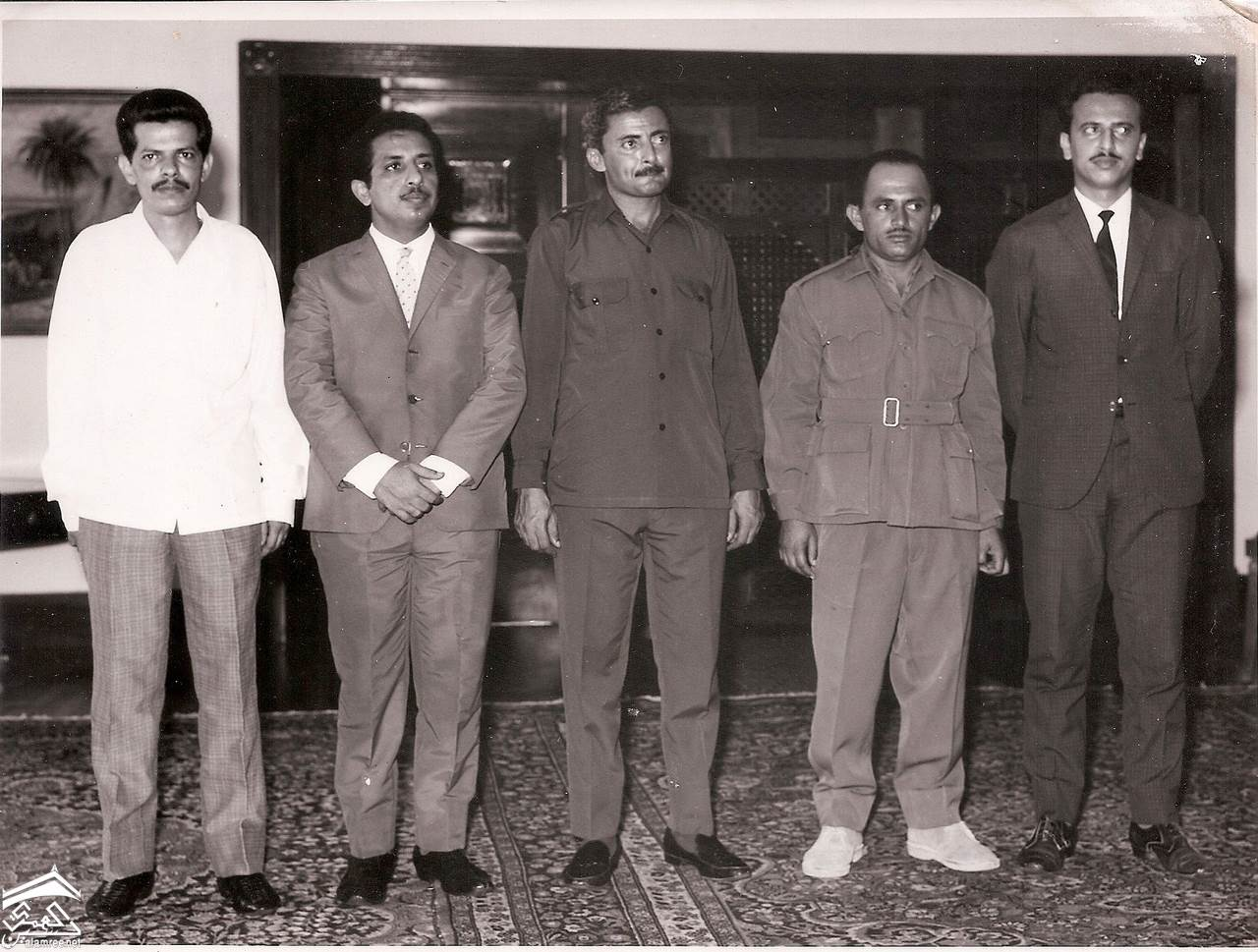
Chairman and members of the Presidium of the Supreme People's Council after the Corrective Move, taken on 26 June 1969.; From left to right: Abdul Fattah Ismail, Muhammad Saleh al-Aulaqi, Salim Rubaya Ali (Salemin), Ali Antar, Muhammad Ali Haitham

In early 1969, president and prime minister Qahtan al-Shaabi was in conflict with multiple ministers and members of the General Command of the National Front (NF), and began to lose support from all factions as a result of his autocratic style of rule. Members of the left-wing-led General Command had undermined him and forced him to resign from his position as prime minister as part of a cabinet reshuffle on 6 April 1969, where he was replaced with Faysal al-Shaabi.

A few weeks later, Qahtan quarrelled with the Interior Minister, Muhammad Ali Haitham, over the issue of "monitoring the President's telephones." Haitham was a right-wing leader who enjoyed the support of the army and had recently started building his relations with the left, a move that Qahtan resented. This growing tension between the two was part of broader disagreements within the leadership, as other members, particularly within the military and security apparatus, had their own vested interests in maintaining control over key positions. On 15 or 16 June 1969, Qahtan dismissed Haitham from his post. The move had been made to prevent Haitham, who aimed to become prime minister, from garnering more support from the armed forces.

The General Command of the National Front declared this decision unilateral, taken without consultation with the front's leadership, and called for a meeting where the left had argued for Haitham to be reinstated. A four-day dispute followed. Qahtan and Faysal argued that Qahtan's dismissal of Haytham was within his rights as president; on the other hand, the opposition had criticised Qahtan's departure from "the principle of collective responsibility" and accused him of trying to become a dictator. Qahtan soon found himself facing an opposition he could no longer control.

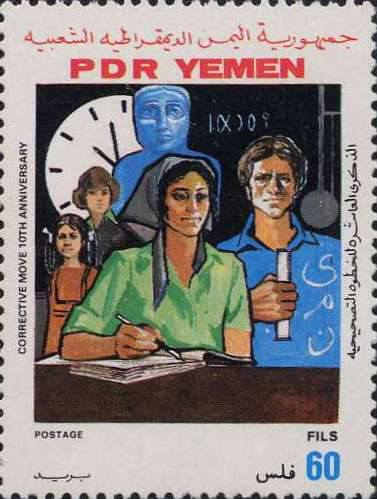
60 Fils postage stamp commemorating the 10th anniversary of the Corrective Move

On 22 June 1969, Qahtan and Faisal al-Shaabi offered to resign, believing that the opposition was too weak to accept their offer. The opposition accepted their resignations and deployed a small contingent of troops to secure the way to the radio station, where their resignations were announced. Following his expulsion, Qahtan was imprisoned and later placed under house arrest, where he remained until his death from intracerebral haemorrhage in 1981. Faisal was later arrested on 31 March 1970 and was shot after an escape attempt a few days later. By late November 1969, the General Leadership session expelled 21 right-wing leaders from the organisation, including the ousted president.

In the wake of these events, the NF leadership issued a statement condemning the "individualistic actions" of Qahtan and Faisal, which it argued had diverted the revolution from its rightful course. The statement asserted that the revolution could only succeed through the popular authority of the NF, describing it as the only force capable of safeguarding the country from "the dangers of individualist inclination". It declared that the National Charter of the NF was the guiding framework for the revolution. The statement also emphasized the importance of strengthening relations with the Soviet Union and other socialist nations, while seeking improved ties with Arab countries. It affirmed the leadership's support for left-wing groups in the Yemen Arab Republic, the Popular Front for the Liberation of the Occupied Arabian Gulf in Oman, and revolutionary movements throughout the Arabian Peninsula.

This was swiftly followed by a series of measures designed to consolidate the power of the left and implement its policies. The new collective leadership was composed of figures from the NF's "secondary leadership" who had supported leftist policies in factional struggles dating back to the formation of the NF in 1965. Salim Rubaya Ali, a prominent military leader during the Aden Emergency and organiser of the Crater city and May 1968 uprisings against Qahtan, became the new president and chairman of the council. Haitham was appointed Prime Minister; Abdul Fattah Ismail became General Secretary of the NF; Ali Nasser was named Commander in Chief of the Armed Forces; and Mohammad Saleh Aulaqi took the post of Defence Minister. The cabinet was further filled with other leaders from the left-wing faction.

== Aftermath and reforms ==
=== State and government ===
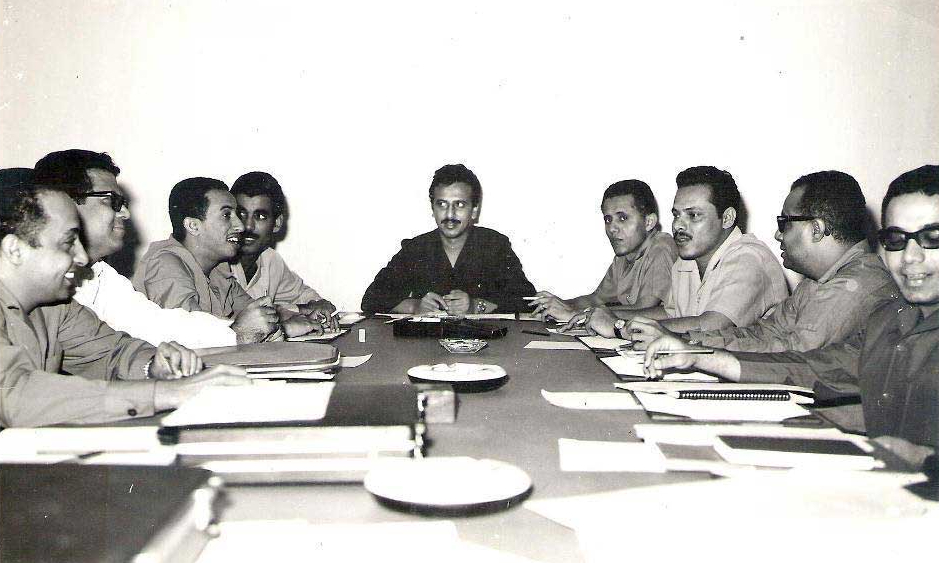
A meeting of the newly formed Muhammad Ali Haitham cabinet after the success of the coup, December 1969

Noel Brehony described the Corrective Move as "the most decisive event in the early history of independent south Yemen [sic]" as it transformed South Yemen into a "truly revolutionary state". According to a bulletin issued by a South Yemeni embassy in 1977, the Corrective Move had "restored the revolution to its correct course," which was socialism through Marxism. The move had brought revolutionary socialists to power, and the National Front (NF) became the only authorised political organisation.

The state came under the rule of a 5-member Presidential Council, assuming the functions previously held by Qahtan. Salim Rubaya Ali became the chairman of the council. (Note: Other members of the council were Abdul Fattah Ismail, Muhammad Ali Haitham, Ali Antar and Muhammad Saleh al-Aulaqi) In August 1971, Muhammad Ali Haitham resigned and went into exile after a dispute with the left-wing leadership. Following his departure, the council was reduced to three members: Salim Rubaya Ali, Abdul Fattah Ismail, and the new prime minister, Ali Nasir Muhammad.

A new constitution was drafted with the help of East German and Egyptian experts. It was adopted on 30 November 1970, the state's third anniversary of independence. The constitution changed the state's name to the People's Democratic Republic of Yemen (PDRY), a change that had upset the leaders of the Yemen Arab Republic, who thought that the PDRY was asserting the right to rule both Yemens.

The NF continued to rule the PDRY until 1978, when it alongside the People's Vanguard Party and the Democratic Popular Union Party merged by convening the 1st Congress of the Yemeni Socialist Party (YSP) on 11–13 October 1978. That congress elected the 1st Central Committee of the YSP, which in turn elected Abdul Fattah Ismail as party general secretary. Pursuing socialist policies, the ruling party transformed South Yemen into a welfare state, and according to Helen Lackner, the state had good education, women's rights, and low corruption. The new government, committed to uplifting the "toiling masses", excluded "feudalists" such as sultans, sheikhs, and their like from its people-oriented planning. The liquidation of this class formed an integral part of its broader agenda for social transformation. In 1986, the country faced another party split and a bloody coup attempt.

=== Social structure ===
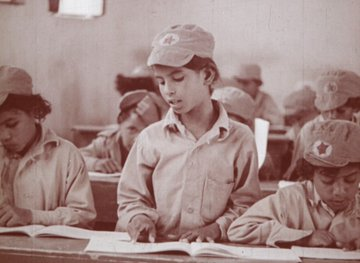
Yemeni girls in school

A decree banning tribalism was adopted in 1970, alongside the promulgation of a new Agrarian Reform Law. In 1974, the Family Code was adopted. The law established a minimum marriage age of 18 for men and 16 for women, and prohibited marriages with an age gap greater than 20 years unless the woman was at least 35 years old. The law also required the registration of marriages, set the mahr at a maximum of YD100, and placed strict legal regulations on polygamy. A man could only marry a second wife if he received written permission from a district court, and only on specific grounds such as the first wife's sterility or chronic illness. Furthermore, if the wife objected, she could seek a divorce.

By 1985, adult literacy, which had been around 15 per cent shortly after the 14 October Revolution, had risen to an estimated 53 per cent. Saeed Abd al Khair Al Noban, a South Yemeni education specialist and former minister of education, argued that Britain's educational efforts in the region had been driven by colonial interests rather than the well-being of South Yemenis. As a result, education became a high priority for the new government, which set the ambitious goal of achieving total adult literacy. While this goal had not yet been fully achieved by 1985, literacy rates had increased significantly, thanks to various government initiatives aimed at eradicating illiteracy.

The government also faced the challenge of expanding school infrastructure. In 1962, South Yemen had only two secondary schools: one in Aden and one in Hadhramaut. By the mid-1980s, Hadhramaut alone had 15 secondary schools. Between 1966 and 1981, nearly 700 new schools were built, and funding for education increased substantially, with education constituting an average of 18 per cent of the total government budget.

=== Infrastructure ===
==== Agrarian and economic reforms ====
On 27 November 1969, the government nationalised the country's main economic sectors. According to the decree that nationalised them, all foreign monopolies in the commercial, financial, and banking sectors of the local economy were abolished and transferred to the state sector. The redistributed lands were prohibited from being sold, and exploitative mortgage practices were outlawed.

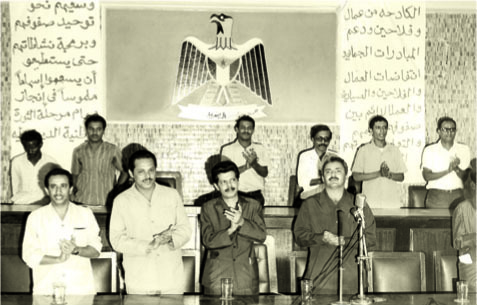
Salemin, Abdul Fattah Ismail and Ali Nasir Muhammad during the peasant revolt they organised, 1970

The Marxist government soon organised several peasant uprisings, which came to be known as the "Seven Glorious Days", in the country in preparation for the implementation of socialist reforms in agriculture. The first of these took place on 3 October 1970 in the southern regions and was followed by similar uprisings in other parts of the country. Later, the government issued an Agrarian Reform Ordinance, which greatly increased the importance of the public cooperative sector, for example, by creating several state farms and agricultural cooperatives. In July 1971, the government organised the first Poor Peasants' Congress, which adopted several resolutions and recommendations, aimed at "solving the agricultural question" through the peasant uprisings.

Five years later, the government organised a Constituent Congress, which in turn created the Union of Democratic Yemeni Peasants. All these measures gave a noticeable boost to agriculture: according to official data, the growth of the agricultural sector was 70 per cent. The production of eggs, chicken, dairy products, vegetables, and fruits increased significantly. The First Five-Year Plan achieved notable progress in agriculture, with a strong emphasis on boosting the production of foodstuffs and raw materials vital for industrial development. It also prioritised the expansion and improvement of irrigation systems to enhance food security and reduce reliance on imports. From 1971 to 1977, the government allocated £34 million toward the agricultural sector – 22 per cent of its development budget.

==== Housing ====
Before Yemen's unification in 1990, the Aden governorate was the only region with an effective real property registration system, introduced during British colonial rule. This system registered large private landholdings and state-owned land, providing secure property titles. After British withdrawal in 1967, the system remained until the Housing Law in 1972 (also known as Housing Confiscation Law No. 32), issued on 5 August 1972, which cancelled all titles and declared real property as state-owned.

The 1972 Housing Law nationalised all housing that was not owner-occupied, including many properties previously owned by the British, and made them available for rent at very low costs. The law ensured that only owner-occupiers could retain ownership of their homes, while second homes were rented out by the state. A rent reduction of 25% was also implemented, reflecting broader income cuts. The Ministry of Housing regulated rents based on the tenant's status, with foreign embassies and UN personnel paying higher rents, expatriates on lower salaries paying less, and Yemenis paying the lowest rents.

==== Health care ====
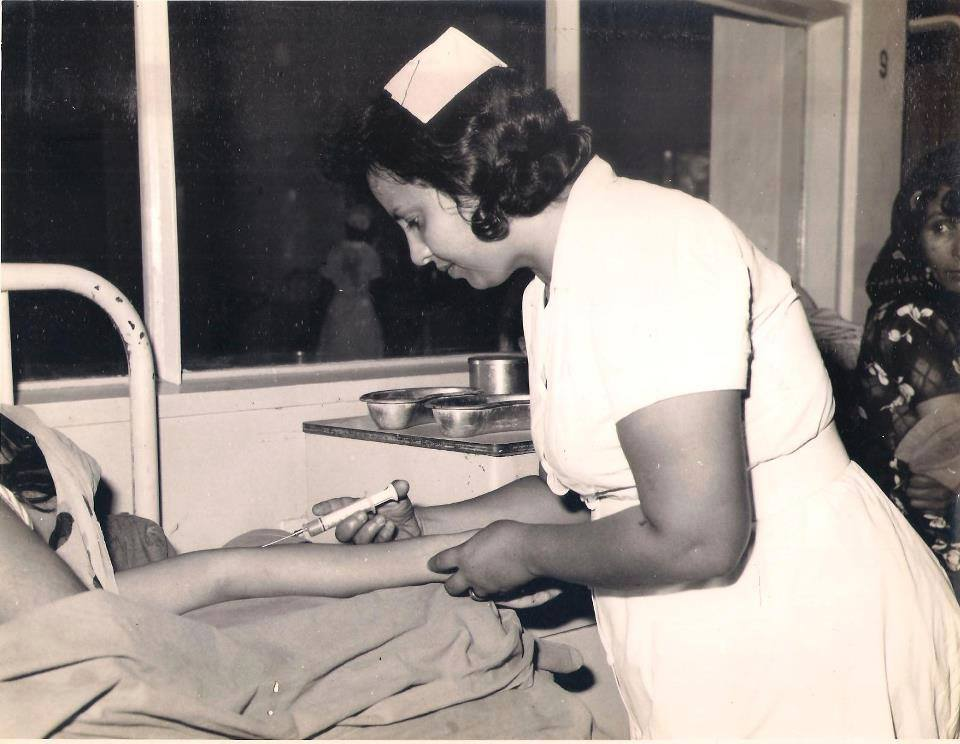
Yemeni nurse

The new government emphasised the importance of adopting policies aimed at modernising health care and providing it to all its citizens. For example, in the reports to the Unification Congress of the National Front, the need was noted for such things as: training and development of medical personnel, the establishment of several medical institutes, and the opening of hospitals and other medical centres in all governorates of South Yemen.

The health sector saw significant advancements with the creation of the Institute of Health Studies, followed by the establishment of the Aden University Medical School, which began training local doctors in the mid-1980s. By this time, it was estimated that the physician-to-population ratio was 1 to 7,200. A network of clinics, health posts, small medical centres, and hospitals was established and staffed across the country, with even the smallest facilities offering essential services through trained medical assistants or nurses. Health care services, including medications, were provided free of charge, ensuring accessible and effective care for all citizens.

By 1985, South Yemen had made significant progress in improving public health. Life expectancy increased from an estimated 36 years in 1960 to between 45 and 47 years, with most of this improvement occurring after 1967. During the same period, the country also succeeded in reducing infant mortality rates. The total fertility rate was estimated at 6.9 children per woman, while the crude birth rate was approximately 48 and the crude death rate was 19, still high compared to many other countries. Despite this, the country saw a relatively high population growth rate.

==== Electrification ====
Britain did not attempt to electrify areas outside of the Aden Colony, leaving most of the country in darkness after they left the country. As a result, the socialist authorities established the Public Corporation for Electric Power (PCEP) in 1969 under the Ministry of Industry, with responsibility for the generation, transmission, and distribution of electricity in the country's main population centres. The early goals of PCEP were to restart power plants, connect them to the general electricity grid, and establish a training centre for Yemeni personnel in the electrical field. Additionally, the government and PCEP launched three and five-year plans aimed at increasing electricity production to meet the needs of the South Yemenis.

In 1982, only about 29 per cent of the population had access to public power, with the goal of reaching 44 per cent by 1985: 83 per cent of the urban population and 22 per cent of the rural population. By the mid-1980s, considerable progress had been made. The primary power system, which served a broad area around Aden and included interconnected generating units, expanded from a capacity of approximately 38 megawatts in 1972 to more than 120 megawatts by 1984. In addition to supplying electricity to several major towns, PCEP also held a 60 per cent stake in various local power facilities. In 1984, the country had an estimated 166 megawatts of capacity, with PCEP controlling around 140 megawatts. By 1986, two more electrical projects were projected to be operational in Wadi Hadhramaut and five towns to the east of Al Mukalla.

== See also ==
- June 13 Corrective Movement – 1974 coup in the Yemen Arab Republic
- Revolutionary Corrective Initiative – Reforms in the Yemen Arab Republic
- Corrective Movement (Egypt) – Reform introduced by Anwar Sadat in Egypt
- Corrective Revolution (Syria) – 1970 coup led by Hafez al-Assad
- Corrective Movement program (Syria) - reformist program by Hafez al-Assad
