= 1974 Family Law =

Family code in South Yemeni law

Supreme People's Council
- Territorial extent: South Yemen

Legislative history
- Bill title: Family Law of 1974

The 1974 Family Law, also known as the Family Code, was a landmark legal reform aimed at transforming personal status laws and advancing gender equality in the People's Democratic Republic of Yemen (PDRY). Introduced by the socialist government that came to power in the late 1960s, the legislation reflected the regime's broader objectives of social and economic modernization, including the emancipation of women.

== Background ==
Following the British withdrawal from Aden in 1967, power was transferred to the National Liberation Front (NLF), which soon saw its radical socialist faction take control in a political shift known as the "Corrective Move" of June 1969. The newly established People's Democratic Republic of Yemen pursued wide-ranging reforms in economic, political, and social spheres. The new leadership committed to gender equality and women's emancipation as part of its national development strategy.

These goals were codified in the 1970 Constitution, particularly in Article 36, which guaranteed equal rights for men and women in all political, economic, and social fields. The state aimed to provide the conditions necessary to achieve substantive equality gradually. This political commitment led to a series of legislative and institutional measures, including the introduction of the 1974 Family Law, the extension of voting rights to women in 1970, and efforts to encourage women's participation in national elections and labor mobilization programs.

== Legal provisions ==
The 1974 Family Law significantly altered the traditional legal framework governing personal status issues in South Yemen. It treated marriage as a civil contract based on mutual respect and equality, requiring the full consent of both spouses. Unlike many other systems in the region, the law eliminated the need for male guardianship in marriage contracts and required official registration and signatures from both parties. The law also established a minimum marriage age of 18 for men and 16 for women, and prohibited marriages with an age gap greater than 20 years unless the woman was at least 35 years old.

In matters of divorce, the law prohibited unilateral repudiation (talaq) and stipulated that both men and women had equal rights to petition for divorce before a court. Legal grounds for divorce were identical for both spouses, and proceedings were overseen by judicial authorities.

Regarding the payment of dowries, the law introduced regulations aimed to reduce the financial burden often associated with marriage. It set upper limits on dowry amounts in order to make marriage more accessible and prevent excessive demands.

Child custody provisions favored the mother, even in cases where she remarried. Boys remained under the mother's custody until the age of ten and girls until the age of fifteen, although final custody decisions were left to the discretion of the court, which was instructed to act in the best interest of the child.

Polygamy was placed under strict legal regulation. A man could only marry a second wife if he received written permission from a district court, and only on specific grounds such as the first wife's sterility or chronic illness. Furthermore, if the wife objected, she could seek a divorce.

The law also mandated the shared responsibility of household duties between husband and wife. It explicitly abolished the traditional legal expectation of a wife's obedience to her husband, emphasizing the partnership model of marriage and aligning with the regime's broader goals of gender equality.

== Implementation and social impact ==
The passage of the Family Law came after extensive internal debate and some public resistance in a society still largely governed by conservative social norms. In the short term, a noticeable increase in divorce filings was observed, which officials attributed to women exercising their new legal rights. However, the number of divorces eventually stabilized, and legal officials and women's advocates pointed to an improvement in women's ability to seek justice and protection under the law.

The law formed part of a broader set of reforms aimed at integrating women into all spheres of life. In rural areas, economic necessity had long required women to work outside the home, and nearly one-third of the agricultural labor force was female. The state sought to build on this precedent by expanding women's opportunities in education, employment, and political life. Female literacy campaigns were launched, vocational training was expanded, and women were actively encouraged to participate in national development plans.

== Role of the General Union of Yemeni Women ==
The General Union of Yemeni Women (GUYW), established in 1967 shortly after independence, played a central role in the promotion and implementation of the 1974 Family Law. Initially limited to a few urban centers such as Aden, Lahej, and Abyan, the GUYW expanded its reach through public education campaigns and legal advocacy. Prior to the law's passage, they focused on promoting literacy and raising awareness about pending legal reforms. After 1974, its members took on additional responsibilities such as acting as marriage counselors, mediating disputes, and ensuring compliance with the new law.

The GUYW also worked to prevent forced or underage marriages and intervened in cases where marriage arrangements violated legal standards. Its members often acted as community representatives, promoting women's rights and challenging male-dominated interpretations of family life. In addition to legal advocacy, the GUYW ran vocational training programs aimed at improving women's economic independence. These included courses in secretarial work, sewing, embroidery, and, in some cases, mechanical skills. Health education and childcare training were also part of the Union's broader effort to improve women's social and economic position.

In many smaller towns and villages, the GUYW played a pivotal political role, initiating debates, confronting discrimination, and providing practical support to women navigating family law issues. The GUYW served both as an extension of state policy and as a grassroots organization advocating for expanded rights for women.

== Regional comparison ==
The 1974 Family Law was among the most progressive personal status laws in the Arab world at the time. While it did not completely outlaw practices such as polygamy, it introduced strict legal controls and established women's formal equality with men in key aspects of family life. Compared to North Yemen and many other regional counterparts, the law represented a significant departure from traditional interpretations of Islamic family law. It was part of a larger socialist project that aimed to reconstruct society along egalitarian lines and demonstrated the state's willingness to use legislation as a tool for social change.

== Post-unification changes ==
Following the unification of South and North Yemen in 1990, the issue of family law emerged as one of the most contested topics, particularly with regard to women's legal status. Many women in the former PDRY feared that the unification would undermine the legal protections they had gained under the 1974 Family Law. Just before unification, women in Aden held demonstrations demanding assurances that these rights would be preserved. Although political leaders offered verbal support, the matter was soon de-prioritized.

In 1992, a new Personal Status Law (Law No. 20) was enacted by presidential decree without parliamentary approval. The new law largely drew from the more conservative 1978 family law of the former Yemen Arab Republic, effectively replacing many of the progressive elements of the southern legal framework. The law was criticized in the south for affirming patriarchal norms. In contrast, the reaction in the north was generally more favorable; the new law was seen as a modest improvement over the existing 1978 family law, particularly among those who had long regarded the southern model as overly permissive or "un-Islamic."

The law defined marriage as a legal contract granting the husband lawful access to his wife, required male guardianship for marriage contracts, and accepted the silent consent of a virgin woman as sufficient. In terms of divorce, it permitted men to repudiate their wives without cause, while women could only request divorce under specific conditions, such as harm or mutual agreement (khul'), which required the husband's consent. The wife was also legally obliged to obey her husband in several defined areas, including residence, sexual relations, household responsibilities, and freedom of movement.

Polygamy was permitted under the condition that the husband had a "legitimate interest" and the financial means to support multiple wives. While the law required that the first wife be informed, it did not give her the right to object or to seek divorce on that basis.

These legal changes reflected broader political dynamics at the time, including resistance from northern religious and tribal leaders who opposed the more egalitarian principles associated with the former socialist south. The resulting legislation marked a significant shift away from the legal reforms of the PDRY and underscored the influence of conservative forces in the post-unification legal landscape.

== See also ==
- Women in Yemen
- Women in Islam
- Women in the Arab world

== Bibliography ==
- Arenfeldt, Pernille; Al-Hassan Golley, Nawar (2012). Mapping Arab Women's Movements: A Century of Transformations from Within. American University in Cairo Press. ISBN 978-977-416-498-9.
- Clark, Victoria (2010). Yemen: Dancing on the Heads of Snakes (PDF). Yale University Press. ISBN 978-0-300-16734-4.
- Hijab, Nadia (1988). Womanpower: The Arab Debate on Women at Work. Cambridge University Press. ISBN 9780521269926.
- Lackner, Helen (1985). PDR Yemen: outpost of socialist development in Arabia. Ithaca Press. ISBN 0863720323.
- Manea, Elham (2012). The Arab State and Women's Rights: The Trap of Authoritarian Governance. Taylor & Francis. ISBN 9781136663109.
- Molyneux, Maxine; Yafai, Aida; Mohsen, Aisha; Ba'abaad, Noor (1979). "Women and Revolution in the People's Democratic Republic of Yemen". Feminist Review (1): 4–20. doi:10.2307/1394747. JSTOR 1394747.
- Stookey, Robert W. (1982). South Yemen: A Marxist Republic in Arabia (PDF). Westview Press. ISBN 978-0-7099-2356-5.
