= Muhammad Umar Bahah =

Yemeni writer and journalist

Muhammad Umar Bahah is a Yemeni writer and journalist. Originally from South Yemen, he wrote for several newspapers and was press secretary of Ali Nasir Muhammad, two-time president of South Yemen. Bahah's work has been translated into English and Italian and was included in the anthologies Oranges in the Sun (2006) and Perle dello Yemen (2009).
