= President of South Yemen =

Yemen head of state and elected official

President of the People's Democratic Republic of Yemen
- رئيس جمهورية اليمن الديمقراطية الشعبية
- Presidential standard of South Yemen

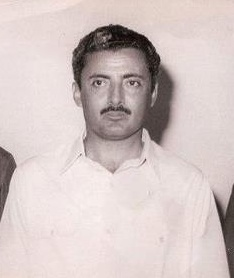
- Longest serving Salim Rubaya Ali; 23 June 1969 – 26 June 1978
- Residence: Al-Maashiq Palace
- Seat: Crater, Aden Governorate
- Appointer: General Command, Politburo, Central Committee or any party apparatus
- Formation: 30 November 1967; 58 years ago
- First holder: Qahtan Muhammad al-Shaabi (as President)
- Final holder: Haidar Abu Bakr al-Attas (as President)
- Abolished: May 22, 1990; 36 years ago

The People's Democratic Republic of Yemen, commonly referred to as South Yemen, gained independence as the People's Republic of South Yemen on 30 November 1967. The President of the Republic served as head of state, appointing a Prime Minister to serve as head of government.

On 22 June 1969, the left wing of National Front (NF) took power following the Corrective Move, reorganizing the government. The Chairman of the Presidential Council became the head of state. This was followed closely in 1970 by the renaming of the country to the People's Democratic Republic of Yemen. Another reorganization in 1978, following the establishment of the Yemeni Socialist Party in October, changed the title of the head of state to Chairman of the Presidium of the Supreme People's Council. This lasted until unification with the Yemen Arab Republic on 22 May 1990, when the then-Chairman became the Prime Minister of the united Yemen.

== President of the People's Republic of South Yemen ==
No.	Portrait	Name (Birth–Death)	Term of office			Party
No.	Portrait	Name (Birth–Death)	Took office	Left office	Time in office	Party
1		Qahtan Muhammad al-Shaabi قحطان محمد الشعبي (1920–1981)	30 November 1967	22 June 1969	1 year, 204 days	National Front

== Chairman of the Presidential Council ==
The Presidential Council of Democratic Yemen was established as part of the reforms made during the "Corrective Move", in which Qahtan al-Shaabi got overthrown by the left wing of the National Front (NF). Its role was to manage internal divisions within the National Front (NF), which evolved into the Yemeni Socialist Party in 1978, and maintain regional balance.

The council consisted of five members: Abdul Fattah Ismail of the North, Mohammed Ali Haytham of Abyan, Mohammed Saleh al-Awlaqi of Shabwa, Ali Antar of Dhale and Salim Rubaya Ali (Salmin) of Abyan who served as president. Over the next two years, personnel changes occurred, with Ali Nasir Muhammad replacing al-Awlaqi. The council's membership was based primarily on regional influence within the National Front, rather than military power, as in the Yemen Arab Republic up north.

The council's structure, with equal power for all members, resulted in a de facto triple presidency shared by Salemin, Ismail, and Ali Nasser. However, this balance did not prevent internal strife, particularly between Rubai, who favored a pro-Chinese Maoist approach, and Ismail, who advocated for a Russian Marxist model. While Rubai relied on his regional base and the loyalty of the army, Ismail's influence stemmed from his role as the party's ideological leader and his own "Popular Militia". Ali Nasser acted as a mediator between the two. Despite the council's power-sharing arrangement, conflict persisted and ended with Salemin's execution in 1978. The council's structure mirrored the factionalism within the National Front and was never designed to be a democratic body.

No.	Portrait	Name (Birth–Death)	Term of office			Party
No.	Portrait	Name (Birth–Death)	Took office	Left office	Time in office	Party
2		Salim Rubaya Ali سالم ربيع علي "سالمين" (1935–1978)	23 June 1969	26 June 1978	9 years, 3 days	National Front
3		Ali Nasir Muhammad علي ناصر محمد الحسني (1939–)	26 June 1978	21 December 1978	184 days	National Front
(3)		Ali Nasir Muhammad علي ناصر محمد الحسني (1939–)	21 December 1978	27 December 1978	184 days	Yemeni Socialist Party

== Chairman of the Presidium of the Supreme People's Council ==
After Salmeen's assassination in 1978, Ismail briefly succeeded him, only to be replaced by Ali Nasser Mohammed after two years, and on 1986 a civil war eventually led to Ali Nasser's own removal.

No.	Portrait	Name (Birth–Death)	Term of office			Party
No.	Portrait	Name (Birth–Death)	Took office	Left office	Time in office	Party
4		Abdul Fattah Ismail عبد الفتاح إسماعيل علي الجوفي (1939–1986)	27 December 1978	21 April 1980	1 year, 116 days	Yemeni Socialist Party
(3)		Ali Nasir Muhammad علي ناصر محمد الحسني (1939–)	21 April 1980	24 January 1986	5 years, 278 days	Yemeni Socialist Party
5		Haidar Abu Bakr al-Attas حيدر أبو بكر العطاس (1939–)	24 January 1986	22 May 1990	4 years, 118 days	Yemeni Socialist Party

For Presidents after unification in 1990, see: List of Presidents of Yemen

== President of the Democratic Republic of Yemen, 1994 ==
South Yemen also rebelled as the Democratic Republic of Yemen for a period of weeks in 1994.

Portrait	Name	Took Office	Left Office	Leading Party
	Ali Salem al-Beidh	21 May 1994	7 July 1994	Yemeni Socialist Party
