= Muhammad Ali Haitham =

Yemeni politician

- محمد علي هيثم
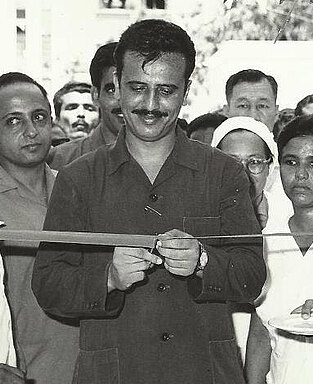
- Muhammad Ali Haitham inaugurating the People's Hospital in Crater, 1971

2nd Prime Minister of South Yemen
- In office 1969–1971

Minister of Labour and Social Affairs
- In office 1 May 1993 – 10 July 1993

Personal details
- Born: 7 March 1940
- Died: 10 July 1993
- Party: National Front

Muhammad Ali Haitham (7 March 1940 – 10 July 1993) (Arabic: محمد علي هيثم) was the 2nd Prime Minister of the People's Democratic Republic of Yemen (South Yemen).

Haitham was appointed prime minister of the People's Democratic Republic of Yemen in 1969. He replaced Faysal al-Shaabi in the post. Salim Rubai Ali and the left wing of National Liberation Front (of which both Rubai and Haitham were members) took power in the country on 22 June 1969. Haitham was replaced with Ali Nasir Mohammed after he resigned from his post and left the country in August 1971.

Haitham then formed the United Yemen Front (a political movement against the socialist regime in South Yemen) and lived in exile until the unification of the two Yemens in 1990. He played an important role in helping Yemen to have its first parliamentary elections in April 1993. Haitham was appointed minister of social and labor affairs in May 1993.

Haitham died on 10 July 1993. His daughter, Sosan Ali Haitham, claim that he died due to a heart attack, but the circumstances of his death are still a source of debate today.

Political offices
Preceded by Faysal al-Shaabi	Prime Minister of South Yemen; 1969–1971	Succeeded by Ali Nasir Muhammad
