= Democratic Yemeni Union of Peasants =

Mass organization in South Yemen (1976- 1990)

- اتحاد الفلاحين اليمني الديمقراطي
- Abbreviation: Afid
- Founded: October 1976
- Dissolved: 1990
- Key people: Ahmed Obaid Bin Dagher (Chairman in 1980s)
- Affiliations: Trade Union International of Agricultural, Forestry and Plantation Workers; World Federation of Trade Unions

The Democratic Yemeni Union of Peasants (Arabic: اتحاد الفلاحين اليمني الديمقراطي, romanized: Ittihad al-Fallahin al-Yamani ad-Dimuqrati), abbreviated Afid (افيد), was a mass organization of the peasantry in the People's Democratic Republic of Yemen (South Yemen). Founded in 1976, the organization was part of the founding of South Yemen.

== Background ==
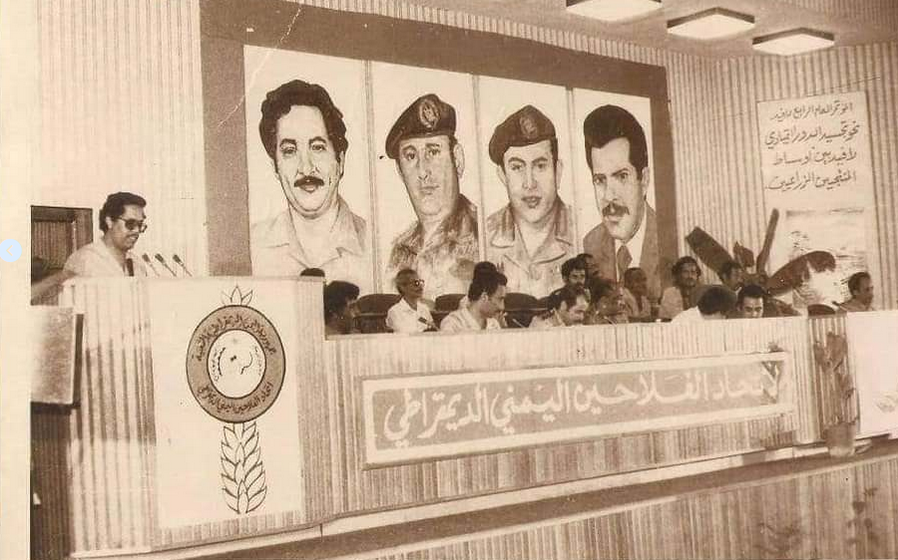
Dr. Ahmed Obaid Bin Dagher addressing the October 7, 1986 congress of the Democratic Yemeni Union of Peasants

The Fifth Congress of the National Front Political Organization held in 1972 resolved to create a revolutionary mass organization of peasants, though Afid was not founded until 1976. The founding congress was held October 7–8, 1976. Afid was conceptualized as "a voluntary mass economic, social, and political organization for cooperative farmers, individual farmers and nomadic Bedouins". Afid organized farmers' committees at district and village levels.

Afid was one of the main mass organizations in the South Yemen party-state framework. The People's Democratic Republic of Yemen Constitution of 1978 enshrined the role of Afid and Article 66 of the Constitution stated that the "Democratic Yemeni Union of Peasants shall work for deepening the alliance between the peasants and the working class and creating brotherly relations between the co-operative peasants and the individual peasants. It shall convince the peasants, by means of presenting the positive example, that the economy is best organized on the basis of co-operative collectivism. It shall also work for obliterating the illiteracy of the peasants and raising their educational, political and cultural standard."

Afid was affiliated to the Trade Union International of Agricultural, Forestry and Plantation Workers of the World Federation of Trade Unions. The organization signed agreements of cooperation with its East German counterpart in the 1980s.

== Leadership ==
Abdul Baqi Hazza was the chairman of Afid from its founding in 1976 to June 1978. In June 1978, Hazza was imprisoned in the purge that followed the seizure of power by Abdul Fattah Ismail in the lead-up to the first congress of the Yemeni Socialist Party. Thereafter, Afid leaders would generally be Central Committee members of the party. In the early 1980s, Said Saleh was the secretary of Afid. Ahmed Obaid Bin Dagher served as the Afid chairman until the Yemeni unification of 1990.
