= Salim Rubaya Ali =

President of South Yemen from 1969 to 1978

al-Rafīq Salim Rubaya Ali
- سالِم رُبَيِّع عَلي (Arabic)
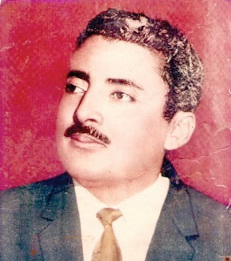
- Official portrait of Salemin

2nd President of South Yemen
- In office 22 June 1969 – 26 June 1978
- Preceded by: Qahtan Muhammad al-Shaabi
- Succeeded by: Ali Nasir Muhammad

Personal details
- Born: 17 June 1934 Aden Protectorate
- Died: 26 June 1978 (aged 44) Aden, South Yemen
- Cause of death: Execution by firing squad
- Party: National Front
- Occupation: Chairman of the Presidential Council
- Nickname: Salemin

Military service
- Allegiance: National Liberation Front (1963–1967); South Yemen (1967–1978)
- Years of service: 1963–1978
- Battles/wars: Aden Emergency; Corrective Move al-Wadiah War; Ogaden War

Salim Rubaya Ali (Arabic: سالِم رُبَيِّع عَلي; 17 June 1934 – 26 June 1978), commonly known by his nickname Salemin (Arabic: سالمين), was a Yemeni Maoist politician and revolutionary who served as the second head of state of the People's Democratic Republic of Yemen (South Yemen) from 22 June 1969 until his execution on 26 June 1978.

Ali led the left-wing faction of the National Front for the Liberation of South Yemen (NLF), which forced the British to withdraw from southern Yemen on 29 November 1967. Ali's radical Marxist faction gained dominance over the more moderate President Qahtan al-Shaabi's elements, allowing Rubaya Ali to seize power; he retained the title of Chairman of the Presidential Council throughout his term, even as the NLF changed the name of the country from the People's Republic of South Yemen to the People's Democratic Republic of Yemen in 1970.

== Final years and execution ==
Rubaya Ali's National Front joined with other parties in 1975, creating the United Political Organisation NF (التنظيم السياسي الموحد الجبهة القومية), all rival parties having been outlawed earlier. He appointed Muhammad Ali Haitham as his Prime Minister, who served until August 1971, when he was replaced by Ali Nasir Muhammad. Rubaya Ali opposed the formation of the Yemeni Socialist Party (YSP) championed by Abdul Fattah Ismail.

During this period, his administration became increasingly involved in the geopolitics of the Horn of Africa. In early 1977, he hosted a summit in Aden involving Fidel Castro and the leaders of Ethiopia and Somalia, attempting to facilitate a socialist-aligned regional federation. Following the failure of these diplomatic efforts, his government committed approximately 2,000 troops to support the Ethiopian government during the Ogaden War (1977–1978). This deployment represented a significant expansion of South Yemen's regional military commitments.

On 26 June 1978, the collective leadership of the YSP led by Abdul Fattah Ismail overthrew and executed Rubaya Ali.

Preceded by Established position	Chairmen of the Presidential Council; 23 June 1969–26 June 1978	Succeeded by Ali Nasir Muhammad
