= Abdul Fattah Ismail =

President of South Yemen from 1969 to 1980

al-Rafīq Abdul Fattah Ismail
- عبد الفتاح إسماعيل
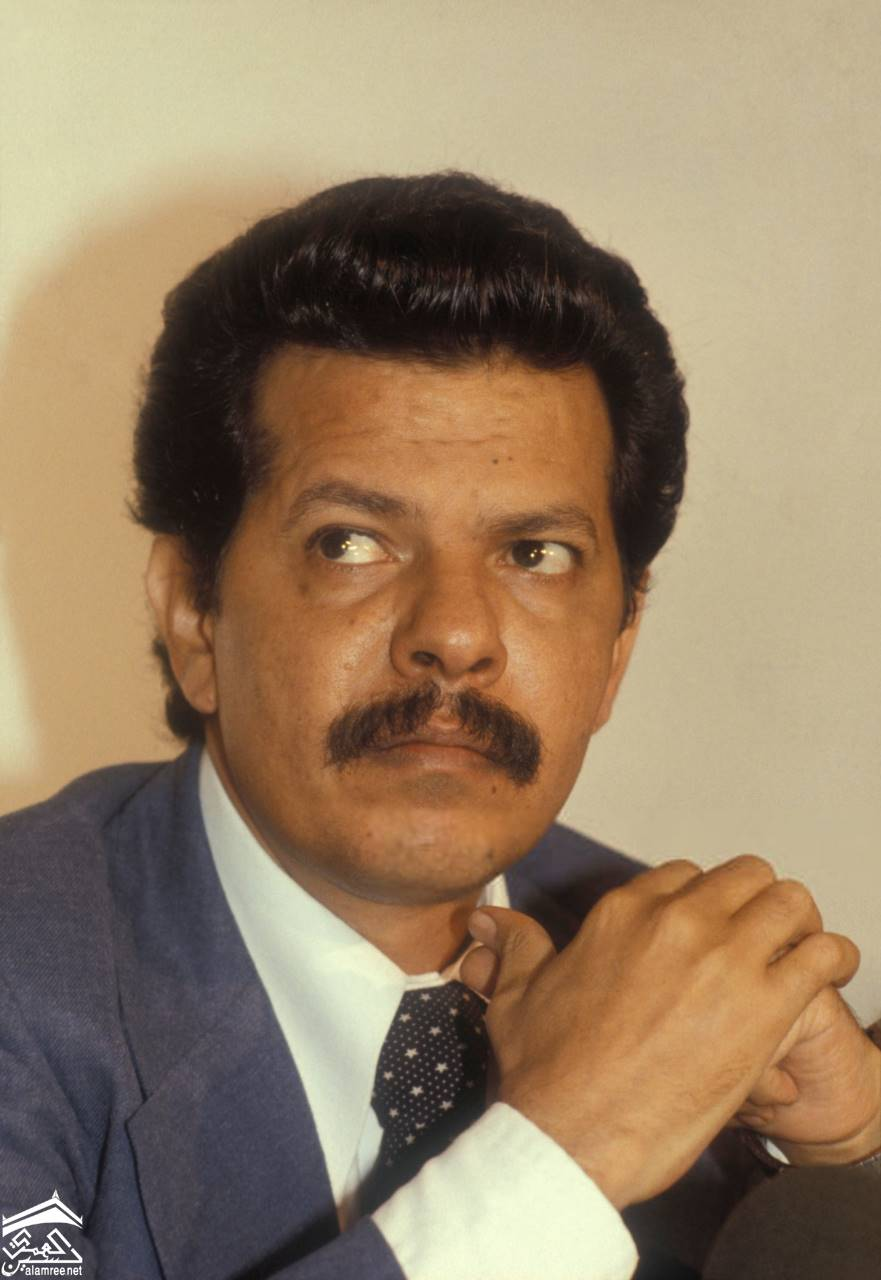
- Abdul Fattah Ismail in 1979

Chairman of the Presidium of Supreme People's Council
- In office August 1971 – 21 April 1980
- Preceded by: Position established
- Succeeded by: Ali Nasir Muhammad

1st General Secretary of the Yemeni Socialist Party
- In office 13 October 1978 – 21 April 1980
- Preceded by: Position established (himself as Secretary-General of the National Liberation Front)
- Succeeded by: Ali Nasir Muhammad

Secretary-General of the National Liberation Front
- In office 22 June 1969 – 13 October 1978
- President: Salim Rubai Ali
- Preceded by: Qahtan al-Shaabi
- Succeeded by: Position abolished (himself as General Secretary of the Yemeni Socialist Party)

Personal details
- Born: 28 July 1939 Ta'izz, Kingdom of Yemen
- Died: 13 January 1986 (aged 46) Aden, South Yemen
- Party: Yemeni Socialist Party
- Profession: Oil refinery worker, teacher
- Awards: Order of Friendship of Peoples

Military service
- Allegiance: NLF; South Yemen
- Battles/wars: Aden Emergency; First Yemenite War; Second Yemenite War

Abdul Fattah Ismail (Arabic: عبد الفتاح إسماعيل, romanized: ʿAbd al-Fattāḥ Ismāʿīl; 28 July 1939 – 13 January 1986) was a Yemeni Marxist politician and revolutionary who was the de facto leader of South Yemen from 1978 to 1980 after Salim Rubaya Ali. He served as Chairman of the Presidium of the Supreme People's Council (head of state) and founder, chief ideologue and first leader of the Yemeni Socialist Party from 21 December 1978 to 21 April 1980. He died under mysterious circumstances during the 1986 South Yemen Civil War and his body was never found.

== Early life ==
Abdul Fattah was born on 28 July 1939 in the Al-Hujariah district of the Taiz Governorate in North Yemen. Though his father was a faqīh (Islamic jurist), he had a poor and rural upbringing. He subsequently followed his elder brother to Aden (which was then a British protectorate) where he was educated at the Ahliah School in Tawahi district. When he was approximately seventeen, Abdul Fattah enrolled in a British Petroleum workers’ training center and began working in an oil refinery from 1956 to 1959 as an apprentice. In this setting, Abdul Fattah began to develop a political consciousness centered around union organizing and labour advocacy. As a co-founder of the Arab Nationalist Movement in South Yemen, he contributed to the formation of a number of Movement cells before he was arrested by the British colonial authorities in Aden for political incitement of workers.

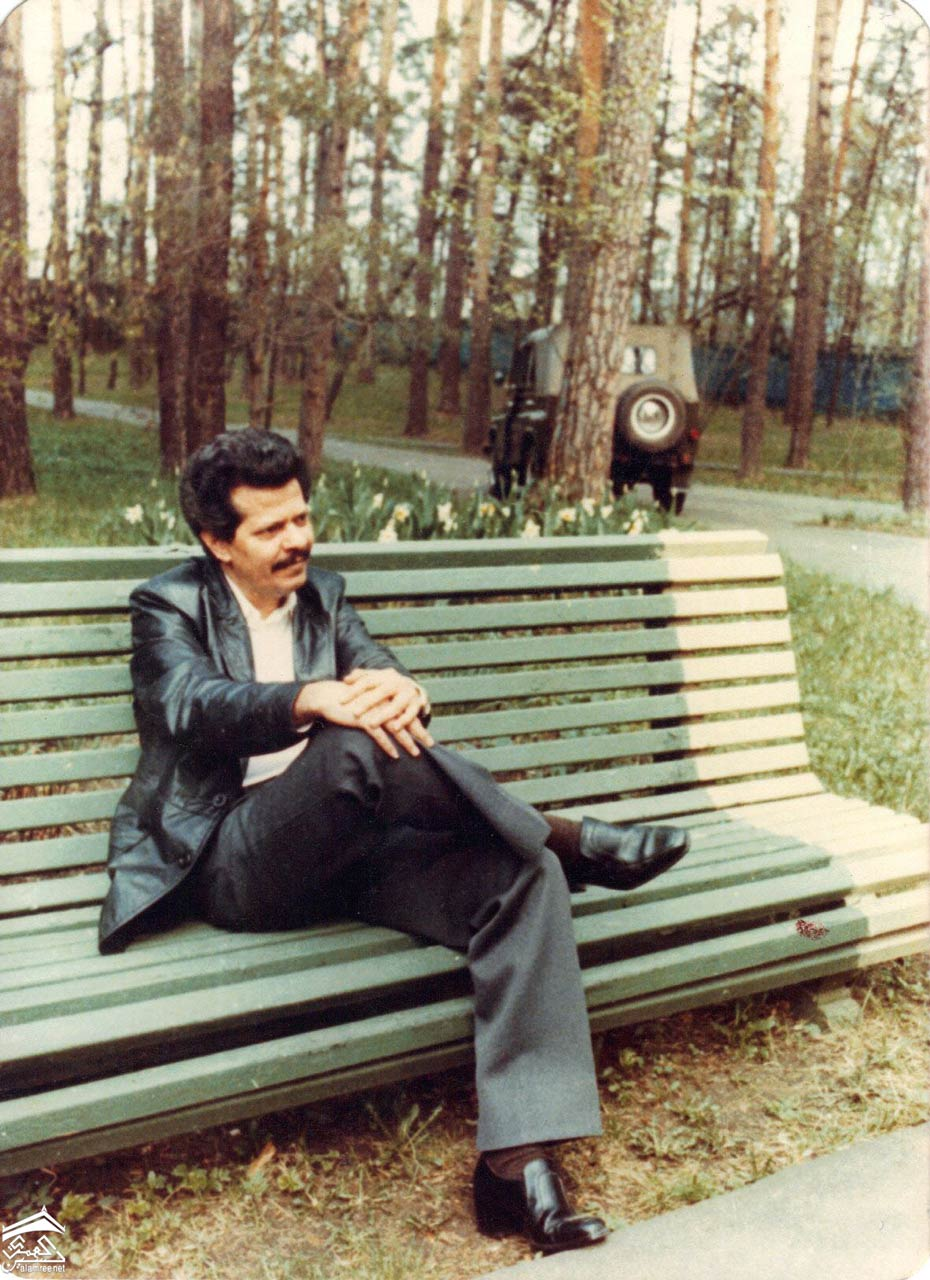
Abdul Fattah Ismail in the early 1980s during his visit to Moscow

In 1961, he became a school teacher at Al-Haswah School in Aden, and at the same time continued his involvement in political activity.

== Political career ==
=== Early political involvement ===
He was a co-founder of the National Front for the Liberation of South Yemen (NLF). After the outbreak of the Aden Emergency where the NLF sought for the liberation of South Yemen from British colonial rule, Abdul Fattah became a full-time socialist revolutionary, whereby he undertook the leadership of the NLF underground military wing (fedayeen) in Aden, as well as political activity.

He was elected to the NLF executive in the first, second and third NLF congresses, 1965–67. After South Yemen gained independence in 1967 he was appointed Minister of Culture and Yemeni Unity. In the fourth NLF congress, he was instrumental in determining the progressive line of the revolution. But in March 1968, he was arrested by the right-wing faction of the NLF and went into exile, where he drafted the program for Accomplishing National Democratic Liberation, a leftist manifesto. He undertook a leading role in the consolidation of left wing of NLF which subsequently regained power in the 22 June 1969 Corrective Move.

=== Rule of South Yemen ===
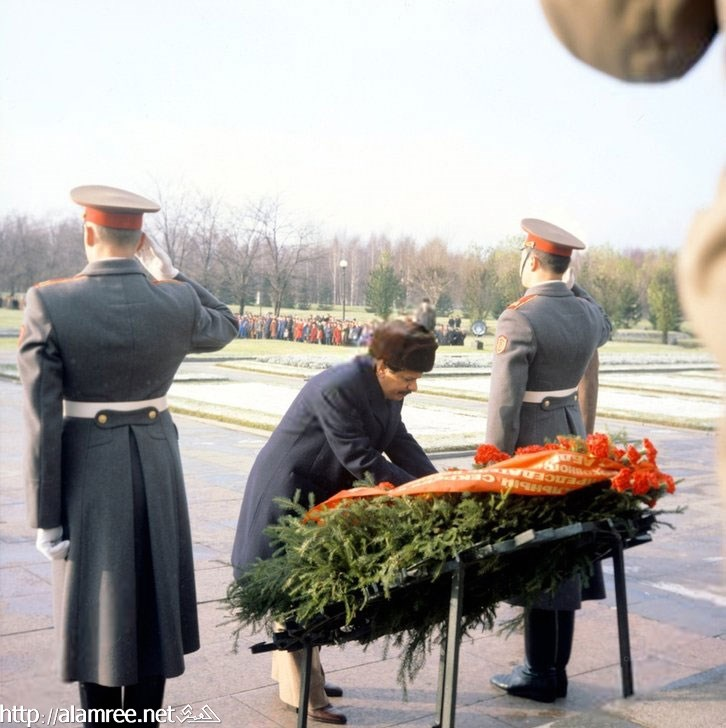
Abdel Fattah Ismail lays a wreath during his visit to the Soviet Union

After the Corrective Move, Abdul Fattah was elected Secretary General of the NLF Central Committee, thus making him the country's de facto leader. He was also elected a member of the Presidium of the Supreme People's Council. In 1970 he was elected Chairman of Presidium. He undertook a leading role in the dialogue between NLF and other left parties in south Yemen leading to the formation of the Yemeni Socialist Party (YSP). He was elected Secretary General of the YSP at the first party congress in October 1978. Ideologically, he is considered to have favored the Soviet model of socialist development (as opposed to Maoist alternatives). In October 1979, Abdul Fattah secured the 1979 Treaty of Friendship and Cooperation with the USSR. Similar treaties with East Germany and Ethiopia followed in 1981, following Abdul Fattah's resignation from office.

In 1980, he resigned from all his posts for allegedly health reasons and was succeeded by Ali Nasir Muhammad. However, Abdul Fattah was appointed president of the party before he went to Moscow for medical treatment, until 1985, when he returned in the face of a mounting crisis between Muhammad and his opponents in the YSP.

In October 1985, he was elected to the YSP Politburo and as a Secretary of the Central Committee, but the crisis had erupted on 13 January 1986, into a violent struggle in Aden between Ali Nasir's supporters and Abdul Fattah's supporters (See South Yemen civil war). Fighting lasted for more than a month and resulted in thousands of casualties and Ali Nasir's ouster.

== Death ==
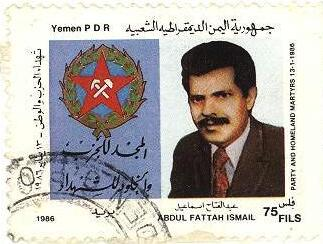
Postage stamp commemorating Abdul Fattah Ismail after the January 13 massacre

During the crisis, Abdul Fattah disappeared. He was last seen being evacuated from the YSP office along with his deputy Ali Salem al-Beidh in a military armored vehicle. Unsubstantiated reports claim he was killed when naval forces loyal to Ali Nasir shelled his home in Aden, but his ultimate fate is unknown. His body was never found.

== See also ==
- Russian Translation

Political offices
Preceded by Post Established	Chairman of the Presidium of Supreme People's Council (South Yemen); 1970–1980	Succeeded by Ali Nasir Muhammad
Preceded by Post Established	General Secretary of the Yemeni Socialist Party; 1978–1980	Succeeded by Ali Nasir Muhammad
