= Qahtan al-Shaabi =

First President of South Yemen from 1967 to 1969

Qahtan Muhammad al-Shaabi
- قحطان محمد الشعبي
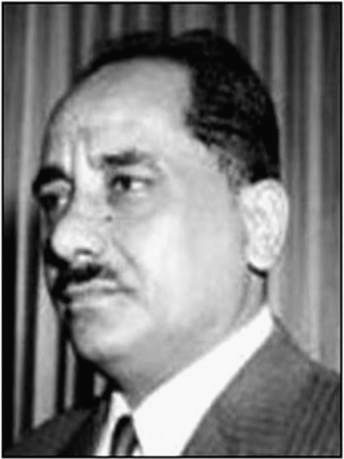
- Al-Shaabi in the 1960s

1st President of South Yemen
- In office 30 November 1967 – 22 June 1969
- Preceded by: Position established
- Succeeded by: Salim Rubaya Ali

Secretary-General of the National Liberation Front
- In office 19 August 1963 – 22 June 1969
- Preceded by: Position established
- Succeeded by: Abdul Fattah Ismail

Personal details
- Born: 1920 Lahij, Sultanate of Lahej, Aden Protectorate
- Died: 7 July 1981 (aged 61)
- Party: National Liberation Front
- Spouse: Zainab al-Shaabi
- Relations: Sa'id al-Shaabi (brother); Maryam al-Shaabi (sister); Sheik Abd al-Latif Abd al-Qawi al-Shaabi (uncle); Faysal al-Shaabi (cousin and brother-in-law)
- Children: Najib; Nasser; Amal; Nabil
- Parent: Muhammad Abd al-Qawi al-Shaabi

Qahtan Muhammad al-Shaabi (Arabic: قحطان محمد الشعبي; 1920 – 7 July 1981) was the first President of the People's Republic of South Yemen. Al-Shaabi's National Liberation Front (NLF) political organisation wrested control of the country from the British and won political supremacy over the opposition Front for the Liberation of Occupied South Yemen (FLOSY) in 1967. On 30 November 1967, the Protectorate of South Arabia was declared independent as the People's Republic of South Yemen, with al-Shaabi as President. Al-Shaabi held the presidency until 22 June 1969, when a hard-line Marxist group from within his own NLF seized control. He was replaced by Salim Rubai Ali and jailed, then placed under house arrest until the 1970s, and lived quietly in Aden from his release until his death in 1981.

== Background ==
Al-Shaabi was originally an agricultural officer from Lahej who fled to Cairo in 1958. In 1962, he was announced the head of a National Liberation Army, formed in Egypt, and in 1963 or 1965, he was chosen the founding head of the NLF. Upon independence in 1967, he was the best-known NLF leader and the only one over 40 years old. As part of the Nasserist nationalist right-leaning faction of the NLF, he fought the Marxist left wing for a year and a half until his ouster in the 22 June Corrective Move, also known as the Glorious Corrective Move, in 1969. The government declared in 1990 that the deposition was "in the absence of true democracy".

Preceded by (none)	President of South Yemen; 1967–1969	Succeeded by Salim Rubai Ali
