= Ali Nasir Muhammad =

Leader of South Yemen from 1980 to 1986

al-Rafīq Ali Nasir Muhammad
- علي ناصر محمد
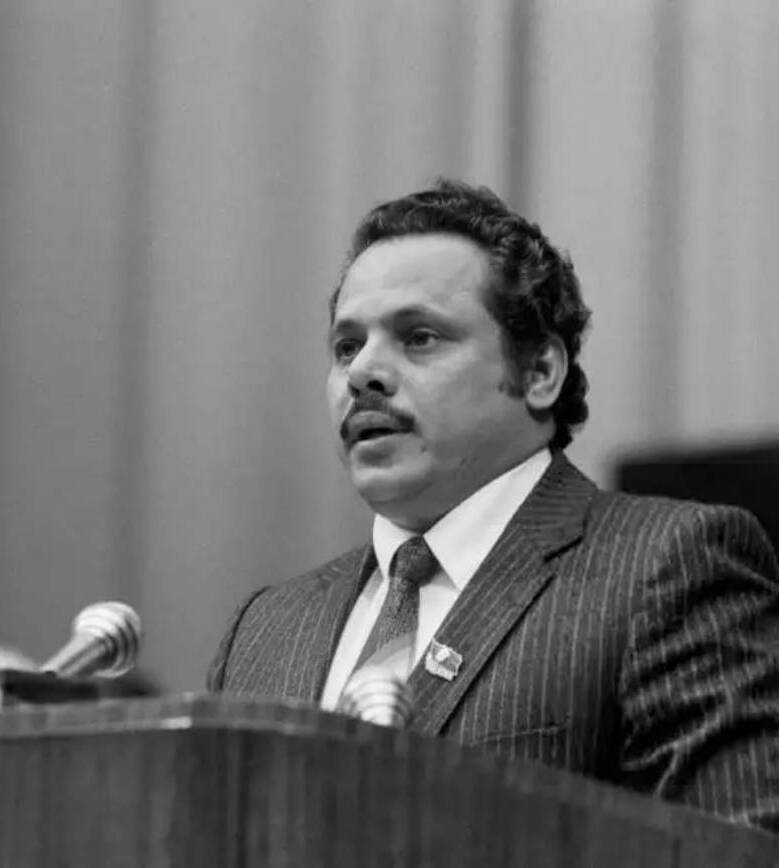
- Muhammad in 1982

2nd General Secretary of the Yemeni Socialist Party
- In office 21 April 1980 – 24 January 1986
- Preceded by: Abdul Fattah Ismail
- Succeeded by: Ali Salem al-Beidh

Chairman of the Presidium of Supreme People's Council
- In office 21 April 1980 – 24 January 1986
- Preceded by: Abdul Fattah Ismail
- Succeeded by: Haidar Abu Bakr al-Attas

Chairman of the Presidential Council
- In office 26 June 1978 – 27 December 1978; Acting: 26 June 1978 – 1 July 1978
- Preceded by: Salim Rubai Ali
- Succeeded by: Abdul Fattah Ismail (As Chairman of the presidium of Supreme People's Council)

Prime Minister of South Yemen
- In office 2 August 1971 – 14 February 1985
- Preceded by: Muhammad Ali Haitham
- Succeeded by: Haidar Abu Bakr al-Attas

Personal details
- Born: 31 December 1939 (age 86) Mudiyah, Dathina Confederation, Aden Protectorate
- Party: Yemeni Socialist Party
- Other political affiliations: National Liberation Front
- Awards: Order of Friendship of Peoples; Order of José Martí
- Website: https://www.alinaser.com/

Ali Nasir Muhammad Al-Husani (Arabic: علي ناصر محمد; born 31 December 1939) is a Yemeni politician who also served as the Secretary-General of the Yemeni Socialist Party between 1980 and 1986. He was president of South Yemen twice and once the Prime Minister. He served as the Prime Minister from 2 August 1971 until 14 February 1985 and as Chairman of the Presidential Council from 26 June 1978, after the ouster and execution of Salim Rubai Ali, until 27 December 1978.

== Biography ==
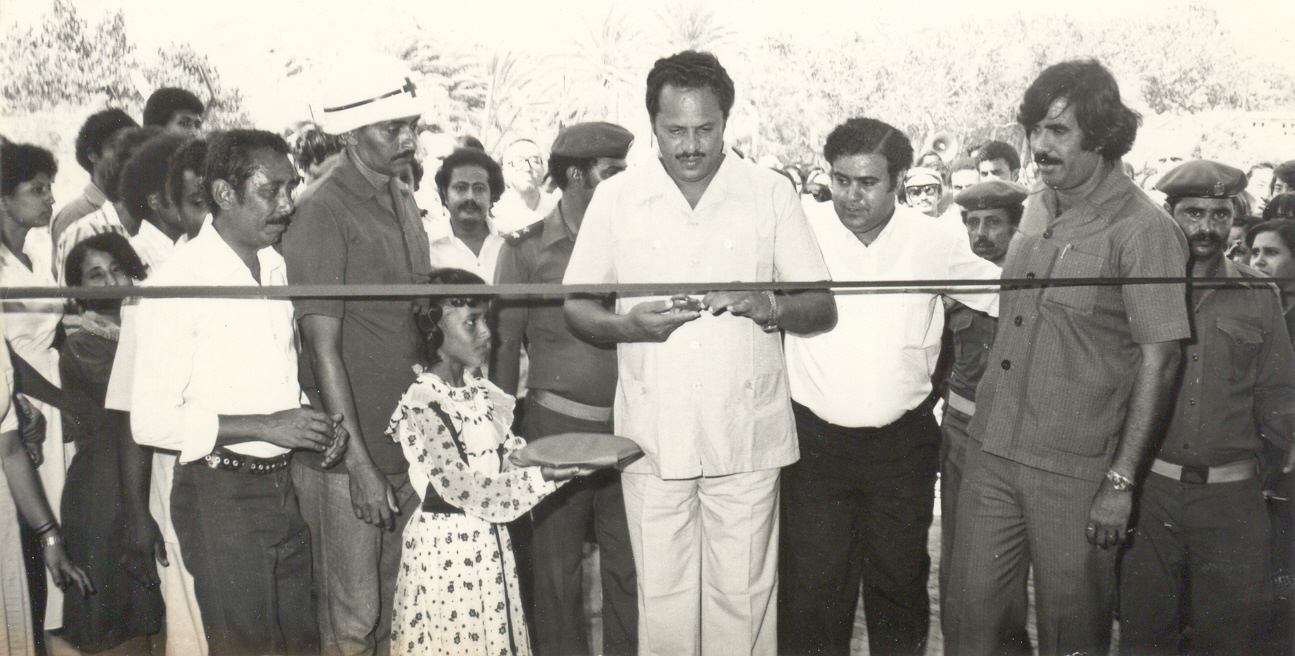
Ali Nasir during an opening ceremony

In April 1980, South Yemeni president Abdul Fattah Ismail resigned, officially for health reasons, and moved to Moscow. His successor was Ali Nasir Muhammad, who was generally seen as a more pragmatic and moderate leader than his predecessor. Mohammad was less committed to Marxist-Leninist ideology than Ismail and relaxed various socialist policies in the PDRY. His rule was also marked by his moderate approach towards foreign affairs, as evidenced by his less interventionist stance towards both North Yemen and neighbouring Oman and attempts to improve relations with the West. On January 13, 1986, a violent struggle began in Aden between Ali Nasir's supporters and supporters of the returned Ismail, the South Yemen Civil War. The fighting lasted for more than a month and resulted in thousands of casualties, Ali Nasir's ouster, and Ismail's death. Ali Nasir's term lasted from 21 April 1980 to 24 January 1986. Some 60,000 people, including the deposed Ali Nasir, fled to North Yemen. He was succeeded by Haidar Abu Bakr al-Attas.

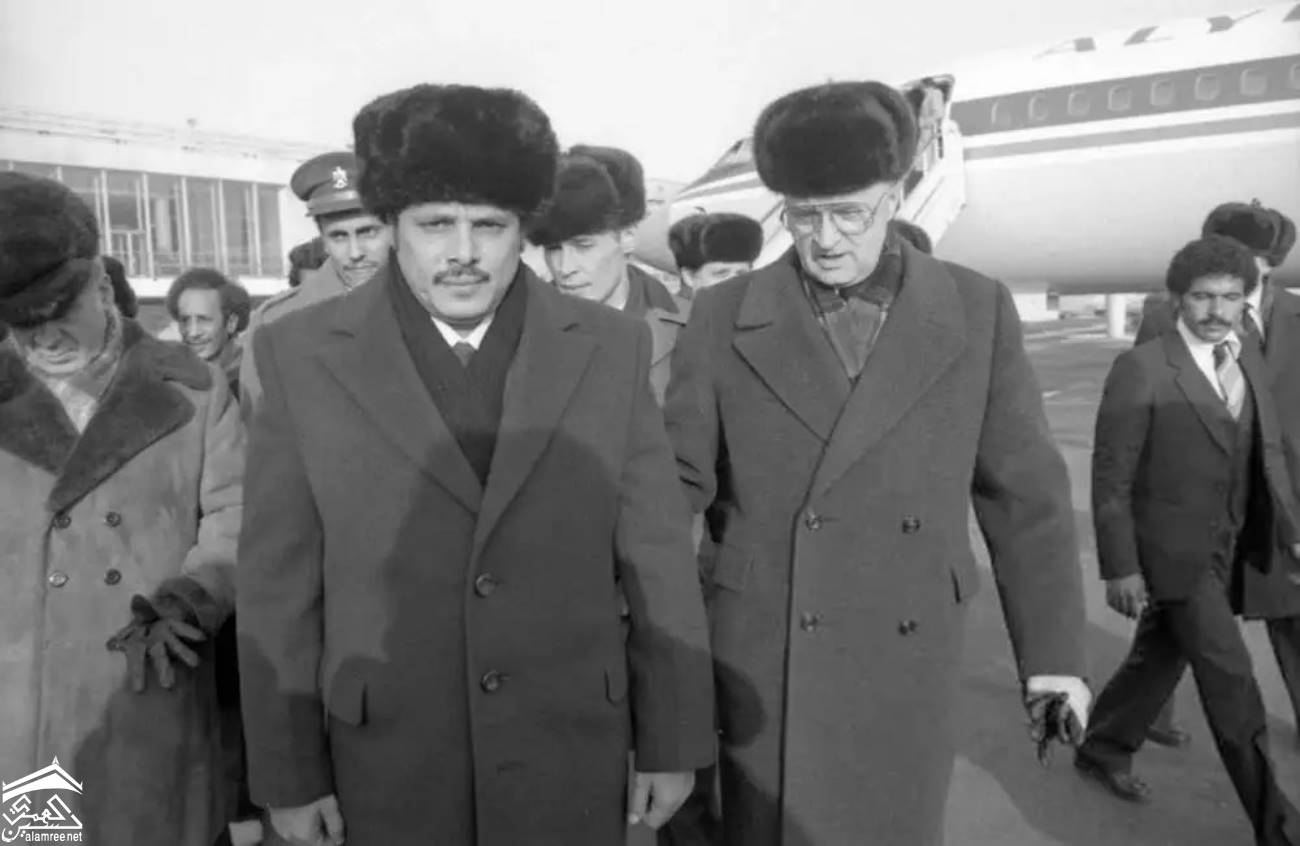
Ali Nasir Muhammad's visit to the Soviet Union in 1984

Ali Nasir was a member of the National Front, ar. الجبهة القومية (NF) as well as the Yemeni Socialist Party (YSP - الحزب الاشتراكي اليمني) after the YSP was formed from the UPONF in October 1978. During the 1994 Civil War in Yemen, he pushed his supporters to operate alongside the forces of Sana'a government and against the recently re-established Democratic Republic of Yemen, seeking revenge for his ouster. The southern secession was repressed in July 1994 after the surrender of Aden and Mukalla strongholds.

The former president became an opposition figure in the 2011 Yemeni uprising, being named to a 17-member transitional council intended by some anti-government factions to govern Yemen during a prospective transition from the authoritarian regime led by President Ali Abdullah Saleh to a plural democracy. This council was opposed by the Joint Meeting Parties, the main opposition coalition, which also supported Saleh's removal from power and a transition to democracy.

In February 2015, there were media reports that Muhammad was being considered as a prospective interim leader of a "presidential council" after the collapse of the government.

== Bibliography ==
A list of books made by Ali Nasser:

- "Aden: history and civilization", 04/02/2003
- "Train journey to the west", 07/06/2018
- "The road to Aden", 01/03/2019
- "Two-millennial talk", 05/16/2023
- "Memory of a homeland":
  - Vol. 1, 01/06/2019
  - Vol. 2, 01/03/2020
  - Vol. 3, 30/11/2020
  - Vol. 4, 28/10/2020
  - Vol. 5, 04/01/2023
- Gardens of the Immortals, 01/06/2022

== See also ==
- "Russian Translation" (2006) – Russian TV political detective serial: the first four scenes are giving the fictionalised version of Aden 1986 civil war between Ali Nasir Muhammad and the opposition in YSP.

Political offices
Preceded by Muhammad Ali Haitham	Prime Minister of South Yemen; 1971–1985	Succeeded by Haidar Abu Bakr al-Attas
Preceded by Salim Rubai Ali	Chairman of the Presidential Council (South Yemen); 1978	Succeeded by Abdul Fattah Ismail
Preceded by Abdul Fattah Ismail	Chairman of the Presidium of Supreme People's Council (South Yemen); 1980–1986	Succeeded by Haidar Abu Bakr al-Attas
Preceded by Abdul Fattah Ismail	General Secretary of the Yemeni Socialist Party; 1980–1986	Succeeded by Ali Salem al-Beidh
