= Helen Lackner =

Writer and academic

Helen Lackner is a writer, academic and researcher mostly known for her work on the Middle East and Yemen in particular.

She is the author among other books of Yemen in Crisis, which won the Cameroonian Grand Prix of Literary Associations 2018, Research Category.,

== Biography ==
Helen Lackner studied at SOAS and the London School of Economics (LSE).

who is often introduced as an independent investigator, is currently a Research Associate at the London Middle East Institute SOAS. She has been researching Yemen since the 1970s, and lived there in various parts of the country for more than 15 years.

She is fluent in English, French, and Arabic.

== Publications ==
- Why Yemen Matters. A Society in Transition. (Saqi, 2014)
- Yemen’s Peaceful Transition from Autocracy: could it have succeeded? (International IDEA 2016)
- Understanding the Yemeni Crisis: the transformation of tribal roles in recent decades (Durham, Luce Fellowship Paper 17, 2016)
- Yemen in Crisis: autocracy, neo-liberalism and the disintegration of a state (Saqi, 2017)

== Awards and honours ==
- Grand Prix of Literary Associations 2018, Research Category, for Yemen in Crisis
