= National Liberation Front (South Yemen) =

1963–1978 paramilitary and political party

National Liberation Front; (1963–1967); National Front; (1967–1975); Unified Political Organization of the National Front; (1975–1978)
- General Secretary: 1967–1969: Qahtan Muhammad al-Shaabi; 1969–1978: Abdul Fattah Ismail
- Governing body: General Command
- Founded: 19 August 1963; 63 years ago
- Dissolved: 13 October 1978; 47 years ago
- Succeeded by: Yemeni Socialist Party
- Headquarters: Aden, South Yemen
- Military wing: Liberation Army; Popular Guard
- Ideology: Communism; Marxism–Leninism; Scientific socialism Anti-imperialism; Anticolonialism; Yemeni unification 1965–1969; South Yemeni nationalism Economic progressivism Factions: Ba'athism; Nasserist wing: Nasserism; Social democracy Arab nationalism Leftist wing: Maoism; Stalinism
- Political position: 1965–1969; Left-wing; Leftist wing: Far-left

Party flag

Liberation Army
- جيش التحرير
- Leader: Qahtan Muhammad al-Shaabi
- Dates active: 1963–1967
- Headquarters: Taiz, North Yemen
- Active regions: Federation of South Arabia; Protectorate of South Arabia; Aden Protectorate
- Ideology: Yemeni nationalism Nasserism; Anti-imperialism; Faction: Marxism–Leninism
- Political position: Left-wing
- Wars: Aden Emergency

The National Liberation Front, (Note: NLF, (1965–1967); Arabic: الجبهة القومية للتحرير, romanized: al-jabhat al-qawmiyya lil-taḥrīr) known after the independence of South Yemen as the National Front (Note: NF; Arabic: الجبهة القومية, romanized: al-jabhat al-qawmiyya) from 1967–1975, and from 1975–1978 as the Unified Political Organization of the National Front, was a political party operating in South Yemen and the Federation of South Arabia during the Aden Emergency. During the North Yemen Civil War, fighting spilled over into South Yemen as the British attempted to establish an autonomous colony known as the Federation of South Arabia. Following the exit of the British armed forces, the NLF seized power from its rival, the Arab nationalist Front for the Liberation of Occupied South Yemen (FLOSY). In the aftermath of the Emergency, the NLF renamed itself the National Front and eventually became the main force behind the creation of the Yemeni Socialist Party, which subsequently governed the country as a single-party Marxist–Leninist state.

== History ==
=== Background ===
In the late 1950s, Egyptian president Gamal Abdel Nasser's pan-Arabism had spread to the region and threatened Britain and the traditional Sultans of the region's control. In response the British were able to convince the feuding Emirs to merge into the Federation of South Arabia. In the Federation the Aden Trade Union Congress had a large influence in the new assembly and, to prevent it seizing control of the Federation, the Colony of Aden joined the Federation in 1962 so that Aden's pro-British assembly members could counter the ATUC's influence. The day after Aden joined the Federation, Muhammad al-Badr of the Yemeni monarchy was overthrown and civil war ensued between Nasser backed Republicans and Royalists backed by the Saudi Arabia and the United Kingdom. This conflict spread throughout the region, becoming what the British would term as the Aden Emergency which officially began when a state of emergency was declared in the State of Aden.

=== Creation ===
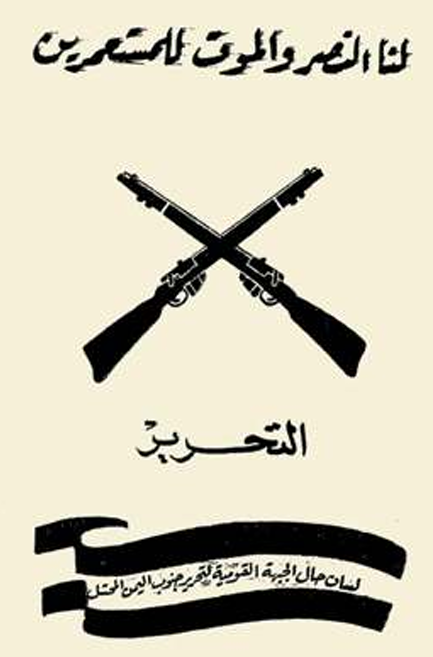
NLF's newspaper cover: "Victory is ours and death for the colonizers!"

The anti-Royalist campaign for power spread to the Federation of South Arabia in 1964 when the NLF announced the start of their revolution. In 1964, there was a new British government headed by the Labour Party after they won the United Kingdom general election. They attempted to grant independence to the Federation of South Arabia by giving Abdullah al Asnag's FLOSY control of the country. This proposal was annulled by the American President Johnson who did not want Britain to withdraw while the Americans were escalating the Vietnam War.

In 1965, the British suspended the Federation of South Arabia's government and imposed direct colonial rule. Realizing that the British were not going to give him control, Asnag fled the country and joined the NLF. However elements of the NLF become more radical Marxist and they split from the Egyptians. Asnag formed his own military organization, FLOSY, in order to counter the NLF. The NLF quickly denounced Asnag and FLOSY as Imperialist forces under control of Nasser and in addition to attacking the British also engaged FLOSY in combat. By February 1967 Britain could no longer control or protect its bases in Aden and announced it was leaving the country, against American wishes.

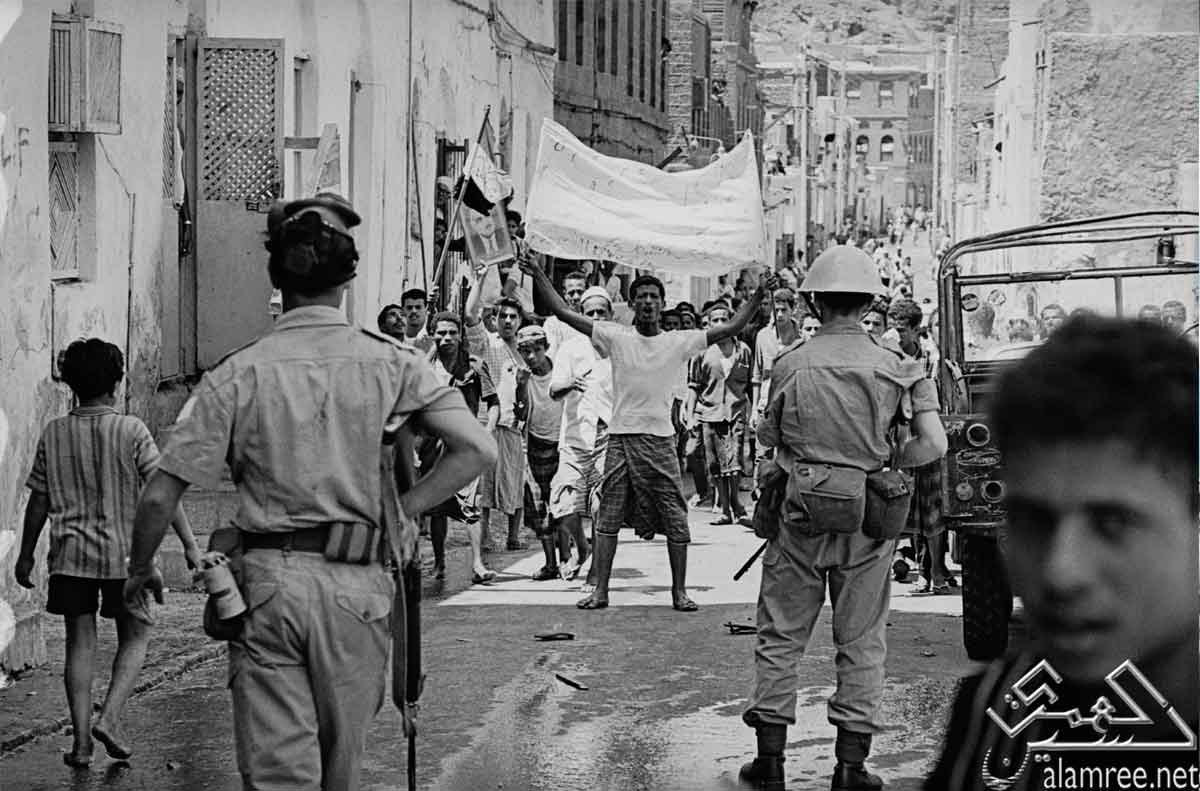
NLF supporters facing British troops in Tawahi, 1967

In January 1967, there were mass riots by NLF and FLOSY supporters in the old Arab quarter of Aden town, which continued until mid February, despite the intervention of British troops. During the period there were many attacks on the troops, and an Aden Airways Douglas DC-3 plane was destroyed in the air with no survivors. At the same time, the members of FLOSY and the NLF were also killing each other in large numbers. On 20 June 1967, there was a mutiny in the Federation of South Arabia Army, which also spread to the police. Order was restored by the British, mainly due to the efforts of the 1st Battalion Argyll and Sutherland Highlanders, under the command of Lt-Col. Colin Campbell Mitchell.

Nevertheless, deadly guerrilla attacks particularly by the NLF soon resumed against British forces. Nasser threw its weight behind FLOSY and arrested the head of the NLF who was living at the time in Egypt. Officially FLOSY and the NLF refused to talk to the leaving British forces as they didn't want to be seen associated with the British government. However unofficial secret talks were held between the British and the NLF who conspired to defeat FLOSY so that the much hated Nasser supported FLOSY would be defeated. With the British withdrawing from Aden by the end of November 1967, earlier than had been planned by British Prime Minister Harold Wilson and without an agreement on the succeeding governance. When the last Governor of Aden, Sir Humphrey Trevelyan, left the country he had no one to give the keys to but as a point of respect had the Government House repainted for whoever emerged victorious.

=== Independence ===
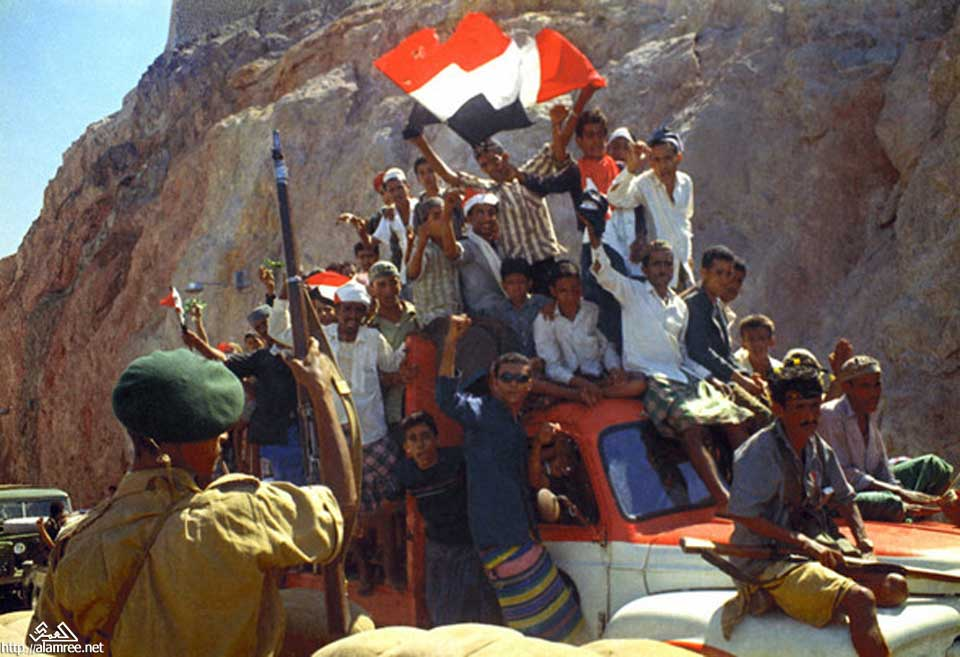
NLF supporters waving their flags as part of the celebrations and mass marches on 29 and 30 November 1967

On 30 November 1967, the Federation of South Arabia ceased to exist when the People's Republic of Southern Yemen was proclaimed. In 1967, Israel defeated Egypt in the Six-Day War thus obliging Egypt to evacuate its troops from Yemen. FLOSY, now without any military support from its Egyptian ally, continued fighting the NLF. However FLOSY's fate was sealed when the NLF managed to persuade the Yemen's Federal army to join the fight against FLOSY. On November 7, 1967 FLOSY tried to attack a federal army base but the army defeated FLOSY with the NLF's help, inflicting heavy losses on FLOSY. After the defeat FLOSY´s fighting force disbanded although some cadres and leaders remained outside the country. Most of the opposing leaders reconciled by 1968, in the aftermath of a final royalist siege of San'a'a.

=== Left-wing shift ===
Qahtan Muhammad al-Shaabi held the presidency until 22 June 1969, when a hard-line Marxist group from within his own NLF seized control. Salim Rubai Ali (Salmin) replaced al-Shaabi as country leader. After the civil war in 1970, Saudi Arabia recognized the Yemen Arab Republic and a ceasefire against remaining belligerents was put in place. The NLF changed the name of South Yemen on 1 December 1970 to the People's Democratic Republic of Yemen (PDRY).

=== Transformation into the Socialist Party ===
The NLF changed its name to the Yemeni Socialist Party (YSP) in 1978. All other political parties were amalgamated into the Yemeni Socialist Party (YSP), which became the only legal party.
