= General Secretary of the Yemeni Socialist Party =

- الأمين العام للحزب الاشتراكي اليمني
- Incumbent; Abdulrahman Al-Saqqaf since 19 December 2014
- Formation: 13 October 1978; 48 years ago
- First holder: Abdul Fattah Ismail
- Final holder: Abdulrahman Al-Saqqaf

The People's Democratic Republic of Yemen became independent as the "People's Republic of Southern Yemen" in November 1967, after the British withdrawal from the Federation of South Arabia and the Protectorate of South Arabia. In May 1990, South Yemen unified with the Yemen Arab Republic (commonly referred to as North Yemen) to form the united Republic of Yemen. During the May–July 1994 Civil War, South Yemen seceded from the united Yemen and established the short-lived Democratic Republic of Yemen.

== Officeholders ==
General Secretary of the Central Committee of the Yemeni Socialist Party
No.	Officeholder		Took office	Left office	Length of tenure	Term	Birth	PM	Death	Ref.
1		Abdul Fattah Ismail (عبد الفتاح إسماعيل)	13 October 1978	20 April 1980	1 year, 190 days	1st (1978–1980)	1939	1978	1986	
2		Ali Nasir Muhammad (علي ناصر محمد)	21 April 1980	24 January 1986	5 years, 278 days	1st–2nd (1978–1986)	1939	1978	Alive	
3		Ali Salem al-Beidh (علي سالم البيض)	6 February 1986	7 July 1994	8 years, 151 days	3rd (1986–1998)	1939	1978	2026	
4	—	Ali Saleh Obad (علي صالح عباد)	September 1994	31 July 2005	10 years, 333 days	3rd–4th (1986–2005)	1942	1978	2019	
5		Yasin Said Numan (ياسين سعيد نعمان)	31 July 2005	19 December 2014	9 years, 141 days	5th (2005–present)	1947	1978	Alive	
6	—	Abdulrahman Al-Saqqaf (عبد الرحمن السقاف)	19 December 2014	Incumbent	11 years, 323 days	5th (2005–present)	1956	?	Alive	

== Predecessors ==
=== National Liberation Front (1963–1975) ===
General Secretary of the Central Committee of the National Liberation Front
No.	Officeholder	Took office	Left office	Length of tenure	Term	Birth	PM	Death	Ref.
1	Qahtan al-Shaabi (قحطان محمد الشعبي)	19 August 1963	22 June 1969	5 years, 307 days	1st–4th (1965–1969)	1920	1963	1981	
2	Abdul Fattah Ismail (عبد الفتاح إسماعيل)	22 June 1969	14 October 1975	6 years, 114 days	4th–5th (1969–1975)	1939	1963	1986	

=== People's Democratic Union (1961–1975) ===
General Secretary of the Central Committee of the People's Democratic Union
No.	Officeholder	Took office	Left office	Length of tenure	Term	Birth	PM	Death	Ref.
1	Abdullah Badheeb (عبد الله باذيب)	22 October 1961	14 October 1975	13 years, 357 days	1st–2nd (1961–1975)	1931	1961	1976	

=== People's Vanguard Party (1974–1975) ===
General Secretary of the Central Committee of the People's Vanguard Party
No.	Officeholder	Took office	Left office	Length of tenure	Birth	PM	Death	Ref.
1	Anis Hasan Yahya (أنيس_حسن_يحيى)	April 1974	14 October 1975	1 year, 196 days	1934	1974	2026	

=== Unified Nationalist Front Political Organization (1975–1978) ===
General Secretary of the Central Committee of the Unified Nationalist Front Political Organization
No.	Officeholder	Took office	Left office	Length of tenure	Term	Birth	PM	Death	Ref.
1	Abdul Fattah Ismail (عبد الفتاح إسماعيل)	14 October 1975	13 October 1978	2 years, 364 days	6th–7th (1975–1978)	1939	1963	1986	

== See also ==
- President of South Yemen
- Prime Minister of South Yemen
