= 1986 South Yemeni parliamentary election =

← 1978	28–30 October 1986	1993 →
- All 111 seats in the Supreme People's Council; 56 seats needed for a majority
- Turnout: 88.78%
Party	Leader	Seats	+/–
YSP	Haidar al-Attas	71	−40
Independents	–	40	New
This lists parties that won seats. See the complete results below.
Prime Minister before	Prime Minister after
Haidar al-Attas; YSP	Haidar al-Attas; YSP

Parliamentary elections were held in South Yemen between 28 and 30 October 1986, having originally been scheduled for 1983, but later postponed. A total of 181 candidates contested the 111 seats of the Supreme People's Council. Although the country was a one-party state at the time, with the Yemeni Socialist Party as the sole legal party, independents were also able to run as candidates.

The result was a victory for the Socialist Party, which won 71 seats. Voter turnout was reported to be 89%.

== Electoral system ==
The 111 members of the Supreme People's Council were elected by plurality in eighty constituencies, with voters having the same number of votes as the number of seats available in their constituency.

== Results ==
Party	Votes	%	Seats	+/–
Yemeni Socialist Party			71	–40
Independents			40	New
Total			111	0
Total votes	725,568	–		
Registered voters/turnout	817,253	88.78		
Source: IPU
