= Abdurrahman Ali Al-Jifri =

Yemeni opposition leader

Sayyid Abdurrahman Ali al-Jifri (born in November 1943) is a Yemeni opposition leader. He was the vice-president of the Presidency Council of the short-lived Government of the Democratic Republic of Yemen that was established on May 21, 1994. He was also the President of the National Opposition Front (MOWJ), the opposition group that fought and lost the brief war of secession against the Republic of Yemen in 1994. As of 2013 he was the Chairman of MOWJ, comprising the group of former socialist leaders who fled the country in 1994.

== Education ==
Born in Yeshbum, Shabwa, Abdurrahman learned the Qur'an at his father's school in Yeshbum. He had his primary and intermediate stage education at the Al-Abdaleyah Al-Muhseniah school in Lahej, and his secondary-stage {high school} education at the Halwan school in Cairo, Egypt. After completion, he spent two years at the Faculty of Science in Cairo University and was awarded the Bachelor of Science (Military Science) in February 1965 by the military college. He was the first among the foreign students to pass the college study.

In 1964, Abdurrahman was granted the "Culture Award" for his thesis on the Positive Neutrality and Non-Alliance Policy which was published in the Magazine of the Armed Forces of U.A.R., the same year. He subsequently pursued a course in military engineering at the Al-Taif Military Engineering School and from 1973 to 1975, studied English language, computer programming, and business administration in London.

== Political activities ==
=== Early political life ===
In 1956, at the age of 13, Abdurrahman joined the Rabitat Party Youth, and was one of the pioneers in founding the Youth Organization of the Afro-Asian Peoples Solidarity. Rabitat abna al-Yaman (RAY) was one of the country's oldest but smaller opposition parties.

Abdurrahman represented the youth organization in celebrating the first anniversary of the United Arab Republic (U.A.R.) in 1959 when he was 16. In a carnival on February 2, which was attended by more than a hundred thousand people in Republic Square in Cairo, he delivered a speech on behalf of the youth organization.

In 1965 two rival nationalist groups — the Front for the Liberation of Occupied South Yemen (FLOSY) and the National Liberation Front (NLF) — turned to terrorism in their struggle to control the country. Abdurrahman participated in the struggle against the British-sponsored Federation of South Arabia. In the face of uncontrollable violence, British troops withdrew, and the federation rule collapsed. The NLF elements quickly took control, after eliminating their FLOSY rivals. Abdurrahman was forced to emigrate together with others from his homeland. By 1968, following a final royalist siege of Sanaa, most of the opposing leaders reached a reconciliation and returned to their homeland.

In 1970 Abdurrahman was involved in the National Unity movement which was then newly formed in Sanaa. The National Unity was a coalition that included the League Party, the Liberation Front, the Front for the Liberation of Occupied South Yemen (FLOSY) and the secessionists from the National Liberation Front (NLF).

After completing his course in London, Abdurrahman worked as a General Manager for a number of investment companies in the Gulf. In November 1986, he was elected President of the League Party by the Party's Seventh General Conference. He was again re-elected President in 1992 by the Eighth General Conference in Sanaa and was chairman of the Perpetratory Commission for the National Conference.

=== Formation of the National Opposition Front (MOWJ) ===
Abdurrahman represented the League Party in founding the National Opposition Front (MOWJ) which was the most successful opposition alliance in the Yemeni political arena. He represented the Party in the Dialogue Commission, which was the direct outcome of the Front's pressure against the ruling government. He drafted the broad outlines and foundations of the Document of Pledge and Accord and presented the document in the name of the League's Rabitat Party to the National Opposition Front in October 1993. The National Opposition Front presented the document to the Dialogue Commission in Sanaa on December 18, 1993.

Conflicts within the coalition resulted in the self-imposed exile of Vice-president Ali Salem al-Beidh to Aden in August 1993, and a deterioration in the general security situation as political rivals settled scores and tribal elements took advantage of the unsettled situation. Haidar Abu Bakr al-Attas (former southern Prime Minister) continued to serve as the Prime Minister of the Republic of Yemen, but his government was ineffective due to political infighting. Continuous negotiations between northern and southern leaders resulted in the signing of the document of pledge and accord in Amman, Jordan on February 20, 1994.

Abdurrahman signed the Document of Pledge and Accord in his capacity as a member. Jointly with the late Omer AlGawy, however, he expressed his reservations on the implementation mechanism. He forewarned the government against using the document as "an Othman's bloody shirt". With co-members of the Dialogue Commission, he contributed in endeavours to pacify the situation after the distressful "events of Emran". Despite this, clashes intensified until civil war broke out in early May 1994.

=== Civil War ===
Southern leaders, supported by the Saudis, declared secession and the establishment of the Democratic Republic of Yemen (DRY) on May 21, 1994, but the Democratic Republic of Yemen was not recognized by the international community. Although the southerners had their own motives for fighting, northern leaders have long maintained that the Saudis supported the southern cause as a way of furthering their own border dispute with the Republic of Yemen. Ali Nasir Muhammad's supporters greatly assisted military operations against the secessionists and Aden was captured on July 7, 1994. Other resistance quickly collapsed and thousands of southern leaders and military went into exile.

When the war broke out, Abdurrahman was in Aden, together with his friend, the late Omer Al-Gawy. He quickly drafted the initiative of the National Opposition Front on May 9, 1994, to stop the war. He participated in the Government of the Democratic Republic of Yemen as a Vice-President of the Presidency Council whence he declared that the objective was to put an end to the war and to restore the Yemeni unification on valid foundation that will help achieve stability and security in accordance with the document which enjoyed the consensus of the Yemeni populace and all its political and social forces. Among the principal leaders, he was the last to leave Aden, staying behind until July 7, 1994, to prevent bloodshed and to save it from being demolished.

After losing the war, leaders of the opposition front fled to several Arab countries and lived in exile. MOWJ set up its headquarters in London, where — despite retreating from its separatist line — it waged a propaganda campaign against the Sanaa government. In January 1995, Abdurrahman was elected as President of MOWJ.

=== Life after the Civil War ===
In 1997, Abdurrahman participated in the "Human Rights Conference" held at Chatham House in London and in October, he delivered a speech on the Yemeni issue at Exeter University, which printed his speech.

Studies were published about him, the first of which was by Mr. Awad AlArashani of the "Al-Ahram Printing Press", entitled, Abdurrahman al-Jifri: Confrontation and Challenge and another by "ALQUDS for Studies and Research", entitled, A Reading in the Thinking of Abdurrahman al-Jifri, the President of Mowj.

== Political writings ==
Abdurrahman Ali wrote and contributed in compiling several of the League's literature, some of which were as follows:

1. A True Vision on the Unity Issue (1987)
2. The Reality and the Alternative (1987): A Confutation of the Outlook of Jarallah Omar (1989)
3. Struggle Facts and Attitudes
4. The Party of Truth and Originality
5. Yemen! Where to?
6. The Rotes and The solution, which was presented at the London Conference in September 1995; the conference, initiated and sponsored by the University of London, was attended by several political leaders of the Yemeni Opposition
7. A Perspective for Uniting the Efforts of the Yemeni Opposition
8. Path of the People and a Charismatic Leader (1980), a book on one of the most prominent founders of the National Movement, Sayyid Muhammad Ali al-Jifri
