= Popular Democratic Union (Yemen) =

People's Democratic Union اتحاد الشعب الديمقراطي
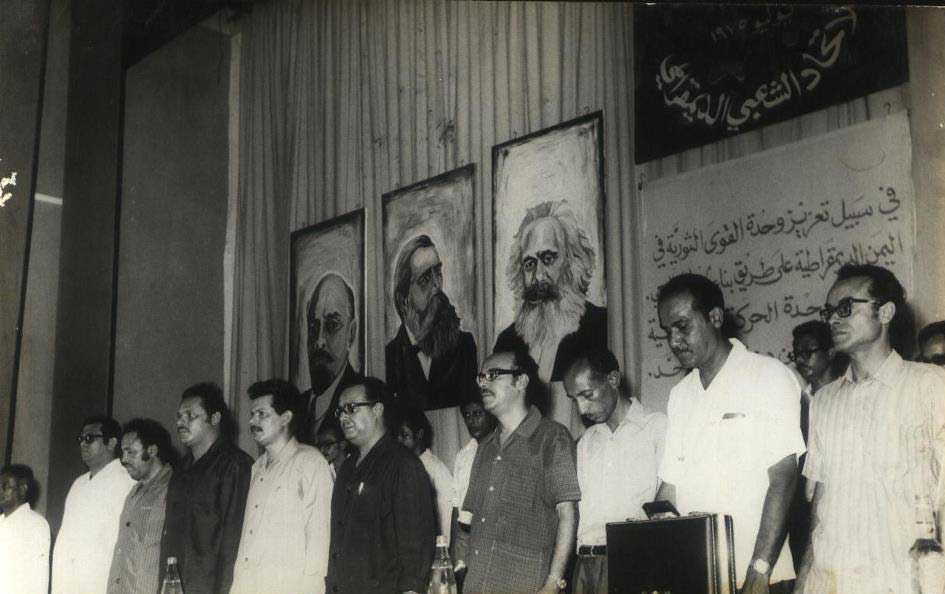
- Leader: Abdullah Badheeb; Ali Badheeb
- Founded: 22 October 1961
- Dissolved: October 1975 (merged into UPONF)
- Succeeded by: Unified Political Organization of the National Front (1975–1978); Yemeni Socialist Party (1978)
- Youth wing: United Organisation of Yemeni Youth (Shabiba)
- Ideology: Marxism; Scientific socialism Yemeni nationalism Pan-Arabism; Anti-colonialism; Anti-Nasserism
- Political position: Far-left
- Slogan: "For a United Democratic Yemen"

The Popular Democratic Union (Arabic: اتحاد الشعب الديمقراطي, romanized: Ittiḥād al-Sha‘b al-Dīmuqrāṭiyy; PDU) was a Marxist political organization in South Yemen. Formally established in October 1961 in the Aden Colony under the leadership of writer and journalist Abdullah Badheeb, the party was the oldest communist party in Yemen and the Arabian Peninsula.

Despite its small size, with a total membership less than 500, the PDU exercised significant long-term influence over South Yemeni politics by forming an ideological symbiosis with the National Front (NF) and playing a role in founding the Unified Political Organization of the National Front and later the Yemeni Socialist Party (YSP).

== Background ==
Marxist ideas first appeared in the Aden Colony in the first half of the 1950s, amid the broader expansion of Arab communist parties, the rise of the Soviet Union, and the gradual decline of British colonial authority. Between 1953 and 1956, a circle of revolutionary intellectuals, primarily writers and journalists led by Abdullah Badheeb, formed the initial Marxist grouping in Aden. The leadership of the group was centered around three brothers of the Badheeb family, who were originally from the Hadhramaut region. Operating through periodicals such as al-Nahdah, al-Janub al-'Arabi, al-Ba'th, al-Fajr, and al-Fikr, the group introduced Marxist concepts and discussed anti-colonial issues.

To circumvent colonial restrictions on clandestine political activity, the Marxists operated within legal civil associations, joining the South Arabian League (SAL) and helping found cultural groups like the Society of the Lovers of New Literature. By 1958, the grouping had also extended its network into North Yemen. In late 1955, colonial authorities prosecuted Badheeb in Aden Colony's first political trial, charging him with "inciting class hostility" following his article "The New English-Speaking Christ" in al-Nahdah. Between 1956 and 1957, the group expanded its influence within Aden's labor movement, opposing moderate union leaders like Abdullah al-Asnaj. After formally severing ties with the SAL in late 1957, the group operated through the Front of Free Writers until rival nationalist intellectuals formed the National League of Arab Writers to counter Marxist influence.

== History ==
=== Founding and the National Charter ===
Following a period of political legalization by colonial authorities, the group formally constituted itself as the People's Democratic Union at a founding congress on 22 October 1961. Recognizing that the trade union movement was relatively weak and that anti-colonial politics were dominated by Pan-Arab nationalist sentiment, Badheeb concluded that the small Marxist party could not, on its own, win over the masses. Consequently, the PDU chose not to frame itself as an isolated communist party, opting instead to function as part of a broader national-democratic movement to first overthrow colonial rule before pursuing the socialist transformation of the country.

At its founding congress, the party adopted its National Charter under the slogan "For a United Democratic Yemen!" The Charter defined British colonialism as the primary enemy, denounced local sultans as feudal puppets, and rejected British plans for local self-government within the Federation of South Arabia. For North Yemen, it called for overthrowing the autocratic monarchy and establishing a national-democratic regime. Borrowing Soviet political rhetoric, the document denounced opportunism in the labor movement and called for full alignment with the socialist bloc, particularly the Soviet Union.

Throughout its existence, the PDU remained predominantly an urban movement centered in Aden. Although the party viewed itself as the representative of the "poorest and most disenfranchised populations," its actual social base was largely restricted to students and intellectuals, lacking deep roots in the rural, tribal-oriented hinterlands or among the peasantry.

=== Alliance with the NLF ===
Because the PDU lacked the numerical strength to engage in armed guerrilla warfare, it sought an alliance with the National Liberation Front (NLF), which was better positioned to challenge British colonial authority. This alliance was facilitated by the high personal prestige Abdullah Badheeb enjoyed among NLF intellectuals, most notably Abdel Fattah Ismail, the NLF's chief ideologist. To build its constituency, the PDU redirected its organizational efforts toward student mobilization and established a youth wing, the United Organisation of Yemeni Youth (UOYY), also known as Shabiba. Led by Abdullah Abd al-Majid al-Salafi, the youth wing organized adult literacy campaigns in Sheikh Othman, represented Yemeni youth at international socialist forums, and arranged scholarships for Yemeni students to study in the USSR. In 1970, Shabiba was formally absorbed into the ruling party.

Following the 26 September Revolution in North Yemen in 1962, the PDU supported the Yemen Arab Republic and sent volunteers to fight against royalist forces. During the Aden Emergency, the PDU faced hostility from rival nationalist groups such as the local branch of the Movement of Arab Nationalists (MAN) and FLOSY, with MAN leader Qahtan Muhammad al-Shaabi publicly calling for the exclusion of communists from patriotic coalitions.

=== Institutional merger and influence in the YSP ===
In October 1975, the National Front (NF) formally merged with the PDU and the pro-Syrian Ba'athist People's Vanguard Party to form the Unified Political Organization of the National Front (UPONF). Despite its minor organizational size, the PDU secured disproportionate political and administrative power within the new state structure. PDU members gained representation in the legislative Supreme People's Council and assumed control over multiple governmental departments, including the Ministry of Education, the Ministry of Culture, and the Ministry of Information. Abdallah Badheeb held several of these ministerial posts during the 1970s, shaping state propaganda and educational policy until his death in 1976, after which he was succeeded in leadership by his younger brother, Ali Badheeb.

The influence of the PDU reached its peak in October 1978, when UPONF was transformed into the Yemeni Socialist Party (YSP), establishing a vanguard Marxist-Leninist single-party state. Through their close alliance with YSP leader Abdel Fattah Ismail, the former PDU cadre heavily influenced the party's ideological turn toward scientific socialism. Ali Badheeb was appointed to the YSP's eight-member Politburo, served as secretary of the Central Committee's ideology department, and became one of three Deputy Prime Ministers in the Council of Ministers. Furthermore, the former PDU network maintained institutional control over state ideological training by dominating the faculty at the Higher Institute for Scientific Socialism (the Party School) in Aden.

Following the intra-party power struggle in April 1980 that resulted in the ouster of Abdel Fattah Ismail by Ali Nasir Muhammad, the PDU's formal political influence within the YSP leadership declined. Ali Badheeb was removed from the Politburo, though he retained a senior government post. To maintain stable diplomatic and political relations with the Soviet Union, Ali Nasir appointed Abu Bakr Badheeb, Ali's younger brother and advisor, to the Politburo. PDU loyalists continued to control the Soviet-funded Higher Institute for Scientific Socialism, preserving their influence over party cadre education until the eventual collapse of the regime and Yemeni unification.

== Ideology ==
The main ideologies of the People's Democratic Union were Marxism and scientific socialism. The party was the oldest communist party in Yemen and the Arabian Peninsula. The party positioned itself as a vanguard of the working class, students, and disenfranchised populations.

The PDU interpreted the anti-colonial struggle through Marxism, identifying British imperialism and local feudal authorities as the primary impediments to regional development. The PDU adopted a national-democratic strategy, prioritizing national liberation and Yemeni unification over an immediate socialist revolution. The party maintained that the socialist transformation of South Yemen could proceed only after imperial rule was eliminated and a united, democratic Yemeni state was created. The PDU was also pro-Soviet and anti-Nasserist.
