= Ali Salem al-Beidh =

Yemeni politician (1939–2026)

al-Rafīq Ali Salem al-Beidh
- علي سالم البيض
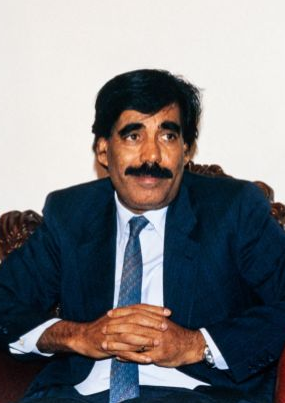
- Portrait of al-Beidh

1st Vice President of Yemen
- In office 22 May 1990 – 6 May 1994
- President: Ali Abdullah Saleh (Chairman of the Presidential Council)
- Prime Minister: Haidar Abu Bakr al-Attas; Muhammad Said al-Attar
- Preceded by: Position created
- Succeeded by: Abdrabbuh Mansour Hadi

General Secretary of the Yemeni Socialist Party
- In office 6 February 1986 – 9 June 1994
- Preceded by: Ali Nasir Muhammad
- Succeeded by: Ali Saleh Obad (Moqbel)

Personal details
- Born: 10 February 1939 Ar Raydah Wa Qusayar, Aden Protectorate (present-day Yemen)
- Died: 17 January 2026 (aged 86) Abu Dhabi, United Arab Emirates
- Party: Yemeni Socialist Party

Ali Salem al-Beidh (Arabic: علي سالم البيض, romanized: ‘Alī Sālim al-Bīḍ; 10 February 1939 – 17 January 2026) was a Yemeni politician who served as the General Secretary of the Yemeni Socialist Party (YSP) in South Yemen and as Vice President of Yemen following the unification in 1990. He left the unification government in 1993, sparking the 1994 civil war in Yemen and then went into exile in Oman. He was a leader of the Southern independence movement known as Al Hirak.

== Early life and education ==
Al-Beidh was born on 10 February 1939 in the village of Ma'bar in Ar Raydah Wa Qusayar district of Hadhramaut. He grew up in a rural tribal environment with little access to education, which he received in traditional schools. After completing primary and intermediate education in the city of Ghayl Ba Wazir, he moved to Aden in 1956 for his secondary education. It was in Aden where Beidh began engaging in political and student activism, becoming the head of the Hadhrami Students Union in 1959. His political life further developed in Egypt, which he traveled to in 1963 to study engineering at Cairo University, while becoming a prominent member of the Yemeni Students Association.

== Leadership in South Yemen ==
At a Hadramaut school in the 1970s

Al-Beidh studied for a Commerce degree and became a School Teacher in Mukalla in 1961. He joined the National Liberation Front in 1963 as the Local Committee founder in Mukalla, and went underground in 1965. In 1966 he was admitted into the Hadramawt Provincial Committee of the NLF. After independence, he joined the YSP. In 1971 he was selected as the General Secretary of the Hadhramawt Provincial Committee and was admitted into the YSP National Central Committee as a Candidate-Member. Selected as Full Member of the Central Committee in 1975, well as Deputy Minister for School Education and Vocational Training. In 1977, he was admitted as Candidate Member for the YSP Politburo and a full Politburo member in 1981. Ali took the top position in the YSP following a 12-day 1986 civil war between forces loyal to former chairman Abdul Fattah Ismail and then-chairman Ali Nasir Muhammad. An Ismail ally, he took control after Muhammad's defeat and defection and Ismail's disappearance. In a coup that took the lives of anywhere from 4,000 to 10,000 people, Ali was one of the few high-ranking officials who survived.

Suffering a loss of more than half its aid from the Soviet Union from 1986 to 1989 and interest in possible oil reserves on the border between the countries, Ali's government worked toward unification with North Yemen officials.

== Unification and civil war ==
Following the unification of South Yemen with the Yemen Arab Republic in 1990, he took up the position of vice-president in the transition government of unified Yemen. But in 1993, Ali quit the government and returned to the former Southern capital of Aden, claiming that the new government was systematically marginalizing the southern people and ignoring the needs of the south. On 21 May 1994, as the South's military position weakened, Ali declared the Democratic Republic of Yemen. He served as the only President of the DRY, from 21 May to 7 July 1994. Ali fled to neighbouring Oman after the secession failed.

== Southern Movement ==
After 15 years of living in exile, al-Beidh resumed his political career on the eve of the 19th anniversary of the Yemeni unification. This came amid highly escalating tensions in the south, with clashes and violence between protesters and Yemeni security forces. In a televised speech from Kitzbühel, Austria, the former president called for a return of South Yemen. Thereafter he called for several demonstrations to demonstrate the strength of the movement. These continued into 2011. As a result of his increased involvement, he lost his right to stay in Oman after violating the conditions of his citizenship. Following the 2011 Yemeni uprising, he renewed calls for reinstating South Yemen as a separate country.

== Death ==
Al-Beidh died in Abu Dhabi, United Arab Emirates on 17 January 2026, at the age of 86.

== See also ==
- South Yemen insurgency
- 2009 speech

Political offices
Preceded by Office created	Deputy Chairman of the Presidential Council of Yemen; 1990–1994	Succeeded by Abd Rabbuh Mansur Hadi as Vice President of Yemen
