= Presidential Council =

Presidential Council may refer to:

- Presidential Council (Benin)
- Presidential Council of the People's Republic of Hungary
- Presidential Council of Iran
- Presidency Council of Iraq
- Presidential Council (Libya)
- Presidential Council (South Yemen)
- Presidential Council of the Soviet Union
- Presidential Council (Turkey)
- Presidential Leadership Council in Yemen, created in 2022
- Andean Presidential Council, part of the Andean Community of Nations
