= Democratic Republic of Yemen =

1994 state in Yemen

Coordinates: 12.8000°N 45.0330°E

Democratic Republic of Yemen جمهورية اليمن الديمقراطية Jumhūriyyat al-Yaman ad-Dīmuqrāṭiyyah
- 21 May 1994–7 July 1994
- Flag
- Status: Partially recognised state
- Capital and largest city: Aden
- Common languages: Arabic
- Government: Republic
- Head of the Presidential Council
  - 1994: Ali Salem al-Beidh
- Prime Minister
  - 1994: Haidar Abu Bakr al-Attas
- Historical era: Yemeni Civil War
  - Established: 21 May 1994
  - Disestablished: 7 July 1994
Preceded by	Succeeded by
Republic of Yemen	Republic of Yemen

The Democratic Republic of Yemen (DRY; Arabic: جمهورية اليمن الديمقراطية Jumhūriyyat al-Yaman ad-Dīmuqrāṭiyyah), was a short-lived state that fought against the Republic of Yemen in the 1994 Yemeni Civil War. It was declared in May 1994 and was intended to be an alternative regime for Yemen. Its capital was Aden.

== History ==
On 21 May 1994, Ali Salem al-Beidh made the following declaration on Aden Radio:

I proclaim the creation of the Democratic Republic of Yemen as an independent state with its capital at Aden.

— Ali Salem al-Beidh

According to al-Beidh, the Democratic Republic of Yemen (DRY) was the "nucleus for a unified Yemen, because it was erected on the firm foundations of the Document of Pledge and Accord, this being a document of national consensus."

Following the declaration of the establishment of the state, the 1994 Summer War broke out, from May till 7 July 1994, between the Yemeni government and the newly established state, which resulted in the deaths of 1,000-7,000 people.

Troops from both sides clashed, with supporters of Ali Nasir Muhammad's faction of the Yemeni Socialist Party supporting Republic of Yemen (ROY) forces and tribes. Islamist parties were hostile to the DRY government.

The war was won by the ROY government, which describes the war as a war of defense of unity, while many people from the southern governorates describe it as a war of occupation, claiming that many lands and properties were seized in favor of officials and tribal sheikhs from the northern governorates.

Ali Abdullah Saleh appointed prime ministers from the south since the end of the war as an attempt to gain southern support.

== Government ==
The head of state of the Democratic Republic of Yemen (DRY) was Ali Salem al-Beidh, who headed a Presidential Council which consisted of Abdal-Qawi Makkawi (the former leader of FLOSY), Abdurrahman Al-Jifri, Sulaiman Nasir Muhammad, and Salim Salih Muhammad. A government was announced on 2 June with Haidar Abu Bakr al-Attas as Prime Minister and Minister of Finance.

Its leaders, in addition to Yemeni Socialist Party (YSP) figures such as al-Beidh and Attas, included members of other South Yemeni and South Arabian groups such as Abdallah al-Asnaj, who was the leader of FLOSY and had been strenuously opposed to the YSP's one-party rule in the former People's Democratic Republic of Yemen.

== See also ==
- People's Democratic Republic of Yemen (PDRY)
- History of Yemen
- South Yemen Movement
