= 1978 South Yemeni parliamentary election =

Parliamentary election in South Yemen

Parliamentary elections were held in South Yemen between 16 and 18 December 1978. The first elections since independence in 1967, they saw 175 candidates (all affiliated with the Yemeni Socialist Party, the sole legal party) contest the 111 seats of the Supreme People's Council. Voter turnout was reported to be 91.27%.

== Electoral system ==
The 111 Members of Parliament were elected by plurality in eighty constituencies, with voters having the same number of votes as the number of seats available in their constituency.

== Results ==
Party	Votes	%	Seats
Yemeni Socialist Party	596,787	100.00	111
Total	596,787	100.00	111
Valid votes	596,787	99.87	
Invalid/blank votes	763	0.13	
Total votes	597,550	100.00	
Registered voters/turnout	654,685	91.27	
Source: Nohlen et al., IPU
