= Presidium of the Supreme People's Council =

Highest institution of the former country of South Yemen

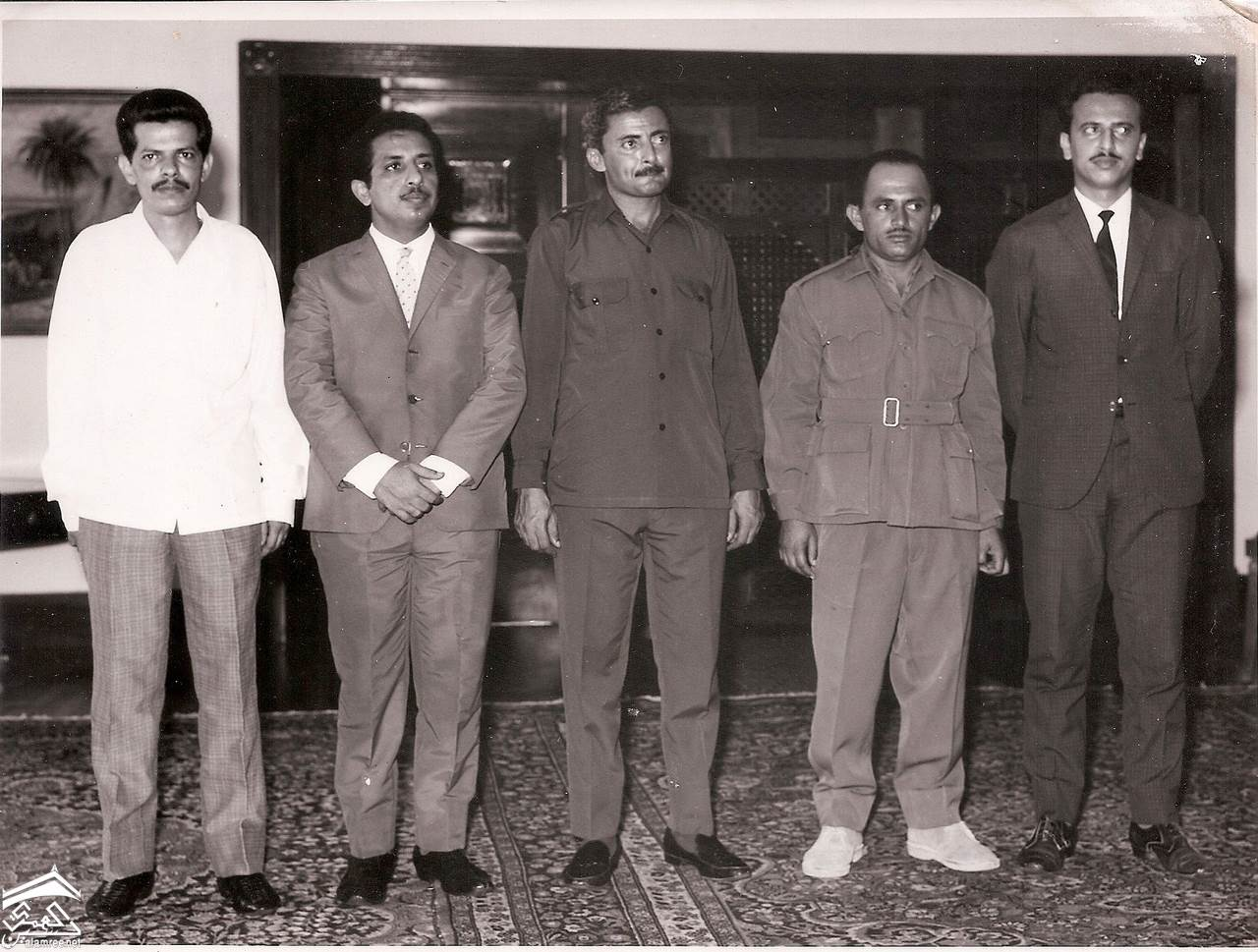
- Chairman and members of the Presidium of the Supreme People's Council after the corrective step on June 26, 1969, in the center is Salemin, to his left is Ali Antar, followed by Muhammad Ali Hathim, to his right is Muhammad Saleh Awlaki, followed by Abdul Fattah Ismail

Agency overview
- Formed: 23 June 1969
- Dissolved: 27 December 1978
- Superseding agency: Presidium of the Supreme People's Council
- Jurisdiction: People's Democratic Republic of Yemen
- Headquarters: Aden

The Presidium was the standing organ of the Supreme People's Council. Its chairman was the head of state.

== Chairmen ==
Name	Entered office	Left office
Salim Rubai Ali	23 June 1969	26 June 1978
Ali Nasser Muhammad	26 June 1978	27 December 1978

== Members (in 1970) ==
- Salim Rubai Ali (Chairman)
- Muhammad Ali Haithem
- Muhammad Saleh Aulaqi
- Ali Ahmed Nasser
- Abdul Fattah Ismail

== Sources ==
- The Europa World Year Book 1970, Volume II, p. 1353
