= Prime Minister of South Yemen =

- Emblem of Democratic Yemen
- Appointer: General Command, Politburo, Central Committee or any party apparatus
- Formation: 30 November 1967
- First holder: Qahtan Muhammad al-Shaabi (as President)
- Final holder: Haidar Abu Bakr al-Attas (as President)
- Abolished: 22 May 1990

The People's Democratic Republic of Yemen, commonly referred to as South Yemen, became independent as the People's Republic of South Yemen in 1967. The Prime Minister, appointed by the President, served as the head of government. The first Prime Minister was not appointed until April of 1969.

== Prime Ministers of the People's Republic of South Yemen, 1969-1970 ==
No.	Portrait	Name (Birth–Death)	Term of office			Party
No.	Portrait	Name (Birth–Death)	Took office	Left office	Time in office	Party
Prime Ministers of the People's Republic of South Yemen
1		Faysal al-Shaabi فيصل عبد الطيف الشعبي (1935–1970)	6 April 1969	22 June 1969		National Liberation Front
2		Muhammad Ali Haitham محمد علي هيثم (1940–1993)	23 June 1969	See below		National Liberation Front

== Prime Ministers of the People's Democratic Republic of Yemen, 1970-1990 ==
No.	Portrait	Name (Birth–Death)	Term of office			Party
No.	Portrait	Name (Birth–Death)	Took office	Left office	Time in office	Party
(2)		Muhammad Ali Haitham محمد علي هيثم (1940–1993)	See above	2 August 1971		National Liberation Front
3		Ali Nasir Muhammad علي ناصر محمد الحسني (1939–)	2 August 1971	21 December 1978		National Liberation Front
(3)		Ali Nasir Muhammad علي ناصر محمد الحسني (1939–)	21 December 1978	14 February 1985		Yemeni Socialist Party
4		Haidar Abu Bakr al-Attas حيدر أبو بكر العطاس (1939–)	14 February 1985	8 February 1986		Yemeni Socialist Party
5		Yasin Said Numan ياسين سعيد نعمان (1947–)	8 February 1986	22 May 1990		Yemeni Socialist Party

For Prime Ministers after the unification of Yemen in 1990, see Prime Minister of Yemen.

== Prime Ministers of the Democratic Republic of Yemen, 1994 ==
South Yemen also rebelled as the Democratic Republic of Yemen for a period of weeks in 1994.

No.	Portrait	Name (Birth–Death)	Term of office			Party
No.	Portrait	Name (Birth–Death)	Took office	Left office	Time in office	Party
Prime Minister of the Democratic Republic of Yemen
6		Haidar Abu Bakr al-Attas حيدر أبو بكر العطاس (1939–) (in rebellion)	21 May 1994	7 July 1994		Yemeni Socialist Party
