= South Yemen =

1967–1990 state in Western Asia

People's Republic of Southern Yemen (1967–1970) جمهورية اليمَنَ الجنوبيّة الشعبيّة People's Democratic Republic of Yemen (1970–1990) جمهورية اليمَنَ الدِّيمقراطية الشعبيّة
- 1967–1990
- Flag Emblem (1970–1990)
- Motto: لنناضل من أجل الدفاع عن الثورة اليمنية، وتنفيذ الخطة الخمسية، وتحقيق الوحدة اليمنية li-nunadil min ajl ad-difa' an ath-thawrah al-yamaniyyah, wa tanfidh al-khutah al-khamsiyyah, wa tahqiq al-wahdat al-yamaniyyah "For the struggle to defend the Yemeni revolution, implement the five-year plan, and achieve the Yemeni unification"
- Anthems: "النشيد الوطني لجمهورية اليمن الديمقراطية الشعبية" (National Anthem of the People's Democratic Republic of Yemen; 1967–1979); "رددي أيتها الدنيا نشيدي" (Repeat, O World, My Song; 1979–1990)
- Location of claimed territory of South Yemen (red) – in Asia (tan & white) – in Arabia (tan)
- Capital and largest city: Aden; 12.8°N 45.03°E
- Official languages: Arabic
- Other languages: Mehri; Hobyot; Soqotri
- Religion: Islam (official)
- Demonym: Yemeni/Yemenite
- Government: 1967–1969: Unitary Nasserist republic; 1969–1990: Unitary communist state
- General Secretary
  - 1978–1980: Abdul Fattah Ismail
  - 1980–1986: Ali Nasir Muhammad
  - 1986–1990: Ali Salem al-Beidh
- President
  - 1967–1969 (first): Qahtan al-Shaabi (Note: as President)
  - 1986–1990 (last): Haidar al-Attas (Note: as Chairman of the Presidium of the Supreme People's Council)
- Prime Minister
  - 1969 (first): Faysal al-Shaabi
  - 1986–1990 (last): Yasin Said Numan
- Legislature: Supreme People's Council
- Historical era: Cold War
  - Independence declared; Arab League membership: 30 November 1967
  - UN membership: 14 December 1967
  - Corrective Move: 22 June 1969
  - 1st Constitution adopted: 30 November 1970
  - 2nd Constitution adopted: 31 October 1978
  - South Yemeni crisis: 13 January 1986
  - Unification: 22 May 1990

Area
  - Total: 336,869 km^{2} (130,066 sq mi)

Population
  - 1973 census: ▲1,590,275
  - 1988 census: ▲2,345,266
  - Density: 6.3/km^{2} (16.3/sq mi)
- Currency: Yemeni dinar (دينار) (YDD)
- Time zone: AST
- Calling code: +969
- ISO 3166 code: YD
- Internet TLD: .yd (Note: Was eligible for a ccTLD, but not allocated)
Preceded by	Succeeded by
Federation of South Arabia; Protectorate of South Arabia	Yemen
- Today part of: Yemen
- ISO 3166-1 = YD; ISO 3166-3 = YDYE

South Yemen, (Note: Arabic: اليمن الجنوبي, romanised: al-Yaman al-Janūbī) officially the People's Democratic Republic of Yemen (PDRY), (Note: Arabic: جمهورية اليمن الديمقراطية الشعبية (ج.ي.د.ش.), romanised: Jumhūriyat al-Yaman ad-Dīmuqrāṭīyah ash-Sha'bīyah (Ja.Ya.Da.Sha.)) abbreviated to Democratic Yemen, (Note: Arabic: اليمن الديمقراطي, romanised: al-Yaman ad-Dīmuqrāṭīyy; or Arabic: اليمن الديمقراطية, romanised: al-Yaman ad-Dīmuqrāṭīyah) (Note: also as: Yemen (Aden) (اليمن (عدن), al-Yaman ('Adin))) was a country in South Arabia that existed in what is now southeast Yemen from 1967 until its unification with the Yemen Arab Republic in 1990. The sole communist state in the Middle East and the Arab world, it comprised the southern and eastern governorates of the present-day Republic of Yemen, including the islands of Perim, Kamaran, and the Socotra Archipelago. It shared ill-defined and often disputed borders with the Yemen Arab Republic to the northwest, Saudi Arabia to the north, Oman to the east. Its capital and largest city was Aden.

South Yemen's origins can be traced to 1874 with the creation of the British Colony of Aden and the Aden Protectorate, which consisted of two-thirds of present-day Yemen. Prior to 1937, what was to become the Colony of Aden had been governed as a part of British India, originally as the Aden Settlement subordinate to the Bombay Presidency and then as a Chief Commissioner's province. After the establishments of the Protectorate and Federation of South Arabia amidst rising Pan-Arab and anti-colonial sentiment, an armed rebellion began in 1963 that was led by the National Liberation Front (NLF) and the Front for the Liberation of Occupied South Yemen (FLOSY) against British colonial rule. The Federation and Protectorate of South Arabia were overthrown to become the People's Republic of Southern Yemen (PRSY) on 30 November 1967.

On 22 June 1969, the Marxist–Leninist faction of the NLF, led by Abdel Fattah Ismail and Salim Rubai Ali, overthrew the Nasserist President Qahtan al-Shaabi in an internal bloodless coup that was later called the Corrective Move. The Marxist–Leninist takeover later led to the creation of the Yemeni Socialist Party (YSP), and South Yemen's transformation into a one-party, socialist state. The official name of the state was changed a year after the reforms to the People's Democratic Republic of Yemen, and was able to establish strong relations with Cuba, East Germany, North Korea, China, and the Soviet Union. Despite its efforts to bring stability into the region, it was involved in a brief civil war in 1986. The PDRY unified with the Yemen Arab Republic on 22 May 1990, to form the present-day Republic of Yemen.

Politically, South Yemen operated as a centralised Marxist–Leninist state where legislative authority rested with the Supreme People's Council. The official state ideology was scientific socialism. The state supported regional left-wing movements in the Arab states of the Persian Gulf, the Yemen Arab Republic, and the Horn of Africa. Economically, the state transitioned from Aden's colonial port-based system to central planning, agricultural land reform, and state-backed cooperatives. Although resource-scarce for much of its history, major petroleum deposits were discovered in the Shabwah Governorate in late 1986.

Socially, the PDRY established a state welfare system offering universal basic living standards, universal health care, and education, achieving one of the highest literacy rates in the region. The government actively secularised personal law and enacted progressive policies for women's rights, notably through the 1974 Family Law which banned child marriage and polygamy.

== Background ==
=== British arrival in Yemen ===
The first political intercourse between Yemen and the British took place in 1799 during the French invasion of Egypt and Syria, when a naval force was sent from Britain, with a detachment of troops from India, to occupy the island of Perim and prevent all communication of the French in Egypt with the Indian Ocean, by way of the Red Sea. Due to the lack of water supply, the barren and inhospitable island of Perim was found unsuitable for troops, and the Sultan of Lahej, Ahmed bin Abdul Karim, received the detachment for some time at Aden. He proposed to enter into an alliance and to grant Aden as a permanent station, but the offer was declined. A treaty was, however, concluded with the Sultan in 1802 by Admiral Home Popham, who was instructed to enter into political and commercial alliances with the Chiefs of the Arabian coast of the Red Sea.

By the early 1800s, the British were looking for a coaling station where they could fuel their steamships through their journey from the Suez Canal to the British Raj. The British tried to negotiate with the Mahra Sultanate to buy the island of Socotra, located in the Arabian Sea, but the Sultan of Mahra refused, telling the British naval officer tasked with the mission that the island was "the gift of the Almighty to the Mahris". In 1835, a year after the British had given up on Socotra, they had attempted to purchase the port city of Aden and its inlet from the Sultan of Lahej, Muhsin Bin Fadl, but they failed. In 1837, the Duria Dawla, an Indian ship flying the Union Jack, crashed near the east coast of Aden and was looted by local tribesmen. A year after the incident, in 1838, British officials arrived in Lahej and demanded 12,000 Maria Theresa thalers (MTT) as compensation for the losses. The sultan, unable to pay that sum of money, was forced to cede Aden to the British for a sum of 8,700 MTT a year. On 19 January 1839, the British East India Company landed Royal Marines at Aden to retain full control of Aden and stop attacks by pirates against British shipping to India.

Following the landing in Aden, the British established informal treaties of protection with nine sheikhdoms and sultanates in the surrounding region. This was more a precautionary measure to prevent the Imams of Yemen from storming Aden, which was something the sheikhdoms did not want to happen. These agreements allowed the British to maintain control, using the existing tribal structures to assert their influence. Since the region was plagued by frequent tribal conflicts and no single ruler held enough sway to unify the tribes, there was little threat to British dominance. This fragmentation not only prevented any strong opposition but also delayed the formation of a broader national identity. The British, in turn, benefited from a system that was both efficient and inexpensive, spending only around $5,435 a year in subsidies to secure the loyalty of twenty-five sultans. By avoiding direct administration and relying on a policy of strategic dependence, the British were able to expand their influence. By 1914, they had treaties with nearly every sultan in the region.

=== Partitioning Yemen ===
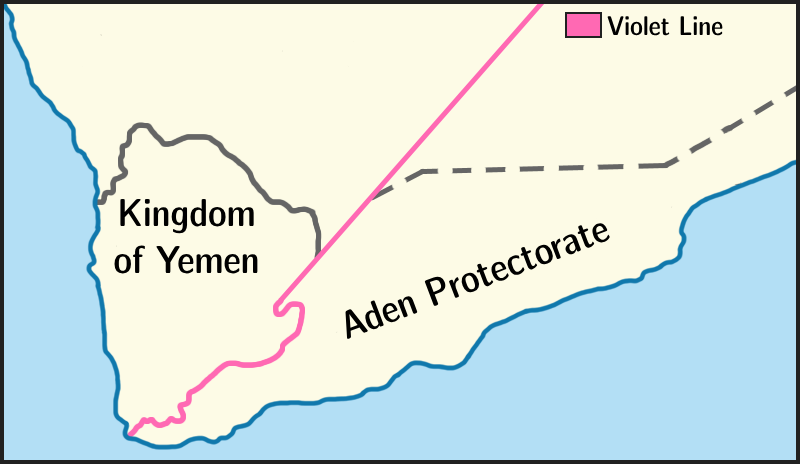
Map showing the Violet Line

In 1914, following the Anglo-Ottoman Convention of 1913, the British and the Ottomans divided Arabia into two parts: the northwest under Ottoman control and influence, and the southeast under British control and influence. Although a further agreement, which came to be later known as the Violet Line, was negotiated, the Ottomans planned an invasion of the Aden Protectorate in co-operation with local tribes. They had gathered significant strength at Cheikh Saïd. On 5 November 1914, during the First World War, the British declared war on the Ottomans, who responded with their declaration a few days later, on 11 November. Although the Ottomans managed to capture the Sultanate of Lahej and reach the city of Aden, they were later expelled by the British. Around the same time, the British-sponsored Arab Revolt in the Hejaz broke out, diverting Ottoman attention from Aden and effectively ending their campaign. The Armistice of Mudros, signed in 1918, officially concluded the war and forced the Ottomans out of Arabia, leading to the establishment of the Kingdom of Yemen.

During the period between the two World Wars, Aden grew significantly in strategic value to the British. Positioned near the entrance to the Persian Gulf, it played a crucial role in safeguarding maritime routes through the Suez Canal and was close to the newly discovered oil reserves in the Arabian Peninsula. Recognising its increased importance, Britain formally designated Aden as a Crown Colony in 1937 and implemented a full colonial administrative system. This move further diminished the authority of local rulers, as Britain took full control over governance and policy decisions. The centralisation of power in British hands sparked several small-scale uprisings. In response, Yemeni leaders, often supported by British forces, resorted to harsh and repressive tactics to suppress dissent and maintain order among the tribes.

=== Beginning of the end of British rule in Yemen ===
In 1952, Arab nationalism began to sweep across the Arab world, starting in Egypt, accompanied by anti-colonial sentiments. Nationalist pressures prompted the rulers of the Aden Protectorate states to renew efforts at forming a federation. On 11 February 1959, six of these states signed an accord to form the Federation of the Emirates of South Arabia. Over the next three years, nine additional sheikhdoms joined, and on 18 January 1963, Aden Colony was merged with the federation, creating the new Federation of South Arabia (FSA), although all but four sheikhdoms out of twenty-one had joined the union. Meanwhile, the Qu'aiti and Kathiri sultanates of Hadhramaut, along with Mahra, and Upper Yafa refused to join either of the federations and became the Protectorate of South Arabia, marking the end of the Aden Protectorate. The FSA did not succeed for several reasons, the first of which was the British insistence that the State of Aden would be part of the entity, which was rejected by the commercial elite of Aden, most of whom were Indians, Persians, and Jews, because they feared that Aden's wealth would be taken away by the neighbouring sheikhdoms. On the other hand, the leaders of the sheikhdoms had little experience with federal rule and had no desire for cooperation. In addition to all that, there were differences between the sheikhdoms over who should head the federation's new government.

On 26 September 1962, a successful coup carried out against the Kingdom of Yemen by the Free Officers Movement in Yemen, supported by Egyptian President Gamal Abdel Nasser—who had led the Egyptian Revolution of 1952 against British rule—resulted in the establishment of the Yemen Arab Republic. This coup inspired organisations, such as the local branch of the Movement of Arab Nationalists and the Aden Trade Union Congress, to form the National Liberation Front (NLF) (Note: led by Qahtan al-Shaabi) and the Front for the Liberation of Occupied South Yemen (FLOSY), (Note: led by Abdullah al-Asnag) respectively. Supporters of the NLF were from the countryside of Radfan, Yafa', and Ad-Dali, while the supporters of the FLOSY were mainly the citizens of Aden. This is because tribal affiliations played a major role in attracting supporters.

== History ==
=== Decolonisation and NLF seizure of power ===
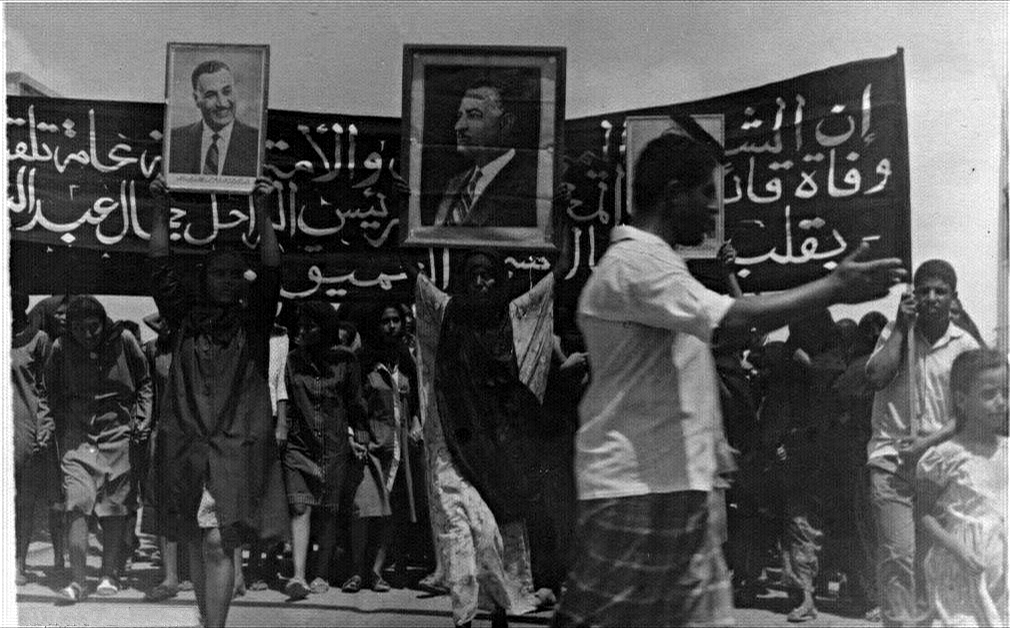
Nasserist demonstration against the British presence during the Aden emergency

The first uprising against the British was in Radfan on 14 October 1963, when 7,000 armed Radfani tribesmen, inspired by the coup in the north, joined the National Liberation Front (NLF) with the goals of turning the tribes of the Federation of South Arabia against the British, and achieving independence through guerrilla warfare. The strategy of the NLF was to harass and exhaust the British military using hit-and-run tactics. By 10 December 1963, the uprising had reached Aden. An NLF grenade attack against the High Commissioner of Aden, Kennedy Trevaskis, killed the High Commissioner's adviser and a bystander, and injured fifty other people. On that day, a state of emergency was declared in Aden. In January 1964, the British responded by a 3-month bombing campaign in Radfan, which subdued the insurgents. The insurgency in Radfan began raising questions in the Parliament of the United Kingdom on what should the fate of Aden and the protectorates be.

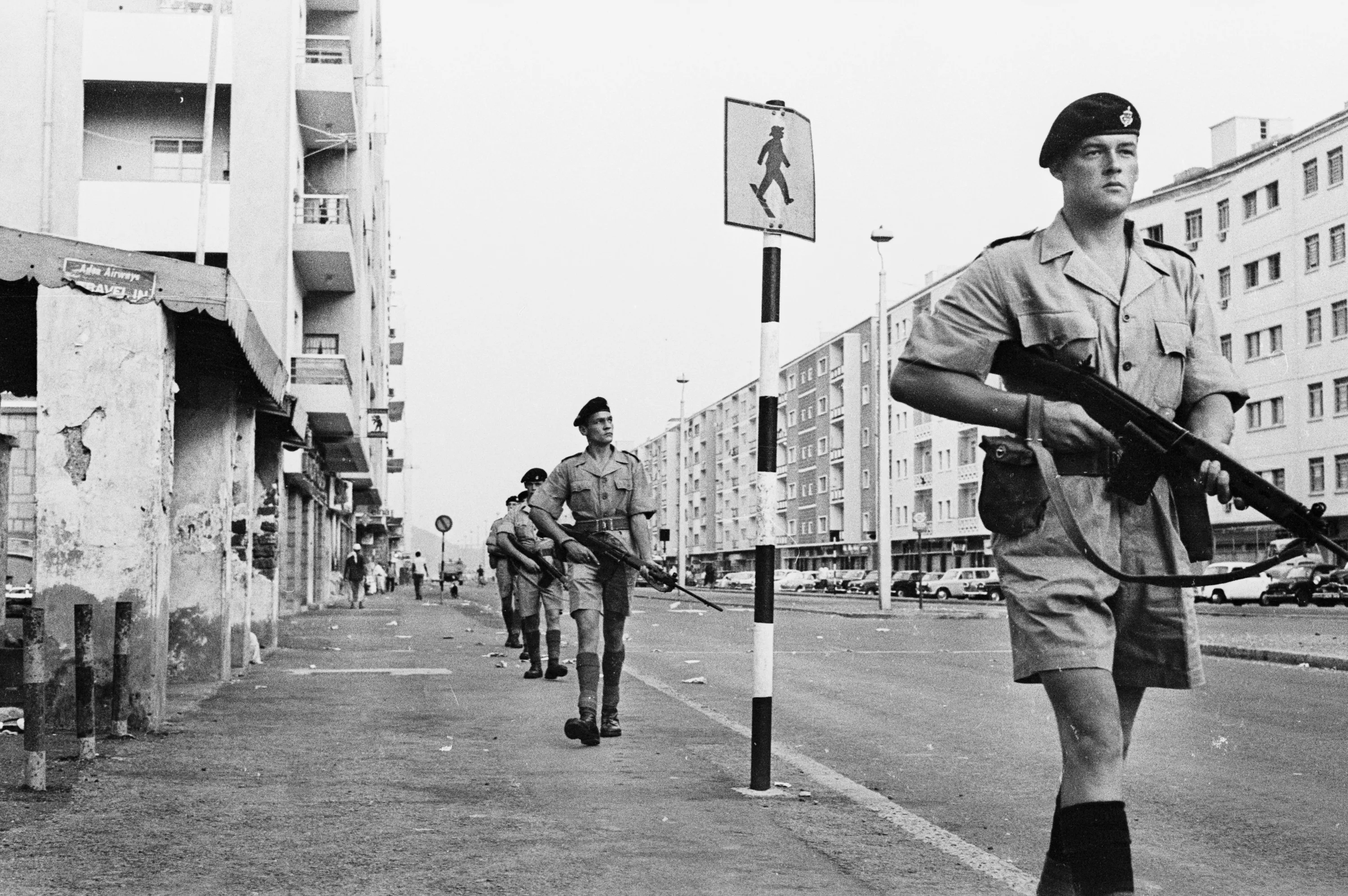
A British foot patrol in Mualla, Aden

By 1965, most western protectorates had fallen to the National Liberation Front. Hadhramaut seemed calm until 1966 because the British presence there was less than its counterpart in the western protectorates. Ali Salem al-Beidh and Haidar al-Attas joined the NLF faction in the eastern protectorates and prevented the sultans of the Kathiri Sultanate and the Qu'aiti Sultanate from entering their sultanates but allowed the Sultan of the Mahra back, in sympathy for his old age. Al-Beidh played a major role in gathering supporters in favour of the NLF in Hadhramaut, taking advantage of the near absence of the British in the eastern protectorates. In February 1966, the British had announced that they would withdraw from Aden and cancel all protection treaties with the sultanates and sheikhdoms by 1968. The announcement came as a shock to the protected sultans and sheiks, with one of the sultans expressing his fear of "being murdered in the street". The insurgents did not trust the promise, reasoning that the British wouldn't be abandoning their important base of Aden "without a real fight." By March 1967, the British had set the date for their departure to be on November of that year.

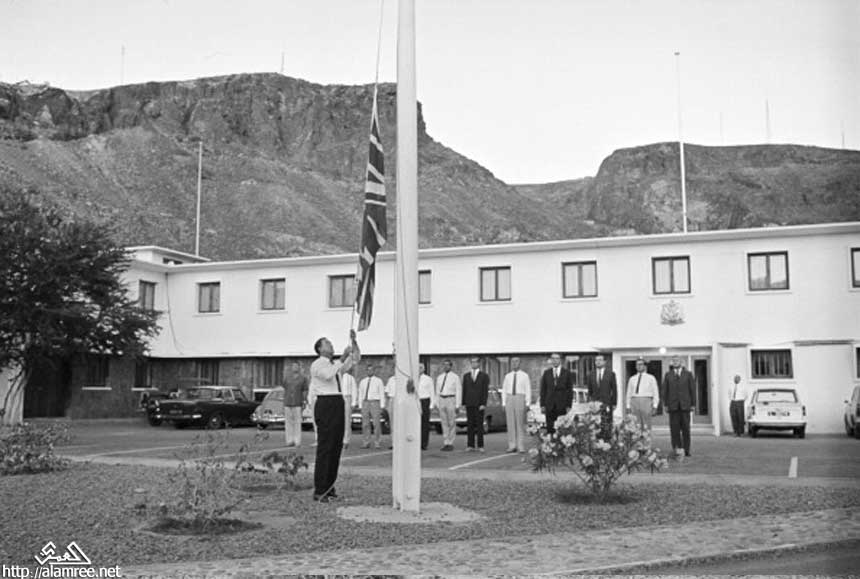
Lowering of the Union Jack in Aden

Following Israel's victory in the Six-Day War of June 1967, which was considered a humiliation for the Arab world, the anti-colonial sentiment was at its all-time high due to Britain's role in the creation of Israel following the First World War. Slogans like "A bullet against Britain is a bullet against Israel" appeared, and attacks against the British had increased. Graffiti of the acronyms of the NLF and FLOSY had filled the streets in Aden, and the infighting between those two groups for power had increased. In the same month, an NLF-directed Arab Police mutiny in Crater ambushed a British military patrol and slaughtered three Argyll & Sutherland Highlanders and captured the city of Crater. The capture of Crater was considered a significant victory for the Arab world. Colin Mitchell, also known as "Mad Mitch", led his battalion back into Crater and retook it with minimal casualties. However, his methods were deemed too extreme, and he was ejected from the army. The battle later came to be known as "the last battle of the British Empire." According to the American consul in Aden, the British handling of the insurgents "evolved from attempting to take them unharmed to summary justice in the streets."

=== Independence ===
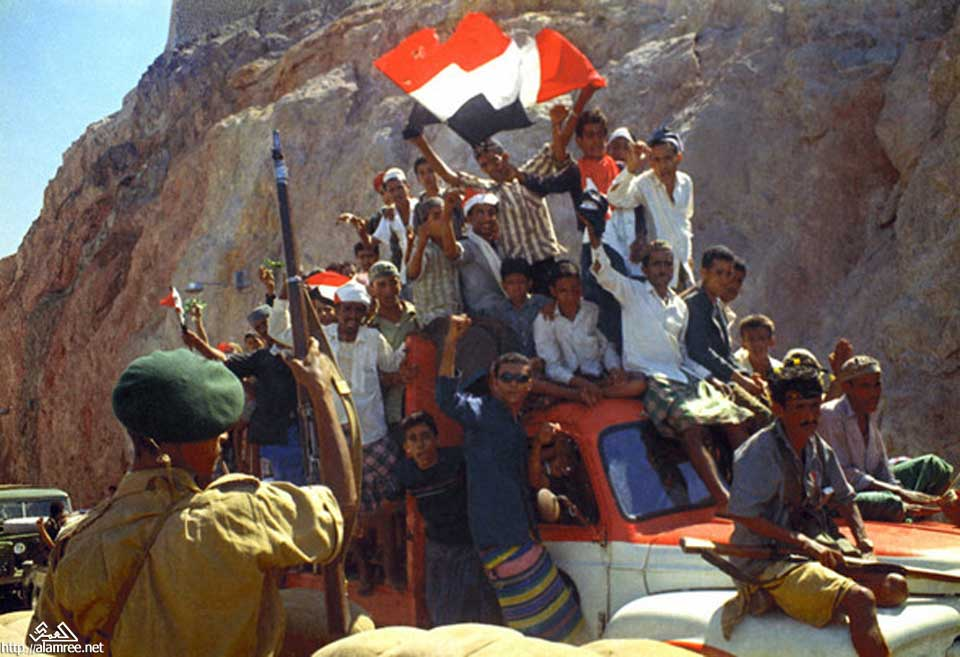
NLF supporters waving their flags as part of the celebrations and mass marches on 29 and 30 November 1967

The sultans tried to negotiate terms with the FLOSY, whom they calculated was the "lesser evil", but it came to little success. At that time, the British had advised the sultans to attend the ongoing Geneva negotiations between the British and the NLF, hoping that the United Nations would arrange a solution for them. The British demands were an orderly handover to the authorities, and that the new state not interfere in the affairs of any country in the Arabian Peninsula. The British were surprised by the presence of people they thought were loyal to them alongside the popular Qahtan. The NLF had used the sultans' absences and toppled the sultanates and made headway in Aden, Hadhramaut, Mahra, and the island of Socotra. On 7 November, the Federal Army came out in support of the NLF, and the British government was forced to negotiate a hasty handover. On 20 November, the British government eventually recognised the NLF as the de facto new power in the land, and spent their last 10 days trying to pare down their promised aid from £60 million to £12 million. The last British troops departed eleven hours before the birth of the new People's Republic of Southern Yemen at midnight on 29–30 November, marking an end to 128 years of colonial rule, and on 14 December 1967, it was admitted into the United Nations as a member state.

Scenes from the celebrations of the independence by supporters of the NLF

The National Liberation Front had the upper hand at the expense of the Front for the Liberation of Occupied South Yemen, whose members were divided between joining the National Front or leaving for North Yemen. Abdullah Al-Asnag and Mohammed Basindawa left for the Yemen Arab Republic. Qahtan al-Shaabi assumed the presidency of a state that had never existed before, with a collapsed economy. Civilian workers and businessmen left, British support stopped, and the closure of the Suez Canal in 1967 reduced the number of ships crossing Aden by 75%.

On 11 December 1967, the lands of what was called the "feudal symbols and British agents" were confiscated, and the state was divided into six governorates. The move aimed to end tribal aspects in the state and ignore the tribal borders between the defunct sheikhdoms. On 16 June 1969, Qahtan fired Interior Minister Muhammad Ali Haitham, but the latter withdrew his ties to the tribes and the army, he was able to ally himself with Muhammad Saleh Al-Awlaki, and they reassembled the leftist forces that President Qahtan Al-Shaabi had dispersed. They were able to arrest him and place him under house arrest.

=== Reforms and the establishment of a Marxist-Leninist state ===
The National Liberation Front, now rebranded as the National Front, had approximately 26,000 members, a small number of university-educated leaders, and all of them, without exception, had no experience in government. The front was divided into two right-wing and left-wing sections. The right-wingers and their popular leader, Qahtan, did not want to make major changes in the prevailing social and economic structure and took a conservative stance toward "liberating all Arab lands from colonialism, supporting the resistance of the Palestinian people, and supporting socialist regimes around the world to resist imperialism and colonial forces in the Third World." The leftist faction of the National Front was also promoting and opposing the establishment of popular forces and proposals to nationalise lands, and they were not preoccupied with the struggle of social classes. Qahtan wanted the continuation of existing institutions and their development. The leftist faction "wanted a social and economic transformation that would serve the broad segment of the working people instead of the wealthy minority", as they put it. on 20 March 1968, Qahtan's right-wing faction dismissed all leftist leaders from the government and party membership and was able to put down a rebellion led by leftist factions in the army in May of the same year. In July, August, and December 1968, the popular Qahtan faced new rebellions from leftist parties because all Arab countries welcomed the front. The National Liberation Front received a cold reception, as regimes like Egypt wanted to merge the National Front with the Front for the Liberation of Occupied South Yemen. The leftist faction was more numerous than the supporters of the popular Qahtan, and they wanted a regime that would lead the masses and face the great challenges facing the new state, the most important of which was the bankruptcy of the treasury.

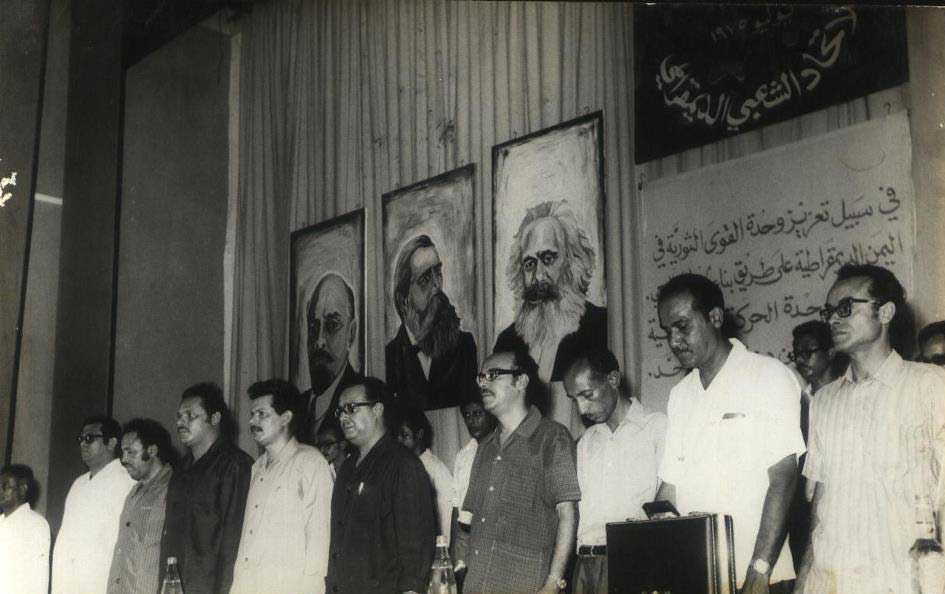
Ali Nasser, Abdul Fattah Ismail, and Abdullah Badheeb at the Popular Democratic Union Festival in the 1970s, with portraits of Karl Marx, Friedrich Engels, and Vladimir Lenin behind them

On 22 June 1969, a radical Marxist wing of the NLF formed a presidential committee of five people: Salim Rubaya Ali, who became president, Muhammad Saleh Al-Awlaki, Ali Antar, Abdel Fattah Ismail, and Muhammad Ali Haitham, who became prime minister. They gained power in an event known as the "Corrective Move". This radical wing reorganised the country into the People's Democratic Republic of Yemen (PDRY) on 30 November 1970. Subsequently, all political parties were amalgamated into the National Liberation Front, renamed the Yemeni Socialist Party, which became the only legal party. This group took an extreme leftist line and declared its support for the Palestinians and the Dhofar Revolution. West Germany severed its relationship with the state due to its recognition of East Germany. The United States also severed its relationship in October 1969. The new powers issued a new constitution, nationalised foreign banks and insurance companies, and changed the name of the state to The People's Democratic Republic of Yemen in line with the Marxist–Leninist approach they followed. A centrally planned economy was established. The People's Democratic Republic of Yemen established close ties with the Soviet Union, the German Democratic Republic, Cuba, and the Palestinian Liberation Organization. East Germany's constitution of 1968 even served as a kind of blueprint for the PDRY's first constitution.

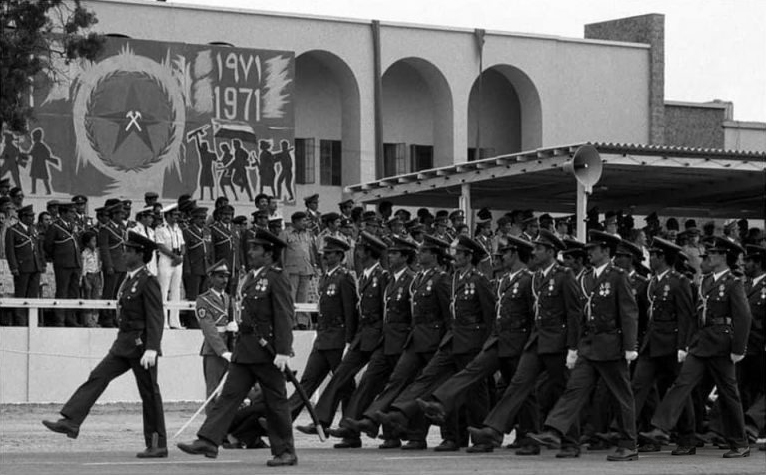
People's Defense Forces military parade, 1971

The new government embarked on a programme of nationalisation, introduced central planning, put limits on housing ownership and rent, and implemented land reforms. By 1973, the GDP of South Yemen increased by 25 percent. Despite the conservative environment and resistance, women became legally equal to men, polygamy, child marriage and arranged marriage were all banned by law and equal rights in divorce were sanctioned; all supported and protected by the state General Union of Yemeni Women. The Republic also secularised education and sharia law was replaced by a state legal code. Slavery in Yemen, which had been abolished in North Yemen by the 1962 revolution, was now abolished also in South Yemen.

The major communist powers assisted in the building of the PDRY's armed forces. Strong support from Moscow resulted in Soviet naval forces gaining access to naval facilities in South Yemen. The most significant among them, a Soviet naval and air base on the island of Socotra for operations in the Indian Ocean.

=== 1986 Civil War ===
On 13 January 1986, a violent struggle began in Aden between Ali Nasir's supporters and supporters of the returned Ismail, who wanted power back. This conflict, known as the South Yemen Civil War, lasted for more than a month and resulted in thousands of casualties, Ali Nasir's ouster, and Ismail's disappearance and presumed death. Some 60,000 people, including the deposed Ali Nasir, fled to the YAR. Ali Salem al-Beidh, an ally of Ismail who had succeeded in escaping the attack on pro-Ismail members of the Politburo, then became General Secretary of the Yemeni Socialist Party.

=== Unification ===
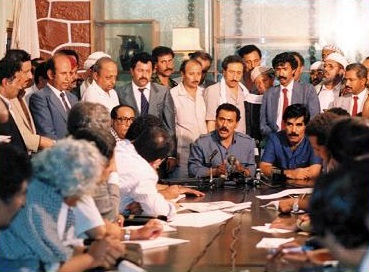
North Yemeni president, Ali Abdullah Saleh, with the Secretary-General of the Yemeni Socialist Party, Ali Salem al-Beidh, signing the unity agreement on 30 November 1989.

Against the background of the perestroika in the USSR, the main backer of the PDRY, political reforms were started in the late 1980s. Political prisoners were released, political parties were formed, and the system of justice was reckoned to be more equitable than in the North. In May 1988, the YAR and PDRY governments came to an understanding that considerably reduced tensions, including agreement to renew discussions concerning unification, to establish a joint oil exploration area along their undefined border, to demilitarise the border, and to allow Yemenis unrestricted border passage based on only a national identification card.

In November 1989, after returning from the Soviet–Afghan War, Osama bin Laden offered to send the newly formed al-Qaeda to overthrow the South Yemeni government on behalf of Saudi Arabia, but Prince Turki bin Faisal found the plan reckless and declined.

In 1990, the parties reached a full agreement on joint governing of Yemen, and the countries were effectively merged as Yemen, but not without internal divisions leading to the 1994 Yemeni Civil War

== Government and politics ==
=== Ruling party ===
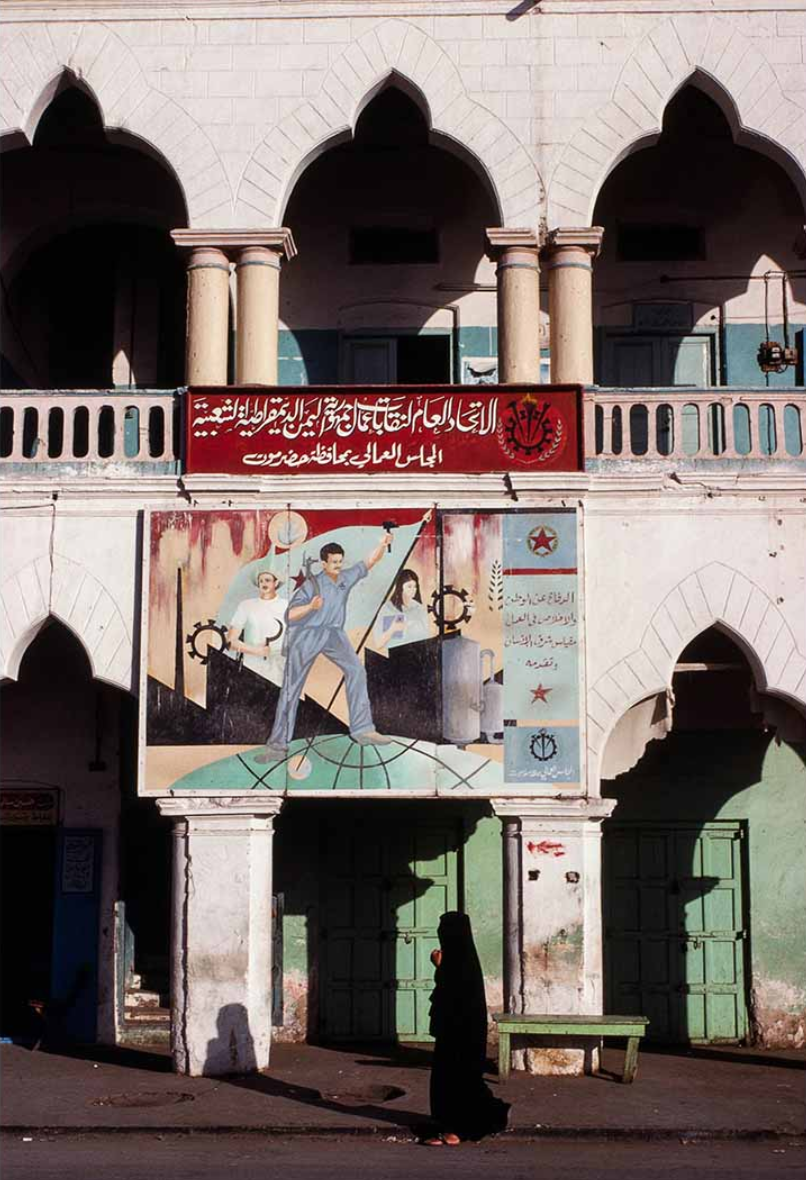
Headquarters of the Yemeni Socialist Party in Mukalla, 1989

The People's Democratic Republic of Yemen (PDRY) developed as a Marxist–Leninist society, ruled first by the National Front, which later became the Yemeni Socialist Party in 1978.

The National Front (NF) won control of the party apparatus in 1966 and the state following the Corrective Move of 1969.

Two other political parties were allowed to operate alongside the NF in South Yemen: the People's Vanguard Party, a Baathist party, and the Popular Democratic Union, a communist party. The two were incorporated into the Unified Political Organization of the National Front in October 1975.

The Yemeni Socialist Party (YSP) was established by Abdul Fattah Ismail in 1978 following a unification process of several Yemeni revolutionary groups in both South and North Yemen. The core of the YSP came from the United Political Organization of the National Front – itself the result of the merger of three parties, namely the National Front (NF), the Democratic Popular Union Party (Marxist) and the Popular Vanguard Party (a left-wing Ba'athist party) – and the Yemeni Popular Unity Party in North Yemen, which had itself emerged from the merger of five left-wing organisations, namely the Revolutionary Democratic Party of Yemen, the Popular Vanguard Party in North Yemen, the Organisation of Yemeni Revolutionary Resistors, the Popular Democratic Union and the Labour Party.

The 1st Congress of the new party, which led to the party's creation and approved its programme documents, took place on 13–14 October 1978. The charter proclaimed that the party as "the vanguard of the Yemeni working class in alliance with the peasantry and other strata of the working people. The party unites in its ranks on a voluntary militant basis the most progressive and conscious elements of the working class, peasantry, soldiers, revolutionary intelligentsia, and all those who accept the party's political program."

According to the Charter, the theoretical basis of the YSP is scientific socialism. The goal of the party was "the construction of a unified democratic Yemen with a socialist perspective." The programme viewed the YSP as the leading and guiding force "in the struggle for the full implementation of the tasks of the national-democratic revolution and the transition to a new stage." Abdul Fattah Ismail was elected General Secretary of the YSP Central Committee. The sole legal party in the country, the YSP won all 111 seats in the parliamentary elections in December 1978.

The membership of the YSP reached 25,000 by the early 1980s. In October 1980, an extraordinary 2nd Congress of the YSP was held, which confirmed the course toward a socialist orientation.

In April 1980, head of party and state Abdul Fattah Ismail, under pressure from internal party forces and with the consent of the USSR, resigned "for health reasons" and went into exile in Moscow. He was replaced as President of South Yemen by Ali Nasser Mohammed, who was seen as a more moderate and conciliatory leader compared to the pro-Soviet line of his predecessor. He sought to improve relations with South Yemen's Arab neighbours and the West.

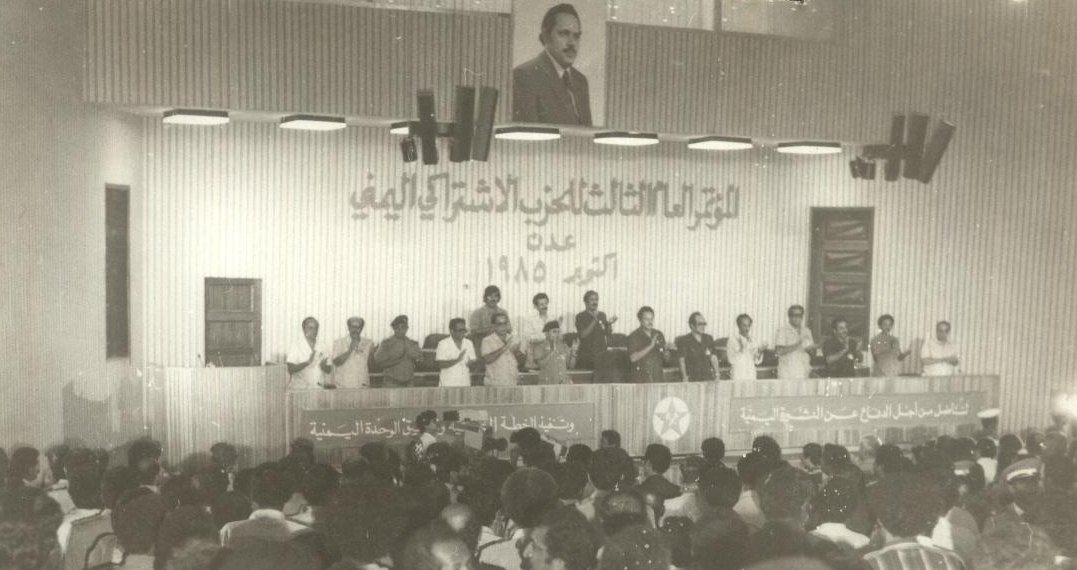
Third Congress of the Yemeni Socialist Party, held by Ali Nasir Mohammed, 1985

At the 3rd Congress of the YSP on 11–13 October 1985, the quantitative and qualitative growth of the party ranks was noted. In December 1980, it had 19,198 members and candidates, and by June 1985, there were already 32,786. Workers made up 14.8% of members and candidates, peasants 9.6%, intelligentsia 20.6%, and office workers/military 55%.

Due to tensions within the party, in June 1985, the YSP Politburo adopted a resolution stating that anyone who resorts to violence in resolving internal political disputes would be considered a criminal and a traitor to the motherland.

Conflict between the two factions of the YSP led to the South Yemen Civil War in 1986, which led to the death of Abdul Fattah Ismail, although his ally Ali Salem al-Beidh took control of the party, while the more moderate Haidar Abu Bakr al-Attas became president. Al-Beidh and al-Attas would occupy positions in the government of a reunified Yemen until the 1994 civil war. Parliamentary elections were held in October 1986, and although the YSP remained the sole legal party, independent candidates were allowed to contest the elections, winning 40 of the 111 seats, with the YSP winning the other 71.

=== Government ===
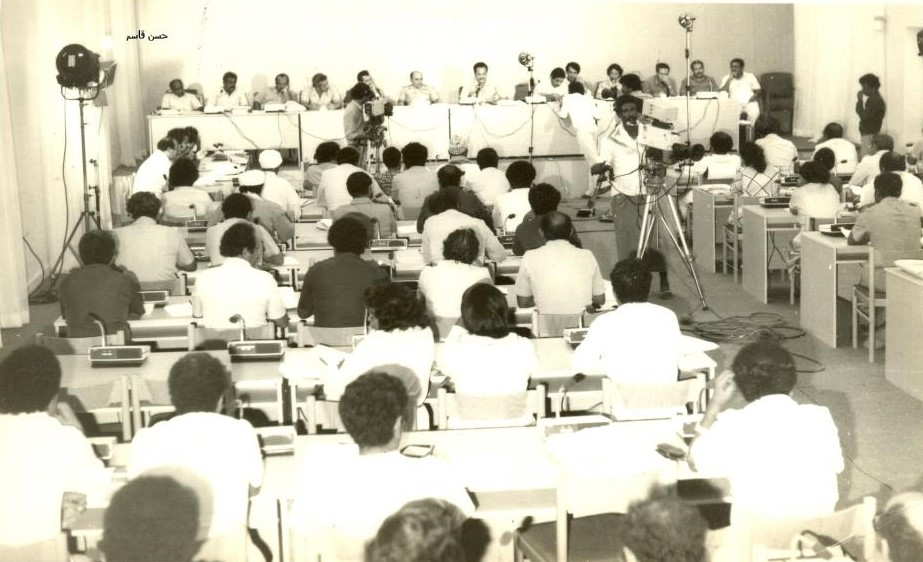
Supreme People's Council led by the Secretary-General of the Yemeni Socialist Party, Ali Nasir

Members of the Yemeni Socialist Party and the Government, especially Abdul Fattah Ismail, drafted the state's constitution. Egyptian and East German advisors provided technical assistance. Promulgated on 30 November 1970, seventeen months after the Corrective Move, it was later amended on 31 October 1978 to formalise the replacement of the National Front by the Yemeni Socialist Party (YSP).

The document was organised into six main parts. Part I outlined the state's political, economic, and cultural foundations across 32 articles, committing the state to Yemeni unity, anti-imperialism, and scientific socialism under YSP leadership, while establishing a centrally planned mixed economy, agrarian land reform, a state monopoly on foreign trade, and recognising Islam as the state religion under Article 46. Part II defined civic rights and duties across Articles 33 to 61, guaranteeing equality, employment, medical care, education, and freedom of religious belief and expression, alongside granting asylum to liberation movements and establishing the legal status of trade unions, women's organisations, and youth groups. The remaining constitutional sections governed state organisation and administration: Part III (Articles 62–115) defined the structure and operational scope of state authority; Part IV (Articles 116–124) codified democratic law and the judicial branch; Part V (Articles 125–130) established the national defence and security mandate; and Part VI (Articles 131–135) set forth interim and final operational rules.

Executive power experienced significant institutional development over the country's existence. Under Chapter 2 of the 1970 Constitution, executive authority was initially held by a Presidential Council comprising three to six senior leaders, typically including the President, Prime Minister, and Party Secretary-General, who oversaw state policy, appointed military and judicial leadership, and directed foreign affairs. In 1978, this body was replaced by an eleven-member Presidium of the Supreme People's Council, whose Chairman functioned as the formal Head of State and President of the Republic. Administrative and daily executive functions were carried out by the Council of Ministers, established under Chapter 3 as the highest executive organ. Led by the Prime Minister, the Council managed public finances, implemented state economic development plans, supervised individual government ministries, and maintained internal security. The Council of Ministers was formed by the Supreme People's Council. Local representative bodies were the people's councils, and their decisions were taken into account when the members of the Supreme People's Council were governing. Local executive bodies were the executive bureaus of the people's councils. Specialised supervisory bodies, such as the Supreme Planning Council and the Supreme Council for National Defence, were also constitutionally mandated to coordinate long-term national development and defence strategy.

In 1978, the Election Law No. 18 introduced significant democratic reforms, guaranteeing universal, equal, secret, and direct elections for all citizens aged 18 or over. The law explicitly affirmed women's right to vote. Candidates could run as either members of the Yemen Socialist Party or as independents, and had to be at least 24 years old.

Legislative authority and sovereign state power rested with the Supreme People's Council (SPC). Originally consisting of 101 members, its membership expanded to 111 in 1978, with representatives elected through direct and indirect ballots. The SPC was responsible for passing state legislation, setting guidelines for foreign and domestic policy, ratifying international treaties, approving the national economic development plan and state budget, and electing the executive leadership. The SPC was elected by the people for a five-year term. The council was appointed by the General Command of the National Front in 1971. The Presidium of the Supreme People's Council, was elected by the Supreme People's Council for five years as well.

The judicial branch was established under Part IV of the 1970 Constitution. The system comprised a Supreme Court as the highest judicial authority, supported by courts of appeal, provincial courts, and district or magistrate courts of first instance.

Following independence in 1967, the state experienced significant administrative constraints due to the departure of British and Indian colonial officials and civil service purges following the 1969 Corrective Move. To overcome the shortage of trained personnel, the government restructured the civil service and expanded public education to train a new generation of state administrators.

=== Foreign relations ===
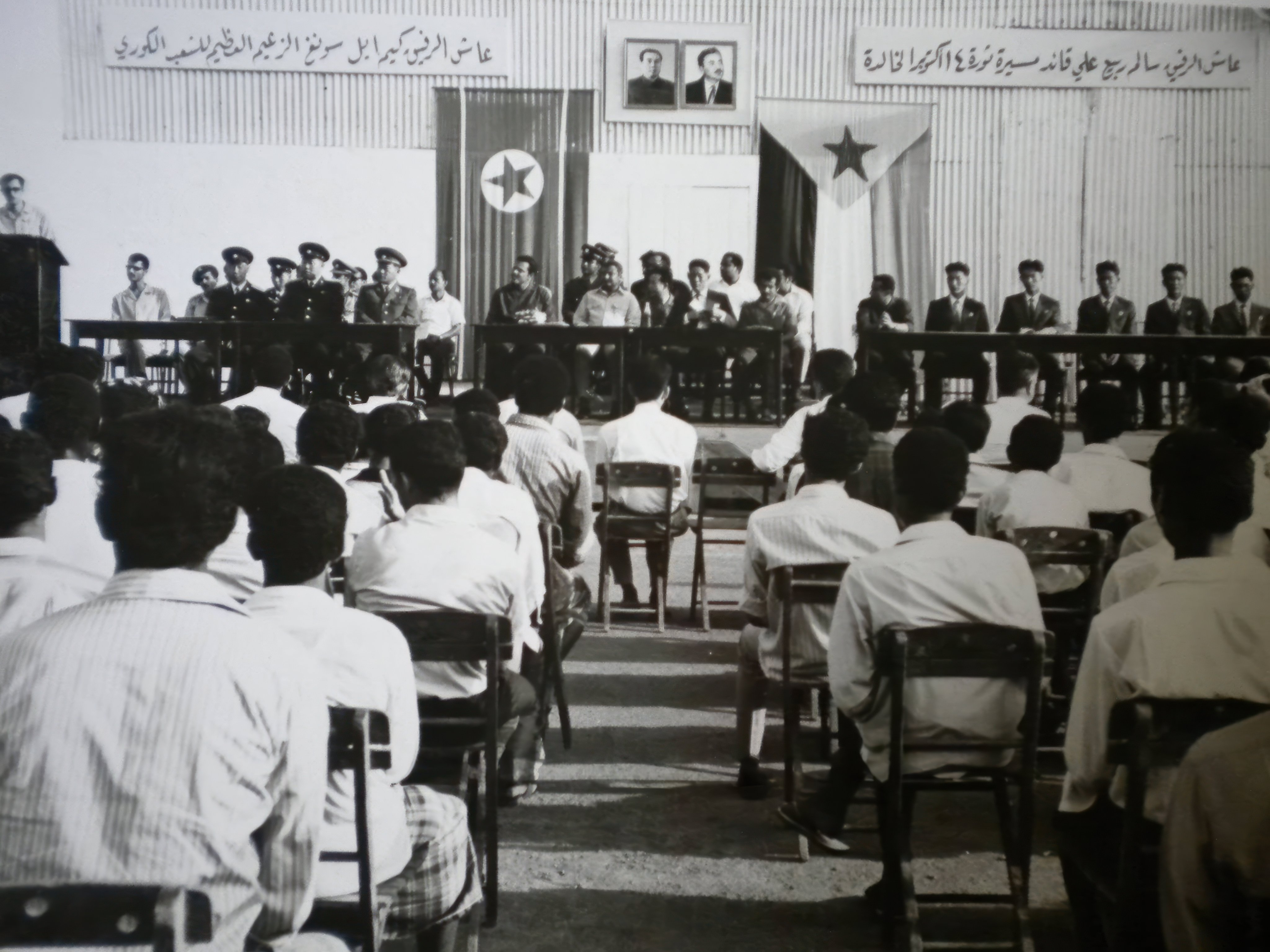
Meeting of representatives of South Yemen and North Korea, 1970s.

The only avowedly Marxist–Leninist nation in the Middle East, South Yemen received significant foreign aid and other assistance from the USSR and East Germany, which stationed several hundred officers of the Stasi in the country to train the nation's secret police and establish another arms trafficking route to Palestine. The East Germans did not leave until 1990, when the Yemeni government declined to pay their salaries which had been terminated with the dissolution of the Stasi during German reunification. By the mid-1980s, the Soviet Union, under Mikhail Gorbachev, had largely distanced itself from South Yemen.

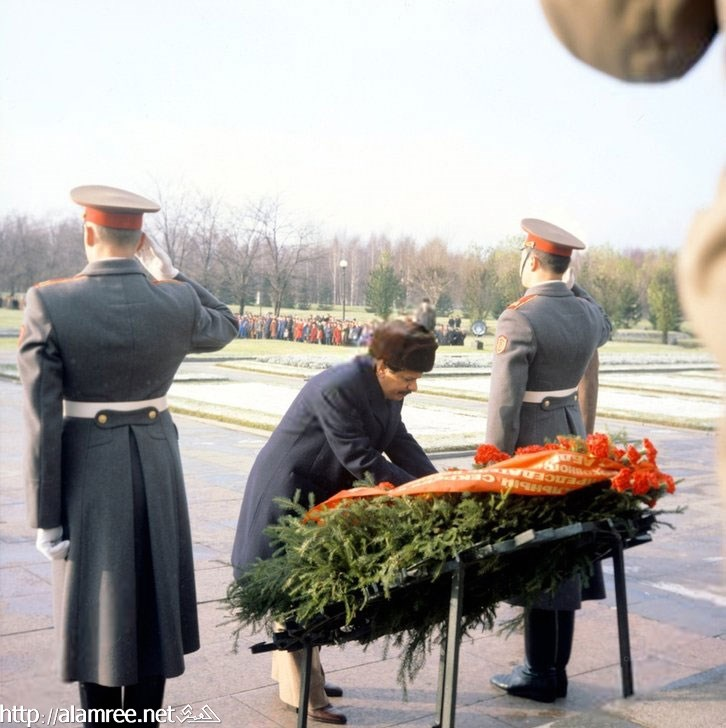
Abdul Fattah Ismail lays a wreath during his visit to the Soviet Union

South Yemen often had an outward foreign policy approach, guided by its state ideology of scientific socialism. This ideological commitment led to its support for ideologically consistent movements within its region. South Yemen would supply the Popular Front for the Liberation of the Occupied Arabian Gulf (PFLOAG), supplying the group with bases in its territory, and logistical and military support for the group, alongside facilitating Soviet aid to PFLOAG. When the PFLOAG began to falter against the Omani government, South Yemen ramped up its support for the group, eventually providing them with Artillery support against the Omani government in 1975, almost dragging the two into conflict. South Yemen also supported the Derg in Ethiopia, once more with the rationale of supporting the growth of a Marxist–Leninist bloc in the Horn of Africa. However, this faltered after Somalia re-aligned with the West in the Ogaden War, leading South Yemen to solely supply the Derg, in line with the Soviet Union and Cuba. This put South Yemen at odds with most of the Arab World.

Relations between South Yemen and several nearby states were poor. Saudi Arabia only established diplomatic relations in 1976, initially hosting pro-British exiles and supporting armed clashes in the border regions of South Yemen. Relations with Oman declined through the 1970s as the South Yemeni government supported the insurgent Marxist Popular Front for the Liberation of Oman (PFLO). Relations with Ba'athist Iraq were also low, as South Yemen offered asylum to several Iraqi communists.

The United States listed South Yemen as a “state sponsor of terrorism” between 1979 and the Yemeni reunification. Diplomatic relations with the United States had been broken on 24 October 1969 because of disagreements with US policy in the Middle East. They were not restored until shortly before reunification.

==== Relations with North Yemen ====
Unlike the early decades of other partitioned states such as East Germany and West Germany, North Korea and South Korea, or North Vietnam and South Vietnam, all of which faced tense relations or sometimes total wars, the relations between the Yemen Arab Republic (North Yemen) and the People's Democratic Republic of Yemen (South Yemen) remained relatively friendly throughout most of their existence, although conflicts did arise. Fighting broke out in 1972, and the short-lived conflict was resolved with negotiations, where it was declared unification would eventually occur.

However, these plans were put on hold in 1979, as the PDRY funded Red rebels in the YAR, and the war was only prevented by an Arab League intervention. The goal of unity was reaffirmed by the northern and southern heads of state during a summit meeting in Kuwait in March 1979.

In 1980, PDRY president Abdul Fattah Ismail resigned and went into exile in Moscow, having lost the confidence of his sponsors in the USSR. His successor, Ali Nasir Muhammad, took a less interventionist stance toward both North Yemen and neighbouring Oman.

=== Administrative divisions ===
Following independence, South Yemen was divided into six governorates (Arabic: محافظات, romanized: muḥāfaẓāt), with roughly natural boundaries. From 1967 to 1978, each was given a name by numeral. The state changed the numeral system in the mid-1980s, and gave the governorates geographical or historical names, ensuring that their borders did not coincide with tribal allegiances. Today, this legacy contributes to misunderstanding and confusion when discussing political issues and allegiances in Yemen. The islands of Kamaran (until 1972, when North Yemen seized it), Perim, Socotra, Abd-el-Kuri, Samha (inhabited), Darsah and others uninhabited from the Socotra archipelago were districts (Arabic: مديريات, romanized: mudīriyyāt) of the First/Aden Governorate being under the Prime Minister's supervision.

The Fifth Governorate was formed in March 1980 after a merger of the Thamud and Hadhramawt governorates.

Size and Population of Governorates (1973 Census)
Numeral (pre-1978)	Name (post-1978)	Capital	Area (km²)	Share of Area	Population	Share of Pop.	Density (pop/km²)	Map of the governorates
I	Aden	Aden	6,980	2%	291,000	18%	41.7	Map of the governorates
II	Lahij	Hawtah	12,766	4%	273,000	17%	21.4	Map of the governorates
III	Abyan	Zinjibar	21,489	6%	311,000	20%	14.5	Map of the governorates
IV	Shabwah	Ataq	73,908	22%	162,000	10%	2.2	Map of the governorates
V	Hadhramawt	Mukalla	155,376	46%	492,000	31%	3.2	Map of the governorates
VI	Al Mahrah	Al Ghaydah	66,350	20%	61,000	4%	0.9	Map of the governorates

== Geography ==
Located at the southwestern corner of the Arabian Peninsula, South Yemen occupied a wedge-shaped territory that tapered toward the Bab al-Mandab strait, the maritime chokepoint between the Red Sea and the Indian Ocean. The country's territorial claims included the volcanic island of Perim within the strait and the larger island of Socotra, a semi-desert landmass situated in the Arabian Sea.

Estimates of the total area of South Yemen varied, with figures ranging from 208,106 square kilometres (80,345 square miles) to 336,869 square kilometres (130,066 square miles). Those figures remain approximate due to the lack of fully demarcated borders with North Yemen and Saudi Arabia, particularly in the southern expanse of the Rub' al Khali. The country's mainland extends along the Gulf of Aden and the Arabian Sea for 1,200 kilometres, from approximately 19° N latitude to 13 N, and from approximately 43 E longitude to 53° E.

The country includes several offshore islands. The most important of these are Perim, located in the middle of the Straits of Bab-el-Mandeb at the southern end of the Red Sea; Kamaran, located 320 km north of Perim, off the coast of the Yemen Arab Republic; and the Socotra Archipelago, located in the Arabian Sea east of the Horn of Africa.

=== Topography and geology ===
The lands of South Yemen are rugged and barren, a fact that played a role in the social, political, and economic development of the region. South Yemen's landscape was shaped by a mountain chain that mirrors the Red Sea coast of the Arabian Peninsula, extending from the Gulf of Aqaba southward to the Bab al-Mandab before curving northeast along the Gulf of Aden and the Arabian Sea toward Ras Musandam at the entrance to the Persian Gulf. This terrain includes a coastal plain of Tihamah, varying in width from a few kilometres to over sixty, which gradually ascends to foothills and then sharply rises to mountain ranges where peaks exceed 2,000 metres.

These mountains, locally known by the term kur (meaning "camel saddle"), are of relatively recent volcanic origin. The highlands primarily consist of metamorphic rocks, with limited presence of limestone and sedimentary formations. Exposed granitic surfaces in the region are often scorched black by intense solar radiation.

=== Territorial changes ===
During the First Yemenite War, North Yemen annexed the Red Sea island of Kamaran from South Yemen.

== Demographics ==
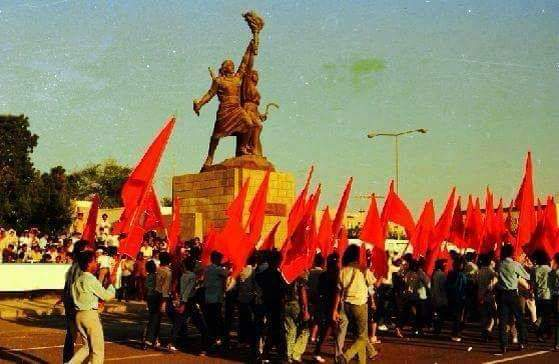
People celebrating the 14th October Revolution next to the Freedom Statue

The population of South Yemen in 1967 did not exceed two million people, while the Yemen Arab Republic exceeded six million. Most of the population of the south was concentrated in the western regions of Lahej and its environs, and these alone constituted more than 60% of the population; 10% were bedouins.

=== Living standards ===
Despite a poor economy, the government ensured a basic level of living standard for all citizens and established a welfare state. Income equality improved, corruption was reduced, and health and educational services expanded. Overall, the population was assured of a basic but adequate living standard for all.

=== Religion ===
The conversion of the Yemeni people to Islam was a gradual and complex process. Although the Persian governor of Yemen converted to Islam in 631 AD, widespread conversion among the population did not happen immediately. Yemen's initial commitment to Islam was relatively superficial. During the first few centuries following the Arab conquests and the relocation of the Islamic caliphates far from Yemen, the region became increasingly marginalised. Islamic teaching and practice were largely confined to a few urban centres, while much of the country remained on the periphery of the Islamic world.

Geography played a significant role in shaping South Yemen's social and political development. The region was characterised by rugged, mountainous terrain that is among the most inhospitable in the region. These natural barriers protected the interior from external influence and allowed local societies to evolve relatively undisturbed. As a result, the spread of Islam in these areas did not fundamentally alter longstanding patterns of land ownership, social hierarchy, or tribal governance.

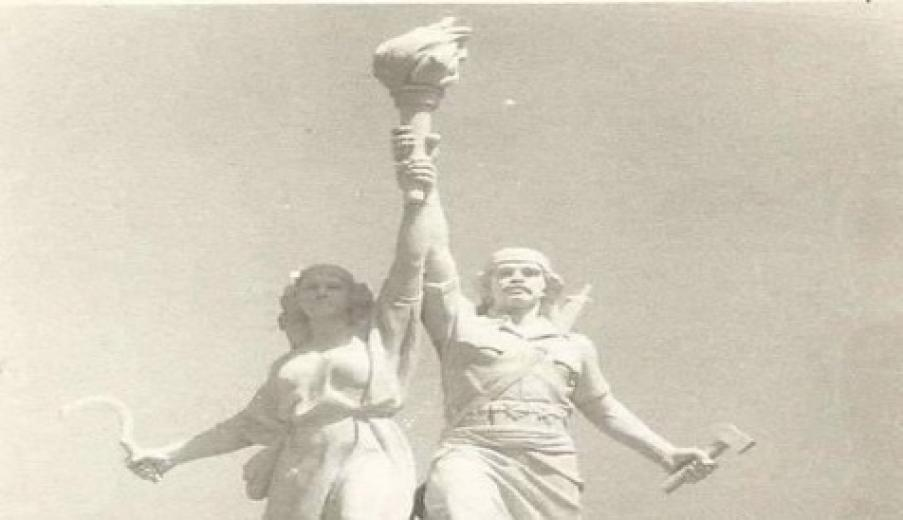
The Freedom Statue in Khor Maksar, Aden

Even as Islam eventually took root in Yemen, many traditional customs and laws persisted. Tribal loyalty continued to serve as the primary organising principle, often taking precedence over both religious and national affiliations. This deep-rooted tribalism was further reinforced by persistent conflicts between rival Islamic sects, which fragmented the religious landscape and hindered the emergence of a unified Islamic identity. Rather than fostering a cohesive sense of community under Islam, these sectarian divisions contributed to a more pragmatic form of faith—one in which religious knowledge was often limited, and adherence to Islamic law was secondary to the authority of tribal customs.

As a result, secular tribal law ('urf), rooted in pre-Islamic tradition, remained more influential than Islamic law (shari'ah). The region's isolation also meant that it escaped the homogenising administrative reforms imposed by the Ottoman Turks, whose control was limited mostly to the port city of Aden. Consequently, Yemen retained a distinct social structure that had evolved well before the Islamic era and persisted despite centuries of nominal Islamic rule.

South Yemen had a dual-sided approach to religion. State policy officially promoted Islam as the state religion, and government leaders performed public displays of religious observance to deflect accusations of anti-Islamism. However, the state also worked to diminish the role of religion in everyday life, especially that which it considered to be 'popular' Islam out of alignment with the official creed. Sharia was replaced with secular law in personal and many other matters. Legal interpretation was often the province of secular officials, and the independence of sheikhs was limited by government control of religious trusts and mosque funds.

=== Education ===
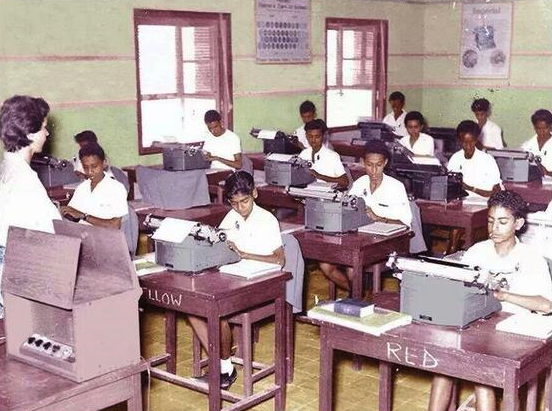
A classroom in Aden

Democratic Yemen had a "National Science Day" on 10 September.

According to the UNESCO in 1985, education in Democratic Yemen was considered the best in the Arabian Peninsula and 98% of the population were considered literate. Adult literacy in Arab Republic of Yemen in 1980 was 40%.

=== Sports ===
In 1976, the South Yemen national football team participated in the AFC Asian Cup, where the team lost to Iraq 1–0 and to Iran 8–0. They entered their only World Cup qualification campaign in 1986 and were knocked out in the first round by Bahrain. On 2 September 1965, South Yemen played their first international match in the 4th Arab Games against the United Arab Republic, to whom they lost 14–0. On 5 November 1989, South Yemen played its last international match against Guinea, to whom they lost 1–0. The team stopped playing when the North and South united in 1990 to form the modern state of Yemen.

In 1988, the South Yemen Olympic team made its debut in the Summer Olympics in Seoul. Sending only five athletes, the country won no medals. This was the only time the country went to the Olympics until unification in 1990.

=== Women's rights ===
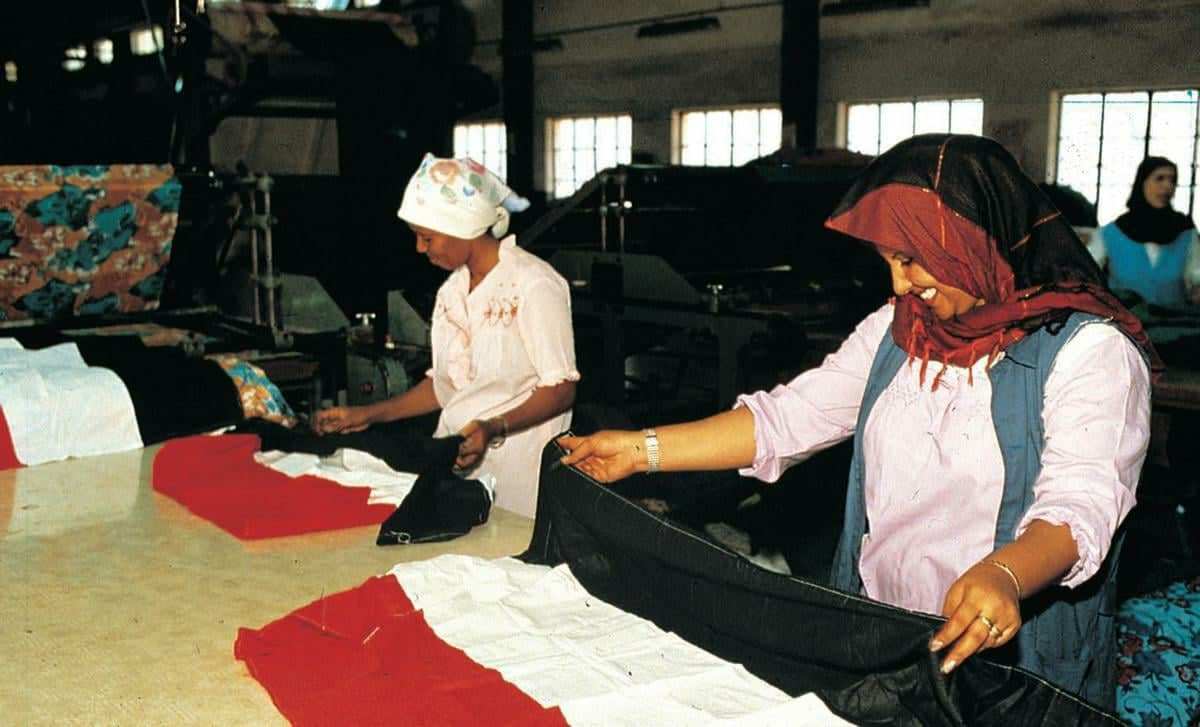
Yemeni women sewing flags

Women's rights under the socialist government were widely regarded as the most progressive in the region. Following the National Front's (NF) adoption of Marxist–Leninist principles in 1968, the South Yemeni government actively promoted the emancipation of women as part of its broader ideological goals. In 1978, the NF was renamed the Yemeni Socialist Party and implemented a series of social and legal reforms inspired by Eastern European models, many of which directly affected the status of women.

The General Union of Yemeni Women played a central role in advancing gender equality and was closely integrated into both the party and state apparatus. Women from the union held positions across all levels of the ruling party's structure, including representation within its central and regional committees.

Significant legal changes were introduced to dismantle religious and traditional restrictions on women. The 1974 Family Law curtailed polygamy, abolished unilateral male divorce (talaq), upheld a woman's right to child custody after divorce, and prohibited both early and non-consensual marriages. These reforms also banned arranged marriages, and transferred jurisdiction over personal status issues from religious authorities to state institutions. Women were granted full legal equality with men, and equal rights in divorce were codified.

Beyond legislation, the state pursued a broader cultural and social transformation. Women were actively encouraged to participate in sectors traditionally reserved for men, including the military, judiciary, and political spheres. Education and workforce integration were seen as key to achieving women's emancipation. From independence onward, girls and women had access to all levels of education, including technical and vocational training. A major literacy campaign between 1972 and 1976 prioritised female participation. These efforts contributed to South Yemen achieving one of the highest female labour force participation rates in the Arab world at the time.

== Economy ==
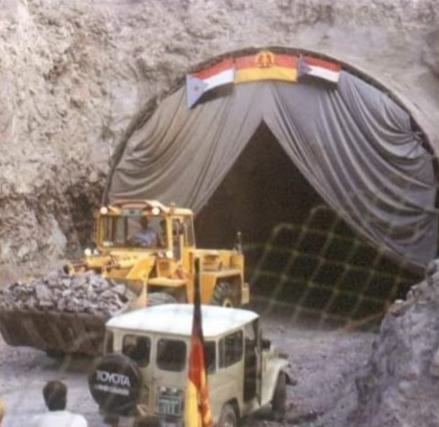
GDR working on infrastructure projects in South Yemen

During British rule, economic development in South Yemen was restricted to the city of Aden, focused mainly on the port and on the British military bases. As a result, following the British withdrawal, there here was little to no industrial output or mineral wealth exploitation in the country until the mid-1980s, when significant petroleum reserves in the central regions near Shibam and Mukalla were discovered. Foreign aid was minimal, as the British government did not fulfil promises of aid and the Soviet Union offered only US$152 million from 1969 to 1980. By 1990, roughly 45 percent of both North and South Yemen's national debts were owed to the Soviet Union, chiefly for military equipment.

South Yemen's nationalisation policies and land reforms helped establish a modern state sector and significantly reduced inequalities in land ownership. The main sources of income were agriculture, mostly fruit, cereal crops, cattle and sheep, and fishing. The government guaranteed full employment in agriculture for rural citizens, and established a number of collective farms; however, those set up following the Soviet model produced poorer results than cooperative-run farms.

The national budget was 13.43 million dinars in 1976, and the gross national product was US$650 - 500 million. The total national debt was $52.4 million.

=== Economic policy ===
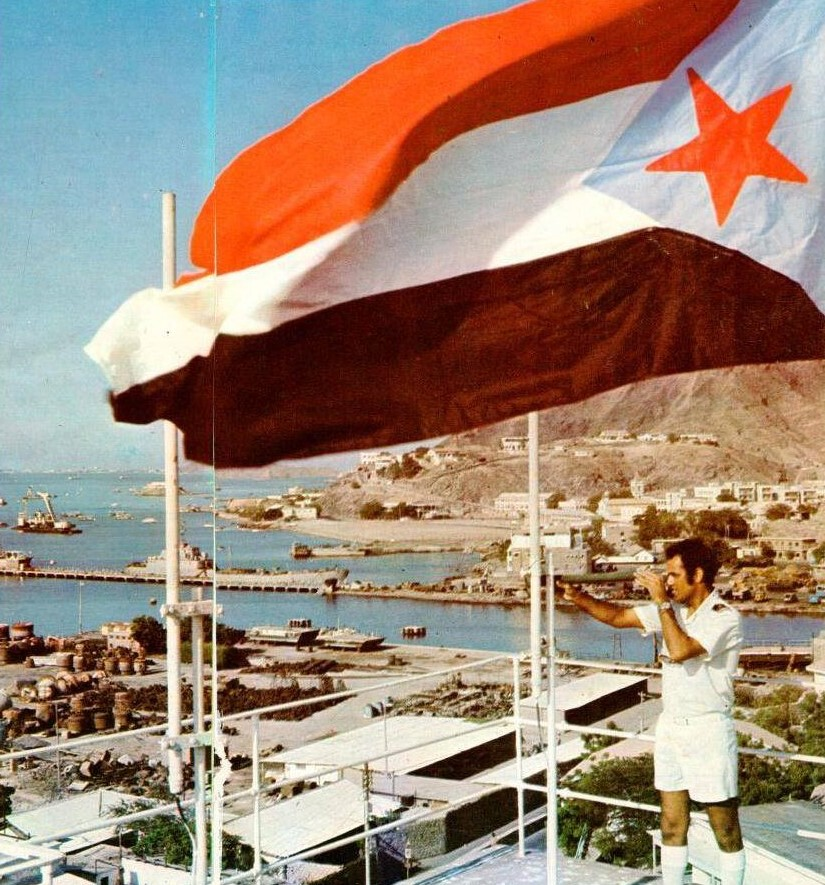
Port of Aden

Limited natural resources posed challenges to the economic development of the People's Democratic Republic of Yemen (PDRY). Despite this constraint, significant, albeit modest, oil reserves were discovered shortly after the country's unification in 1990. However, the YSP government did not benefit from oil exports to fund its development initiatives.

Over time, economic policies in the PDRY underwent a transformation, shifting from an initial focus on developing the state sector to promoting cooperative and joint private-public enterprises. By the late 1980s, there was a notable presence of industries in Aden and around Al Mukalla in Hadramawt, producing a range of essential goods such as plastics, batteries, cigarettes, matches, tomato paste, dairy products, and fish canning.

Within the industrial sector, the state implemented welfarist labour laws that were widely enforced. These laws included regulations aimed at safeguarding women in the workforce by prohibiting night shifts and hazardous occupations. Additionally, the legislation ensured that workers received salaries that enabled them to maintain reasonable living standards. Trade unions in the PDRY primarily functioned as state entities rather than as negotiating bodies, playing a significant role in upholding labour regulations and standards.

=== Oil ===
A few months after the civil war of 1986, the PDRY had discovered oil after more than 6 decades of unsuccessful exploration, the Soviet Union discovered oil in the Shabwah Governorate in late 1986, marking a turning point for the resource-scarce nation. Decades of unsuccessful exploration efforts, hampered by the harsh desert environment and political instability, had left South Yemen heavily reliant on foreign aid, primarily from the Soviet Union, and remittances from its citizens working abroad, estimated to be around half of government revenue by the mid-1980s. The discovery, made by the Soviet oil company Technoexport, emerged amidst the Cold War, with the Soviet Union playing a crucial role in the exploration and discovery process.

In the 1980s, Technoexport contracted with the PDRY to search for oil in a 13,500-square-mile area in Shabwa, and, in 1984, launched a programme of exploratory drilling. This Soviet effort yielded only traces of oil over the next two years, a sharp contrast to the discovery and rapid exploitation of oil in the same period by an American company, Hunt Oil, in the YAR's Marib basin, an area just to the west of Shabwa. Then, in late 1986, the Soviets struck very high quality oil in western Shabwa, an occurrence confirmed by authorities in Aden in early 1987.

By late March, Initial estimates placed the oil reserves at around 1 billion barrels, sparking plans for pipeline construction and full-scale production of the oil fields. Events moved swiftly, and industry sources reported in mid-1987 that the three fields—lyad East, lyad West, and Amal—already had a productive capacity of 10,000 barrels per day (bpd), that between 5,000 and 10,000 bpd were being trucked to the Aden refinery, and that there were plans to increase the number of trucks on the oil run to bring deliveries up to 25,000 bpd, considerably more than the PDRY's total domestic need at the time. The discovery was viewed as a potential pathway to reduce dependence on external sources of income and improve the lives of South Yemen's roughly 2.4 million citizens. However, the joy of discovery was accompanied by a multitude of challenges.

Western Shabwa was not the only exploration area, and the Soviet Union was not the only explorer in the second half of the 1980s. Replying to a claim that the PDRY had put all of its eggs in one basket, Deputy Prime Minister and Minister of Energy and Minerals Salih Abu-Bakr ibn Husaynun noted in late 1987 that eight Western and Arab companies were engaged in exploration efforts in several areas in the PDRY. Although Italy's Agip stopped work in late 1985, Brazil's Braspetrol, France's Societe Nationale Elf Aquitaine (Elf) and Compagnie Française des Petroles (Total), Kuwait's Independent Petroleum Group, and Canadian Occidental were among the firms actively searching for oil in the years that followed.

The Soviet involvement in the discovery, estimated to have cost over half a billion dollars and added to South Yemen's already staggering debt, raised concerns about potential political and economic influence in the region. Additionally, the oil find added a layer of complexity to the already intricate relationship between South and North Yemen, both of which desired unification and saw the resource, estimated to hold the potential for substantial economic benefits, as a potential driver of economic prosperity.

Furthermore, South Yemen grappled with internal political struggles and social unrest at the time of the discovery. The violent leadership struggle within the ruling communist party, culminating in the January 1986 "blood bath" in Aden, further destabilised the nation. This volatile political landscape cast a shadow over the potential benefits of the newfound oil wealth and raised questions about how the resources would be managed and distributed fairly within the nation.

=== Airlines ===
The following airlines had operated from the PDRY:

- The Brothers Air Services was formed by Sayid Zein A. Baharoon who used the "Brothers" nomenclature in his merchant enterprises. Known as BASCO, this fledgling airline lasted only a short time. It operated from 1967 to 1971 before its assets were nationalised and incorporated into the newly created Alyemda Airline.
- Alyemda – Democratic Yemen Airlines (1971–1996). Joined Yemenia, the airline of the former YAR.

== Legacy ==
According to journalist Bilal Zenab Ahmed, nostalgia remains strong in parts of southern Yemen for the PDRY. Ahmed compared nostalgia for South Yemen to nostalgia for the Soviet Union, noting their shared emphasis on cultural memory and ongoing impact on modern-day nationalism. Ahmed asserted that nostalgia for the perceived stability, social benefits, and low unemployment of South Yemen have played a strong role in support for modern-day South Yemeni separatism. The Southern Movement in particular drew much of its initial support from elements of the southern Yemeni population nostalgic for the former Marxist government, and socialist nostalgia features subtly in much of its messaging, propaganda, and symbolism.

Political scholar Anne-Linda Amira Augustin asserted that nostalgia for the PDRY is primarily driven by nostalgia for state-sponsored social benefits, namely free healthcare, an educational system with relatively high standards, low unemployment, and provision of social security. Augustin found in her research that communist nostalgia has experienced a resurgence among younger Yemenis born since 1990 who cannot remember the South Yemeni government, but are disillusioned with the social and political conditions since the country's unification.

== See also ==
- Dhofar rebellion
- Democratic Yemeni Union of Peasants
- Southern Movement
- Southern Transitional Council
