= Ar Raydah Wa Qusayar district =

Ar Raydah Wa Qusayar District
- District
- Interactive map of Ar Raydah Wa Qusayar District
- Coordinates: 15°10′N 50°20′E
- Country: Yemen
- Governorate: Hadhramaut

Population (2021)
  - Total: 71,318
- Time zone: UTC+3 (Yemen Standard Time)

Ar Raydah Wa Qusayar District is a district of the Hadhramaut Governorate, Yemen. As of 2021, the district had a population of 71,318 inhabitants.
