= Yasin Said Numan =

Yemen politician (born 1947)

His Excellency Yassin Saeed Noman
- ياسين سعيد نعمان
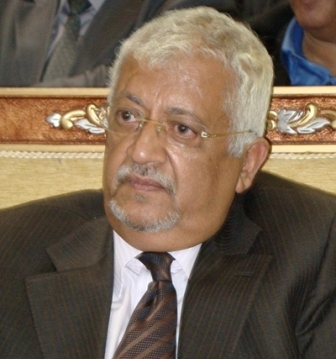
- Noman in 2009

Ambassador of Yemen to the United Kingdom
- Incumbent
- Assumed office 25 May 2015

President of the House of Representatives of Yemen
- In office 1990–1993
- Preceded by: Position established
- Succeeded by: Abdullah ibn Husayn al-Ahmar

Prime Minister of South Yemen
- In office 8 February 1986 – 22 May 1990
- Preceded by: Haidar Abu Bakr al-Attas
- Succeeded by: Position abolished

Personal details
- Born: 21 March 1947 (age 79) Aden Protectorate
- Party: Yemeni Socialist Party

Yasin Said Numan (Arabic: ياسين سعيد نعمان; born 21 March 1947) is the former General Secretary of the Yemeni Socialist Party from 2005 to 2015. He is the current ambassador of Yemen to the United Kingdom since 2015. Previously, he served as the Prime Minister of South Yemen from February 1986 until the Yemeni unification in May 1990.

Numan joined the Yemeni National Front, which later became the Yemeni Socialist Party, when he was 17. In 1986 he became the Prime Minister of the People's Democratic Republic of Yemen from February 1986 until Yemeni unification in 1990, under Chairman Haidar Abu Bakr al-Attas, who preceded Numan as Prime Minister. Numan had previously been Minister of Fisheries and Deputy Prime Minister.

After the Unification of Yemen Numan became the interim Speaker of Parliament, until the parliamentary election of 1993 when he was replaced by Abdullah ibn Husayn al-Ahmar. He became the General Secretary of the Yemeni Socialist Party in 2005.

During the Yemeni Revolution of 2011, Numan was critical of President Ali Abdullah Saleh and supported a plan by the GCC for Saleh to step down. He escaped from an assassination attempt in August 2012; he was one of several Socialist Party politicians targeted during 2012.

Preceded by Haidar Abu Bakr al-Attas	Prime Minister of South Yemen; 1986–1990	Succeeded by none
