= Abdullah Badheeb =

Yemeni writer

al-Rafīq Abduallah Badheeb
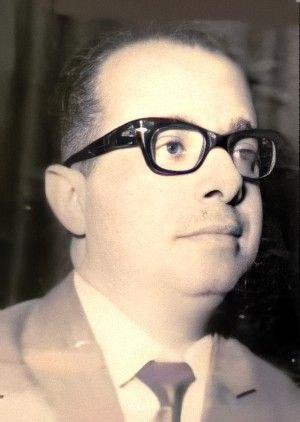

Personal details
- Born: 1931 Ash-Shihr, Quaiti
- Died: August 16, 1976 (aged 44–45)

Abdullah Abdulrazzaq Badheeb (1931 – August 16, 1976) was a Yemeni socialist writer, theorist, journalist and politician, and one of the leaders of the Marxist faction of the National Liberation Front in southern Yemen during the late 20th century that sought to free southern Yemen from the British occupation. Badheeb played a major role in the dialogue between the national factions in the occupied southern Yemen at the time, which led to their unification and the formation of the paramilitary political organization called the National Liberation Front that succeeded in liberating southern Yemen and establishing the South Yemen state, which later evolved into the Yemeni Socialist Party. Badheeb's presence was always noticeable in Aden with his ability to persuade, attract, debate, organize, spread reassurance and hope, and motivate the people around him.

== Biography ==
He was born in Al-Shahr area in Hadhramout governorate in 1931, he received his elementary, preparatory, and secondary education in Aden and obtained two degrees from the Bazara's charitable school in Hadhramout, he then joined highschool, and had to drop out in the final year due to personal and family related circumstances in 1951. Despite this, Abdullah Badheeb, due to his intellectualness, managed to draw attention to himself in the country while he was still a student. His knowledge varied between literature, history, philosophy, and politics.
