= Haidar Abu Bakr al-Attas =

Prime Minister of Yemen

al-Rafīq Haidar Abu Bakr al-Attas
- حيدر أبو بكر العطاس

1st Prime Minister of Yemen
- In office 22 May 1990 – 9 May 1994
- President: Ali Abdullah Saleh
- Preceded by: Office created
- Succeeded by: Muhammad Said al-Attar

Chairman of the Presidium of Supreme People's Council
- In office 24 January 1986 – 22 May 1990; Interim: 24 January 1986 – 6 November 1986
- Preceded by: Ali Nasir Muhammad
- Succeeded by: Office abolished (Ali Abdullah Saleh as Chairman of the Presidential Council)

5th Prime Minister of South Yemen
- In office 14 February 1985 – 8 February 1986
- Preceded by: Ali Nasir Muhammad
- Succeeded by: Yasin Said Numan

Personal details
- Born: 5 April 1939 (age 86)
- Party: Yemeni Socialist Party
- Awards: Order of the Badge of Honour

Haidar Abu Bakr al-Attas (Arabic: حيدر أبو بكر العطاس; born 5 April 1939) is a Yemeni politician. He was appointed Prime Minister of Yemen by President Ali Abdullah Saleh when the People's Democratic Republic of Yemen and Yemen Arab Republic united in 1990 to form present-day Yemen. Al-Attas served until 1994. He is a member of the Yemeni Socialist Party.

Before unification, al-Attas served as Prime Minister (1985–1986) and Chairman of the Presidium of the Supreme People's Council (President of people's Democratic Republic of Yemen) (1986–1990) in the southern PDRY.

When Aden in southern Yemen seceded in May 1994, al-Attas served as the Prime Minister of the secessionist Democratic Republic of Yemen until the rebellion ended less than two months later.

Political offices
Preceded by Ali Nasir Muhammad	Prime Minister of South Yemen; 1985–1986	Succeeded by Yasin Said Numan
Preceded by Ali Nasir Muhammad	Chairman of the Presidium of Supreme People's Council (South Yemen); 1986–1990	Succeeded by Office abolished (Ali Abdullah Saleh as Chairman of the Presidential Council of Yemen)
Preceded by Office established	Prime Minister of Yemen; 1990–1994	Succeeded by Muhammad Said al-Attar
