= Supreme People's Council (South Yemen) =

Legislature, 1970–1990

Supreme People's Council مجلس الشعب الأعلى

Type
- Type: Unicameral

History
- Established: 1970
- Disbanded: 1990
- Preceded by: Legislative Council of Aden

Structure
- Seats: 111
- Political groups: Yemeni Socialist Party (71); Independents (40)
- Length of term: 5 years

Elections
- Voting system: First-past-the-post
- Last election: 28–30 October 1986

The Supreme People's Council (SPC) was the highest organ of state power of the People's Democratic Republic of Yemen (South Yemen). According to the 1970 Constitution legislative power was vested the unicameral Supreme People's Council, which consisted of 111 elected members. The SPC approved an amended version of the 1970 constitution in October 1978. Most significantly, it recognized the 'leader role' of the YSP in the administration of the state. It defined the role of the YSP as follows: "The Yemeni Socialist Party, armed with the theory of scientific socialism, is the leader and guide of the society and of the State. It shall define the general horizon for development of the society and the line of the State's domestic and foreign policy. The Yemeni Socialist Party shall lead the struggle of the people and their mass organizations towards the absolute victory of the Yemeni revolution's strategy and the achievement of the tasks of the national democratic revolution through socialist construction."

Prior to the 1978 elections, the SPC was composed by 101 representatives appointed by the Supreme General Command from party's members, professional groups, and trade-unions.

While the single party system prevented the candidature of other parties, electors were presented numerous independent candidates who were not YSP members. The first elections held to determine the composition of the Supreme People's Council were held in December 1978. 71 members of the Yemen Socialist Party and 40 independents. Candidates stood for constituencies with which they had no particular personal connection; this measure was designed to prevent the re-emergence of 'tribalist' or regionalist tendencies in government. The Supreme People's Council met about four times a year, with elections held every five years. In Democratic Yemen, the SPC enacted laws, approved treaties, discussed economic plans. It elected from among its members the Prime Minister; the SPC also elected 11 of 17 members of the Presidium of the SPC (the remaining six are appointed by the President of the Presidium). Given the dominant role of the Yemeni Socialist Party (YSP) in the state, the policies of the SPC generally mirrored YSP inspired directives. But one must not make the mistake of regarding the SPC as a mere rubber stamp. Discussion and debate were once vigorous and lively. All members, including representatives who were not members of the YSP, scrutinized and, if necessary, amended pieces of legislation.

The Chairman of the Presidium of the Supreme People's Council was also the head of state of South Yemen 1978–1990.

== Chairmen of the Presidium of the People's Council ==
Name	Took office	Left office	Ref.
Abdul Fattah Ismail	1970	21 April 1980	
Ali Nasir Muhammad	21 April 1980	24 January 1986	
Haidar Abu Bakr al-Attas	24 January 1986	22 May 1990	

== See also ==
- List of speakers of the House of Representatives of Yemen
