= Yemeni Socialist Party =

Political party in Yemen

Yemeni Socialist Party الحزب الاشتراكي اليمني
- Abbreviation: YSP
- General Secretary: Abdulrahman Al-Saqqaf
- Founder: Abdul Fattah Ismail
- Founded: 13 October 1978 (48 years, 29 days)
- Merger of: National Front; People's Vanguard Party; People's Democratic Union; Yemeni Popular Unity Party
- Headquarters: Assafi'yah district, Sanaa
- Youth wing: Asheed
- Ideology: Social democracy; Islamic socialism; Progressivism; Arab nationalism; Pan-Arabism; Secularism; Faction: Pro-Houthi; Anti-imperialism; 1978–1994: Scientific socialism (official); Communism; Marxism–Leninism; Republicanism; Revolutionary socialism; Elements (1978–1994): Arab-Islamic nationalism; Ba'athism; Maoism
- Political position: Centre-left to left-wing; 1978–1994: Left-wing to far-left
- Regional affiliation: Arab Social Democratic Forum
- International affiliation: Progressive Alliance; Socialist International
- Colours: Red; Sky blue
- House of Representatives: 8 / 301

Election symbol

Party flag
- Flag of the Yemeni Socialist Party Other flag

Website
- aleshteraky.com

The Yemeni Socialist Party (Arabic: الحزب الاشتراكي اليمني, romanized: al-Ḥizb al-Ishtirākī al-Yamanī; YSP), also known as the Socialist Party Organization (منظمة الحزب الاشتراكي, Munaẓẓamat al-Ḥizb al-Ishtirākī), is an opposition political party in Yemen. Originally Marxist–Leninist, the party has gradually evolved into a social democratic opposition party in today's Republic of Yemen.

The successor of the National Front, it was the sole legal political party in South Yemen until the Yemeni unification in 1990. The YSP is one of two Marxist–Leninist parties in the Islamic world to emerge as a governing party, the other being the People's Democratic Party of Afghanistan.

== History ==
=== Background ===
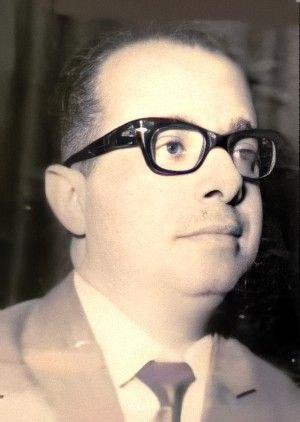
Abdullah Badheeb, theorist of the Marxist Popular Democratic Union

In 1963, against the backdrop of the September Revolution in North Yemen that occurred a year earlier, the National Liberation Front (NLF) was created in the Aden Protectorate. The NLF waged an armed struggle against the British for independence. The main groups leading the uprising were the Front for the Liberation of Occupied South Yemen (or FLOSY) and the National Liberation Front (or NLF). A power struggle ensued between the two, with the NLF eventually winning.

The British declared a state of emergency and tried to hold on to Aden for years, but eventually withdrew on 30 November 1967, where the United Kingdom ended its occupation and handed power over to the NLF.

On 22 June 1969, during the Corrective Move, an internal bloodless coup took place when the left wing of the ruling NLF under the leadership of Abdul Fattah Ismail and Salem Rubai Ali, overthrew the then-president of South Yemen and leader of the right-wing faction, Qahtan Muhammad al-Shaabi, and purged the party from the Nasserists. after which South Yemen officially became a Marxist–Leninist state. In 1975, members of the "National Front," along with left-wing Ba'athists from the Popular Vanguard Party and Marxists from the Popular Democratic Union Party, joined the Unified Political Organization - National Front (UPONF). The NLF then renamed itself to the "National Front" and in 1978 became the Yemeni Socialist Party. All other political parties were amalgamated into the Yemeni Socialist Party too, which became the only legal party.

=== Formation of the Party ===
The emblem of the Yemeni Socialist party from 1978 to 1990

National Liberation Front
People's Vanguard Party	National Front	Popular Democratic Union
Unified Political Organization of the National Front (1975-1978)
Yemeni Socialist Party

The predecessors of the Yemeni Socialist Party

The party was established by Abdul Fattah Ismail in 1978 following a unification process of several Yemeni revolutionary groups in both South and North Yemen. The core of the YSP came from the United Political Organization of the National Front – itself the result of the merger of three parties, namely the National Front (NF), the Democratic Popular Union Party (Marxist) and the Popular Vanguard Party (a left-wing Ba'athist party) – and the Yemeni Popular Unity Party in North Yemen, which had itself emerged from the merger of five left-wing organisations, namely the Revolutionary Democratic Party of Yemen, the Popular Vanguard Party in North Yemen, the Organisation of Yemeni Revolutionary Resistors, the Popular Democratic Union and the Labour Party.

The 1st Congress of the new party, which led to the party's creation and approved its program documents, took place on 13–14 October 1978. The charter proclaimed that the party as "the vanguard of the Yemeni working class in alliance with the peasantry and other strata of the working people. The party unites in its ranks on a voluntary militant basis the most progressive and conscious elements of the working class, peasantry, soldiers, revolutionary intelligentsia, and all those who accept the party's political program."

According to the Charter, the theoretical basis of the YSP is scientific socialism. The goal of the party was "the construction of a unified democratic Yemen with a socialist perspective." The program viewed the YSP as the leading and guiding force "in the struggle for the full implementation of the tasks of the national-democratic revolution and the transition to a new stage." Abdul Fattah Ismail was elected General Secretary of the YSP Central Committee. The sole legal party in the country, the YSP won all 111 seats in the parliamentary elections in December 1978.

=== Governance of the PDRY ===
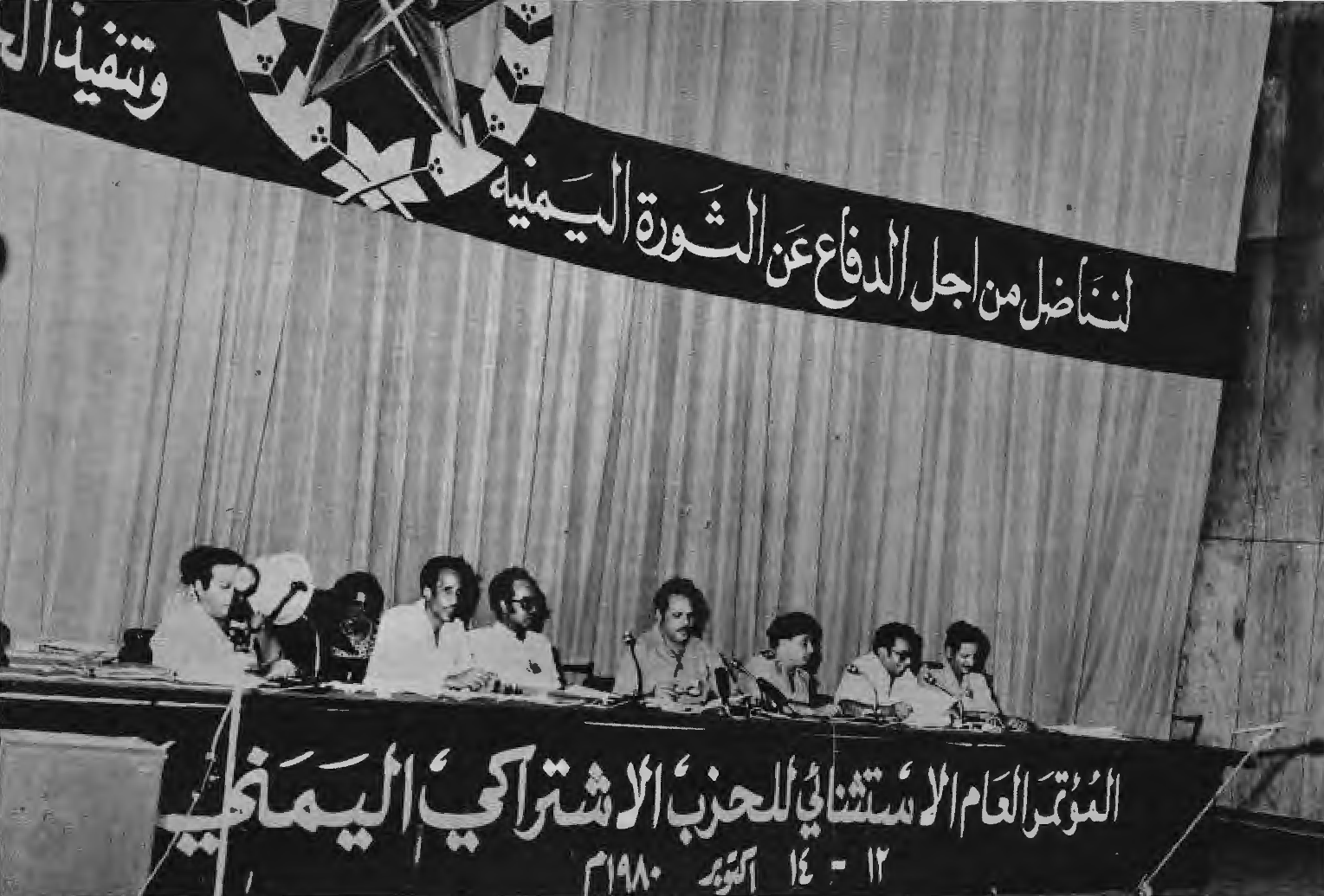
1980 Extraordinary Yemeni Socialist Party conference

While in power, the YSP was beset by internal disagreements. On 11 August 1979, as part of an intra-factional struggle, 5 prominent party figures were dismissed: Interior Minister Salih Muslih Qasim, Foreign Minister Muhammad Salih Mutiyya, State Security Minister Sayyid Abdallah, Industry and Planning Minister Abdelaziz Abd-Al-Wali, and Fisheries Minister Muhammad Salim Akkush.

The membership of the YSP reached 25,000 by the early 1980s. In October 1980, an extraordinary 2nd Congress of the YSP was held, which confirmed the course toward a socialist orientation.

In April 1980, head of party and state Abdul Fattah Ismail, under pressure from internal party forces and with the consent of the USSR, resigned "for health reasons" and went into exile in Moscow. He was replaced as President of South Yemen by Ali Nasser Mohammed, who was seen as a more moderate and conciliatory leader compared to the pro-Soviet line of his predecessor. He sought to improve relations with South Yemen's Arab neighbours and the West.

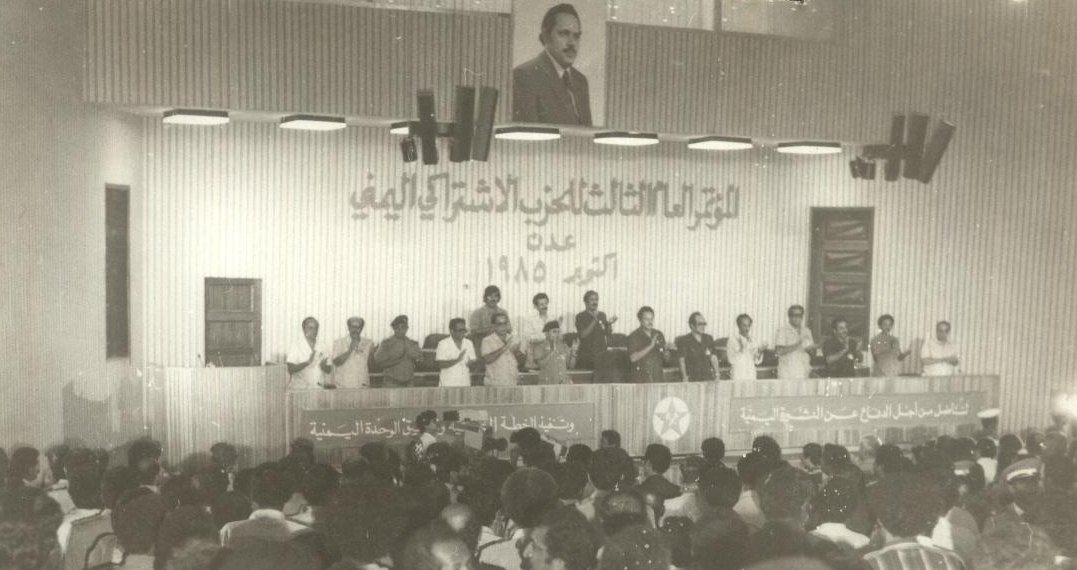
Third YSP Congress under the portrait of Ali Nasser Mohammed (1985)

At the 3rd Congress of the YSP on 11–13 October 1985, the quantitative and qualitative growth of the party ranks was noted. In December 1980, it had 19,198 members and candidates, and by June 1985, there were already 32,786. Workers made up 14.8% of members and candidates, peasants 9.6%, intelligentsia 20.6%, and office workers/military 55%.

Due to tensions within the party, in June 1985, the YSP Politburo adopted a resolution stating that anyone who resorts to violence in resolving internal political disputes would be considered a criminal and a traitor to the motherland.

Conflict between the two factions of the YSP led to the South Yemen Civil War in 1986, which led to the death of Abdul Fattah Ismail, although his ally Ali Salem al-Beidh took control of the party, while the more moderate Haidar Abu Bakr al-Attas became president. Al-Beidh and al-Attas would occupy positions in the government of a reunified Yemen until the 1994 civil war. Parliamentary elections were held in October 1986, and although the YSP remained the sole legal party, independent candidates were allowed to contest the elections, winning 40 of the 111 seats, with the YSP winning the other 71.

=== Unified Yemen ===
Surviving many upheavals and civil strife in Yemen, the collapse of the Soviet Union, and the crisis of international socialism, the YSP was instrumental in achieving Yemeni unity and the establishment of multi-party democracy in the Republic of Yemen in May 1990. In the first parliamentary elections in unified Yemen in 1993, the YSP won 56 of the 301 seats, finishing third behind the General People's Congress (GPC) and al-Islah. The three parties subsequently formed a coalition government.

Following the 1994 civil war the party's infrastructure and resources were confiscated by the GPC government and its cadres and members were regularly subjected to unwarranted arrests and torture. It boycotted the 1997 parliamentary elections, and was unable to nominate a candidate for the 1999 presidential elections, as any potential candidate required the backing of 31 MPs. In 2002 it was one of five parties to form the Joint Meeting Parties opposition alliance, it returned to contest the 2003 parliamentary elections, it received only 3.8% of the popular vote and won eight seats.

After the 1994 civil war, when YSP leaders proclaimed the Democratic Republic of Yemen in the south, the party was suppressed and its property confiscated. The party boycotted the 1997 elections. In 2002, it joined the "Joint Meeting Parties" (JMP) opposition alliance. In 2003, it received only 3.8% of the vote.

The Joint Meeting Parties nominated Faisal Bin Shamlan as their candidate for the 2006 presidential elections. However, he was defeated by the incumbent President Ali Abdullah Saleh of the GPC.

==== Yemeni Civil War and split into two factions ====
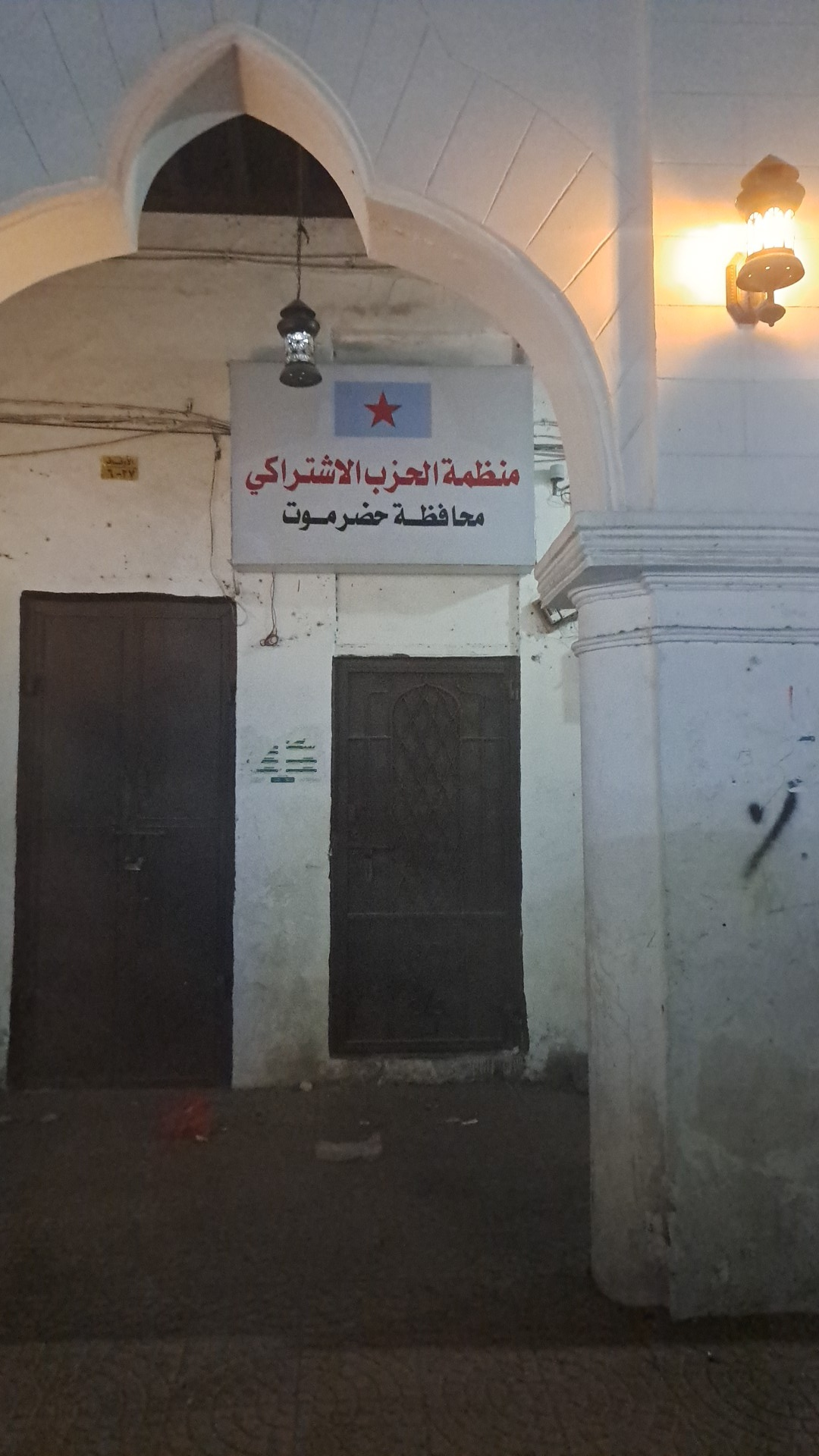
Yemeni Socialist Party HQ in Mukalla, 2024

Ahead of the 2012 National Dialogue Conference, designed to deescalate the crisis in Yemen, the party publicly endorsed the implementation of Sharia in Yemen, in a break from the party's secularist origins.

Following the outbreak of the Yemeni Civil War, the party split into two factions; one remained in Yemen and labelled itself the "YSP – Anti-Aggression" and declared its loyalty to the Houthis and their leader Abd al-Malik al-Houthi, while much of the party's leadership, including Abdulrahman al-Saqqaf and Yasin Said Numan, went into exile in Riyadh and backed the government of Abdrabbuh Mansour Hadi. After the split, the "Anti-Aggression" faction issued statements that they consider the leadership in Riyadh to have been expelled from the party for their support of the Saudi-led intervention in Yemen, calling for their punishment as a result.

The "Anti-Aggression" faction declared its opposition to the Saudi-led coalition, vowing to aid the Houthis in defeating it. Notably, this faction of the YSP actively helped facilitate the Houthi entry into Ta'izz during the battle for the city, one of the YSP's historic centers. In 2016, it denounced the United Nations for removing Saudi Arabia from the list of countries responsible for harming children. They also condemned the Trump administration's decision to designate the Houthis as a terrorist group.

The pro-Coalition faction of the YSP led by Abdulrahman al-Saqqaf was given two ministers in the Yemeni cabinet following the Riyadh Agreement. In 2018, they condemned the STC takeover of Aden and affirmed their support for Hadi's government, calling on Saudi Arabia to intervene in order to reverse the situation. They have, however, also criticized Hadi's government at times, and in 2021, amidst the Houthi assault on Ma'rib, they issued a joint statement with Al-Islah and several smaller parties condemning the government for "[failing] to shoulder its responsibility in the political, military, economic and media fields".

== Ideology ==
Originally a Marxist–Leninist vanguard party, the YSP has since moved away from communism and adopted pan-Arab nationalism and social democracy as its main ideologies. The party also supports the implementation of rule of law in Yemen.

== Congresses ==
- 1st Congress (11–13 October 1978)
- 2nd Extraordinary Congress (12–14 October 1980)
- 3rd Congress (11–13 October 1985)
- 4th Congress, 1st Session (27 November – 1 December 1998)
- 4th Congress, 2nd Session (30 August – 1 September 2000)
- 5th Congress (26–31 July 2005)

== General secretaries ==
General Secretary of the Central Committee of the Yemeni Socialist Party
No.	Officeholder		Took office	Left office	Length of tenure	Term	Birth	PM	Death	Ref.
1		Abdul Fattah Ismail (عبد الفتاح إسماعيل)	13 October 1978	20 April 1980	1 year, 190 days	1st (1978–1980)	1939	1978	1986	
2		Ali Nasir Muhammad (علي ناصر محمد)	21 April 1980	24 January 1986	5 years, 278 days	1st–2nd (1978–1986)	1939	1978	Alive	
3		Ali Salem al-Beidh (علي سالم البيض)	6 February 1986	7 July 1994	8 years, 151 days	3rd (1986–1998)	1939	1978	2026	
4	—	Ali Saleh Obad (علي صالح عباد)	September 1994	31 July 2005	10 years, 333 days	3rd–4th (1986–2005)	1942	1978	2019	
5		Yasin Said Numan (ياسين سعيد نعمان)	31 July 2005	19 December 2014	9 years, 141 days	5th (2005–present)	1947	1978	Alive	
6	—	Abdulrahman Al-Saqqaf (عبد الرحمن السقاف)	19 December 2014	Incumbent	11 years, 327 days	5th (2005–present)	1956	?	Alive	

== Electoral history ==
=== South Yemeni parliamentary elections ===
Election	Party leader	Votes	%	Seats	+/–	Position	Outcome
1978	Abdul Fattah Ismail	596,787	100%	111 / 111	▲111	▲1st	Sole legal party
1986	Ali Salem al-Beidh	unknown	unknown	71 / 111	▼40	1st	Sole legal party

=== House of Representatives elections ===
Election	Party leader	Votes	%	Seats	+/–	Position	Outcome
1993	Haidar Abu Bakr al-Attas	413,984	18.54%	56 / 301	▲56	▲2nd	Opposition
1997	Haidar Abu Bakr al-Attas	Boycotted		0 / 301	▼56		Extra-parliamentary
2003	Ali Salih 'Ubad Muqbil	277,223	4.69%	7 / 301	▲7	▲3rd	Opposition

== See also ==
- Popular Resistance Committees (Yemen)
- Southern Movement
