= List of Yemen-related topics =

This is a list of topics related to Yemen.

== Yemen ==
- Yemen
- A New Day in Old Sana'a
- Culture of Yemen
- Greater Yemen

== Cities in Yemen ==
- Aden
- Ahwar
- Al Qasha
- Baraqish
- Al Bayda', Yemen
- Beihan
- Ad Dali'
- Dhamar, Yemen
- Furah
- Al Ghaydah
- Hadiboh
- Hajjah
- Al Hudaydah
- Ibb
- Jibla
- Kawkaban
- Lahij
- Ma'rib
- Al Mahwit
- Makram
- Mokha
- Mukalla
- Mukayras
- Nishtun
- Qishn
- Saada
- As Salif
- Sanaa
- Sayfaf
- Seiyun
- Shibam
- Ash Shihr
- Shuqrah
- Steroh
- Taiz
- Tarim, Yemen
- Thamud, Yemen
- Yarim
- Zabid
- Zinjibar

== Communications in Yemen ==
- Communications in Yemen
- Internet usage in Yemen
- Postage stamps and postal history of Aden
- .ye

== Yemeni culture ==
=== Yemeni architecture ===
- Architecture of Yemen

==== Buildings and structures in Yemen ====
===== Dams in Yemen =====
- Marib Dam

=== Yemeni cuisine ===
- Yemeni cuisine
- Jachnun
- Lahoh
- Malooga
- Mandi (food)
- Saltah
- Shafoot
- Fatoot
- Fahsa
- Zhug
- Murtabak

=== Languages of Yemen ===
- Hadhrami Arabic
- San'ani Arabic
- Taʽizzi-Adeni Arabic
- Yemenite Hebrew language
- Mehri language
- Sanaani Hebrew language
- Soqotri language
- Hobyót language

=== Literature of Yemen ===
- Lost in a Fairy Tale

=== Yemeni music ===
- Music of Yemen
- National anthem of Yemen

== Economy of Yemen ==
- Economy of Yemen
- Water supply and sanitation in Yemen
- Yemeni buqsha
- Yemeni rial
- Yemenia

=== Trade unions of Yemen ===
- Yemeni Confederation of Labor Unions

== Education in Yemen ==
- Sheikh Abdul Majeed al-Zindani

=== Schools in Yemen ===
- Sanaa International School

=== Universities and colleges in Yemen ===
- University of Aden
- Lebanese International University

=== Yemeni Organizations Outside Yemen ===
- AAYSP

== Environment of Yemen ==
=== Conservation in Yemen ===
==== World Heritage Sites in Yemen ====
- Sanaa
- Shibam
- Zabid

== Geography of Yemen ==
- Geography of Yemen
- Bab-el-Mandeb
- Gulf of Aden
- Hadhramaut
- ISO 3166-2:YE
- Lower Yemen
- Bab Iskender
- Ras Menheli
- Saudi-Yemen barrier
- Tihamah
- Upper Yemen

=== Islands of Yemen ===
- Hanish Islands
- Kamaran
- Perim
- Socotra

=== Mountains of Yemen ===
- Jabal An-Nabi Shu'ayb

=== Volcanoes of Yemen ===
- Jabal al-Tair

=== Yemen geography stubs ===
- 'Adan Governorate
- 'Amran Governorate
- Abyan Governorate
- Ad Dali'
- Ad Dali' Governorate
- Aden (colony)
- Ahwar
- Al Batinah, Yemen
- Al Bayda' Governorate
- Al Bayda', Yemen
- Al Ghaydah
- Al Hudaydah
- Al Hudaydah Governorate
- Al Jawf Governorate
- Al Mahrah Governorate
- Al Mahwit
- Al Mahwit Governorate
- Al Marqab, Yemen
- Mukalla
- Al Qasha
- Alawi (sheikhdom)
- Aqrabi
- As Salif
- Ash Shihr
- Audhali
- Bab Iskender
- Baraqish
- Cheikh Saïd
- Dathina
- Dhamar, Yemen
- Emirate of Beihan
- Emirate of Dhala
- Fadhli Sultanate
- Federation of Arab Emirates of the South
- Furah
- Gulf of Aden
- Hadhramaut Governorate
- Hadiboh
- Hajjah
- Hajjah Governorate
- Hanish Islands
- Haushabi Sultanate
- Havilah
- Himyar
- Ibb
- Jibla
- Kamaran
- Kathiri
- Kawkaban
- Lahej Sultanate
- Lahij
- Lahij Governorate
- Lower Aulaqi
- Lower Yafa
- Lower Yemen
- Ma'rib
- Ma'rib Governorate
- Maflahi
- Mahra Sultanate
- Makram
- Mukayras
- Nishtun
- Protectorate of South Arabia
- Qishn
- Qu'aiti
- Radfan
- Ras Menheli
- Raymah Governorate
- Saada
- Saada Governorate
- Sanaa Governorate
- Sayfaf
- Seiyun
- Shabwah Governorate
- Shaib
- Shibam
- Shuqrah
- Steroh
- Subeihi Sultanate
- Taiz
- Tarim, Yemen
- Template:Yemen-geo-stub
- Thamud, Yemen
- Tihamah
- Timna
- United Arab States
- Upper Aulaqi Sheikhdom
- Upper Aulaqi Sultanate
- Upper Yafa
- Upper Yemen
- Wahidi Balhaf
- Wahidi Bir Ali
- Wahidi Haban
- Yarim
- Zabid
- Zafar
- Zinjibar
- Zuqar Island

== Yemeni society ==
- Demographics of Yemen
- Yemen Scouts and Guides Association
- Chaush – Yemeni community in Hyderabad
- Mahris – Arab ethnographic group in Yemen

=== Arab Tribes of Yemen ===
- Qahtanite
- Kindah
- Ba'Alawi
- Banu Tamim

== Government of Yemen ==
- Assembly of Representatives of Yemen
- Foreign relations of Yemen
- Human rights in Yemen
- President of People's Democratic Republic of Yemen
- President of Yemen Arab Republic
- List of presidents of Yemen
- Prime Minister of South Yemen
- Prime Minister of Yemen
- Prime Minister of Yemen Arab Republic
- Wahiba Fara’a
- Deputy Prime Minister for Economic Affairs of Yemen

== Governorates of Yemen ==
- Governorates of Yemen
- Abyan Governorate
- Ad Dali' Governorate
- 'Adan Governorate
- Al Bayda' Governorate
- Al Hudaydah Governorate
- Al Jawf Governorate
- Al Mahrah Governorate
- Al Mahwit Governorate
- 'Amran Governorate
- Dhamar Governorate
- Hadhramaut Governorate
- Hajjah Governorate
- Ibb Governorate
- Lahij Governorate
- Ma'rib Governorate
- Raymah Governorate
- Saada Governorate
- Sanaa
- Sanaa Governorate
- Shabwah Governorate
- Taiz Governorate
- Template:Governorates of Yemen

== History of Yemen ==
- History of Yemen
- Aden (colony)
- Aden Protectorate
- Adnan
- Al-Hurra Al-Malika
- Alawi (sheikhdom)
- Ancient history of Yemen
- Aqrabi
- Audhali
- Cheikh Saïd
- Corrective revolution
- Dathina
- Democratic Republic of Yemen
- Dhu Nuwas
- Emblem of Yemen
- Emirate of Beihan
- Emirate of Dhala
- Fadhli Sultanate
- Federation of Arab Emirates of the South
- Federation of South Arabia
- Flag of Yemen
- Greater Yemen
- Hadhramaut
- Haushabi Sultanate
- Himyar
- Imams of Yemen
- Islamic history of Yemen
- Kathiri
- Kingdom of Awsan
- Lahej Sultanate
- List of rulers of Saba and Himyar
- Lower Aulaqi
- Lower Yafa
- Maflahi
- Mahra Sultanate
- Marib Dam
- Maritime Jewel
- Minaeans
- Modern history of Yemen
- Mutawakkilite Kingdom of Yemen
- North Yemen Civil War
- People's Democratic Republic of Yemen
- Postage stamps and postal history of Aden
- President of People's Democratic Republic of Yemen
- President of Yemen Arab Republic
- List of Presidents of Yemen
- Prime Minister of South Yemen
- Prime Minister of Yemen
- Prime Minister of Yemen Arab Republic
- Protectorate of South Arabia
- Qahtanite
- Qu'aiti
- Qutaibi
- Radfan
- Sabaean language
- Sabaeans
- Sanaa massacre
- September 15th, 2006 Yemen attacks
- Shaib
- South Arabian alphabet
- South Yemen
- South Yemeni dinar
- Subeihi Sultanate
- Terrorism in Yemen
- Timeline of Yemeni history
- Treaty of Jeddah (2000)
- USS Cole bombing
- United Nations Yemen Observation Mission
- Upper Aulaqi Sheikhdom
- Upper Aulaqi Sultanate
- Upper Yafa
- Wahidi Balhaf
- Wahidi Bir Ali
- Wahidi Haban
- Yemen Arab Republic
- Yemeni buqsha
- Yemeni unification
- Ziyadid dynasty

=== Archaeological sites in Yemen ===
- Ma'rib
- Marib Dam
- Timna

=== Elections in Yemen ===
- Elections in Yemen
- Yemeni presidential election, 2006

=== School massacres in Yemen ===
- Sanaa massacre

=== Terrorism in Yemen ===
- September 15, 2006 Yemen attacks
- 2010 cargo plane bomb plot

=== Wars involving Yemen ===
- Saudi–Yemeni war
- 1948 Arab–Israeli War
- North Yemen Civil War
- Hanish Islands conflict

=== Years in Yemen ===
==== 2006 in Yemen ====
- Yemen at the 2006 Asian Games
- Yemeni presidential election, 2006

== Yemeni media ==
=== Newspapers published in Yemen ===
- Al-Ayyam (Yemen)
- Shabab Yemeni
- Yemen Observer
- Yemen Times

== Military of Yemen ==
- Yemen Air Force
- Yemeni Armed Forces

== Organizations based in Yemen ==
- Dhofar Liberation Front

== Yemeni people ==
- List of Yemenis
- Allal Ab Aljallil Abd Al Rahman Abd
- Abd al-Aziz ibn Musa
- Abdel Ghalib Ahmad Hakim
- Abdul Aziz bin Hars bin Asad Yemeni Tamimi
- Abdul Rahman Mohamed Saleh Naser
- Abu Al Fazal Abdul Wahid Yemeni Tamimi
- Abu Bakr Ibn Ali Muhhammad Alahdal
- Ahmed Umar Abdullah al Hikimi
- Faruq Ali Ahmed
- Fayad Yahya Ahmed
- Muhammad Ahmad Abdallah Al Ansi
- Mohammed Ahmed Ali Al Asadi
- Saad Masir Mukbl Al Azani
- Ali Hamza Ahmed Sulayman al Bahlul
- Ghaleb Nassar Al Bihani
- Adil Said Al Haj Obeid Al Busayss
- Atag Ali Abdoh Al-Haj
- Al Hamdani
- Abdul Al Salam Al Hilal
- Al Khadr Abdallah Muhammed Al Yafi
- Mahmoud Abd Al Aziz Abd Al Mujahid
- Ali Yahya Mahdi Al Raimi
- Mashur Abdallah Muqbil Ahmed Al Sabri
- Hani Abdul Muslih al Shulan
- Abdul Aziz Abdullah Ali Al Suadi
- Muktar Yahya Najee Al Warafi
- Abdullah Al-Baradouni
- Muhammed al-Darbi
- Muhammad al-Gharsi
- Omar Ahmad Omar al-Hubishi
- Al-Khayzuran
- Issam Ahmad Dibwan al-Makhlafi
- Samir Abduh Sa'id al-Maktawi
- Bashir Nashir Al-Marwalah
- Bassam Abdullah bin Bushar al-Nahdi
- Mohammad Ahman al-Naziri
- Fahd al-Quso
- Fawaz al-Rabeiee
- Abd Al-Rahman Ali Al-Jifri
- Abdullah Al-Rimi
- Shuhour Abdullah Mukbil al-Sabri
- Bashir Ali Nasser al-Sharari
- Alyan Muhammad Ali al-Wa'eli
- Ammar Abadah Nasser al-Wa'eli
- Amin Saad Muhammad al-Zumari
- Ahmad al-Akhader Nasser Albidani
- Naji Al Ashwal
- Ayoub Murshid Ali Saleh
- Azd
- Banu Lakhm
- Jalal Salam Bin Amer
- Hassan Mohammed Ali Bin Attash
- Ramzi bin al-Shibh
- Ghassanids
- Fahed Abdullah Ahmad Ghazi
- Salem Ahmed Hadi
- Salim Ahmed Hamdan
- Hamdani
- Harbi al-Himyari
- Abu Ali al-Harithi
- Hashid
- Emad Abdalla Hassan
- Fadil Husayn Salih Hintif
- Bader Ben Hirsi
- Ibrahim Othman Ibrahim Idris
- Idris Ahmed Abdu Qader Idris
- Sadeq Muhammad Sa'id Ismail
- Khalid Mohammed Salih Al Dhuby
- Karama Khamis
- Karam Khamis Sayd Khamsan
- Rizwan Khan
- Lakhmids
- Mahmoud Omar Mohammed Bin Atef
- Jamal Muhammad Alawi Mar'i
- Muaz Hamza Ahmad Al Alawi
- Muhhammad Said Bin Salem
- Musa bin Nusair
- Sa id Salih Sa id Nashir
- Nethanel ben Isaiah
- Abdulaziz Muhammad Saleh bin Otash
- Qahtanite
- Khaled Qasim
- Rabiah ibn Mudhar
- Sabaeans
- Said Muhammed Salih Hatim
- Sharifa Fatima
- Shawki Awad Balzuhair
- Sheikh Abdul Majeed al-Zindani
- Riyadh Shikawi
- Abdul Rahman Abdul Abu Ghiyth Sulayman
- Tarek Ali Abdullah Ahmed Baada
- Ayoob Tarish
- Toufiq Saber Muhammad Al Marwa’i
- Waddah al-Yaman
- Haitham al-Yemeni
- Zahar Omar Hamis Bin Hamdoun
- Walid Said Bin Said Zaid

=== Yemeni extrajudicial prisoners of the United States ===
- Abdul Aziz Abdullah Ali Al Suadi
- Abu Bakr Ibn Ali Muhhammad Alahdal
- Ahmed Umar Abdullah al Hikimi
- Ali Abdullah Ahmed
- Fahmi Abdullah Ahmed
- Faruq Ali Ahmed
- Fayad Yahya Ahmed
- Muhammad Ahmad Abdallah Al Ansi
- Mohammed Ahmed Ali Al Asadi
- Saad Masir Mukbl Al Azani
- Ghaleb Nassar Al Bihani
- Mohammed Ahmad Said Al Edah
- Atag Ali Abdoh Al-Haj
- Mohammed Abdullah Al Hamiri
- Mohammad Ahmed Abdullah Saleh Al Hanashi
- Abdul Al Salam Al Hilal
- Issam Hamid Al Bin Ali Al Jayfi
- Asim Thahit Abdullah Al Khalaqi
- Ha Il Aziz Ahmed Al Maythali
- Musab Omar Ali Al Mudwani
- Mahmoud Abd Al Aziz Abd Al Mujahid
- Nasir Najr Nasir Balud Al Mutayri
- Sulaiman Awath Sulaiman Bin Ageel Al Nahdi
- Khalid Abd Jal Jabbar Muhammad Juthman Al Qadasi
- Sabri Mohammed Ebrahim Al Qurashi
- Abdul Rahman Umir Al Qyati
- Riyad Atiq Ali Abdu Al Haj Al Radai
- Ali Ahmad Muhammad Al Rahizi
- Ali Yahya Mahdi Al Raimi
- Mashur Abdallah Muqbil Ahmed Al Sabri
- Abdul Al Saleh
- Fahmi Salem Said Al Sani
- Mustafa Abdul Qawi Abdul Aziz Al Shamyri
- Hani Abdul Muslih al Shulan
- Ali Husayn Abdullah Al Tays
- Hamoud Abdullah Hamoud Hassan Al Wady
- Abd al Malik Abd al Wahab
- Muktar Yahya Najee Al Warafi
- Mohammed Ali Salem Al Zarnuki
- Saleh Mohamed Al Zuba
- Muhammed al-Darbi
- Sanad Ali Yislam Al-Kazimi
- Abdulah Alhamiri
- Ayoub Murshid Ali Saleh
- Yasim Muhammed Basardah
- Jalal Salam Bin Amer
- Hassan Mohammed Ali Bin Attash
- Mohammed Ali Abdullah Bwazir
- Fahed Abdullah Ahmad Ghazi
- Salem Ahmed Hadi
- Mohammed Ahmed Said Haidel
- Abdel Ghalib Ahmad Hakim
- Salim Ahmed Hamdan
- Mohammed Mohammed Hassen
- Said Muhammed Salih Hatim
- Fadil Husayn Salih Hintif
- Ibrahim Othman Ibrahim Idris
- Idris Ahmed Abdu Qader Idris
- Sadeq Muhammad Sa'id Ismail
- Yasin Qasem Muhammad Ismail
- Khalid Mohammed Salih Al Dhuby
- Karam Khamis Sayd Khamsan
- Mohammed Nasir Yahya Khusruf
- Ahmed Yaslam Said Kuman
- Fawaz Naman Hamoud Abdallah Mahdi
- Mahmoud Omar Mohammed Bin Atef
- Jamal Muhammad Alawi Mar'i
- Sharaf Ahmad Muhammad Masud
- Hussein Salem Mohammed
- Samir Naji Al Hasan Moqbel
- Muhsin Muhammad Musheen Moqbill
- Muaz Hamza Ahmad Al Alawi
- Muhhammad Said Bin Salem
- Abdul Rahman Mohamed Saleh Naser
- Sa id Salih Sa id Nashir
- Ahmed Abdul Qader
- Khaled Qasim
- Salman Yahya Hassan Mohammed Rabeii
- Mohammed Ahmed Salam
- Shawki Awad Balzuhair
- Abdul Rahman Abdul Abu Ghiyth Sulayman
- Mohmmad Ahmad Ali Tahar
- Tarek Ali Abdullah Ahmed Baada
- Toufiq Saber Muhammad Al Marwa’i
- Uthman Abdul Rahim Mohammed Uthman
- Zahar Omar Hamis Bin Hamdoun
- Walid Said Bin Said Zaid
- Mohammed H. Al-Shatri

=== Yemenite Jews ===
- Yemenite Jews
- Yemenite Hebrew language
- Zohar Argov
- Daklon
- Shoshana Damari
- Dhu Nuwas
- Dor Daim
- Zion Golan
- Ofra Haza
- Jacob ben Nathanael
- Kerem Hatemanim
- Kiryat Netafim
- Operation Magic Carpet (Yemen)
- Sanaani Hebrew language
- Shalom Shabazi
- Shalom Sharabi
- Amnon Yitzhak
- Yosef Qafih

=== Yemeni politicians ===
- Hamid al-Ahmar
- Abdulkarim Al-Arhabi
- Mohsin Ahmad al-Aini
- Muhammad Said al-Attar
- Abdul Karim al-Iryani
- Hassan al-Amri
- Haidar Abu Bakr al-Attas
- Ali Salem al-Beidh
- Abdul Qadir Bajamal
- Faraj Said Bin Ghanem
- Ahmad bin Yahya
- Abdul Latif Dayfallah
- Dhu Nuwas
- Mahmoud al-Gayifi
- Abdul Aziz Abdul Ghani
- Kadhi Abdullah al-Hagri
- Muhammad Ali Haitham
- Abdul Rahman al-Iryani
- Abdullah Kurshumi
- Hassan Muhammad Makki
- Muhammad al-Badr
- Yasin Said Numan
- Ahmad Muhammad Numan
- Jarallah Omar
- List of Presidents of Yemen
- Prime Minister of South Yemen
- Prime Minister of Yemen
- Deputy Prime Minister of Yemen
- Prime Minister of Yemen Arab Republic
- AbdulWahab Raweh
- Abdul Salam Sabrah
- Ali Abdullah Saleh
- Abdullah as-Sallal
- Faysal al-Shaabi
- Faisal Bin Shamlan
- Sheikh Abdul Majeed al-Zindani
- Wahiba Fara’a
- Yahya Muhammad Hamid ed-Din

==== Assassinated Yemeni politicians ====
- Ahmad al-Ghashmi
- Kadhi Abdullah al-Hagri
- Yahya Muhammad Hamid ed-Din

==== Presidents of North Yemen ====
- President of Yemen Arab Republic
- Ahmad al-Ghashmi
- Ibrahim al-Hamadi
- Abdul Karim Abdullah al-Arashi
- Abdul Rahman al-Iryani
- Ali Abdullah Saleh
- Abdullah as-Sallal

==== Presidents of South Yemen ====
- President of People's Democratic Republic of Yemen
- Haidar Abu Bakr al-Attas
- Abdul Fattah Ismail
- Ali Nasir Muhammad
- Salim Ali Rubai
- Qahtan Mohammed al-Shaabi

=== Rulers of Yemen ===
- Arwa al-Sulayhi
- Ali Abdullah Saleh

=== Yemeni economists ===
- Abdulaziz Al-Saqqaf

=== Yemeni people stubs ===
- Template:Yemen-bio-stub
- Abd al-Aziz ibn Musa
- Abdul Aziz Abdul Ghani
- Abdul Karim Abdullah al-Arashi
- Abdul Karim al-Iryani
- Abdul Latif Dayfallah
- Abdul Qadir Bajamal
- Abdul Rahman al-Iryani
- Abdul Salam Sabrah
- AbdulWahab Raweh
- Abdulaziz Al-Saqqaf
- Abdullah Al-Baradouni
- Abdullah Kurshumi
- Abdullah as-Sallal
- Abu Ali al-Harithi
- Ageel bin Muhammad al-Badr
- Ahmad Muhammad Numan
- Ahmad al-Ghashmi
- Al-Khayzuran
- Ali Nasir Muhammad
- Ali Salem al-Beidh
- Amnon Yitzhak
- Ayoob Tarish
- Faraj Said Bin Ghanem
- Faysal al-Shaabi
- Haidar Abu Bakr al-Attas
- Haitham al-Yemeni
- Harbi al-Himyari
- Hassan Muhammad Makki
- Hassan al-Amri
- Ibrahim al-Hamadi
- Jacob ben Nathanael
- Kadhi Abdullah al-Hagri
- Karama Khamis
- Mahmoud al-Gayifi
- Mohammad Ahman al-Naziri
- Mohsin Ahmad al-Aini
- Muhammad Ali Haitham
- Muhammad Assad
- Muhammad Said al-Attar
- Muhammad al-Gharsi
- Naji Al Ashwal
- Qahtan Mohammed al-Shaabi
- Rabiah ibn Mudhar
- Rosa Mustafa Abdulkhaleq
- Said Muhammed Salih Hatim
- Salim Ali Rubai
- Samir Naji Al Hasan Moqbel
- Sharifa Fatima
- Sheikh Abdul Majeed al-Zindani
- Wahiba Fara’a
- Yasin Said Numan
- Abdullah Muhammad AlKathiri

== Politics of Yemen ==
- Politics of Yemen
- Assembly of Representatives of Yemen
- Dofar Liberation Front
- Emblem of Yemen
- Flag of Yemen
- Foreign relations of Yemen
- Human rights in Yemen
- National anthem of Yemen
- Steadfastness and Confrontation Front
- Wahiba Fara’a

=== Political parties in Yemen ===
- List of political parties in Yemen
- Arab Socialist Rebirth Party (Yemen)
- Baath Party
- General People's Congress
- Nasserite Unionist People's Organisation
- Yemeni Congregation for Reform
- Yemeni Socialist Party

== Religion in Yemen ==
- Islam in Yemen
- Roman Catholicism in Yemen

=== Zaydi ===
- Zaidiyyah

==== Zaydis ====
- Muhammad ash-Shawkani

== Science and Technology in Yemen ==
- Internet in Yemen

== Sport in Yemen ==
- Yemen at the 2006 Asian Games
- Yemen at the Commonwealth Games

=== Football in Yemen ===
- South Yemen national football team
- Yemen Football Association
- Yemen national football team

==== Yemeni football clubs ====
- Al Yarmuk Al Rawda
- Ahli Sanaa Club
- Al-Hilal (Al Hudaydah)
- Hassan (Yemen football club)
- Al-Saqr
- Al-Sha'ab Hadramaut
- Al-Tilal

==== Yemeni football competitions ====
- Yemeni League

==== Football venues in Yemen ====
- Ali Muhesen Stadium
- Althawra Sports City Stadium
- Baradem Mukalla Stadium
- May 22 Stadium

=== Yemen at the Olympics ===
- North Yemen at the 1984 Summer Olympics
- North Yemen at the 1988 Summer Olympics
- South Yemen at the 1988 Summer Olympics
- Yemen at the 1992 Summer Olympics
- Yemen at the 1996 Summer Olympics
- Yemen at the 2000 Summer Olympics
- Yemen at the 2004 Summer Olympics

== Transport and travel in Yemen ==
- Transport in Yemen
- Visa requirements for Yemeni citizens

=== Aviation in Yemen ===
- Rosa Mustafa Abdulkhaleq
- Yemen Air Force
- Yemenia

==== Airports in Yemen ====
- Al Ghaydah Airport
- Sanaa International Airport
- Taiz International Airport

== Yemen stubs ==
- Template:Yemen-stub
- .ye
- Aden-Abyan Islamic Army
- Al Yarmuk Al Rawda
- Ahli Sanaa Club
- Al-Hilal (Al Hudaydah)
- Al-Saqr
- Al-Sha'ab Hadramaut
- Al-Tilal
- Ali Muhesen Stadium
- Althawra Sports City Stadium
- Arab Socialist Rebirth Party (Yemen)
- Baradem Mukalla Stadium
- Democratic Republic of Yemen
- Emblem of Yemen
- Hassan (Yemen football club)
- List of newspapers in Yemen
- May 22 Stadium
- Mudhaffar
- Nasserite Unionist People's Organisation
- North Yemen at the 1984 Summer Olympics
- North Yemen at the 1988 Summer Olympics
- President of People's Democratic Republic of Yemen
- President of Yemen Arab Republic
- Prime Minister of South Yemen
- Prime Minister of Yemen
- Prime Minister of Yemen Arab Republic
- Qutaibi
- Roman Catholicism in Yemen
- Shabab Yemeni
- South Yemen at the 1988 Summer Olympics
- United Nations Yemen Observation Mission
- Yemen at the 1992 Summer Olympics
- Yemen at the 1996 Summer Olympics
- Yemen at the 2006 Asian Games
- Yemen at the Commonwealth Games
- Yemeni Confederation of Labor Unions
- Yemeni buqsha

== See also ==
- Lists of country-related topics - similar lists for other countries
