= Al Marqab =

Al Marqab may refer to:

- Al-Marqab University, in Libya
- Murqub, a district in northern Libya
- Al Marqab, Saudi Arabia, a village subsumed by Riyadh, now a neighborhood in southcentral Riyadh
- Al-Marqab Castle, a crusader castle between Tartous and Latakia in Syria
- Al Marqab, Yemen, a village in western Yemen
