= Salman Rabeii =

Salman Rabeii held in detainment camps in Cuba

Salman Yahya Hassan Muhammad Rabeii
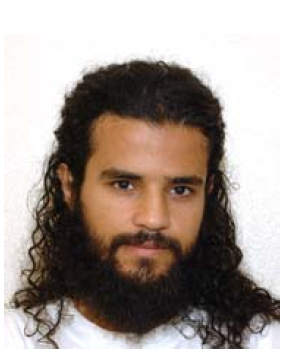
- Salman Yahya Hassan Muhammad Rabeii wearing the white uniform issued to compliant individuals
- Born: June 30, 1979 (age 47); Jeddah, Saudi Arabia
- Arrested: late 2001 official accounts differ official accounts differ
- Citizenship: Yemen
- Detained at: Guantanamo
- ISN: 508
- Charge: extrajudicial detention
- Status: Transferred to Oman

Salman Yahya Hassan Muhammad Rabeii (born June 30, 1979) is a citizen of Yemen, who was held in extrajudicial detention in the United States Guantanamo Bay detainment camps, in Cuba. His detainee ID number was 508.

Rabeii was cleared for release on December 1, 2016. He was transferred to Oman with nine other men, on January 16, 2017.

== Official status reviews ==
Originally the Bush Presidency asserted that captives apprehended in the "war on terror" were not covered by the Geneva Conventions, and could be held indefinitely, without charge, and without an open and transparent review of the justifications for their detention. In 2004, the United States Supreme Court ruled, in Rasul v. Bush, that Guantanamo captives were entitled to being informed of the allegations justifying their detention, and were entitled to try to refute them.

=== Office for the Administrative Review of Detained Enemy Combatants ===
Combatant Status Review Tribunals were held in a 3x5 meter trailer where the captive sat with his hands and feet shackled to a bolt in the floor.

Following the Supreme Court's ruling the Department of Defense set up the Office for the Administrative Review of Detained Enemy Combatants.

Scholars at the Brookings Institution, led by Benjamin Wittes, listed the captives still held in Guantanamo in December 2008, according to whether their detention was justified by certain common allegations:

- Salman Yahya Hassan Muhammad Rabeii was listed as one of the captives who "The military alleges ... took military or terrorist training in Afghanistan."
- Salman Yahya Hassan Muhammad Rabeii was listed as one of the captives who "The military alleges ... were at Tora Bora."
- Salman Yahya Hassan Muhammad Rabeii was listed as one of the captives whose "names or aliases were found on material seized in raids on Al Qaeda safehouses and facilities."
- Salman Yahya Hassan Muhammad Rabeii was listed as one of the captives who was a foreign fighter.

In the Combatant Status Review Tribunals, it is the Recorder's responsibility to act like a Prosecutor, and compile and distribute the allegations against the detainee. During Rabeii's hearing, the Tribunal members asked the recorder to explain why the wording of the allegations, as read out, differed from the wording in copies they had been given to read.

=== Formerly secret Joint Task Force Guantanamo assessment ===
On April 25, 2011, whistleblower organization WikiLeaks published formerly secret assessments drafted by Joint Task Force Guantanamo analysts. An 11-page Joint Task Force Guantanamo assessment was drafted on February 29, 2008. It was signed by camp commandant Rear Admiral Mark H. Buzby. He recommended continued detention.
