= Zahar Omar Hamis Bin Hamdoun =

Yemeni citizen detained in Guantanamo Bay detention camp

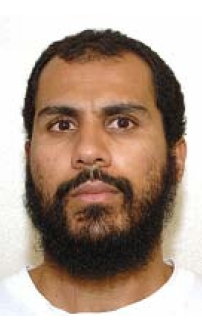
- Zahar Hamdoun's Guantanamo identity portrait, showing him wearing a white uniform, showing he was a "compliant individual
- Born: November 13, 1979 (age 47); Ash-Shihr, Yemen
- Arrested: 2002; Karachi, Pakistan; Pakistani security officials
- Citizenship: Yemen
- Detained at: Guantanamo
- ISN: 576
- Charge: No charge
- Status: Transferred to the United Arab Emirates

Zahar Omar Hamis Bin Hamdoun is a citizen of Yemen who was held in extrajudicial detention in the United States Guantanamo Bay detainment camps, in Cuba. His Guantanamo Internment Serial Number was 576. The Department of Defense reports that he was born on November 13, 1979, in Ash-Shihr, Yemen.

Zahir arrived at Guantanamo on May 5, 2002.

He had a Periodic Review Board hearing on December 8, 2015.

== Official status reviews ==
Originally the Bush Presidency asserted that captives apprehended in the "war on terror" were not covered by the Geneva Conventions, and could be held indefinitely, without charge, and without an open and transparent review of the justifications for their detention. In 2004, the United States Supreme Court ruled, in Rasul v. Bush, that Guantanamo captives were entitled to being informed of the allegations justifying their detention, and were entitled to try to refute them.

Combatant Status Review Tribunals were held in a 3x5 meter trailer where the captive sat with his hands and feet shackled to a bolt in the floor.

Following the Supreme Court's ruling the Department of Defense set up the Office for the Administrative Review of Detained Enemy Combatants.

=== OARDEC reviews ===
Scholars at the Brookings Institution, led by Benjamin Wittes, listed the captives still held in Guantanamo in December 2008, according to whether their detention was justified by certain common allegations:

- Zahar Omar Hamis Bin Hamdoun was listed as one of the captives whom the "military alleges ... are associated with Al Qaeda."
- Zahar Omar Hamis Bin Hamdoun was listed as one of the captives whom the "military alleges that the following detainees stayed in Al Qaeda, Taliban or other guest- or safehouses."
- Zahar Omar Hamis Bin Hamdoun was listed as one of the captives whom the "military alleges ... took military or terrorist training in Afghanistan."
- Zahar Omar Hamis Bin Hamdoun was listed as one of the captives whom the "military alleges that the following detainees were captured under circumstances that strongly suggest belligerency."
- Zahar Omar Hamis Bin Hamdoun was listed as one of the captives who was an "al Qaeda operative".
- Zahar Omar Hamis Bin Hamdoun was listed as one of the "82 detainees [who had] made no statement to CSRT or ARB tribunals or made statements that do not bear materially on the military’s allegations against them."

A Summary of Evidence memo was prepared for Zahar Omar Hamis Bin Hamdoun's Combatant Status Review Tribunal, on October 14, 2004.

A Summary of Evidence memo was prepared for Zahar Omar Hamis Bin Hamdoun's first annual Administrative Review Board, on July 12, 2005.

A Summary of Evidence memo was prepared for Za Her Omer Khamis's second annual Administrative Review Board, on August 20, 2006.

A four-page Summary of Evidence memo was prepared for Zahar Omar Hamis bin Hamdoun's third annual Administrative Review Board, on September 13, 2007.

=== Formerly secret Joint Task Force Guantanamo assessment ===
On April 25, 2011, whistleblower organization WikiLeaks published formerly secret assessments drafted by Joint Task Force Guantanamo analysts. A Joint Task Force Guantanamo assessment was drafted on March 27, 2008. It was signed by camp commandant Mark H. Buzby who recommended continued detention.

== Hunger strike ==
On February 11, 2009, US District Court judge Gladys Kessler declined to bar the use of restraint chairs for force-feeding Omar Khamis Bin Hamdoon and Mohammed Ali Abdullah Bawazir. Kessler's noted that Bawazir and Hamdoon petition stated that the use of the restraint chair was "tantamount to torture". However, she stated the opinion that because she lacked the medical expertise to evaluate the position of the camp's medical authorities she lacked jurisdiction to rule on the petition.

According to the Agence France Presse Bawazir and Hamdoon were not opposed to being force fed. According to the Agence France Presse camp authorities are withholding medical treatment for their other ailments from the hunger strikers, in an attempt to pressure them to quit their strike.
