= Batna =

Batna or BATNA may refer to:

- Batna (city), Algeria
- Batna Province, Algeria
- Best alternative to a negotiated agreement
- Mourad Batna, Moroccan football player

== See also ==
- Al Bāţinah (disambiguation)
