= Mohammed Ahmad Said Al Edah =

Yemeni citizen

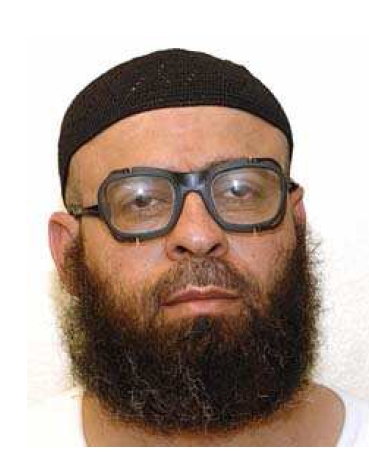
- Mohammed Ahmad Said Al Edah, wearing the white uniform issued to compliant individuals
- Born: 1962 (age 63–64); Hay al-Turbawi Ta'iz, Yemen
- Arrested: Pakistani border Pakistani border guard
- Released: 2016-08-15; United Arab Emirates
- Citizenship: Yemeni
- Detained at: Guantanamo
- Other name: Muhammad Ahmad Said al-Adahi
- ISN: 33
- Charge: No charge (extrajudicial detention)
- Status: transferred
- Occupation: Yemeni soldier (1982), worked at a Yemeni oil refinery

Mohammed Ahmad Said Al Edah is a citizen of Yemen who was held in the United States' Guantanamo Bay detainment camps, in Cuba, for fourteen and a half years. His Internment Serial Number is 33. Joint Task Force Guantanamo counter-terrorism analysts estimate he was born in 1962, in Hay al-Turbawi Ta'iz, Yemen.

He was transferred to United Arab Emirates, with fourteen other men, on August 15, 2016.

== Official status reviews ==
Originally the Bush presidency asserted that captives apprehended in the "war on terror" were not covered by the Geneva Conventions, and could be held indefinitely, without charge, and without an open and transparent review of the justifications for their detention. In 2004, the United States Supreme Court ruled, in Rasul v. Bush, that Guantanamo captives were entitled to being informed of the allegations justifying their detention, and were entitled to try to refute them.

=== Office for the Administrative Review of Detained Enemy Combatants ===
Combatant Status Review Tribunals were held in a 3x5 meter trailer where the captive sat with his hands and feet shackled to a bolt in the floor.

Following the Supreme Court's ruling the Department of Defense set up the Office for the Administrative Review of Detained Enemy Combatants.

Scholars at the Brookings Institution, led by Benjamin Wittes, listed the captives still held in Guantanamo in December 2008, according to whether their detention was justified by certain common allegations:

- Mohammed Ahmad Said Al Edah was listed as one of the captives who "The military alleges ... are associated with other groups hostile to coalition forces."
- Mohammed Ahmad Said Al Edah was listed as one of the captives who "The military alleges that the following detainees stayed in Al Qaeda, Taliban or other guest- or safehouses."
- Mohammed Ahmad Said Al Edah was listed as one of the captives who "The military alleges ... served on Osama Bin Laden’s security detail."
- Mohammed Ahmad Said Al Edah was listed as one of the captives who was an "al Qaeda operative".

Al Edah chose to participate in his Combatant Status Review Tribunal.

Al Edah attended his 2005 status review.

=== Mohammed Ahmad Said Al Edah v. George W. Bush ===
Twenty-nine pages from his Combatant Status Review Tribunal were made public, on July 13, 2005, when a writ of habeas corpus was filed on his behalf.

Carol Rosenberg, writing in the Miami Herald, reported that US District Court Judge Gladys Kessler ordered his release on August 17, 2009. Al Edah's habeas hearing lasted three days, much of it was held in camera, so Kessler could hear classified evidence. Rosenberg interviewed Kristin Wilhelm and Richard G. Murphy Jr., two of Al Adahi's defense attorneys. They said that Al Adahi had secured affidavits from other captives who had falsely denounced him.

Al Edah testified that his watch had a traditional analog face—with hands.

Revealed during the hearing was that Al Edah is suffering from heart disease, and that he had been offered heart surgery by camp medical officials.

In December 2009, Kessler cited the Department of Defense for contempt of court. She had ordered the Department of Defense to record his merits hearing, but this was not done. Officials asserted the lapse was "due to oversight and miscommunication." The Government is appealing Kessler's decision.

U.S. District Court Judge Gladys Kessler ordered his release in late August 2009. After an examination of the classified evidence she concluded "brief attendance at Al Farouq and eventual expulsion simply do not bring him within the ambit of the Executive's power to detain."

The Department of Justice initiated an appeal of Kessler's release order on September 22, 2009.

On July 13, 2010, the decision to release Mohammed Ahmad Said Al Edah was reversed on appeal.

=== Formerly secret Joint Task Force Guantanamo assessment ===
On April 25, 2011, whistleblower organization WikiLeaks published formerly secret assessments drafted by Joint Task Force Guantanamo analysts. His eleven-page Joint Task Force Guantanamo assessment was drafted on April 1, 2008. It was signed by camp commandant Rear Admiral Mark H. Buzby. He recommended continued detention.
