= Tarek Ali Abdullah Ahmed Baada =

Yemeni detainee (born 1978)

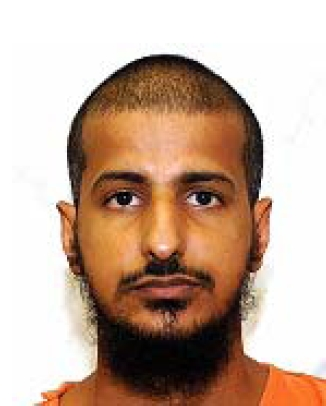
- Tariq Ali Abdallah Ahmad Ba’Awadha wearing the orange uniform issued to non-compliant individuals
- Born: 1978 (age 47–48); Shebwa, Yemen
- Detained at: Guantanamo
- ISN: 178
- Charge(s): no charge, held in extrajudicial detention
- Status: Transferred to Saudi Arabia

Tarek Ali Abdullah Ahmed Baada is a citizen of Yemen, who was formerly held in extrajudicial detention in the United States Guantanamo Bay detainment camps, in Cuba. His detainee ID number is 178. Joint Task Force Guantanamo counter-terrorism analysts estimated that Baada was born in 1978 in Shebwa, Yemen.

Baada arrived at Guantanamo on February 9, 2002, and was held at Guantanamo for fourteen years. Baada was cleared for release by the Guantanamo Joint Task Force initiated by President Barack Obama when he first took office in January 2009.

Baada has been a long term hunger striker, and, by June 2015, his weight had dropped to 75.4 pounds (34.2 kg) 56 percent of his ideal weight. In September 2015, his lawyer warned that Baada's life is in danger.

In September, an unspecific country offered to accept him into their country on the condition of being able to review his medical records. However, the Pentagon refused to release the records, citing privacy concerns.

== Inconsistent spelling and naming in various documents ==
Baada's name was spelled inconsistently on official Department of Defense documents:

- Tarek Ali Abdullah Ahmed Baada on the second official list, released on May 15, 2006.
- Tareq Ali Abdullah Ahmed Baada on the Summary of Evidence memo prepared for his Combatant Status Review Tribunal, on October 13, 2004, on the Summary of Evidence memos prepared for his first two annual Administrative Review Boards, on June 21, 2005, and March 3, 2006, and on four other official lists of captives.
- Tariq Ali Abdullah Ba Odah on a renewed habeas corpus petition filed on July 18, 2008.
- Tariq Ali Abdallah Ahmad Ba’Awadha on his JTF-GTMO detainee assessment.

== Official status reviews ==
Originally, the Bush presidency asserted that captives apprehended in the "war on terror" were not covered by the Geneva Conventions, and could be held indefinitely, without charge, and without an open and transparent review of the justifications for their detention. In 2004, the United States Supreme Court ruled, in Rasul v. Bush, that Guantanamo captives were entitled to being informed of the allegations justifying their detention, and were entitled to try to refute them.

=== Office for the Administrative Review of Detained Enemy Combatants ===
Combatant Status Review Tribunals were held in a 3x5 meter trailer where the captive sat with his hands and feet shackled to a bolt in the floor.

Following the Supreme Court's ruling the Department of Defense set up the Office for the Administrative Review of Detained Enemy Combatants.

Scholars at the Brookings Institution, led by Benjamin Wittes, listed the captives still held in Guantanamo in December 2008, according to whether their detention was justified by certain common allegations:

- Tareq Ali Abdullah Ahmed Baada was listed as one of the captives who "The military alleges ... traveled to Afghanistan for jihad."
- Tareq Ali Abdullah Ahmed Baada was listed as one of the captives who "The military alleges ... took military or terrorist training in Afghanistan."
- Tareq Ali Abdullah Ahmed Baada was listed as one of the captives who "The military alleges ... were at Tora Bora."
- Tareq Ali Abdullah Ahmed Baada was listed as one of the captives who was an "al Qaeda operative".
- Tareq Ali Abdullah Ahmed Baada was listed as one of the "82 detainees made no statement to CSRT or ARB tribunals or made statements that do not bear materially on the military’s allegations against them."

A Summary of Evidence memo was prepared for Tareq Ali Abdullah Ahmed Baada's Combatant Status Review Tribunal, on October 13, 2004. A Summary of Evidence memo was prepared for Tareq Ali Abdullah Ahmed Baada's first annual Administrative Review Board, on June 21, 2005. A Summary of Evidence memo was prepared for Tareq Ali Abdullah Ahmed Baada's second annual Administrative Review Board, on March 22, 2006.

=== Habeas corpus petition ===
A habeas corpus was filed on this captive's behalf. In September 2007, the Department of Justice published dossiers of unclassified documents arising from the Combatant Status Review Tribunals of 179 captives. This habeas was not among those published.

The Military Commissions Act of 2006 mandated that Guantanamo captives were no longer entitled to access the US civil justice system, so all outstanding habeas corpus petitions were stayed.

On June 12, 2008, the United States Supreme Court ruled, in Boumediene v. Bush, that the Military Commissions Act could not remove the right for Guantanamo captives to access the US Federal Court system. And all previous Guantanamo captives' habeas petitions were eligible to be re-instated. The judges considering the captives' habeas petitions would be considering whether the evidence used to compile the allegations the men and boys were enemy combatants justified a classification of "enemy combatant".

On July 16, 2008, Julia Symon filed a "UNOPPOSED MOTION FOR EXPEDITED ENTRY OF PROTECTIVE ORDER" on behalf of Mohammed Abdullah Mohammed Ba Odah, Tariq Ali Abdullah Ba Odah, Nasser Ali Abdullah Odah in Civil Action No. 06-cv-1668 (HHK). On June 26, 2015, Courthouse News reported that Baada's lawyer, Omar Farah, filed requests for his rapid transfer from Guantanamo because his weight had fallen dangerously low. His weight was so low his lawyers found him barely recognizable. Medical experts tell them his health is now so fragile that he could die from a simple infection. They said that, even if he escaped accidental death, death would be an inevitable consequence of weight so low.

His lawyers quoted policy on repatriating those with a "chronic disease", and argued he met the criteria for repatriation under this policy.

=== Formerly secret Joint Task Force Guantanamo assessment ===
On April 25, 2011, whistleblower organization WikiLeaks published formerly secret assessments drafted by Joint Task Force Guantanamo analysts. A Joint Task Force Guantanamo detainee assessment was drafted on January 13, 2008. It was ten pages long, and was signed by camp commandant Rear Admiral Mark H. Buzby. He recommended continued detention.

=== Guantanamo Review Task Force ===
On January 21, 2009, the day he was inaugurated, United States President Barack Obama issued three Executive orders related to the detention of individuals in Guantanamo. He established a task force to re-review the status of all the remaining captives. Where the OARDEC officials reviewing the status of the captives were all "field grade" officers in the US military (Commanders, naval Captains, Lieutenant Colonels and Colonels) the officials seconded to the task force were drawn from not only the Department of Defense, but also from five other agencies, including the Departments of State, Justice, Homeland Security. President Obama gave the task force a year, and it recommended the release of Baada and 54 other individuals.

== 2016-04-16 transfer ==
On Saturday April 16, 2016, Baada and eight other individuals from Yemen were transferred from Guantanamo to Saudi Arabia. The transfer came a week before President Obama was scheduled to visit Saudi Arabia.
