= Meade County High School =

Location
- 938 Old State Road; Brandenburg, Kentucky 40108; United States; 37.9945°N 86.1728°W

Information
- Former name: Brandenburg High School
- Type: Public high school
- Established: 1914
- School district: Meade County Schools
- NCES School ID: 210405001035
- Teaching staff: 68.85 (on an FTE basis)
- Grades: 9–12
- Enrollment: 1,468 (2023-2024)
- Student to teacher ratio: 21.32
- Colors: Green and white
- Mascot: Greenwaves
- Nickname: Male: Greenwaves; Female: Lady Waves
- Website: mchs.meade.kyschools.us

Meade County High School (formerly Brandenburg High School) is a public high school in Brandenburg, Kentucky, United States. It was established in 1914, and is part of the Meade County Schools district.

It serves the county, except for people living on Fort Knox; people living on Fort Knox are instead zoned to the Department of Defense Education Activity (DoDEA), which operates Fort Knox Middle High School.

The current campus, located on Old State Road, was built in 1962. As of 2026; it is going through major renovations and extensions, which is projected to be completed around the summer of 2028.

The former campus was on High Street near the baseball park. After the current campus was built, it was transformed into Central Elementary School, which shut down in the late 1990s. Shortly after, on September 3, 1999, the building burned down.

== Notable alumni ==
- Chip Jaenichen, former United States Maritime Administrator
- Rick Stansbury, college basketball coach
