= South Arabia =

Historical region in West Asia

South Arabia جنوب الجزيرة العربية
- Historical region of Arabia
- Map of South Arabia
- Country: Yemen; Saudi Arabia; Oman
- Largest city: Sanaa
- Demonym: South Arabians

South Arabia (Arabic: جنوب الجزيرة العربية, romanized: Janub al-Jazirat al-Arabia), or Greater Yemen, is a historical region that consists of the southern region of the Arabian Peninsula in the southern part of West Asia, mainly centered in what is now the Republic of Yemen, yet it historically included Najran, Jazan, and Asir, which are presently in Saudi Arabia, and Dhofar of present-day Oman.

South Arabia is inhabited by people possessing distinctive linguistic and ethnic affinities, as well as traditions and culture, transcending recent political boundaries. There are two indigenous language groups: the now extinct Old South Arabian languages and the unrelated Modern South Arabian languages, both members of the Semitic family.

== Etymology ==
The term Yamnat was mentioned in Old South Arabian inscriptions on the title of one of the kings of the second Himyarite Kingdom known as Shammar Yahri'sh. The term was probably referring to the southwestern coastline of the Arabian peninsula and the southern coastline between Aden and Hadramout. One etymology derives Yemen from ymnt, meaning "South", and significantly plays on the notion of the land to the right (𐩺𐩣𐩬). Other sources claim that Yemen is related to yamn or yumn, meaning "felicity" or "blessed", as much of the country is fertile. The Romans called it Arabia Felix (fertile Arabia), as opposed to Arabia Deserta (deserted Arabia). Classical Latin and Greek writers used the name "India" to refer to South Arabia (ancient Yemen). The use of the term "India" arose from the fact that the Persians called the Abyssinians whom they came into contact in South Arabia by the name of the Cushitic people who lived next to them, i.e., Indians. Southern Arabia was part of Indian Ocean trade routes for millennia. With the advent of the Omani Empire, ties were strengthened between India and the Eastern Coast of Africa and Madagascar.

== History ==
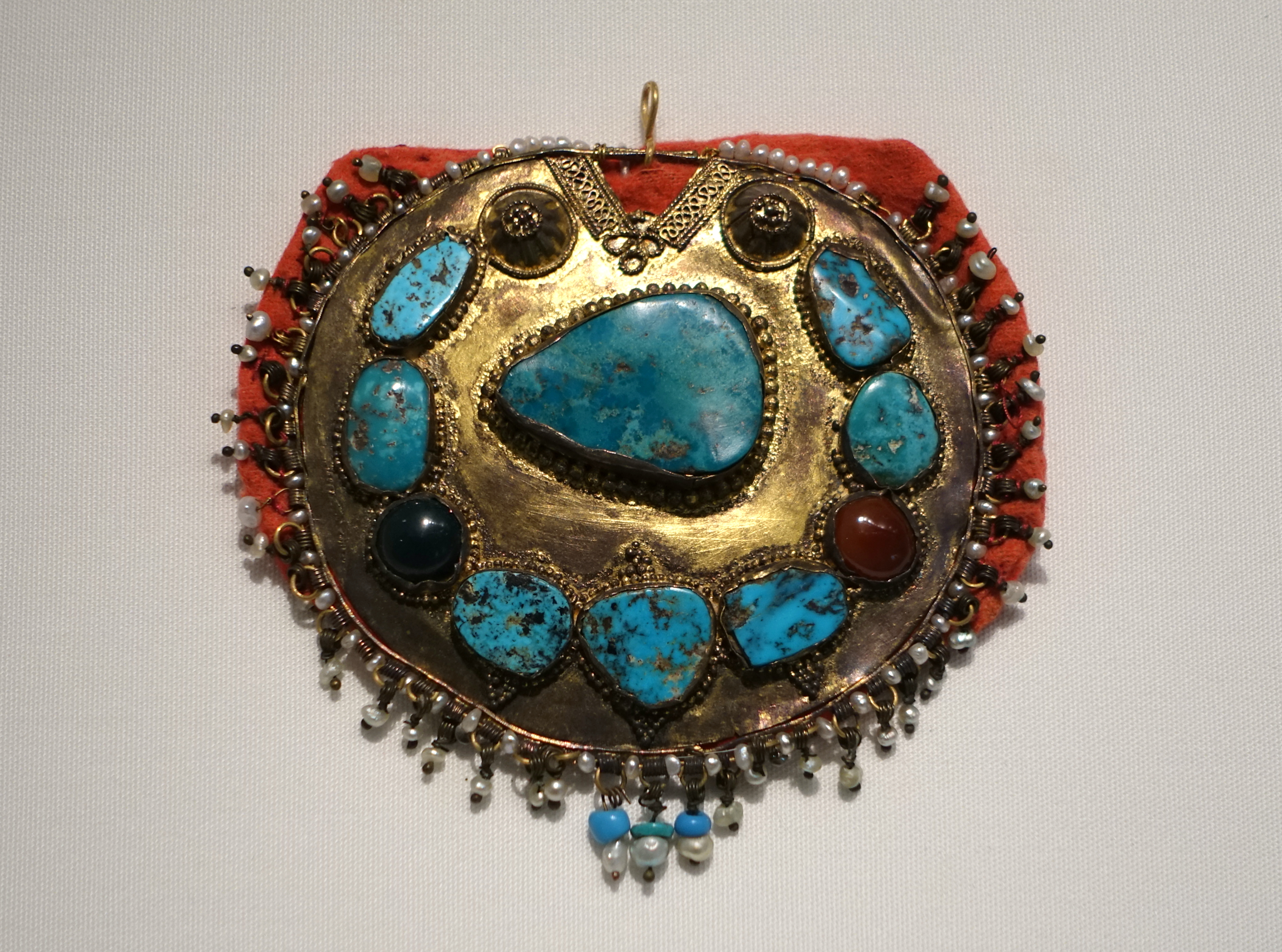
South Arabian forehead ornament, probably late 1800s, made of gold, pearls, turquoise, gemstones, exhibited in the Dallas Museum of Art (Dallas, Texas, US)

Three thousand years ago, several ancient states occupied the region of South Arabia, being M'ain, Qataban, Hadhramaut, and Saba. In these ancient times South Arabia claimed several notable features: the famous dam at Marib, the cosmopolitan incense trade, as well as the legendary Queen of Sheba. Two thousand years ago the Himyarites conquered South Arabia, dominating the region for several centuries. Then, they were defeated and displaced by the Persian armies of the Sasanian dynasty (575 CE), who also arrived by sea. A half-century later, the region was integrated into the First Islamic state (628 CE).

== See also ==
- List of Yemen-related topics
