= Samir Naji Al Hasan Moqbel =

Yemeni Guantanamo Bay detainee (born 1977)

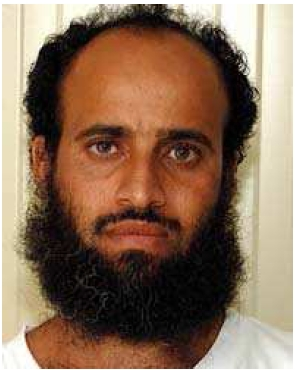
- Guantanamo mugshot
- Born: December 1, 1977 (age 48); Taiz, Yemen
- Arrested: late 2001; Pakistan
- Citizenship: Yemen
- Detained at: Guantanamo
- ISN: 43
- Charge(s): No charge, held in extrajudicial detention
- Status: Transferred to Oman in 2016

Samir Naji Al Hasan Moqbel is a citizen of Yemen who was held in extrajudicial detention in the United States's Guantanamo Bay detention camps, in Cuba. His Guantanamo Internee Security Number was 043. The Department of Defense reports Moqbel was born on December 1, 1977, in Taiz, Yemen.

On April 15, 2013, The New York Times published an Op-ed by Moqbel titled "Gitmo is killing me". In it he described that he would not eat "until they restore my dignity." He wrote that he had lost 30 pounds and described how it feels being force fed. "As it was thrust in, it made me feel like throwing up. I wanted to vomit, but I couldn't," Moqbel wrote. "There was agony in my chest, throat and stomach. I had never experienced such pain before. I would not wish this cruel punishment upon anyone." His Op-Ed stirred wide commentary.

In January 2016, Moqbel was among 10 Yemeni detainees that were transferred and resettled in Oman.

== Background ==
Moqbel arrived at Guantanamo on January 11, 2002, and was held at Guantanamo for 14 years.

In the Op-Ed Moqbel described traveling to Afghanistan to look for work, as he only earned $50 USD per month in Yemen. He said he was misled, could not find work in Afghanistan. He denied any association with terrorism.

Historian Andy Worthington noted that Moqbel mocked the extensive justifications offered for his detention, that he had been an Osama bin Laden bodyguard; that he had travelled all over Afghanistan – when he had only arrived in Afghanistan a month prior to his capture.

In his April 2013 Op-ed Moqbel described what it was like to be force-fed at Guantánamo Bay. Glen Greenwald, writing in The Guardian, praised the New York Times for publishing Moqbel's Op-Ed, which he described as one of the most powerful his readers would ever read.

== Official status reviews ==
Originally the Bush Presidency asserted that captives apprehended in the "war on terror" were not covered by the Geneva Conventions, and could be held indefinitely, without charge, and without an open and transparent review of the justifications for their detention. In 2004 the United States Supreme Court ruled, in Rasul v. Bush, that Guantanamo captives were entitled to being informed of the allegations justifying their detention, and were entitled to try to refute them.

=== Office for the Administrative Review of Detained Enemy Combatants ===
Following the Supreme Court's ruling the Department of Defense set up the Office for the Administrative Review of Detained Enemy Combatants. Memos containing the allegations that the DoD thought justified his detention were prepared for formal administrative hearings in 2004, 2005, 2006, 2007 and 2008. These memos were all published under the Freedom of Information Act. The DoD also published a seven-page transcript from Moqbel's 2004 hearing and a memo Moqbel prepared for his 2006 hearing.

Scholars at the Brookings Institution, led by Benjamin Wittes, listed the captives still held in Guantanamo in December 2008, according to whether their detention was justified by certain common allegations:

- Samir Naji Al Hasan Moqbel was listed as one of the captives who "The military alleges ... are associated with both Al Qaeda and the Taliban."
- Samir Naji Al Hasan Moqbel was listed as one of the captives who "The military alleges ... traveled to Afghanistan for jihad."
- Samir Naji Al Hasan Moqbel was listed as one of the captives who "The military alleges that the following detainees stayed in Al Qaeda, Taliban or other guest- or safehouses."
- Samir Naji Al Hasan Moqbel was listed as one of the captives who "The military alleges ... took military or terrorist training in Afghanistan."
- Samir Naji Al Hasan Moqbel was listed as one of the captives who "The military alleges ... fought for the Taliban."
- Samir Naji Al Hasan Moqbel was listed as one of the captives who "The military alleges ... were at Tora Bora."
- Samir Naji Al Hasan Moqbel was listed as one of the captives whose "names or aliases were found on material seized in raids on Al Qaeda safehouses and facilities."
- Samir Naji Al Hasan Moqbel was listed as one of the captives who "The military alleges ... served on Osama Bin Laden's security detail."
- Samir Naji Al Hasan Moqbel was listed as one of the captives who was an "al Qaeda operative".

=== Formerly secret Joint Task Force Guantanamo assessment ===
On April 25, 2011, whistleblower organization WikiLeaks published formerly secret assessments drafted by Joint Task Force Guantanamo analysts. The Telegraph published Moqbel's 10 page assessment, which had been drafted in April 2008. His assessment was signed by camp commandant Mark H. Buzby, and recommended Moqbel's continued detention.

The Telegraph quoted from his JTF-GTMO assessment, the claim that Moqbel had acknowledged participating in hostilities. JTF-GTMO assessed him as having served in the 55th Arab Brigade, as well as Osama bin Laden's bodyguard team. JTF-GTMO assessed him as having participated at the Battle of Tora Bora. JTF-GTMO called him as a member of the dirty thirty. They claimed he had trained at the Al Farouq training camp, and that he had staffed al Qaeda guesthouses. They claimed his name was found on a suspicious list. They claimed "he acknowledged he was recruited by known al-Qaida member, Marwan Jawan, who also facilitated his travel to Afghanistan."

=== Habeas corpus petition ===
A writ of habeas corpus was filed on Samir Naji Al Hasan Moqbel's behalf.

The Military Commissions Act of 2006 mandated that Guantanamo captives were no longer entitled to access the US civil justice system, so all outstanding habeas corpus petitions were stayed.

On June 12, 2008, the United States Supreme Court ruled, in Boumediene v. Bush, that the Military Commissions Act could not remove the right for Guantanamo captives to access the US Federal Court system. And all previous Guantanamo captives' habeas petitions were eligible to be re-instated. The judges considering the captives' habeas petitions would be considering whether the evidence used to compile the allegations the men and boys were enemy combatants justified a classification of "enemy combatant".

On July 15, 2008, Kristine A. Huskey filed a "NOTICE OF PETITIONERS' REQUEST FOR 30-DAYS NOTICE OF TRANSFER" on behalf of several dozen captives including Samir Naji Al Hasan Moqbel.

== Moqbel's letters published ==
Brazilian newspaper Folha de S.Paulo acquired copies of letters Moqbel had written to his lawyers. They quoted his confusion as to how he could have been cleared for release over five years ago, yet still remain in detention.
