= Ayoub Murshid Ali Saleh =

Yemeni detainee from Guantanamo Bay

Ayub Murshid Ali Salih
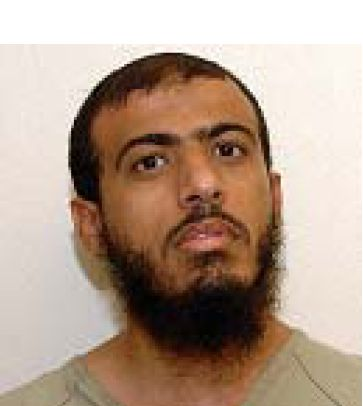
- Ayub Murshid Ali Salih wearing a white uniform issued to compliant individuals
- Born: April 29, 1978 (age 48); Dhamar, Yemen
- Arrested: 2002-09-11; Karachi, Pakistan; Pakistani security officials, CIA
- ISN: 836
- Charge: extrajudicial detention
- Status: Transferred to the United Arab Emirates on August 13, 2016.

Ayoub Murshid Ali Saleh is a citizen of Yemen who was held in extrajudicial detention in the United States Guantanamo Bay detainment camps, in Cuba. His Guantanamo Internment Serial Number was 836. The Department of Defense reports that he was born on April 29, 1978, in Dhamar, Yemen.

Ayoub Ali Saleh was apprehended by a combined force of Pakistani security officials and a CIA black site team, on 11 September 2002—the anniversary of al Qaeda's attack within the USA. He and five other individuals spent slightly more than a month in CIA custody at the salt pit, prior to being transferred to Guantanamo. Guantanamo analysts maintained the narrative that these six were an al Qaeda sleeper cell they called the "Karachi Six". However, that claim had been dropped by his 2016 Periodic Review Board hearing.

Saleh was transferred to the United Arab Emirates on August 13, 2016.

== Official status reviews ==
Originally the Bush Presidency asserted that captives apprehended in the "war on terror" were not covered by the Geneva Conventions, and could be held indefinitely, without charge, and without an open and transparent review of the justifications for their detention. In 2004, the United States Supreme Court ruled, in Rasul v. Bush, that Guantanamo captives were entitled to being informed of the allegations justifying their detention, and were entitled to try to refute them.

=== Office for the Administrative Review of Detained Enemy Combatants ===
Combatant Status Review Tribunals were held in a 3x5 meter trailer where the captive sat with his hands and feet shackled to a bolt in the floor.

Following the Supreme Court's ruling the Department of Defense set up the Office for the Administrative Review of Detained Enemy Combatants.

Scholars at the Brookings Institution, led by Benjamin Wittes, listed the captives still held in Guantanamo in December 2008, according to whether their detention was justified by certain common allegations:

- Bashir Nasir Ali Al Marwalah was listed as one of the captives who "The military alleges ... are Al Qaeda fighters."
- Bashir Nasir Ali Al Marwalah was listed as one of the captives who "The military alleges ... traveled to Afghanistan for jihad."
- Bashir Nasir Ali Al Marwalah was listed as one of the captives who "The military alleges that the following detainees stayed in Al Qaeda, Taliban or other guest- or safehouses."
- Bashir Nasir Ali Al Marwalah was listed as one of the captives who "The military alleges ... took military or terrorist training in Afghanistan."
- Bashir Nasir Ali Al Marwalah was listed as one of the captives who "The military alleges ... fought for the Taliban."
- Bashir Nasir Ali Al Marwalah was listed as one of the captives who "The military alleges that the following detainees were captured under circumstances that strongly suggest belligerency."
- Bashir Nasir Ali Al Marwalah was listed as one of the captives who was an "al Qaeda operative".
- Bashir Nasir Ali Al Marwalah was listed as one of "36 [captives who] openly admit either membership or significant association with Al Qaeda, the Taliban, or some other group the government considers militarily hostile to the United States."
- Bashir Nasir Ali Al Marwalah was listed as one of the captives who had admitted "fighting on behalf of Al Qaeda or the Taliban."
