= Idris Ahmad ʽAbd al Qadir Idris =

Yemeni Guantanamo Bay detainee

Idris Ahmed ʽAbd al Qader Idris
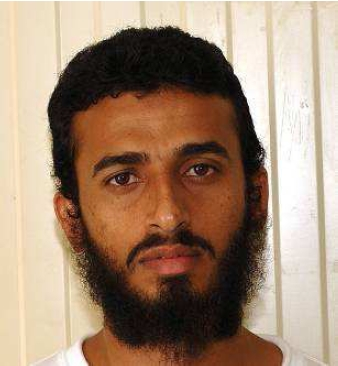
- Born: 1979 (age 46–47)
- Arrested: December 15, 2001; Afghanistan-Pakistan border Pakistani border officials
- Released: June 13, 2015
- Citizenship: Yemen
- Detained at: Guantanamo
- ISN: 35
- Charge: extrajudicial detention
- Status: transferred to Oman

Idris Ahmed ʽAbd al Qader Idris is a citizen of Yemen, who was held in the United States Guantanamo Bay detainment camps, in Cuba. His detainee ID number was 035. American intelligence analysts estimate he was born in 1979, in Rada, Yemen. Idris was transferred to Oman on June 13, 2015, where the Government of Oman agreed to what the Department of Defense called "appropriate security measures". He arrived on June 8, 2002, he was held in extrajudicial detention, and never faced criminal charges. The Department of Defense never fully released its justification for holding Idris, but on April 25, 2011, the Guantanamo Bay files leak was published.

== Background ==
According to Idris he graduated from high school in 1996, and then attended Sanaa University for two years. After he dropped out, he worked for Yemen's Ministry of Agriculture. Idris says an imam at the al-Khayr Mosque in Sanaa convinced him to travel to Afghanistan to teach the Quran in 1999. Idris says he did travel to Afghanistan, and spent eight months teaching the Quran at the al Raham Mosque in Kandahar but denied ever taking any military training or participating in hostilities. He described fleeing the American Bombardment of Afghanistan, traveling alone, to Khowst on November 15, 2001. He described spending approximately 20 days in Khowst, when an Arab named Rosi Khan, helped him join with a group of approximately 30 other arabs, who planned to travel together on foot to cross the border with Pakistan. These men were apprehended by Pakistani officials on December 15, 2001.

Idris was transferred to Guantanamo over six months later, on June 8, 2002.

American counter-terrorism analysts came to characterize the group of men Idris was captured with as "the dirty thirty", asserting that it was a group of Osama bin Laden bodyguards. Human rights workers and legal critics challenged this characterization, as it was based on denunciations from captives using unreliable coercive interrogation techniques. Information from the public record established that the men had little in common, prior to their capture, that they had come to Afghanistan at different times, and pursued different activities there, prior to their capture.

On September 21, the Department of Justice published a list of 55 captives who had been cleared for release or transfer from Guantanamo by the Guantanamo Review Task Force in 2010. On September 24, Fox News named Idris, as one of the men cleared for release—even though he had been described as one of Osama bin Laden's bodyguards.

== Official status reviews ==
Originally the Bush Presidency asserted that captives apprehended in the "war on terror" were not covered by the Geneva Conventions, and could be held indefinitely, without charge, and without an open and transparent review of the justifications for their detention. In 2004 the United States Supreme Court ruled, in Rasul v. Bush, that Guantanamo captives were entitled to being informed of the allegations justifying their detention, and were entitled to try to refute them.

=== Office for the Administrative Review of Detained Enemy Combatants ===
Combatant Status Review Tribunals were held in a 3x5 trailer where the captive sat with his hands and feet shackled to a bolt in the floor.

Following the Supreme Court's ruling the Department of Defense set up the Office for the Administrative Review of Detained Enemy Combatants.

Scholars at the Brookings Institution, led by Benjamin Wittes, listed the captives still held in Guantanamo in December 2008, according to whether their detention was justified by certain common allegations:

- Idris Ahmed Abdu Qader Idris was listed as one of the captives who "The military alleges ... are associated with both Al Qaeda and the Taliban."
- Idris Ahmed Abdu Qader Idris was listed as one of the captives who "The military alleges ... traveled to Afghanistan for jihad."
- Idris Ahmed Abdu Qader Idris was listed as one of the captives who was a foreign fighter.
- Idris Ahmed Abdu Qader Idris was listed as one of the "82 detainees made no statement to CSRT or ARB tribunals or made statements that do not bear materially on the military’s allegations against them."

=== Formerly secret Joint Task Force Guantanamo assessment ===
On April 25, 2011, whistleblower organization WikiLeaks published formerly secret assessments drafted by Joint Task Force Guantanamo analysts. An assessment dated January 26, 2008, was published, recommending his continued detention in Guantanamo. It was ten pages long, and was signed by Mark Buzby, the camp commandant.

=== Guantanamo Joint Review Task Force ===
When President Barack Obama took office he instituted a new review procedure the Guantanamo Joint Review Task Force, which was to report back to him, within a year, after conducting new assessments of the captives' status. The review classified the captives into three groups, those who should face charges, those who could safely be released or transferred to other countries, and a third group, too innocent to face charges, but too dangerous for the US to release. Idris was classified as safe to release.

== Transfer to Oman ==
Idris was transferred to Oman on June 13, 2015, with five other Yemenis.
