= Shawki Awad Balzuhair =

Yemeni Guantanamo detainee

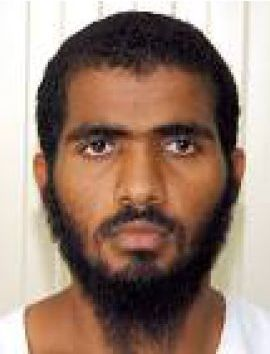
- Shawqi Awad Ba Zahir's identity portrait, showing him wearing the white uniform issued to compliant individuals
- Born: July 24, 1981 (age 45); Hadhramaut, Yemen
- Arrested: 2002-9-11; Karachi, Pakistan; Pakistani security officials
- Released: 2016-12-04; Cape Verde
- Citizenship: Yemen
- Detained at: CIA black sites, Guantanamo
- ISN: 838
- Charge: extrajudicial detention
- Status: A former "forever prisoner", transferred to Cape Verde on December 4, 2016

Shawki Awad Balzuhair (Arabic: شوقي عوض بالزهير; born July 24, 1981) is a citizen of Yemen, held in extrajudicial detention in the United States Guantanamo Bay detainment camps, in Cuba.

His detainee ID number was 838. The Department of Defense reports that Balzuhair was born on July 24, 1981, in Hadhramaut, Yemen.

Prior to his transfer to Guantanamo, Balzuhair spent a month in the CIA's archipelago of black sites, where torture was routinely practiced.

Initially the United States claimed Balzuhair and five other men seized in Karachi formed an underground al-Qaeda cell they called the "Karachi Six". Eventually analysts would acknowledge that this cell had never existed.

== Official status reviews ==
Originally the Bush Presidency asserted that captives apprehended in the "war on terror" were not covered by the Geneva Conventions, and could be held indefinitely, without charge, and without an open and transparent review of the justifications for their detention.

In 2004, the United States Supreme Court ruled, in Rasul v. Bush, that Guantanamo captives were entitled to being informed of the allegations justifying their detention, and were entitled to try to refute them.

=== Office for the Administrative Review of Detained Enemy Combatants ===
Combatant Status Review Tribunals were held in a 3x5 meter trailer where the captive sat with his hands and feet shackled to a bolt in the floor.

Following the Supreme Court's ruling the Department of Defense set up the Office for the Administrative Review of Detained Enemy Combatants.

Scholars at the Brookings Institution, led by Benjamin Wittes, listed the captives still held in Guantanamo in December 2008, according to whether their detention was justified by certain common allegations:

- Shawki Awad Balzuhair was listed as one of the captives who "The military alleges ... are associated with Al Qaeda."
- Shawki Awad Balzuhair was listed as one of the captives who "The military alleges ... traveled to Afghanistan for jihad."
- Shawki Awad Balzuhair was listed as one of the captives who "The military alleges that the following detainees stayed in Al Qaeda, Taliban or other guest- or safehouses."
- Shawki Awad Balzuhair was listed as one of the captives who "The military alleges ... took military or terrorist training in Afghanistan."
- Shawki Awad Balzuhair was listed as one of the captives who "The military alleges ... fought for the Taliban."
- Shawki Awad Balzuhair was listed as one of the captives who "The military alleges that the following detainees were captured under circumstances that strongly suggest belligerency."
- Shawki Awad Balzuhair was listed as one of the captives who was an "al Qaeda operative".
- Shawki Awad Balzuhair was listed as one of the "82 detainees made no statement to CSRT or ARB tribunals or made statements that do not bear materially on the military's allegations against them."

=== Formerly secret Joint Task Force Guantanamo assessment ===
On April 25, 2011, whistleblower organization WikiLeaks published formerly secret assessments drafted by Joint Task Force Guantanamo analysts. His 12-page Joint Task Force Guantanamo assessment was drafted on May 18, 2008. It was signed by camp commandant Rear Admiral David M. Thomas Jr. He recommended continued detention.

=== Joint Review Task Force ===
When he assumed office in January 2009 President Barack Obama made a number of promises about the future of Guantanamo. He promised the use of torture would cease at the camp. He promised to institute a new review system. That new review system was composed of officials from six departments, where the OARDEC reviews were conducted entirely by the Department of Defense. When it reported back, a year later, the Joint Review Task Force classified some individuals as too dangerous to be transferred from Guantanamo, even though there was no evidence to justify laying charges against them. On April 9, 2013, that document was made public after a Freedom of Information Act request. Carol Rosenberg, of the Miami Herald was to call Balzuhair and 78 other men "forever prisoners".

=== Periodic Review ===
In 2016, Bulzhair had his long delayed Period Review Board hearing. The officials who made recommendations following that review were told that the Karachi Six cell had never existed, after all.

== Transfer to Cape Verde ==
In 2009, following an attempted bombing by a Nigerian jihadist who had been trained and equipped in Yemen, the United States stopped repatriating Yemenis to Yemen. Bulzhair was transferred to Cape Verde on December 4, 2016.

According to Angela Viramontes, his lawyer, Bulzahair is a private person, who looks forward to anonymity upon his release. She said he wishes to get married, and raise a family, "He looks forward to having a wife, children, and a job, the experiences most young men hope for that Shawqi has yet to experience."
