= Ibrahim Othman Ibrahim Idris =

Sudanese Guantanamo detainee (1961–2021)

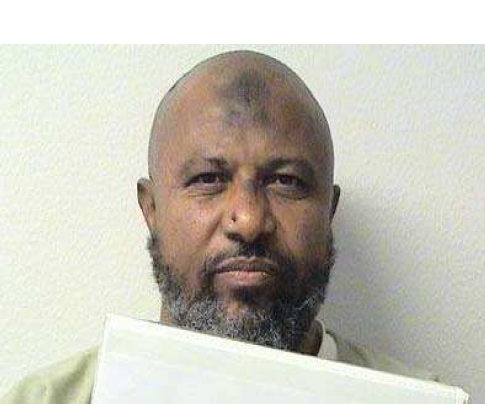
- Born: 1961; Port Sudan, Sudan
- Died: February 10, 2021 (aged 60); Port Sudan, Sudan
- Citizenship: Sudan
- Detained at: Guantanamo
- Other name: Mahmud Idris
- ISN: 36
- Charge(s): No charge, held in extrajudicial detention
- Occupation: Medical doctor

Ibrahim Othman Ibrahim Idris (1961 – February 10, 2021) was a citizen of Sudan, formerly held in extrajudicial detention in the United States' Guantanamo Bay detainment camps, in Cuba. His detainee ID number was 036.

In July 2013, a motion was filed seeking his release because his physical and emotional health had deteriorated to the point where he could not pose a threat. On October 3, 2013, Ben Fox, of the Associated Press, reported that the United States Department of Justice had dropped its opposition to Idris's repatriation.

His entry in the official list of Guantanamo captives asserts he was born in Hathramaut, Yemen, but his formerly secret Guantanamo assessment asserts he was born in Port Sudan, Sudan.

According to that Guantanamo assessment, he was a medical doctor and suspected of serving as a camp doctor for al-Qaeda on its front lines. A later review of Guantanamo assessments showed them to be unreliable, for example, containing allegations that were not supported by the underlying source document upon which they relied. (p. 9)

== Official status reviews ==
Originally, the Bush Presidency asserted that captives apprehended in the "war on terror" were not covered by the Geneva Conventions, and could be held indefinitely, without charge, and without an open and transparent review of the justifications for their detention. In 2004, the United States Supreme Court ruled, in Rasul v. Bush, that Guantanamo captives were entitled to being informed of the allegations justifying their detention, and were entitled to try to refute them.

=== Office for the Administrative Review of Detained Enemy Combatants ===
Following the Supreme Court's ruling, the Department of Defense set up the Office for the Administrative Review of Detained Enemy Combatants.

Scholars at the Brookings Institution, led by Benjamin Wittes, listed the captives still held in Guantanamo in December 2008, according to whether their detention was justified by certain common allegations:

- Ibrahim Othman Ibrahim Idris was listed as one of the captives who "The military alleges ... are associated with both Al Qaeda and the Taliban."
- Ibrahim Othman Ibrahim Idris was listed as one of the captives who "The military alleges that the following detainees stayed in Al Qaeda, Taliban or other guest- or safehouses."
- Ibrahim Othman Ibrahim Idris was listed as one of the captives who "The military alleges ... took military or terrorist training in Afghanistan."
- Ibrahim Othman Ibrahim Idris was listed as one of the captives who "The military alleges ... fought for the Taliban."
- Ibrahim Othman Ibrahim Idris was listed as one of the captives who "The military alleges ... were at Tora Bora."
- Ibrahim Othman Ibrahim Idris was listed as one of the captives whose "names or aliases were found on material seized in raids on Al Qaeda safehouses and facilities."
- Ibrahim Othman Ibrahim Idris was listed as one of the captives who "The military alleges that the following detainees were captured under circumstances that strongly suggest belligerency."
- Ibrahim Othman Ibrahim Idris was listed as one of the captives who was an "al Qaeda operative".
- Ibrahim Othman Ibrahim Idris was listed as one of the "82 detainees made no statement to CSRT or ARB tribunals or made statements that do not bear materially on the military's allegations against them."

=== Mahmud Idris v. George W. Bush ===
Combatant Status Review Tribunal panel 13 convened on November 3, 2004, to confirm Mahmud Idris's "enemy combatant" status. A 17-page dossier of unclassified documents prepared for that tribunal was assembled for his habeas corpus attorneys.

His habeas petition was first filed before US District Court Judge James Robertson. In September 2007, the Department of Justice published dossiers of unclassified documents arising from the Combatant Status Review Tribunals of 179 captives, including Idris's.

On August 15, 2006, his case was amalgamated with al Qosi v. Bush, along with 130 others.

The Military Commissions Act of 2006 mandated that Guantanamo captives were no longer entitled to access the US civil justice system, so all outstanding habeas corpus petitions were stayed.

In Salim Muhood Adem v. George W. Bush Civil Action No. 05-CV-00723 several dozen Guantanamo captives petitioned for relief because the Bush Presidency was not allowing the attorneys chosen by their families to meet with them. The Department of Justice was claiming the attorneys were not providing evidence that the captives had authorized them to act as their attorneys. US District Court Judge Alan Kay ruled a previous judicial ruling had not required that attorneys prove they had been authorized prior to visiting with a captive. The previous ruling had merely required that the captive explicitly authorize the attorney within ten days of that first visit. Kay declined to rule that the Bush administration was in contempt.

On June 12, 2008, the United States Supreme Court ruled, in Boumediene v. Bush, that the Military Commissions Act could not remove the right for Guantanamo captives to access the US Federal Court system. And all previous Guantanamo captives' habeas petitions were eligible to be re-instated.

On July 18, 2008, Jennifer R. Cowan of DEBEVOISE & PLIMPTON LLP re-initiated Civil Action No. 05-CV-1555 on behalf of Ibrahim Osman Ibrahim Idris.

On June 28, 2013, Cowan filed a motion which Carol Rosenberg, of the Miami Herald described as "a novel twist" in habeas petitions, in that it ignored assertions of the threat Idris posed, prior to his capture. The motion argues "he's too fat, too crazy and too physically sick to be a danger in the future. So Lamberth should send him home." Rosenberg notes the motion cites "Army regulations that recommend repatriation of POWs who are so sick they can't recover", and that the "Geneva Conventions require a war prisoner be sent home if his mental or physical fitness 'have been gravely diminished.'"

=== Formerly secret Joint Task Force Guantanamo assessment ===
On April 25, 2011, whistleblower organization WikiLeaks published formerly secret assessments drafted by Joint Task Force Guantanamo analysts. A ten-page assessment was drafted at Joint Task Force Guantanamo on April 15, 2008. That assessment was signed by camp commandant Mark Buzby and recommended his continued detention in Guantanamo. He was described as a "low threat" prisoner, which Carol Rosenberg, of the Miami Herald, explained meant he was compliant, and didn't represent a threat to JTF-GTMO staff. She reported the assessment "advised against his release, in part, because he 'resisted cooperation with interrogators and remains largely unexploited' — meaning he had yet to spill any al-Qaida secrets." She noted that the report described his health as "fair", completely skipping over serious mental and physical health issues that were made public in a July 2013 update to his habeas petition.

=== Guantanamo Joint Task Force ===
In 2009, shortly after he took office, United States President Barack Obama created a new Guantanamo Joint Task Force, with officials seconded from a range of Federal agencies, to conduct brand new assessment of captives' status. That review recommended that Idris be repatriated to Sudan.

== Idris's health ==
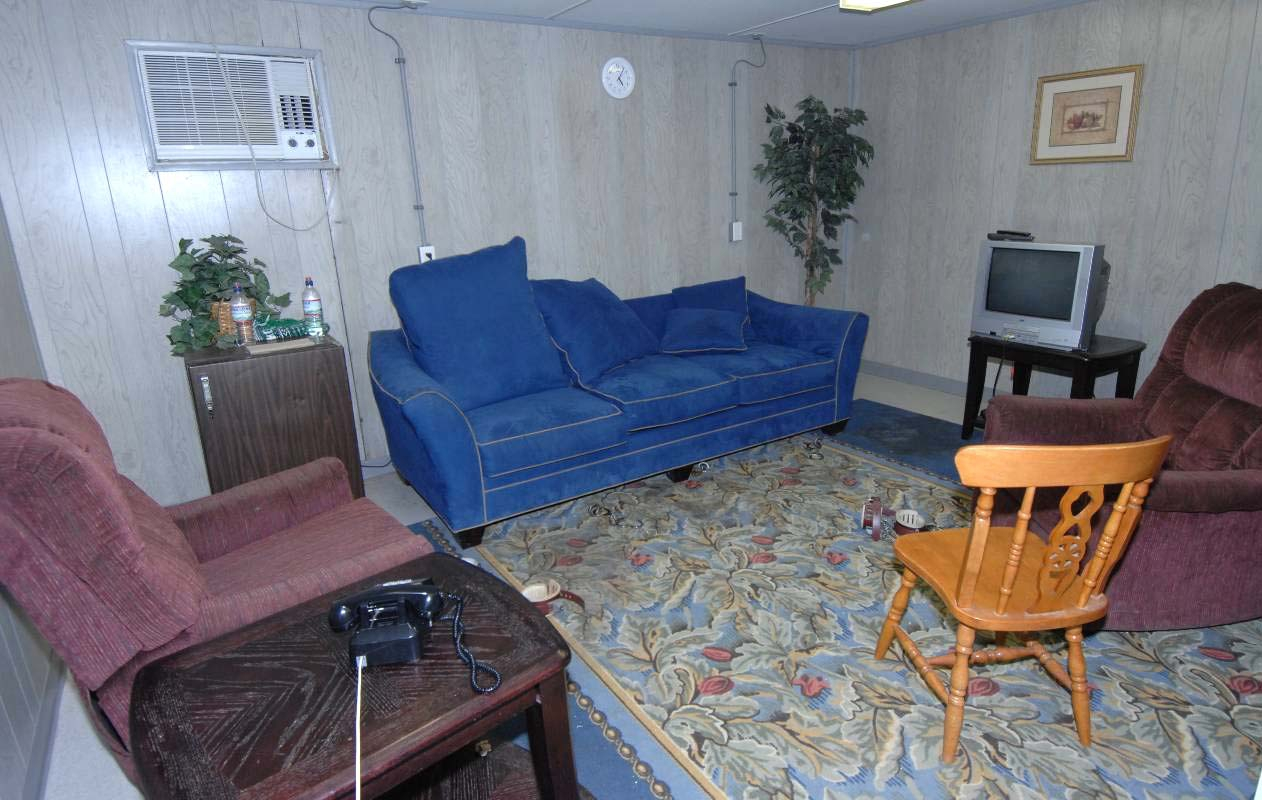
Idris's "disorganized schizophrenia" was so profound that when he was brought to a phone room, like this one, he was too confused to understand he was expected to pick up the phone's handset.

A July 2013 habeas corpus filing argued that he should be repatriated because he had health problems so severe that he could never pose a threat to the USA—even if he wanted to. Summarizing the report, Carol Rosenberg of the Miami Herald noted that he had been diagnosed with mental health problems shortly after his arrival in Guantanamo in 2002. He had since been diagnosed as having "schizophrenia, disorganized type." Rosenberg described how, when he was last scheduled to have a phone call to his habeas attorney, and was brought to the phone room, he was too confused to realize he should raise the phone's handset to his face.

Idris was reported to have occasional "lucid periods," but at other times he had fits of laughter, for no reason, sings at random, and wore his underwear on his head, and that his bizarre behavior disturbed his fellow prisoners.

The habeas filing said that Idris was morbidly obese, had diabetes, and circulatory problems.

According to Rosenberg, if the habeas motion succeeded, and he was repatriated, Sudan's culture and health infrastructure was insufficient for there to be any hope he would recover.

Idris was transferred to Sudan on December 19, 2013.

== Death ==
On February 10, 2021, Idris died at age 60 at his mother's home in Port Sudan. The exact cause was not immediately known, however Christopher Curran, a lawyer who represents Sudanese interests in Washington, D.C., attributed the death to "medical complications he had from Guantánamo."
