= Al Bāţinah =

Al Bāţinah may refer to:

- Al Batinah Region, Oman
- Al Batinah, Yemen
