= Chip Jaenichen =

American United States Navy officer

18th United States Maritime Administrator
- In office July 25, 2014 – January 13, 2017
- President: Barack Obama
- Preceded by: David T. Matsuda
- Succeeded by: Mark H. Buzby

Personal details
- Born: Paul N. Jaenichen Brandenburg, Kentucky
- Education: United States Naval Academy (BS); Old Dominion University (MS)

Military service
- Branch/service: United States Navy
- Years of service: 1982–2012

Paul N. "Chip" Jaenichen is an American retired United States Navy officer who served as the Administrator of the United States Maritime Administration from July 25, 2014, to January 13, 2017.

== Early life and education ==
Jaenichen is a native of Brandenburg, Kentucky, where he attended Meade County High School. Both of his parents had served in the United States Army. Jaenichen earned a Bachelor of Science degree in ocean engineering from United States Naval Academy and Master of Science in engineering management from Old Dominion University.

== Career ==
Jaenichen primarily served on submarines during his 30-year career with the United States Navy, including the USS Skipjack, USS Oklahoma City, the USS Baton Rouge and the USS Key West. He served as the executive officer of the USS Kentucky from 1994 to 1996. He also served as the commander of Submarine Squadron 11 in San Diego, and deputy chief of legislative affairs for the United States Department of the Navy.

In 2013, Jaenichen was selected to serve as acting United States Maritime Administration by President Barack Obama, succeeding David T. Matsuda. Jaenichen had previously served as deputy administrator under Matsuda since 2012. He was later nominated to serve as the permanent administrator. During his tenure, he advocated for the "revitalization" of the United States Merchant Marine. He also provided testimony to the United States Senate Committee on Commerce, Science, and Transportation, United States House Agriculture Subcommittee on Livestock and Foreign Agriculture, and United States House Transportation Subcommittee on Coast Guard and Maritime Transportation. He left office in 2017, and was succeeded by Mark H. Buzby.

In 2017, Jaenichen joined Liberty Global Logistics LLC as an executive vice president.
