= Loai al-Saqa =

Syrian terrorist

- Born: 1972 (age 53–54); Aleppo, Syria
- Known for: suspected of being a terrorist bomber

Loai Mohammad Haj Bakr al-Saqa (Arabic: لؤي محمد حج بكر الصقا) is a Syrian member of al-Qaeda, convicted of masterminding and financing the 2003 Istanbul bombings. In February 2007, he was sentenced to 67 life sentences in Turkey. He was suspected in several other terrorist bombings. His first conviction was overturned on appeal.

He was arrested in August 2005, while allegedly planning a bomb attack against an Israeli cruise ship. He was accused of supplying Turkish militants $170,000 to perform the bombing. Unlike some of the six Turkish men also given life sentences for the attacks, al-Saqa maintained his innocence throughout the trial.

Al-Saqa's lawyer was banned from the court for "aiding and abetting al-Qaeda", and al-Saqa was twice thrown out of the court himself, once at his first court appearance in March 2006 for refusing to stand and identify himself to the judge and again two months later for wearing an orange jumpsuit similar to those worn by prisoners in Guantanamo Bay.

During his trial, al-Saqa was questioned by prosecutor Huseyin Canan about the beheading of British engineer Kenneth Bigley in Iraq.

== Early life ==
Sakka is the son of a wealthy factory owner in Aleppo, Syria.

== Alleged jihadist career ==
According to The Washington Post, Sakka was suspected of playing a role in a plot to bomb hotels in Amman, Jordan, on 31 December 1999. They reported he was the planner of the truck bomb attacks that killed 57 in Istanbul in 2003; that he was a trusted associate of Abu Musab al-Zarqawi, and had led foreign fighters during the battle of Fallujah; and that he aided other fighters in their travels, with funding and false passports. He was captured in Antalya when a bomb exploded in his apartment on 4 August 2005.

The Washington Post reported that Turkish security officials asserted he had acknowledged that he had been constructing the bomb, which he intended to use as a suicide bomb when he guided a yacht into a cruise ship that had American GIs.

Sakka was represented by Osman Karakan. Karakan said that Sakka had willingly acknowledged his jihadist activities, and remained committed to jihadism—but was nevertheless refusing to sign a confession.

Sakka is believed to have undergone plastic surgery in order to hide from security officials.

The Washington Post reported that he drank alcohol, and hung out with unmarried women, in order to mask the fact that he was a fundamentalist. Today's Zaman reported Sakka had warned Turkish troops in Afghanistan that they could be faced with “disaster”.

“Turkish [military] vehicles carry CIA agents in Afghanistan. The public should understand this fact. I’d like to warn [Turkish] soldiers about the disaster they could be faced with if they continue their activities. The Turkish military has been implicated in activities for which resister [Islam] combatants will never forgive them. I am calling the Turkish public as a friend. Save your children from Afghanistan.”

On February 7, 2012, investigators from the United Nations interviewed Sakka, interested in whether he had played a role in the assassination of Lebanon's Prime Minister Refik Hariri.

On 21 March 2012, the judge in Sakka's case barred him from the courtroom, because he was wearing an orange jumpsuit, similar to those made infamous for being issued to Guantanamo captives.
