= Furah =

- Location in Yemen
- Coordinates: 15°7′5″N 42°33′5″E
- Country: Yemen
- Governorate: Al Hudaydah Governorate
- Time zone: UTC+3 (Yemen Standard Time)

Furah (Arabic: فُرح) is a coastal town on Kamaran Island, Yemen. It is located at around 15°17′5″N 42°33′5″E.
