= Mohammed Abdullah Saleh al-Asad =

Mohammed al-Asad
- Born: 1960
- Arrested: 26 December 2003; Tanzania; Tanzanian Police, CIA
- Released: 2005; Yemen
- Died: 2016 (aged 55–56); Yemen
- Citizenship: Yemen
- Detained at: CIA black sites
- Charge: extrajudicial detention
- Status: released without charge in 2005

Mohammed Assad (a/k/a "al-Assad", "al-Asaad" and "al-Asad"; 1960–2016) was a citizen of Yemen who, according to Amnesty International, was subjected to extraordinary rendition by the CIA, and held in the CIA's network of black sites—secret interrogation centers. Assad had been living and working in Tanzania. Amnesty International reports he was captured on December 26, 2003, and held by the CIA until May 2005.

Asad claimed that the only thing he was asked about during his interrogation was the Al-Haramain Foundation, which the Bush administration has listed as a charity tied to terrorism. His interrogators believed he had worked for Al-Haramain.

In May 2005, Muhammad Assad, and two other Yemenis, Salah Ali and Muhammad Bashmilah, were transferred to Yemeni custody.

In November 2005 Anne Fitzgerald, a policy researcher for Amnesty International, spoke about interviews she conducted with the three men. She said that she found the men's accounts credible, because their accounts of CIA custody were consistent, even though they had never been detained together, either in their US custody, or in Yemeni custody. According to Fitzgerald, the three describe being held in solitary confinement, isolated from all contact with the outside world, under conditions Amnesty International described as "sensory deprivation".

According to The Washington Post, as of November 2005, all three men remained in Yemeni custody. Muhammad Assad was held in a "security prison at Al Ghaydah".

The Washington Post contacted the CIA, and reported that CIA officials declined to refute or confirm the Amnesty International account.

In December, 2014, the United States Senate Intelligence Committee released a 600-page summary of a massive analysis of the CIA's use of torture. According to Newsweek, the report was the first time the US had officially acknowledged that al-Asad was held, and treated abusively, by the CIA. Newsweek described al-Asad as being "wrongfully detained".

Al-Asad died in May 2016.

On October 8, 2016, The New York Times started publishing a series of articles on the ongoing mental problems suffered by individuals who had been tortured by the US. Al-Asad was one of the individuals whose problems they described.
