= Sulaiman al-Nahdi =

Sulaiman Awath Sulaiman Bin Ageel Al Nahdi
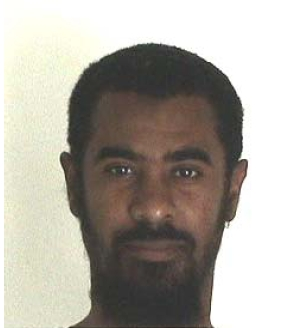
- Suleman Awad Suleman Bin Agil Alnahdi
- Born: December 1, 1974 (age 51); Mukalla, Yemen
- Released: 2015-11-16; UAE
- Detained at: Guantanamo
- ISN: 511
- Charge(s): No charge, held in extrajudicial detention

Sulaiman Awath Sulaiman Bin Ageel Al Nahdi is a citizen of Yemen, who held in extrajudicial detention in the United States Guantanamo Bay detainment camps, in Cuba, from May 5, 2002, until November 16, 2015. Al Nahdi's Guantanamo Internment Serial Number is 511. The Department of Defense reports that al Nahdi was born on December 1, 1974, in Mukalla, Yemen.

Al Nahdi was cleared for release in 2008, but he wasn't released until late 2015, when he and five other Yemenis were sent to the United Arab Emirates.

== Official status reviews ==
Initially the Bush administration asserted that they could withhold all the protections of the Geneva Conventions to captives from the war on terror. This policy was challenged before the Judicial branch. Critics argued that the USA could not evade its obligation to conduct competent tribunals to determine whether captives are, or are not, entitled to the protections of prisoner of war status.

Subsequently the Department of Defense instituted the Combatant Status Review Tribunals. The Tribunals, however, were not authorized to determine whether the captives were lawful combatants—rather they were merely empowered to make a recommendation as to whether the captive had previously been correctly determined to match the Bush administration's definition of an enemy combatant.

Scholars at the Brookings Institution, led by Benjamin Wittes, listed the captives still held in Guantanamo in December 2008, according to whether their detention was justified by certain common allegations:

- Sulaiman Awath Sulaiman Bin Ageel Al Nahdi was listed as one of the captives who the Wittes team unable to identify as presently cleared for release or transfer.
- Sulaiman Awath Sulaiman Bin Ageel Al Nahdi was listed as one of the captives who "The military alleges ... are associated with both Al Qaeda and the Taliban".
- Sulaiman Awath Sulaiman Bin Ageel Al Nahdi was listed as one of the captives who "The military alleges ... traveled to Afghanistan for jihad".
- Sulaiman Awath Sulaiman Bin Ageel Al Nahdi was listed as one of the captives who "The military alleges that the following detainees stayed in Al Qaeda, Taliban or other guest- or safehouses".
- Sulaiman Awath Sulaiman Bin Ageel Al Nahdi was listed as one of the captives who "The military alleges ... took military or terrorist training in Afghanistan".
- Sulaiman Awath Sulaiman Bin Ageel Al Nahdi was listed as one of the captives who "The military alleges ... were at Tora Bora".
- Sulaiman Awath Sulaiman Bin Ageel Al Nahdi was listed as one of the captives whose "names or aliases were found on material seized in raids on Al Qaeda safehouses and facilities".
- Sulaiman Awath Sulaiman Bin Ageel Al Nahdi was listed as one of the captives who was a foreign fighter.
- Sulaiman Awath Sulaiman Bin Ageel Al Nahdi was listed as one of the captives who "deny affiliation with Al Qaeda or the Taliban yet admit facts that, under the broad authority the laws of war give armed parties to detain the enemy, offer the government ample legal justification for its detention decisions".
- Sulaiman Awath Sulaiman Bin Ageel Al Nahdi was listed as one of the captives who had admitted "fighting on behalf of Al Qaeda or the Taliban".

Al Nahdi chose to submit a written statement to his Combatant Status Review Tribunal rather than attend in person.

=== Al Nahdi's statement ===
Al Nahdi's statement said that the allegations against him contained exaggeration.

Al Nahdi said he traveled to Afghanistan because he was moved by the plight of children. He was moved by cleric's speeches and the images on TV.

Al Nahdi's statement acknowledges that someone paid his travel expenses, without mentioning who paid for him. He pointed out he traveled there prior to the attacks of September 11, 2001. His travel had nothing to do with a hatred of America. He asserted he had no problems with America. He asserted he played no role in the conflict between the Taliban and the Northern Alliance.

Al Nahdi denied being a member of al Qaeda—he said he had never heard of al Qaeda until he was arrested.

Al Nahdi acknowledged attending an Afghan training camp, where he saw Osama bin Laden, but he said he had nothing to do with him, and did not identify with what bin Laden was saying. He asserted bin Laden should be charged for what he did. He pleaded that bin Laden's crimes shouldn't be taken out on him.

Al Nahdi said he had promised his mother he would stay in Afghanistan for no more than six months.

Al Nahdi said he had been well behaved at Guantanamo, with the exception of once throwing juice at a guard when he was upset when he learned his mother had died.

Al Nahdi chose to participate in his 2005 Administrative Review Board hearing, and the DoD published a 16 page transcript.

== Habeas corpus petition ==
Al Nahdi had a writ or habeas corpus filed on his behalf in 2005.

The Military Commissions Act of 2006 mandated that Guantanamo captives were no longer entitled to access the US civil justice system, so all outstanding habeas corpus petitions were stayed.

On June 12, 2008, the United States Supreme Court ruled, in Boumediene v. Bush, that the Military Commissions Act could not remove the right for Guantanamo captives to access the U.S. Federal Court system, and all previous Guantanamo captives' habeas petitions were eligible to be re-instated. The judges considering the captives' habeas petitions would be considering whether the evidence used to compile the allegations the men and boys were enemy combatants justified a classification of "enemy combatant".

On July 17, 2008, Richard Murphy filed a "Petitioner's request for 30-day notice of removal or transfer" on behalf of al Nahdi and six other captives. The petition would prevent the Department of Defense from transferring him out of U.S. jurisdiction without giving his attorney's thirty days notice. The Department of Defense had transferred some captives to countries where they were subsequently subjected to abusive treatment—even though they had active habeas corpus petitions.

== Life at Guantanamo ==
In 2008, the Cleveland Plain Dealer reported on efforts to provide intellectual stimulation for the captives. They reported that camp authorities had recently hire a full time English language instructor and a full time Arabic language instructor. In addition interested captives were instructed in the rudiments of drawing and painting, and were given access to art supplies. Al Nahdi had used his time in art class to prepare what his lawyer described as a "greeting card", which he gave to her, to take back to share with staff at her office—only to have military censors classify it, and stamp it with a "secret" stamp.

In articles marking the camp's tenth anniversary, both Associated Press and the McClatchy News Service noted that al-Nahdi remained in the camp even though he had been cleared years earlier.
