= Nishtun =

- Location in Yemen
- Coordinates: 15°49′26″N 52°11′3″E
- Country: Yemen
- Governorate: Al Mahrah Governorate
- Time zone: UTC+3 (Yemen Standard Time)

Nishtun (Arabic: نشطون) is a coastal town in southeastern Yemen. It is located at around 15°49′26″N 52°11′3″E.

Nishtun is one of Al Mahrah Governorate In Al Ghaydah district with a population of 1,165 people.
