= Harbi al-Himyari =

Semi-legendary alchemist and teacher of Jabir ibn Hayyan

Ḥarbī al-Ḥimyarī (Arabic: حربي الحميري) is a semi-legendary Himyarite sage who appears several times in the writings attributed to the Islamic alchemist Jābir ibn Ḥayyān (died c. 806−816). He is said there to have been one of Jabir's teachers, and to have been 463 years old when Jabir met him. One of Jabir's lost works was dedicated to Harbi al-Himyari's contributions to alchemy, a fact which may point to the existence in Jabir's time of a written work attributed to him.
