= Karam Khamis Sayd Khamsan =

Yemeni Guantanamo detainee

- Born: 1969 (age 55–56); Al Mahra, Yemen
- Arrested: December 24, 2005; Afghanistan
- Released: August 19, 2005; Yemen
- Citizenship: Yemen
- Detained at: Guantanamo Bay detainment camp
- ISN: 586
- Status: Repatriated

Karam Khamis Sayd Khamsan (also transliterated as Karama Khamis and Khamis Al-Mulaiki) is a citizen of Yemen who was held in extrajudicial detention in the United States Guantanamo Bay detainment camps, in Cuba. His Guantanamo Internment Serial Number was 586. American intelligence analysts estimate that Khamsan was born in 1969, in Al Mahra, Yemen. He was repatriated without ever being charged on August 19, 2005.

== Abuse while in detention ==
The New Standard News reports that during Amnesty International's interview with Khamsan he reported being abused.

Khamsan reported being beaten, stripped naked, and being stacked in a pile with other naked captives, and then photographed, while held in Bagram. He also reported being threatened with rendition to Egypt or Jordan. Elements of the 519th Military Intelligence Battalion, under Captain Carolyn Wood, were responsible for the interrogation of captives in Bagram, before being transferred to Abu Ghraib, where they were to play a role in the abuse recorded in the photos that started to be released in the winter of 2005.

Khamsan told Amnesty International that, during the long flight to Guantanamo, his handcuffs were so tight they ripped off his flesh, when they were removed. Amnesty's report quoted Khamsan about his abuse in Guantanamo:

In Guantánamo, Karama Khamisan described how, on one occasion, he was taken to the shower room where guards attempted to sexually abuse him. As he pushed them away, ten guards entered the room and beat him before transferring him to a solitary cell where he was held for 25 days, naked. He said that he was only taken to use the toilet and shower once in this entire period and that he ate no solid food in order to avoid having to defecate in his cell.

== Determined not to have been an Enemy Combatant ==
The Washington Post reports that Khamsan was one of 38 detainees who was determined not to have been an enemy combatant during his Combatant Status Review Tribunal. They report that Khamsan has been released. The Department of Defense refers to these men as No Longer Enemy Combatants. Three men Maroof Saleemovich Salehove, Karam Khamis Sayd Khamsan and Mohamed Anwar Kurd were sent home on August 19, 2005.

== Yemeni arrest and acquittal ==
The Americans eventually concluded that Khamis was not part of al Qaeda, but that his presence in Afghanistan was due to his membership in a drug smuggling ring. Consequently, he was repatriated to Yemen.

According to the Yemen Observer Khamis was arrested on December 24, 2005, when he tried to approach the US Ambassador, while armed with a pistol and two hand grenades. The Yemen Times says the alleged threat to the Ambassador was in December 2004. Khamis has been charged with attempted assassination.

The Yemen Times' account says a conspirator has confessed that the impromptu attack was fueled by qat, a local narcotic, and anti-American sermons by radical clergy. Khamis's defense lawyer have requested bringing in foreign medical experts to attest to his mental state. Khamis was acquitted on March 13, 2006.
