= Haitham al-Yemeni =

Yemeni terrorist

- Died: May 2005; North Waziristan
- Occupations: terrorist, explosive expert
- Military career
- Allegiance: Al-Qaeda
- Branch: Al-Qaeda central (?-2005)
- Service years: ?-2005
- Rank: AQ officer and Explosives expert War in North-West Pakistan

Haitham al-Yemeni (Arabic: هيثم اليمني) (?? – May 2005) was an al Qaeda explosives expert from Yemen. He was killed in North Waziristan, northwest Pakistan, near the Afghanistan border, in early May 2005 in a drone attack by an unmanned CIA-operated RQ-1 Predator aircraft. The CIA never released a statement about his death, such a report may be sensitive due to the killing having taken place in Pakistani territory. The killing was ordered by the CIA due to fears that he was about to go into hiding.

Note: Various news sources spell his first name as "Haitham" or "Haithem".
