= Sayfaf =

- Location in Yemen
- Coordinates: 15°27′N 42°38′E
- Country: Yemen
- Governorate: Al Hudaydah Governorate
- Time zone: UTC+3 (Yemen Standard Time)

Sayfaf (Arabic: صيفاف) is a coastal town in Kamaran Island, Yemen. It is located at around 15°27′N 42°38′E.
