= Muhammad al-Gharsi =

Yemeni poet

Muhammad al-Gharsi is one of the most famous modern Yemeni poets. He is a friend of Ali Abdullah Saleh, the former President of Yemen and former President of the Yemen Arab Republic (North Yemen). Before the unification of Yemen, al-Gharsi was viewed as "an eloquent spokesman for the republican regime".
