= American Association of Yemeni Students and Professionals =

U.S. organization

The American Association of Yemeni Students and Professionals (AAYSP), formerly the American Association of Yemeni Scientists and Professionals, was founded in 2002 by two Yemeni scientists who both shared a common vision of helping promote higher education among Yemenis.

== Chapters ==
Currently, AAYSP has chapters in New York, Rhode Island, California (Bay Area), Chicago, Michigan, and Washington, D.C. AAYSP has held four conferences in 2006 and 2008 in Washington, D.C., and in 2010 and 2011 in Dearborn, Michigan.

=== Michigan Chapter ===
Started by some college students and professionals in November 2008, after AAYSP held its Leadership Conference in Dearborn. The Michigan Chapter currently works with metro Detroit public schools to collaboratively work toward enriching students with college information and scholarships.
