= Makram =

- Location in Yemen
- Coordinates: 15°23′0″N 42°33′37″E
- Country: Yemen
- Governorate: Al Hudaydah Governorate
- 16,794
- Time zone: UTC+3 (Yemen Standard Time)

Makram (Arabic: مكرم) is a coastal town on Kamaran Island in the Red Sea. It is situated in the Al Hudaydah Governorate of Yemen, at 15°23′0″N 42°33′37″E.
