= Faysal al-Shaabi =

Prime Minister of South Yemen

Faysal Abd al-Latif al-Shaabi
- فيصل عبد اللطيف الشعبي
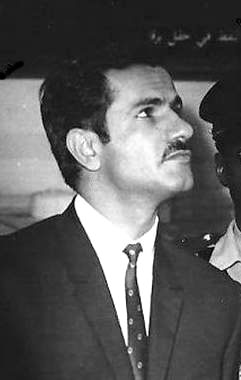
- Faysal in 1969

1st Prime Minister of the People's Republic of South Yemen
- In office 6 April 1969 – 22 June 1969
- Preceded by: Position established
- Succeeded by: Muhammad Ali Haitham

Personal details
- Born: 1935 Lahij, Sultanate of Lahej, Bombay Presidency, Aden Protectorate, British India
- Died: 2 April 1970 (aged 34–35) Aden, South Yemen
- Party: NLF
- Relations: Zainab al-Shaabi (sister); Qahtan al-Shaabi (cousin and brother-in-law)
- Parent: Sheik Abd al-Latif Abd al-Qawi al-Shaabi

Faysal Abd al-Latif al-Shaabi (Arabic: فيصل عبد الطيف الشعبي; 1935 – 2 April 1970) was briefly the Prime Minister of the People's Republic of South Yemen, from 6 April 1969 until the political coup (Corrective Move) that led to Salim Ali Rubai's ascendance to power on 22 June 1969. Al-Shaabi was appointed prime minister by President Qahtan Mohammed al-Shaabi. After being ousted, al-Shaabi was kept under house arrest, but was moved to a detention camp at the end of March 1970. On 3 April 1970, the government radio in Aden broadcast a report that al-Shaabi "was fatally wounded when he tried to escape the detention camp."

Political offices
Preceded by none	Prime Minister of South Yemen; 1969	Succeeded by Muhammad Ali Haitham
