= Thamud, Yemen =

Thamud
- Location in Yemen
- Coordinates: 17°18′N 49°55′E
- Country: Yemen
- Governorate: Hadhramaut Governorate
- Time zone: UTC+3 (Yemen Standard Time)

Thamud (Arabic: ثمود) is a town in northeastern Yemen. It is located at around 17°18′0″N 49°55′0″E.

== Climate ==
Thamud has a hot desert climate (Köppen climate classification: BWh). The average annual temperature is 24.1 °C. The average annual rainfall is 90 mm.

Climate data for Thamud
Month	Jan	Feb	Mar	Apr	May	Jun	Jul	Aug	Sep	Oct	Nov	Dec	Year
Mean daily maximum °C (°F)	23.4 (74.1)	25.1 (77.2)	28.0 (82.4)	30.8 (87.4)	33.5 (92.3)	35.1 (95.2)	33.8 (92.8)	33.5 (92.3)	32.6 (90.7)	30.2 (86.4)	27.1 (80.8)	24.7 (76.5)	29.8 (85.7)
Daily mean °C (°F)	17.8 (64.0)	19.5 (67.1)	22.3 (72.1)	25.0 (77.0)	27.8 (82.0)	29.2 (84.6)	28.4 (83.1)	28.1 (82.6)	27.1 (80.8)	23.9 (75.0)	20.9 (69.6)	19.0 (66.2)	24.1 (75.3)
Mean daily minimum °C (°F)	12.2 (54.0)	13.9 (57.0)	16.6 (61.9)	19.2 (66.6)	22.2 (72.0)	23.4 (74.1)	23.0 (73.4)	22.8 (73.0)	21.6 (70.9)	17.7 (63.9)	14.7 (58.5)	13.4 (56.1)	18.4 (65.1)
Average precipitation mm (inches)	18 (0.7)	12 (0.5)	15 (0.6)	16 (0.6)	4 (0.2)	0 (0)	0 (0)	1 (0.0)	0 (0)	1 (0.0)	9 (0.4)	14 (0.6)	90 (3.6)
Source: Climate-Data.org
