= Steroh =

- Location in Yemen
- Coordinates: 12°20′35″N 53°55′0″E
- Country: Yemen (recognized)
- Governorate: Socotra Governorate
- Island: Socotra
- Time zone: UTC+3 (Yemen Standard Time)

Steroh (Arabic: ستيروح, romanized: Stīrūḥ) is a coastal town in southern Socotra, Yemen. It is located at around 12°20′35″N 53°55′0″E.

== See also ==
- List of cities in Socotra archipelago
