= Sanaa school shooting =

1997 school shooting

- Mohammad Ahman al-Nazari during his trial
- Location: 15.2859°N 44.2371°E; Sanaa, Yemen
- Date: 30 March 1997
- Attack type: School shooting, mass murder, mass shooting
- Weapon: Kalashnikov assault rifle
- Deaths: 6
- Injuries: 12
- Perpetrator: Mohammad Ahman al-Nazari
- Motive: Alleged rape of daughter

The Sanaa school shooting was a school shooting where Mohammad Ahman al-Nazari killed six people in Sanaa, Yemen, on 30 March 1997. Nazari was convicted for the killings and sentenced to death. He was executed a week later.

== Background ==
Nazari was a 48-year-old resident of Sanaa, Yemen, and a veteran of the Soviet–Afghan War, where he had fought alongside the Mujahideen against the Soviet Union during their invasion of Afghanistan. Nazari's five children attended the Tala'i Private School in the Asbahi neighbourhood of Sana'a, where it was alleged that one of his daughters had been molested by the school administrator, despite a lack of evidence to confirm the allegation. Nazari had also previously been employed as a bus driver for Tala'i Private School and the nearby Musa Bin Nusayr School but was fired for unknown reasons sometime before the shooting.

== Shooting ==
Armed with a Kalashnikov assault rifle, Nazari waited at the school for the headmistress and killed her by shooting her in the head. After which he killed a teacher and three other school attendees, Nazari did this by entering the school building and shooting indiscriminately at teachers and students alike. Subsequently, he went to the nearby Musa Bin Nusayr School, where he continued his shooting rampage. A total of 11 other people from both schools were injured. Both schools were damaged with bullet holes in the walls and exterior of the schools.

=== Victims ===
- Asma Abd al-Bari, headmistress of Tala'i Private School
- Muhammad Yahya al-Ulufi, a teacher at Tala'i Private School
- Husayn Ali Qa'id al-Ba'dani
- Ali Muhammad Muqbil al-Awadi
- Imad Muhammad al-Raymi
- Unidentified student

== Eyewitness reports ==
Eyewitness 1 said he first saw the headmistress lying on the floor bloodied up (pointing to the exact area), "and another staff member dead at the other side, then as we tried attending to the dead, gunmen starting shooting again, so we ran and we hid from him and then as we came out again and we saw him opening fire on the other side and then the soldiers showed up, he starting shooting at them and was finally shot and captured by them."

Eyewitness 2 said that in the beginning he was sleeping and heard gunfire, which woke him up immediately. The witness then stepped out of the door and saw somebody dead. He then ducked for cover and saw the gunmen hop in his bus and head to a neighbouring school where he killed a child. Then the witness said: "We saw him but he then disappeared again and I then saw the headmistress lying on the floor and then the gunmen started firing again (in the neighbouring school)".

== Arrest and conviction ==
Nazari managed to kill six and wound 11 before he was eventually injured and arrested by police. After officially being declared sane, Nazari (whose name was also reported as being Hassan Ali al-Baadani or Muhammad Ahmad al-Naziri) was taken to trial, where he was found guilty of the six murders and sentenced to death the next day. Nazari's daughters had fought against the courts, pleading that their father was mentally unstable. The court refused this plead stating that the defendant had clearly shown the ability to attend court and conduct himself in a fit manner, as well as being checked by three different doctors at the Al Sabeen hospital, who all stated that the defendant was fit enough to understand the severity and seriousness of his actions. The following day, the Yemeni President Ali Abdullah Saleh visited some of those injured in the attack.

=== Execution ===
On 5 April 1997, Nazari was executed by firing squad with five shots in the chest in an empty lot located between the two schools where he had committed the shootings. After his execution, the initial sentence for Nazari's corpse to be crucified in a public area for three days was repealed; instead, the corpse was kicked to a pulp by angry citizens and burned in the streets of Sanaa.

The daughter who the school administrator allegedly raped committed suicide five years later, while Nazari's other four children reportedly all died in an accident in 2006.

== See also ==
- List of massacres in Yemen
