= Muhammad al-Ansi =

Yemeni detainee (born 1975)

Muhammad Ahmad Abdallah al-Ansi
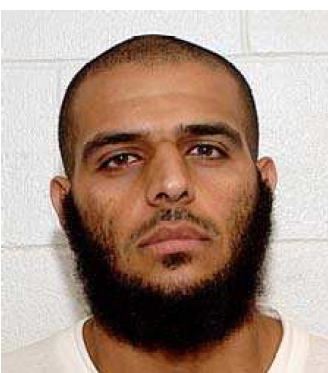
- Born: 1975 (age 50–51); Sanaa, Yemen
- Detained at: Guantanamo
- ISN: 29
- Charge(s): No charge, held in extrajudicial detention

Muhammad Ahmad Abdallah al-Ansi (Arabic: محمد أحمد عبد الله الأنسي) is a citizen of Yemen, held in extrajudicial detention in the United States Guantanamo Bay detention camps, in Cuba. His Guantanamo Internee Security Number is 029. American intelligence analysts estimate he was born in 1975, in Sanaa, Yemen. He was cleared for release on December 9, 2016, a recommendation made public on December 22. He was transferred to Oman with nine other men on January 16, 2017.

== Official status reviews ==
Originally, the Bush Presidency asserted that captives apprehended in the "war on terror" were not covered by the Geneva Conventions, and could be held indefinitely, without charge, and without an open and transparent review of the justifications for their detention.

In 2004, the United States Supreme Court ruled, in Rasul v. Bush, that Guantanamo captives were entitled to being informed of the allegations justifying their detention, and were entitled to try to refute them.

=== Office for the Administrative Review of Detained Enemy Combatants ===
Combatant Status Review Tribunals were held in a 3x5 meter trailer where the captive sat with his hands and feet shackled to a bolt in the floor.

Following the Supreme Court's ruling, the Department of Defense set up the Office for the Administrative Review of Detained Enemy Combatants.

Scholars at the Brookings Institution, led by Benjamin Wittes, listed the captives still held in Guantanamo in December 2008, according to whether their detention was justified by certain common allegations:

- Muhammad Ahmad Abdallah al-Ansi was listed as one of the captives whom the "military alleges ... are associated with both Al Qaeda and the Taliban".
- Muhammad Ahmad Abdallah al-Ansi was listed as one of the captives whom the "military alleges ... traveled to Afghanistan for jihad."
- Muhammad Ahmad Abdallah al-Ansi was listed as one of the captives whom the "military alleges ... took military or terrorist training in Afghanistan."
- Muhammad Ahmad Abdallah al-Ansi was listed as one of the captives whom the "military alleges ... were at Tora Bora."
- Muhammad Ahmad Abdallah al-Ansi was listed as one of the captives whom the "military alleges ... served on Osama Bin Laden's security detail."
- Muhammad Ahmad Abdallah al-Ansi was listed as one of the captives who was an "al Qaeda operative".
- Muhammad Ahmad Abdallah al-Ansi was listed as one of the captives who had "denied all the government allegations."

He chose to participate in his Combatant Status Review Tribunal. Shortly after his Tribunal procedures were explained to him, al-Ansi reportedly expressed concern over how long the Tribunal would last. He asked to leave. The Tribunal reconvened after he had been removed long enough for the Tribunal's president to review al-Ansi's election form, which recorded that he had originally wanted to attend his Tribunal. Al-Ansi chose to participate in his Administrative Review Board hearing.

Al-Ansi had requested a copy of the proceedings of his Tribunal. He told his Board that he had requested it five days prior to his Board. He told his Board that other detainees had been given copies of their Tribunals. The Board went into closed session to consider his request. When they reconvened in open session he was reportedly told that he could not access his Tribunal record as it was classified.

=== Writ of Habeas Corpus ===
Al Ansi had a writ of habeas corpus, Civil Action No. 08-cv-1923, filed on his behalf.

The Military Commissions Act of 2006 mandated that Guantanamo captives were no longer entitled to access the US civil justice system, so all outstanding habeas corpus petitions were stayed.

On June 12, 2008, the United States Supreme Court ruled, in Boumediene v. Bush, that the Military Commissions Act could not remove the right for Guantanamo captives to access the U.S. Federal Court system. Further, all previous Guantanamo captives' habeas petitions were eligible to be re-instated. The judges considering the captives' habeas petitions would be considering whether the evidence used to compile the allegations the men and boys were enemy combatants justified a classification of "enemy combatant".

Al-Ansi's petition was filed after the Supreme Court's ruling in Boumediene v. Bush. In late December 2008, the United States Department of Justice proposed amalgamating fifteen separate petitions, including Al-Ansi's, because they claimed those captives were all captured in Tora Bora.

On December 30, 2008, United States Department of Justice official Daniel M. Barish informed the court that the DoJ had filed "factual returns" in seven habeas cases, including al-Ansi's.

=== Formerly secret Joint Task Force Guantanamo assessment ===
On April 25, 2011, whistleblower organization WikiLeaks published formerly secret assessments drafted by Joint Task Force Guantanamo analysts. His 10-page Joint Task Force Guantanamo assessment was drafted on May 17, 2008. It was signed by camp commandant Rear Admiral David M. Thomas Jr. He recommended continued detention.

=== Guantanamo Joint Review Task Force ===
In April 2015, Jason Leopold succeeded in getting access to the list of 71 individuals who were not cleared for release, and not recommended for holding for trial, who were determined to be eligible for Periodic Review Board hearings. Al-Ansi was one of the individuals the task force recommended should face indefinite detention, without charge.

== Artwork ==
In 2016, Al Ansi created a painting called Titanic while detained at Guantanamo Bay. He created the work from memory based upon being shown the Titanic film during his interrogation. He also created a painting of the Statue of Liberty. The artworks were two of seven works created by inmates, and it was displayed at John Jay College, New York, in the autumn of 2017.
