= Lost in a Fairy Tale =

Lost in a Fairy Tale is the first collection of poems written in the English language in Yemen. It was published on March 19, 2011 which is Yemeni Journalism Day. Despite this, the book signing ceremony was held at the Change Square in Sana'a on April 10, 2011. The collection was written by Yemeni journalist Raghda Gamal. The collection contains 33 poems across nine chapters which revolve around relationships, friendship, family, home, passion, frustration, grief and the inner thoughts of Arab women.
