= Sharifa Fatima =

Zaydi leader, 15th century Yemen

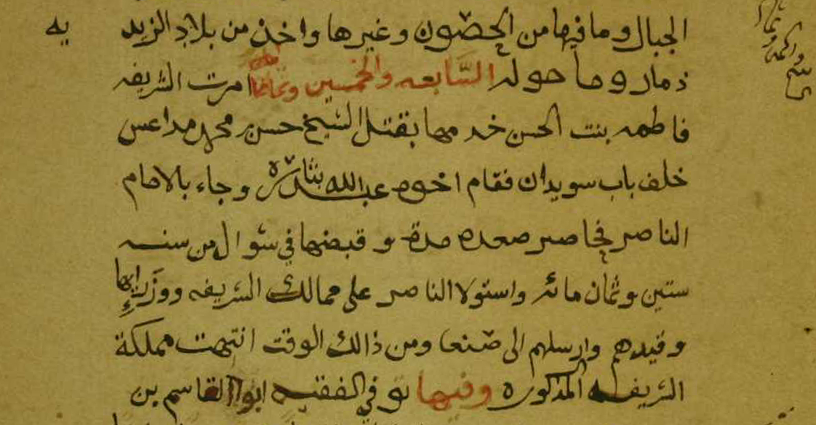
A passage about Fatima from the book Aq‘iq Yamani by Abdullah bin Ali al Dhamadi (d. 1667). The text reads: 856 the sharifa Fatima bint al-Hassan ordered her servants to kill the sheikh Hassan bin Muhammed Muda‘is behind the Sowaidan Gate in Sa‘dah. His brother Abdullah seeking revenge turned to imam An-Nasir who besieged Sa‘dah for a while, then took the city in Shawwal 860, captured sharifa's domains and her councels, chained them, and transferred them to San‘a. And from this time on, the sharifa's kingdom and any mention of it cease to exist.

Sharifa Fatima (الشَّرِيفة فاطِمَة; d. during or after 1461; sharifa is an honorific, her proper name being Fatima bint al-Hassan) was a female Zaydi Sayyid chief in 15th century Yemen.

She allegedly conquered Sa'dah and Najran. She was the granddaughter of Zaydi imam Al-Nasir Muhammad Salah al-Din. (Note: Mernissi (2006, p. 20) erroneously claims that Fatima conquered San'a. She also calls her daughter of imam and makes Zayd part of his name. Since her book is the only source on Fatima’s life available in Western languages, these errors often get repeated by other feminist authors who cite her work.)

== Life ==
Fatima was the daughter of Hasan and the paternal granddaughter of imam Al-Nasir Muhammad Salah al-Din (d. 1391). She married her cousin an-Nasir Muhammad, son of imam Al-Mansur Ali bin Salah ad-Din (d. 1436). The couple had one child, a daughter named Badr.

In 1436, her uncle and father-in-law the imam died of the plague, and was succeeded by her spouse, who however died himself shortly after. As he lacked male heirs, Sharifa Fatima herself came to be in a position of power. The Zaydi, however, could not accept a woman in the position of imam, and therefore chose her distant relative Al-Mahdi Salah ad-Din as imam: she also married him.

Her spouse was, however, challenged in his position as imam by two other distant relations: Al-Mutawakkil al-Mutahhar and Al-Mansur an-Nasir. Her spouse was captured by Al-Mansur an-Nasir, and died in captivity in 1445. Fatima herself escaped captivity and established herself as an independent ruler with her base in Dhofar and Saada. During this period, she was the de facto leader of her own fraction of the Zaydi's.

When Al-Mansur an-Nasir failed to defeat her, they made peace by an alliance symbolized by marriage between Al-Mansur an-Nasir and her daughter Badr. In 1453, she executed Cheikh Saad Hasan bin Muhammad accused of planning to join Al-Mansur an-Nasir against her. The brother of the executed sided with Al-Mansur an-Nasir, who in 1456 successfully sieged Saada and took her as prisoner to Sana'a.

In 1461, Sana'a was taken by Al-Mutawakkil al-Mutahhar, who took both her as well as Al-Mansur an-Nasir prisoner. Shortly after, the castle was stormed by the followers of Al-Mansur an-Nasir. It is not mentioned what happened to Fatima, it is only stated that she died.
