= Al Marqab, Yemen =

Al Marqab
- Location in Yemen
- Coordinates: 14°30′59″N 44°03′37″E
- Country: Yemen
- Governorate: Dhamar Governorate
- Elevation: 9,035 ft (2,754 m)
- Time zone: UTC+3 (Yemen Standard Time)

Al Marqab is a village in Dhamar Governorate in western Yemen at 2754 m. elevation.
