= Al Batinah, Yemen =

Al Batinah
- Location in Yemen
- Coordinates: 15°49′N 48°24′E
- Country: Yemen
- Governorate: Hadhramaut
- Time zone: UTC+3 (Yemen Standard Time)

Al Batinah is a settlement in Yemen.
