= Guantanamo Bay detainee uniforms =

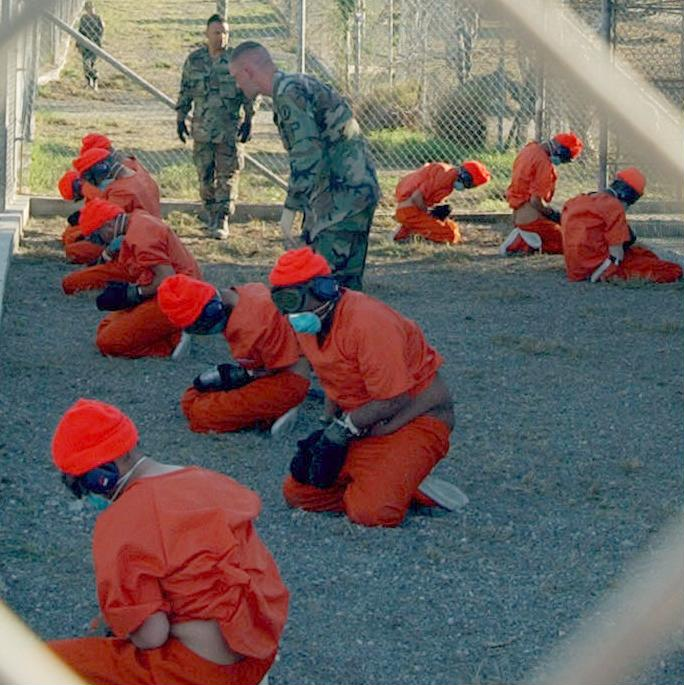
"Non-compliant" captives wearing orange uniforms held in Guantanamo's Camp X-Ray in 2002

The prison uniforms worn by detainees held at the US-run Guantanamo Bay detention camp are solid orange or solid white. The orange boiler-suit worn by many detainees held during the war on terror became a global symbol of the camp.

== Uniforms ==
Detainees are typically issued one of two uniforms, either a white jumpsuit if the prisoner has been labeled "compliant", or an orange jumpsuit if the detainee has been labeled "non-compliant". The uniforms were supplied by a firm in Fuquay-Varina, North Carolina.

When the detainees face Combatant Status Review Tribunals or Administrative Review Board hearings, they were frequently asked to explain their uniforms to the overseeing officer, and they were considered a point in favor of further detaining or releasing the prisoner.

In his testimony during his 2006 Administrative Review Board hearing, Khirullah Khairkhwa described being issued a black uniform when guards (falsely) came to believe he was contemplating suicide.

== Use outside Guantanamo Bay ==
Once insurgents began capturing and in some cases executing foreigners in Iraq, there was a tendency to dress them in the same orange jumpsuits as their own forces were being dressed in when delivered to Guantanamo Bay. This has been considered by some to be a sign of the insurgents inflicting the same humiliation and dehumaization on their captives, or a protest against Guantanamo detainees being held without trial.

On March 16, 2006, Secretary of State legal adviser John B. Bellinger III gave a digital press conference in which he dismissed the view that all the prisoners were being held in orange jumpsuits, stating "Very few people wear orange jump suits anymore, and yet that is the image that is being left with people all around the world, that everybody in Guantanamo is wearing an orange jump suit." It has been described as "a symbol of American global power" being imposed outside national and international laws and conventions, and, when used by ISIS, as a symbol of Western imperialism.

A number of protests against the prison camp have seen activists dress in the iconic orange jumpsuits to draw attention to the issue. In May 2006, a Turkish judge barred Loai al-Saqa, a suspected terrorist, from being brought into his own trial, because he chose to wear an orange jumpsuit for the hearing, demonstrative of his solidarity with those in Guantanamo, and his intentions to protest or resist legal authority.

Artist Steve Powers's Animatronic "Waterboarding thrill ride" at Coney Island.

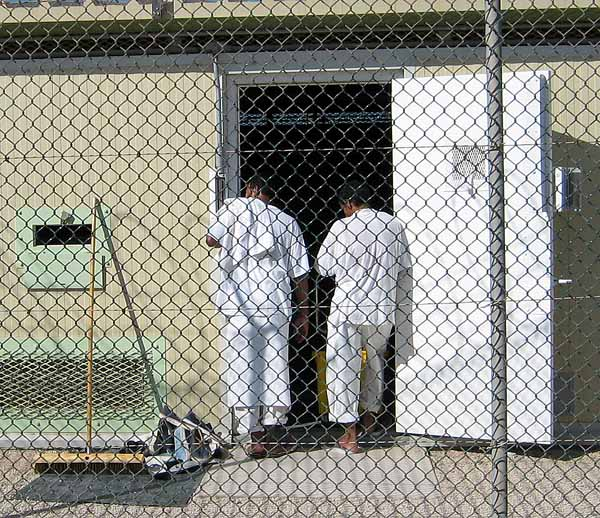
Two detainees in white "uniforms" stand in the doorway of their bay in Camp 4.

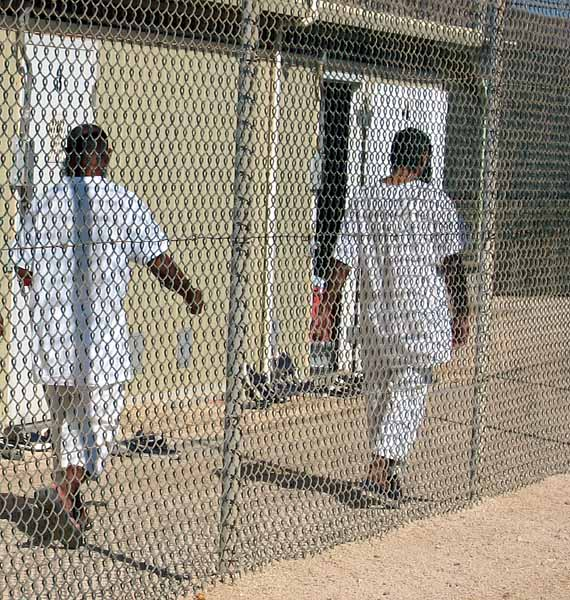
Detainees walk in an exercise yard in Camp 4.

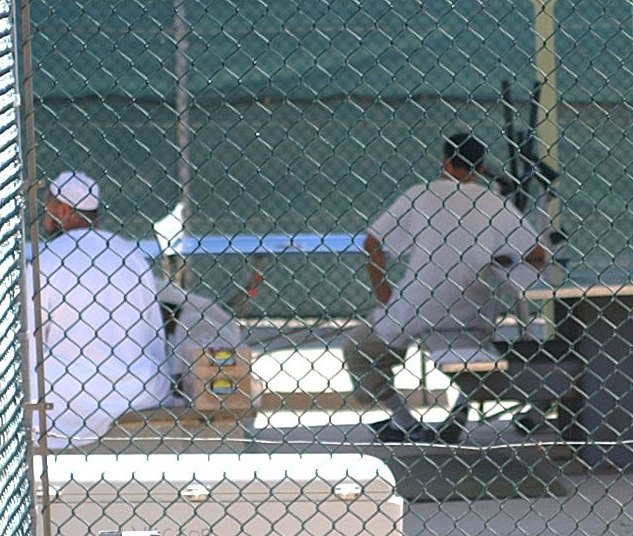
Detainees sit around the exercise yard in Camp 4, the medium security facility within Camp Delta at Naval Station Guantanamo Bay, Cuba.

== McClatchy report ==
On June 15, 2008, the McClatchy News Service published a package of articles about Guantanamo. In a profile of Zia Khalid Najib they quoted Abdul Jabar Sabit, Attorney General of Afghanistan. According to their report "...he was struck that detainees were classified into groups, marked in descending order from orange to white garb, by how well they behaved and not by whether they were suspected of terrorist or anti-American activities. ... This division did not have anything to do with the crimes attributed to them. Only their behavior in the prison was taken into account." According to the McClatchy package, some of the detainees with the most meaningful ties to terrorism had been released early, because they were compliant with the camp rules, while low-level or innocent men remained in detention because they had personality clashes with their guards.
