= Mark H. Buzby =

American admiral (born 1956)

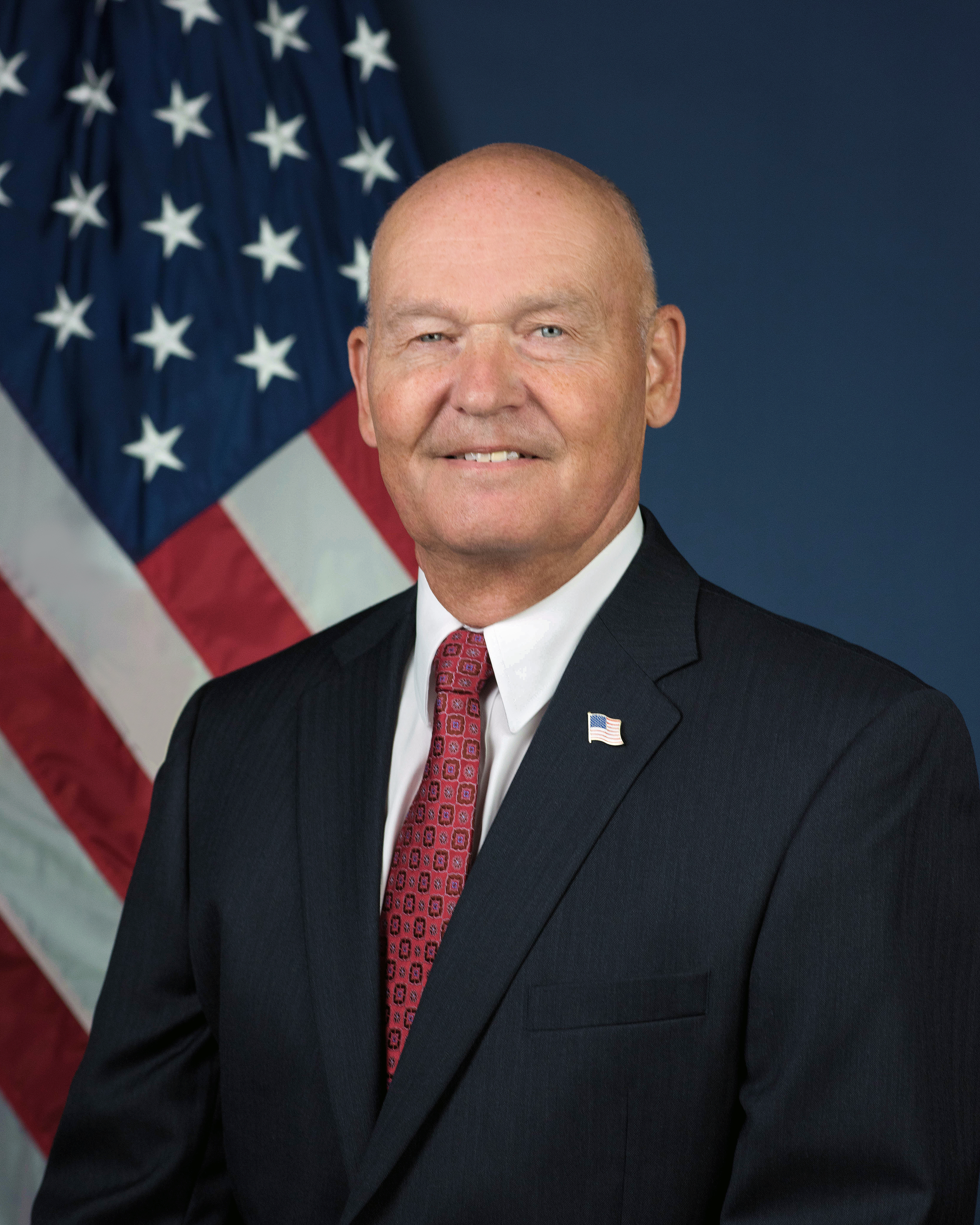
- Buzby in 2017

19th United States Maritime Administrator
- In office August 8, 2017 – January 11, 2021
- President: Donald Trump
- Preceded by: Chip Jaenichen
- Succeeded by: Ann C. Phillips

Personal details
- Born: Mark Howard Buzby; October 6, 1956 (age 69) Atlantic City, New Jersey, U.S.
- Education: United States Merchant Marine Academy (BS); Naval War College (MS); Salve Regina University (MA)

Military service
- Allegiance: United States
- Branch/service: United States Navy
- Years of service: 1979–2013
- Rank: Rear Admiral
- Commands: Deputy director, expeditionary warfare, N85B, Office of the Chief of Naval Operations Commander, Joint Task Force Guantanamo (2007-03-29 — 2008-01-11) Deputy Director, U.S. Fleet Forces Command (2008-01-11 — unknown) Commander, Military Sealift Command (2009-10-16 — 2013-05-10)

Mark Howard Buzby (born October 6, 1956) is a retired United States Navy rear admiral who served as the Administrator of the United States Maritime Administration. He retired from the Navy in 2013 and joined Carnival Cruise Line's Safety & Reliability Review Board. Buzby was nominated to be MARAD Administrator in June 2017 by President Donald Trump, and confirmed to the position by the United States Senate on August 3, 2017. He resigned from the post on January 11, 2021, along with Secretary of Transportation Elaine Chao, to protest the 2021 United States Capitol attack.

== Early life and education ==
Born in Atlantic City, New Jersey, Buzby grew up in nearby Linwood. Buzby graduated from Admiral Farragut Academy (North) in 1975. He is also a 1979 graduate of the United States Merchant Marine Academy, where he earned his Bachelor of Science degree in Nautical Science and his U.S. Coast Guard Third Mate License. He was commissioned in June 1979. He is also a graduate of the Joint Forces Staff College and holds master's degrees from the U.S. Naval War College and Salve Regina University in Strategic Studies and International Relations.

== Career ==
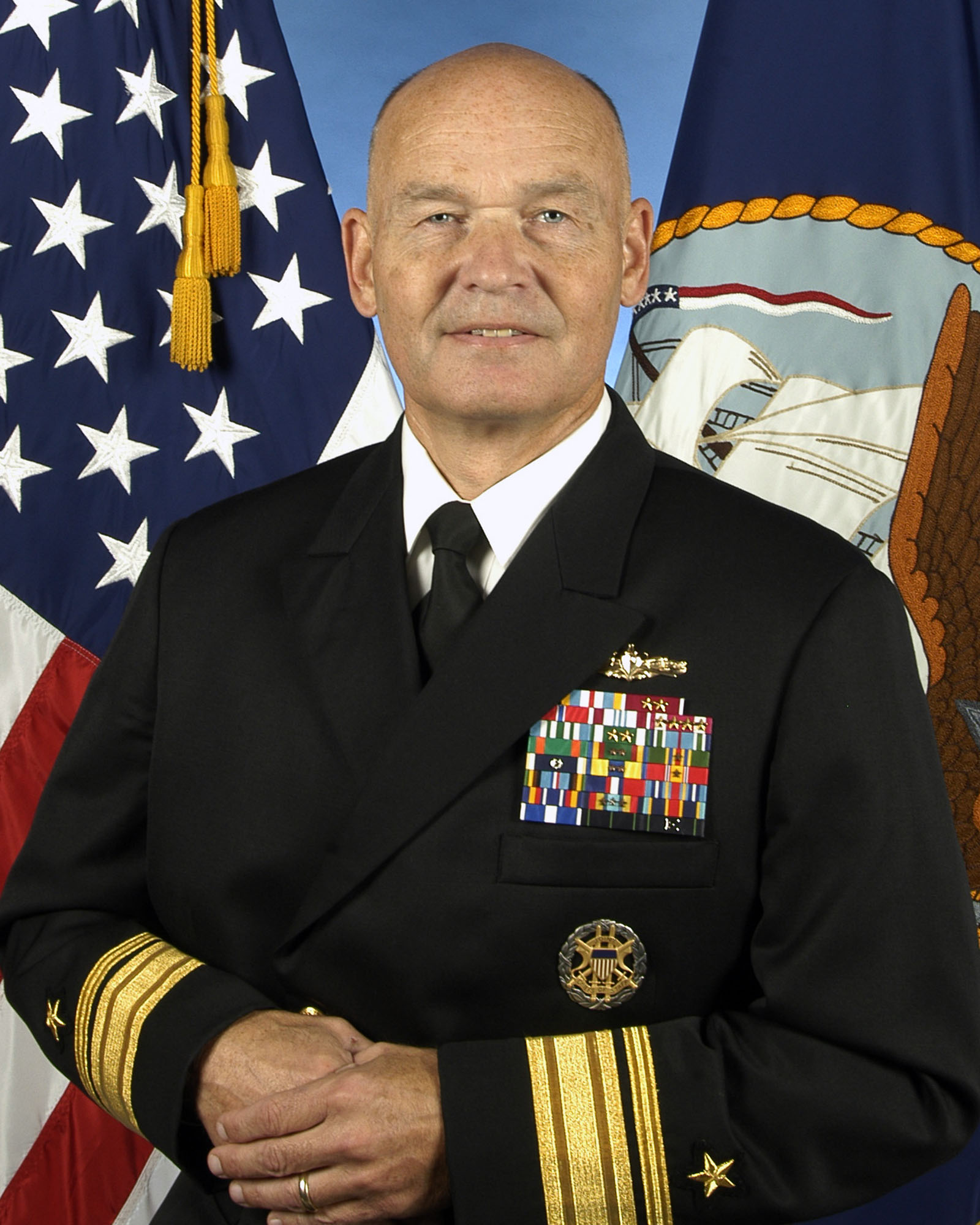
Official RADM photo

Buzby relieved Rear Admiral Robert D. Reilly Jr. as commander of the Military Sealift Command (MSC) on October 16, 2009, and served in the position for about 3.5 years. On May 10, 2013, Buzby was relieved by Rear Admiral (select) Thomas K. Shannon and retired after 34 years of service.

As a surface warfare officer, Buzby made deployments aboard various cruisers and destroyers, including USS Connole, USS Aries, USS Yorktown, and USS Shiloh. Buzby commanded the destroyer USS Carney through the ship's first Mediterranean-Persian Gulf deployment.

After this tour, Buzby returned to sea as United States Sixth Fleet assistant operations officer, and participated in combat operations as part of NATO’s Operation Allied Force in Kosovo. He then assumed command of Destroyer Squadron 31 as the sea combat commander for the Abraham Lincoln Battle Group during a deployment for Operation Southern Watch in Iraq and another for Enduring Freedom in Afghanistan.

Ashore, Buzby served on the Navy staff as the Point Defense Anti-Air Warfare section head for Surface Warfare Division and as Aegis Combat System development officer. An early joint experience was on the Joint Staff, Joint Operations Division as an operations officer and chairman's briefer. He was the 16th commanding officer of Surface Warfare Officers School.

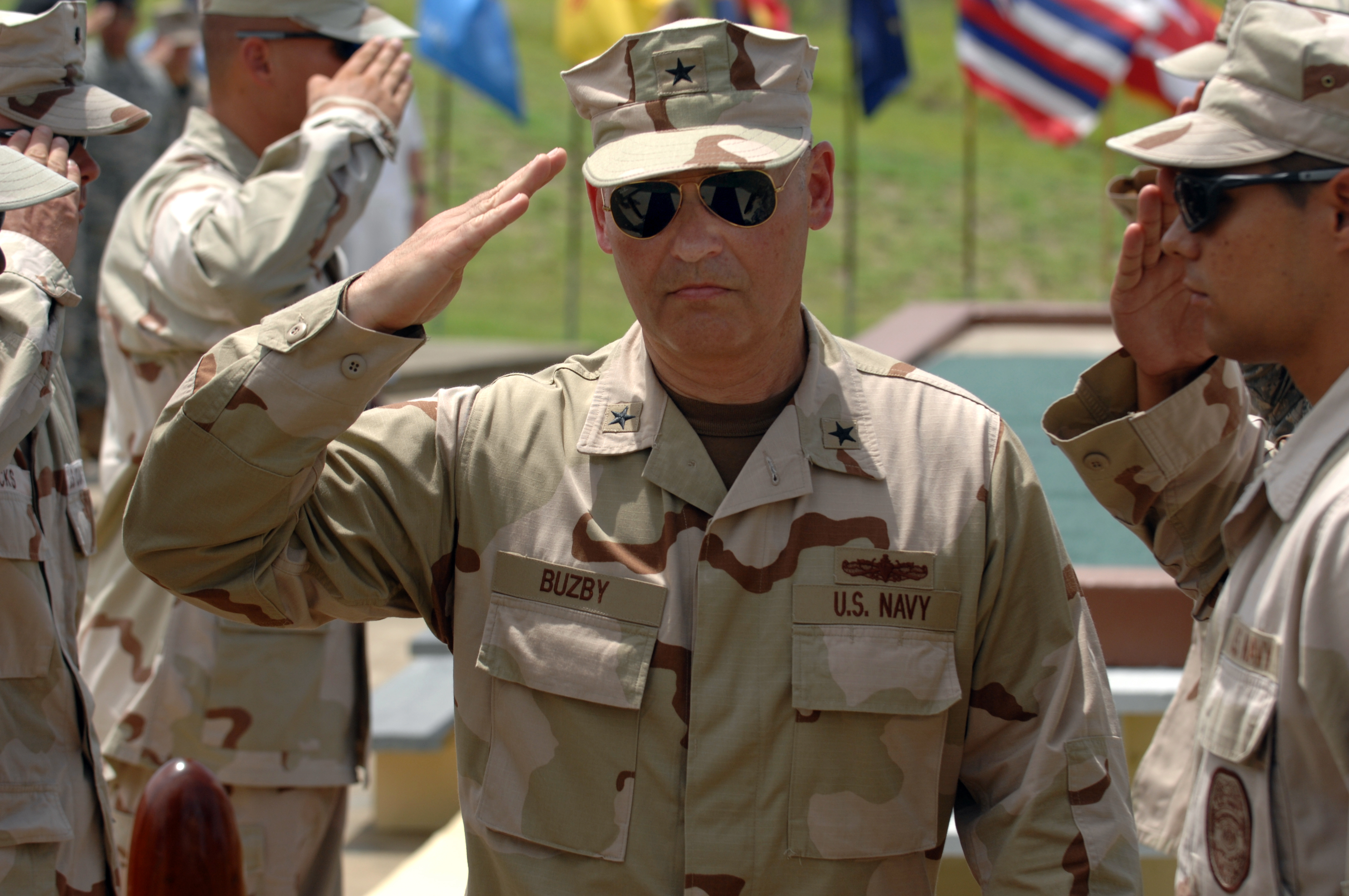
Buzby taking command of JTF-GTMO in May 2007.

Buzby took command of Joint Task Force Guantanamo in May 2007 and was relieved by Admiral David M. Thomas Jr. in 2008.

As a flag officer, Buzby served on the Navy staff as deputy for surface ships, deputy for surface warfare and deputy for expeditionary warfare. He has also served as commander, Joint Task Force Guantanamo, and most recently as deputy chief of staff for Global Force Management and Joint Operations, United States Fleet Forces Command. Buzby served as the commander of the U.S. Navy's Military Sealift Command from October 2009 to March 2013.

Buzby's personal awards include the Defense Superior Service Medal, Legion of Merit (four awards), Bronze Star, Defense Meritorious Service Medal, Meritorious Service Medal (five awards) and various other unit and campaign awards.

== Awards and decorations ==
Surface Warfare Officer insignia

Navy Distinguished Service Medal (awarded at MSC change of command ceremony)
Defense Superior Service Medal
Legion of Merit with two award stars
Bronze Star
Defense Meritorious Service Medal
Meritorious Service Medal with four award stars
Joint Service Commendation Medal
Navy and Marine Corps Commendation Medal with two award stars
Joint Service Achievement Medal
Navy and Marine Corps Achievement Medal
Navy Unit Commendation Ribbon with two service stars
Navy Meritorious Unit Commendation Ribbon with a service star
Navy E Ribbon (four times awarded)
Navy Expeditionary Medal with two service stars
National Defense Service Medal with a service star
Armed Forces Expeditionary Medal
Kosovo Campaign Medal
Global War on Terrorism Expeditionary Medal
Global War on Terrorism Service Medal
Navy Sea Service Deployment Ribbon with seven service stars
Navy Overseas Service Ribbon
NATO Medal for Kosovo
Navy Rifle Marksmanship Ribbon
Navy Expert Pistol Shot Medal
