= Vatikiotis =

Vatikiotis (Greek: Βατικιώτης) is a Greek surname. Notable people with the surname include:

- Michael Vatikiotis (born 1957) American writer,
- P. J. Vatikiotis (1928–1997), Greek-American political scientist
- Tasos Georgiou Vatikiotis (born 1977), American soccer player
