= Nasserist Socialist Vanguard Party =

- Leader: Mowaffaq al-Ani
- Legalised: 2003
- Preceded by: Iraqi Arab Socialist Union
- Ideology: Nasserism; Arab socialism Iraqi nationalism Arab nationalism Socialism; Secularism; Nonsectarianism; Historical, now faction: Assadism; Anti-Saddamism
- Political position: Left-wing
- Colors: Red white Black
- Slogan: Freedom, Socialism, Unity. حرية، اشتراكية، وحدة

Party flag

The Nasserist Socialist Vanguard Party (Arabic: الحزب الطليعي الاشتراكي الناصري) is a Nasserist political party in Iraq. It is led by Mowaffaq al-Ani. It adheres to Nasserist ideology, based on the legacy of Egyptian President Gamal Abdel Nasser, promoting Arab unity, secularism, anti-imperialism, and Arab socialism.

The NSVP has not been involved in violence, corruption, or sectarian rhetoric and remains a marginal political force despite its controversial calls for military-led transitional rule. Although sometimes labeled a Sunni party due to its leadership's Iraqi Sunni Arab background and support base, the NSVP explicitly rejects sectarianism and positions itself as a secular, Pan-Arab Iraqi nationalist alternative to sectarian and Islamist groups.

== History ==
NSVP leaders were active in opposition circles against Saddam Hussein. Dr. Abdul Sattar al-Jumaili, a veteran Iraqi Nasserist intellectual, represented the NSVP at a 2002 London Iraqi opposition conference. He was later quoted as telling U.S. envoy Zalmay Khalilzad that he represented a Nasserist party, which would become the Nasserist Socialist Vanguard Party. The party rejected any sectarian classification of Iraqi factions and refused to join the post-Saddam "five-man committee" that was organized along ethnic/sectarian lines.

After the 2003 U.S. invasion, the NSVP became a legal party in Iraq’s new political system. It remained very minor electorally. In the December 2005 national elections it campaigned as part of the “National Salvation Front” (Jabhat al-Khalāṣ al-Waṭanī) coalition, which included a few small secular and tribal lists.

== Ideology ==
The NSVP is explicitly Nasserist and Arab nationalist. Its stated platform emphasizes the legacy of Gamal Abdel Nasser: Arab unity, secular anti-imperialism, social justice and state-led development. Key ideological points include:

Arab Unity and Secular Nationalism: The party insists that Iraq is fundamentally an Arab nation state and that Arab unity is an integral part of its identity. A 2009 party statement declared Nasserism a continuous revolution and reaffirmed “the great goals of our Arab nation in freedom, socialism and unity”. It calls for strengthening Iraq’s ties with other Arab states and resisting foreign interference in the region.

Socialism and Justice: The NSVP identifies as a socialist party in the Nasserist tradition. It calls for state-led development, redistribution of wealth, nationalization of key resources, and strong public investment in housing, education, and healthcare. Its vision is framed in terms of social justice and national dignity, echoing historical Nasserist slogans. In its public statements, the party emphasizes the need to build what it terms an “Arab state of unity and political and social justice.”

Anti-Imperialism and Sovereignty: The party is strongly anti-occupation. It denounced U.S. presence in Iraq, for example, a 2008 NSVP communiqué condemned the U.S.–Iraq Status of Forces Agreement as a continuation of foreign occupation and a “collective sin” against the Iraqi people.

Anti-Sectarianism: While the NSVP is sometimes listed as a Sunni political party in Western policy analyses due to the Sunni background of its leadership and supporters, the party itself strongly rejects sectarian identity or ethnic division in Iraqi politics. The party views sectarian and ethnic quotas as the primary cause of Iraq’s political paralysis, social division, and institutional collapse. Since the early 2000s, it has refused to participate in political coalitions organized around sectarian identities, advocating instead for a unified Iraqi identity rooted in Arab nationalism.

Governance Reforms: The NSVP calls for sweeping reforms to Iraq’s political system, firmly opposing the post-2003 federal framework, which it views as a source of division and fragmentation. In 2022, the party explicitly demanded a new constitution that would abolish federalism, describing it as “a weapon in the hands of separatist sects and ethnicities.” In its place, the NSVP proposed establishing a unitary state with administrative decentralization, governed by a semi-presidential system and backed by a strong centralized national military.

== See also ==
- Arab Socialist Union (Iraq)
- Arab Struggle Party
