= Herndon, Virginia =

Herndon
- Town
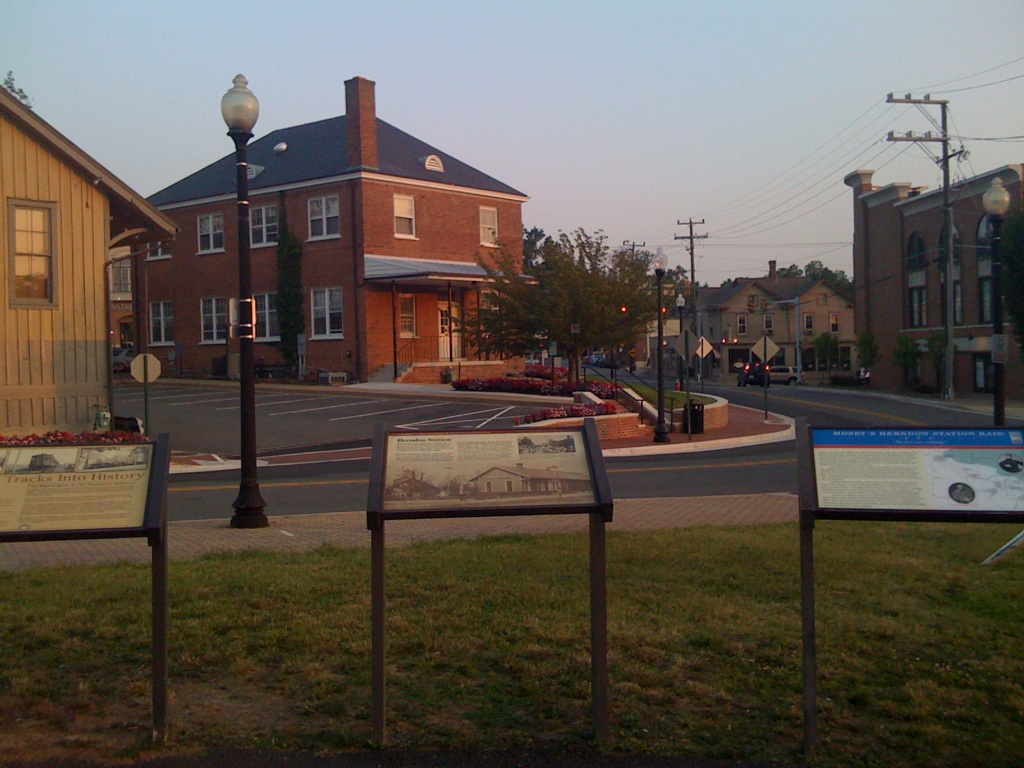
- Central Herndon

- Seal

- Location within Fairfax county

- Location within Northern Virginia Location within Virginia Location within the United States
- Coordinates: 38°58′17″N 77°23′19″W
- Country: United States
- State: Virginia
- County: Fairfax
- Established: 1858

Government
  - Mayor: Keven LeBlanc Jr.

Area
  - Total: 4.29 sq mi (11.12 km^{2})
  - Land: 4.29 sq mi (11.10 km^{2})
  - Water: 0.0077 sq mi (0.02 km^{2})
- Elevation: 361 ft (110 m)

Population (2020)
  - Total: 24,655
  - Density: 5,753/sq mi (2,221.2/km^{2})
- Time zone: UTC−5 (Eastern (EST))
  - Summer (DST): UTC−4 (EDT)
- ZIP code: 20170
- Area codes: 703, 571
- FIPS code: 51-36648
- GNIS feature ID: 1495675
- Website: http://www.herndon-va.gov

Herndon is a town in Fairfax County, Virginia, United States. Located in Northern Virginia, it is part of the Washington, D.C. metropolitan area. In 2020, the population at the census was 24,655, which makes it the largest of three incorporated towns in the county.

== History ==
The early settlement was named Herndon in 1858, after Commander William Lewis Herndon, an American naval explorer and author of Exploration of the Valley of the Amazon. Commander Herndon captained the ill-fated steamer SS Central America, going down with his ship while helping to save over 150 of its passengers and crew. In the 1870s, many Northern soldiers and their families came to settle in the area, taking advantage of moderate climate and low land prices.

Originally part of the rural surroundings of the Washington, D.C. area, the town of Herndon developed into a hub of dairy farming and vacationing for area residents, aided by its presence along the Alexandria, Loudoun and Hampshire Railroad, later renamed the Washington and Old Dominion (W&OD) Railroad. When the railroad was converted into a hike-and-bike trail, Herndon capitalized on history and small-town feel (in a major metropolitan region) by converting its train station into a museum and visitors center and by relocating a Norfolk Southern Railway caboose to a nearby site and repainting it in W&OD livery.

The caboose was originally acquired in 1989 by Herndon Historical Society member, George Moore, to whose memory the caboose was dedicated after his death in 2003. Although the caboose itself never traveled through Herndon, it remains an iconic part of the downtown area that both locals and tourists visit daily. The caboose and station offer a glimpse of the original downtown's historic charm, which residents are passionate about preserving.

On January 14, 2004, the Town of Herndon commemorated its 125th anniversary.

The town of Herndon was part of a nationally reported controversy involving illegal immigration beginning in 2005. The controversy revolved around a day labor center called the Herndon Official Worker Center (HOW Center), operated by Reston Interfaith's Project Hope and Harmony under a grant from surrounding Fairfax County. The HOW Center was created on March 23, 2006, in response to daily gatherings of Hispanic workers at a local 7-Eleven store. The 2006 election for Mayor and Town Council revolved mainly around the issue, and resulted in unseating the pro-center Mayor and two councilmembers. The center closed after less than two years of operation, in September 2007.

The Herndon Historic District is listed on the National Register of Historic Places.

== Geography ==
Herndon is located at 38°58′17″N 77°23′19″W (38.971478, −77.388675).

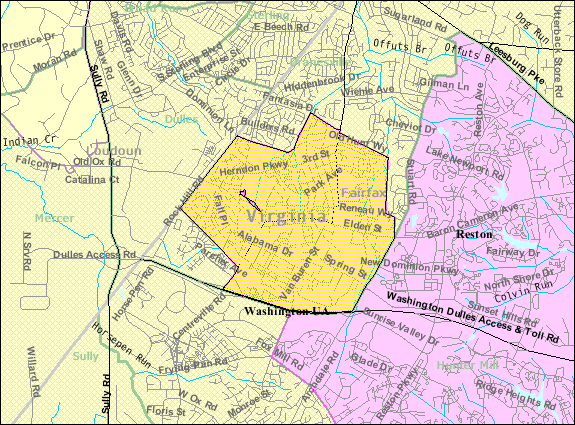
Boundaries of Herndon as of 2000 (U.S. Census Bureau)

According to the United States Census Bureau, the town has a total area of 4.2 square miles (10.9 km^{2}), all of it land. Just over two acres of land in the town are technically in Loudoun County.

== Demographics ==
Historical population
Census	Pop.	Note	%±
1880	422		—
1890	795		88.4%
1900	692		−13.0%
1910	802		15.9%
1920	953		18.8%
1930	887		−6.9%
1940	1,046		17.9%
1950	1,461		39.7%
1960	1,960		34.2%
1970	4,301		119.4%
1980	11,449		166.2%
1990	16,139		41.0%
2000	21,655		34.2%
2010	23,292		7.6%
2020	24,655		5.9%
U.S. Decennial Census

=== Racial and ethnic composition ===
Herndon, Virginia – Racial and ethnic composition Note: the US Census treats Hispanic/Latino as an ethnic category. This table excludes Latinos from the racial categories and assigns them to a separate category. Hispanics/Latinos may be of any race.
Race / Ethnicity (NH = Non-Hispanic)	Pop 1980	Pop 2000	Pop 2010	Pop 2020	% 1980	% 2000	% 2010	% 2020
White alone (NH)	9,637	10,171	8,429	8,025	84.17%	46.97%	36.19%	32.55%
Black or African American alone (NH)	1,022	2,000	2,141	2,019	8.93%	9.24%	9.19%	8.19%
Native American or Alaska Native alone (NH)	21 (Note: Includes all people who gave "American Indian", "Eskimo", or "Aleut" as their race, regardless of Hispanic identity.)	64	50	43	0.18%	0.3%	0.21%	0.17%
Asian alone (NH)	339 (Note: Includes all people who gave "Japanese", "Chinese", "Filipino", "Korean", "Asian Indian", or "Vietnamese" as their race, regardless of Hispanic identity.)	2,992	4,159	4,320	2.96%	13.82%	17.86%	17.52%
Native Hawaiian or Pacific Islander alone (NH)	7 (Note: Includes all people who gave "Hawaiian", "Guamanian", or "Samoan" as their race, regardless of Hispanic identity.)	8	3	5	0.06%	0.04%	0.01%	0.02%
Other race alone (NH)	x	81	53	158	x	0.37%	0.23%	0.64%
Mixed race or Multiracial (NH)	x	706	631	838	x	3.26%	2.71%	3.4%
Hispanic or Latino (any race)	319	5,633	7,826	9,247	2.79%	26.01%	33.6%	37.51%
Total	11,449	21,655	23,292	24,655	100.00%	100.00%	100.00%	100.00%

=== 2020 census ===
As of the 2020 census, Herndon had a population of 24,655. The median age was 35.1 years. 24.8% of residents were under the age of 18 and 10.0% of residents were 65 years of age or older. For every 100 females there were 107.4 males, and for every 100 females age 18 and over there were 105.8 males age 18 and over.

100.0% of residents lived in urban areas, while 0.0% lived in rural areas.

There were 7,900 households in Herndon, of which 39.6% had children under the age of 18 living in them. Of all households, 53.6% were married-couple households, 18.4% were households with a male householder and no spouse or partner present, and 21.4% were households with a female householder and no spouse or partner present. About 20.4% of all households were made up of individuals and 5.9% had someone living alone who was 65 years of age or older.

There were 8,133 housing units, of which 2.9% were vacant. The homeowner vacancy rate was 0.6% and the rental vacancy rate was 4.0%.

=== Demographic estimates ===
(Some information from the 2022 American Community Survey)

The average family household had 3.53 people. The largest ancestry is the 8.6% who had German ancestry, 53.7% spoke a language other than English at home, and 41.8% were born outside the United States, 44.9% of whom were naturalized citizens.

=== Income and poverty ===
The median income for a household in the town was $133,403, and the median income for a family was $155,901. 5.0% of the population were military veterans, and 52.5% had a bachelor's degree or higher. In the town 7.1% of the population was below the poverty line, including 11.3% of those under the age of 18 and 9.3% of those aged 65 or over, with 16.2% of the population without health insurance.

=== 2010 census ===
As of the 2010 census, there were 23,292 people, 7,472 households, and 5,357 families residing in the town. The population density was 5,129.9 inhabitants per square mile (1,980.7/km^{2}). There were 7,190 housing units at an average density of 1,703.3 per square mile (657.6/km^{2}). The racial makeup of the town was 50.7% White, 9.5% Black, 0.7% Native American, 17.9% Asian (8.5% Indian, 1.6% Vietnamese, 1.5% Chinese, 1.2% Filipino, 0.7% Korean, 0.1% Japanese, 4.2% Other Asian), 0.0% Pacific Islander, 16.0% from other races, and 5.2% from two or more races. Hispanic or Latino of any race were 33.6% of the population.

There were 6,962 households, of which 41.7% had children under the age of 18 living with them, 56.8% were married couples living together, 9.4% had a female householder with no husband present, and 28.6% were non-families. 20.6% of all households were made up of individuals, and 2.8% had someone living alone who was 65 years of age or older. The average household size was 3.11 and the average family size was 3.54.

In the town, the population was spread out, with 27.1% under the age of 18, 10.2% from 18 to 24, 38.3% from 25 to 44, 20.5% from 45 to 64, and 3.9% who were 65 years of age or older. The median age was 32 years. For every 100 females, there were 111.4 males. For every 100 females aged 18 and over, there were 111.0 males.

The median income for a household in the town was $72,912, and the median income for a family was $79,140 (these figures had risen to $92,947 and $108,446 respectively as of a 2007 estimate). Males had a median income of $44,197 versus $35,548 for females. The per capita income for the town was $26,941. About 4.7% of families and 8.1% of the population were below the poverty line, including 9.1% of those under age 18 and 5.5% of those age 65 or over.

== Economy ==
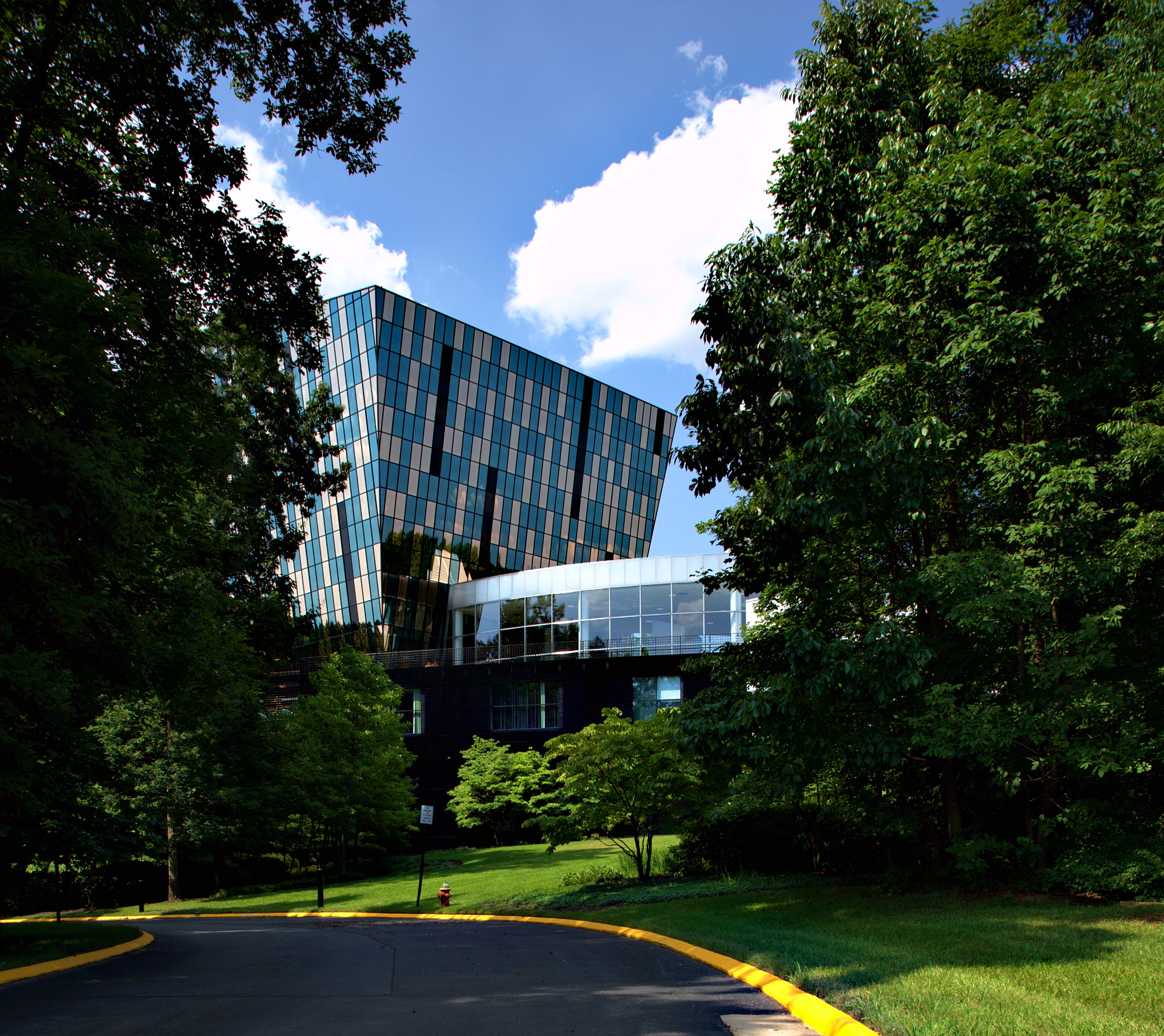
The Center for Innovative Technology building, between Herndon and Dulles airport

Herndon is part of the Dulles Technology Corridor, which Fortune magazine named the "Netplex" because of the presence of the headquarters of such companies as AOL, XO Communications, Stride, Inc., Verizon Business (formerly MCI, formerly WorldCom, originally UUNET), and Network Solutions, which began as the InterNIC – the registry where every domain name was once administered.

Some of those companies are within Herndon. Others have Herndon mailing addresses but are located in unincorporated Fairfax or Loudoun counties; for example, south of the Dulles Toll Road. These include Deltek and Stride.

=== Top employers ===
According to the Town's 2025 Annual Comprehensive Financial Report, the principal employers in the Town are:

#	Employer	# of Employees
1	Serco	500-749
2	Amazon Web Services	250-499
3	Karsun Solutions	250-499
4	Northwest Federal Credit Union	250-499
5	Peraton	250-499
6	Boeing Corporation	250-499
7	Town of Herndon	100-249
8	Smartronix Inc	100-249
9	Everfox Holdings LLC	100-249
10	Allwyn Corporation	100-249

Prior year's ACFRS are also available.

== Government ==
The town is organized as an incorporated town by the Commonwealth of Virginia, and is governed by an elected Mayor and Town Council who serve on a part-time basis. Update on Town of Herndon, Virginia.

The current mayor is Keven J. LeBlanc, Jr., who was first elected to Council in 2023. The Mayor chairs the Council and heads the executive branch of the town government. The Police Department, independent of the county police department, is headed by Chief Steven Pihonak, and consists of 56 sworn officers. The Herndon Police Department achieved national recognition on November 8, 1986, by becoming the seventh police agency in Virginia and the 42nd police agency in the United States to be accredited by the Commission on Accreditation for Law Enforcement Agencies.

== Attractions ==
Herndon boasts a wide variety of diversions and celebrations year-round. Among the community events are:

May	Friday Night Live! (free concerts May–August), Farmers' Market (May–October), Towne Square Singers, Big Truck Days, Public Works Forest and Meadow Wildflower Walk
July	Fourth of July celebrations and fireworks
September	Labor Day Jazz Festival, Annual Motorcycle Poker Run (Fraternal Order of Police), Annual NatureFest Celebration, HerndonHalf Marathon, 12k, and 5k

Herndon contains the Herndon Depot Museum, the site of "Mosby's Raid on Herndon Station", which was a Civil War skirmish that took place on St. Patrick's Day, 1863. Also within the town is The Herndon Centennial Golf Course, the Herndon ArtSpace (a community art gallery), community center with basketball and racquetball courts and multiple baseball fields, and an aquatic center. Adjacent to the community center is Bready Park, with indoor tennis courts. Additionally, every residence within the town borders is within a mile or less of a public park. Herndon is home to a professional live theatre, NextStop Theatre, which produces a variety of plays, musicals, concerts, and educational theatre programming each season.

== Education ==
=== Primary and secondary schools ===
Herndon is within the Fairfax County Public Schools district.

Public schools serving students within the Herndon town limits are:

- Clearview Elementary School
- Dranesville Elementary School
- Herndon Elementary School
- Hutchison Elementary School
- Herndon Middle School
- Herndon High School

Private school options include: Dominion Christian School, St Joseph's Elementary and several Montessori schools.

Private schools south of Herndon, in nearby Floris:

- King Abdullah Academy
- Nysmith School (PK-8)

=== Public libraries ===
Fairfax County Public Library operates the Herndon Fortnightly Library in Herndon.

== Transportation ==
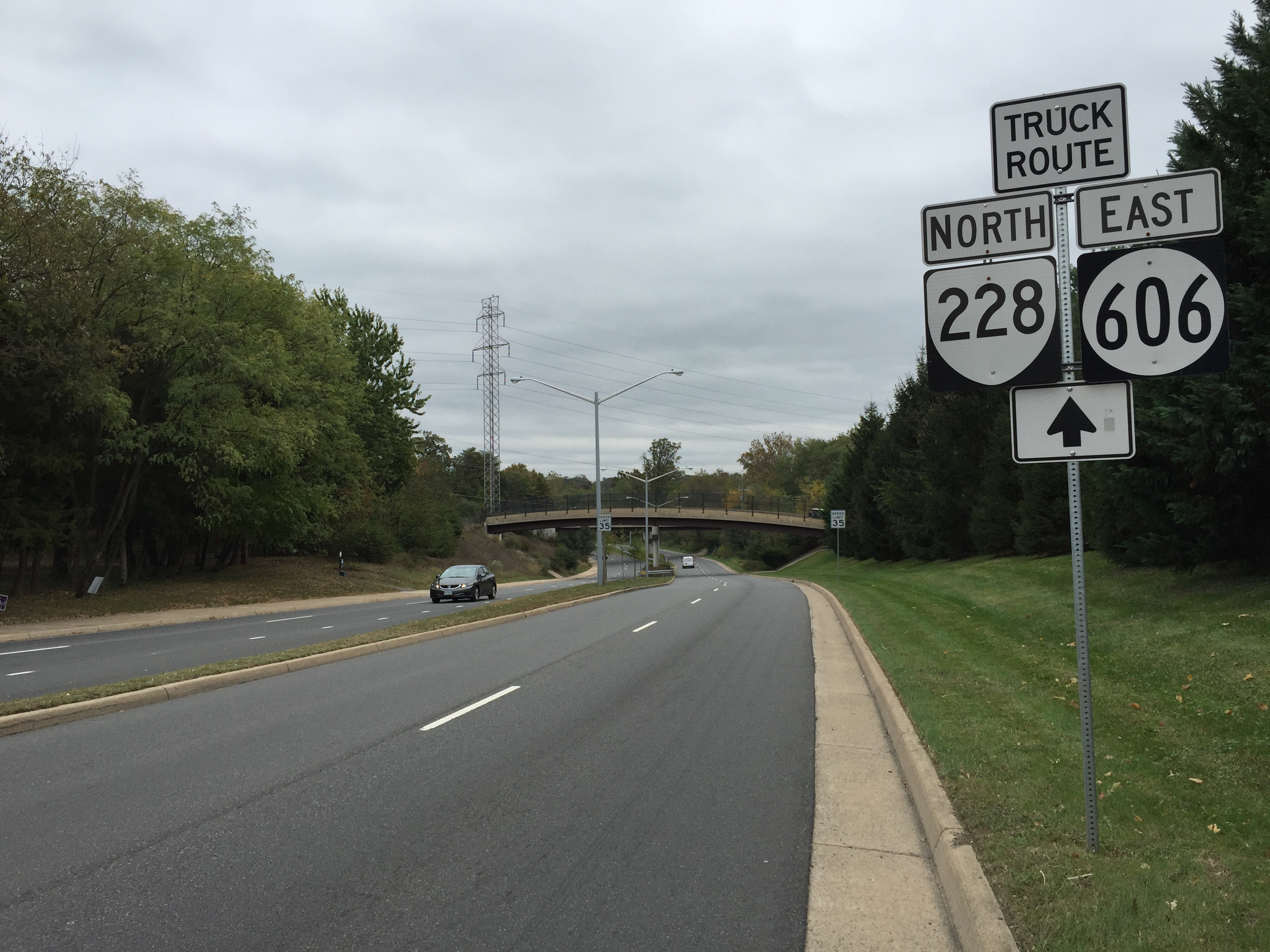
SR 228 Truck in Herndon

The primary highway serving Herndon is Virginia State Route 228 and its truck route. SR 228 heads directly through the center of town via Elden Street, Monroe Street, Park Avenue and Dranesville Road. SR 228 Truck diverges from Elden Street southwest of downtown on Herndon Parkway, following that road northwestward, northward and northeastward around central Herndon, finally reaching Dranesville Road north of downtown. At the south end of town, SR 228 meets Virginia State Route 267, a high speed, high-capacity toll road which provides access to Washington, D.C. (via Interstate 66) and Dulles International Airport. In 2022, the Silver Line's extension opened, providing service at Herndon station.

== Climate ==
The climate in this area is characterized by hot, humid summers and generally mild to cool winters. According to the Köppen Climate Classification system, Herndon has a humid subtropical climate, abbreviated "Cfa" on climate maps.

== Notable people ==
- Amaka Agugua-Hamilton, head women's basketball coach, University of Virginia
- Rod Beaton, sports journalist for USA Today
- Sabrina Bruce, military officer and political candidate
- Jon Carman, former professional American football player
- Jerome Cornfield, statistician
- Albert Scott Crossfield, American naval officer and test pilot
- Jay A. DeLoach, American naval officer
- Ronnie Dove, pop and country musician
- Wesley L. Fox, USMC Colonel Retired, Medal of Honor recipient, and former Deputy Commandant Virginia Tech Corps of Cadets
- Romain Gall, professional soccer player
- Angie Goff, broadcast journalist
- Brandon Guyer, professional American baseball player
- Kala, TikToker and hobby tunneler
- Joe Snively, professional Washington Capitals ice hockey player
- Ferenc Nagy, former Prime Minister of Hungary
- Štefan Osuský, Slovak politician and diplomat
- Sean Parker, founder of Napster and former president of Facebook
- Scottie Reynolds, former Villanova Wildcats basketball player
- Thomas Davis Rust, Virginia Delegate and former mayor of Herndon
- Brendan Shapiro, gym teacher and Survivor contestant
- Chris Smith, Congressman NJ District 4
- Tasos Georgiou Vatikiotis, former professional footballer

== Sister cities ==
Its sister city is Runnymede, Surrey, England, United Kingdom.

== See also ==
- Reston, Virginia
- Dulles International Airport
- Washington Metropolitan Area
