= Arab Socialist Union =

Arab Socialist Union

The Arab Socialist Union may refer to:

- Arab Socialist Union (Egypt), active 1962–78
- Arab Socialist Union (Iraq), active 1964–68
- Arab Socialist Union (Lebanon), founded in 1970
- Arab Socialist Union (Libya), active 1971−77
- Arab Socialist Union Party (Syria), founded in 1973
- Democratic Arab Socialist Union (Syria), founded in 1980

== See also ==
- Socialist Union (disambiguation)
- Unified Political Command, confederation proposals between Egypt and Iraq and Egypt and North Yemen
