= Arab Union =

Theoretical political union of Arab states

Map of the Arab world

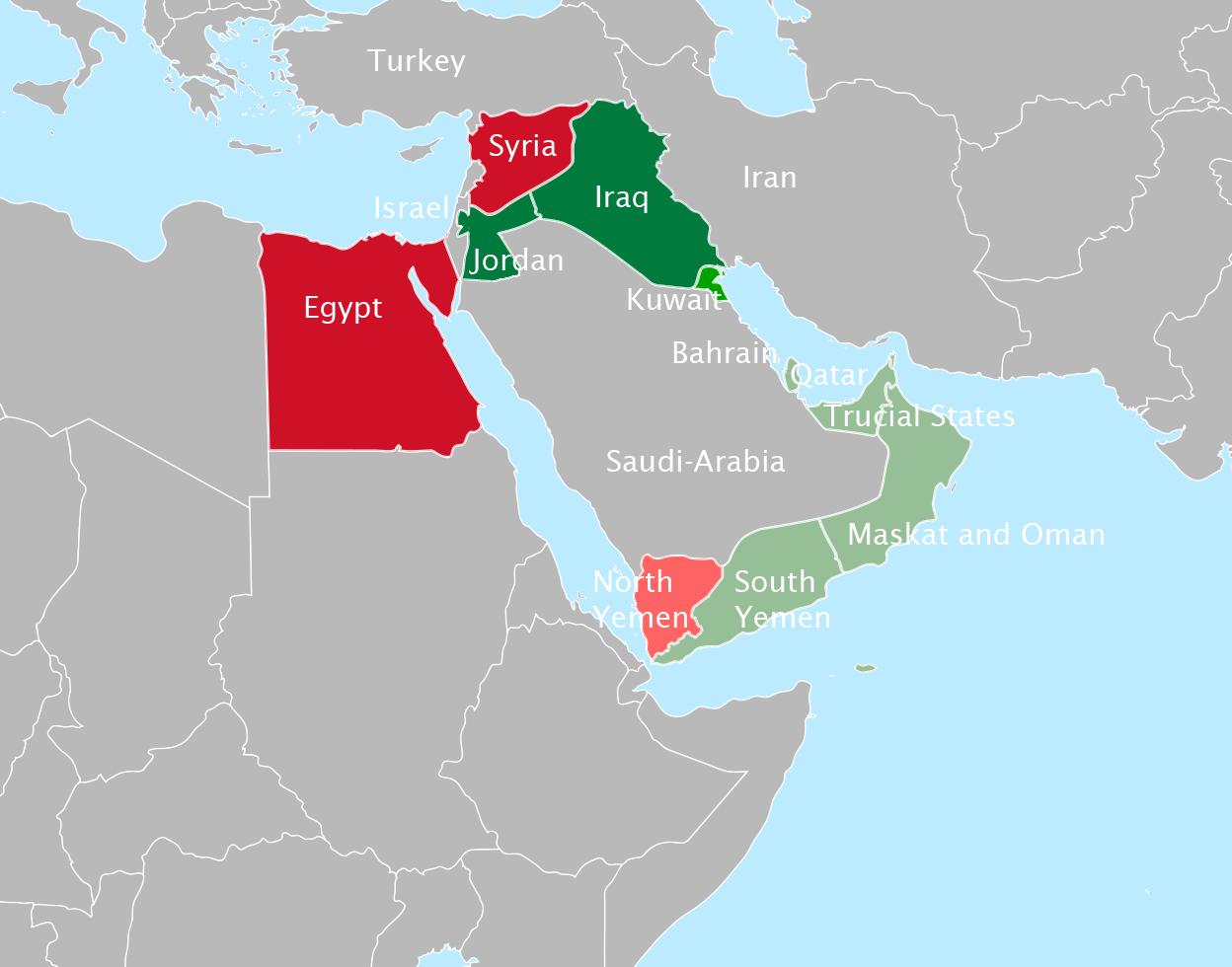
Middle East in 1958: United Arab Republic (red), United Arab States (red and light red), Arab Federation (green), British Kuwait (grass green), other British protectorates in the Persian Gulf (light green).

The Arab Union is a theoretical political union of the Arab states. The term was first used when the British Empire and French empire promised the Arabs a united independent state in return for revolting against the Ottoman Empire, with which the United Kingdom and France were at war. It never came to fruition following the Sykes–Picot Agreement. Despite this, many in the Arab world have since called for the creation of a pan-Arab state. Egyptian President Gamal Abdel Nasser made several unsuccessful attempts to unite Egypt with other Arab countries (including Iraq and North Yemen), and briefly succeeded in forming the United Arab Republic with Syria in 1958, which dissolved in 1971. The union is considered as one of the solutions to end the Israeli–Palestinian conflict.

Similar attempts were made by other Arab leaders, such as Hafez al-Assad, Ahmed Hassan al-Bakr, Faisal I of Iraq, Muammar Gaddafi, Saddam Hussein, Gaafar Nimeiry and Anwar Sadat.

== Proposals ==
In the 2004 Arab League summit in Cairo, Yemeni President Ali Abdullah Saleh proposed the creation of an Arab Union replacing the Arab League for a stronger political and geographical body, capable of dealing with world issues. However, the proposal failed to reach the League's agenda.

During the Arab Spring in 2011, Saudi Arabia raised a proposal to transform the Gulf Cooperation Council into a "Gulf Union" with tighter economic, political and military coordination, regarded as a move to counterbalance the Iranian influence in the region. Objections were raised against the proposal by other countries. In 2014, Bahrain Prime minister Khalifa bin Salman Al Khalifa said that current events in the region highlighted the importance of the proposal.

== Failed unifications ==
- Fertile Crescent Plan (1920s–1950s)
- Arab Federation (1958)
- United Arab Republic (1958–1961) (Note: The United Arab Republic effectively ended with Syrian withdrawal in 1961, but Egypt continued to use the name until 1971.)
- United Arab States (1958–1961)
- Unified Political Command (1964–1967)
- Federation of Arab Emirates (1968–1971)
- Federation of Arab Republics (1971–1977)
- Union of Arab Republics (1972)
- United Arab Kingdom (1972)
- Arab Islamic Republic (1974)

== Successful unifications ==
- Unification of Saudi Arabia (1902–1932)
- Foundation of the United Arab Emirates (1968–1972)
- Yemeni unification (1990)

== See also ==
- Arab League
- Arab nationalism
- List of proposed state mergers
- Middle East economic integration
- Pan-Arabism
- United States of Africa
- World government
