= Arab Republic =

Arab Republic may refer to:

== Current states ==
- Arab Republic of Egypt, commonly known as Egypt
- Syrian Arab Republic, commonly known as Syria

== Current states with limited recognition ==
- Sahrawi Arab Democratic Republic

== Former states ==
- United Arab Republic (1958–1971)
- Federation of Arab Republics (1972–1977)
- Libyan Arab Republic (1969–1977)
- Yemen Arab Republic (1962–1990)
- (Great) Socialist People's Libyan Arab Jamahiriya (1977–2011) (Note: The word "Jamahiriya" is derived from the Arab word for "republic" ("Jumhuriyah") and can be roughly translated to "state of the masses", "peopledom", "people's republic", or "commonwealth".)

== Proposed states ==
- Arab Islamic Republic (1974)
- Union of Arab Republics (1972)

== See also ==
- Islamic republic (disambiguation)
- United Arab Republic (disambiguation)
