= Islamic Republican =

Islamic Republican may refer to:

- Islamic Republican (newspaper), official Iranian newspaper
- Islamic Republican Party, political party in Iran

== See also ==
- Islamic republic (disambiguation)
