= United Arab Republic (disambiguation) =

United Arab Republic usually refers to

- the United Arab Republic, a Union formed by Egypt and Syria from 1958 to 1961
- the Arab Republic of Egypt, which alone continued to use the name UAR from 1961 to 1972, see Egypt

However, between 1961 and 1972 United Arab Republic was also the name of several Arab nationalist attempts to restore the old UAR, to establish a new UAR or to unite with the UAR (i.e. Egypt), for example

- the Tripartite Unity Talks (1963) between Egypt, Iraq and Syria which failed after ba'athist-nasserist clashes in Syria
- the Unified Political Command for a planned merger of Egypt and Iraq 1964-1966
- the Unified Political Command for a planned merger of Egypt and North Yemen 1964-1967
- the Union of Arab Republics which Iraq proposed in 1972 as a restored UAR with Egypt and Syria. (It failed because of the earlier creation of the Egypt-Libyan-Syrian Federation of Arab Republics.)
- the United Arab Republic which Egypt and Libya planned 1972 as a more substantial union within the Egypt-Libyan-Syrian Federation of Arab Republics.

== See also ==
- Arab Republic (disambiguation)
- United Arab Emirates
