= Nasserism =

Arab socialist and nationalist political ideology

Nasserism (Arabic: التَّيَّار النَّاصِرِيّ, romanized: at-Tayyār an-Nāṣiriyy) is an Arab nationalist and Arab socialist political ideology based on the thinking of Gamal Abdel Nasser, one of the two principal leaders of the Egyptian Revolution of 1952, and Egypt's second president. Spanning the domestic and international spheres, it combines elements of Arab socialism, republicanism, secularism, nationalism, anti-imperialism, developing world solidarity, Pan-Arabism, and international non-alignment. According to Mohamed Hassanein Heikal, Nasserism symbolised "the direction of liberation, socialist transformation, the people's control of their own resources, and the democracy of the peoples working forces." According to Willard Range's interpretation of Nasserism, Nasserism was assumed "to give the Arab spirit a new lease on life" that would one day "make Arabs self-confident". Showing that this ideology was not created for political reform, rather as liberation towards outside perspectives.

Many other Arab countries have adopted Nasserist forms of government during the 20th century, most being formed during the 1960s, including Algeria under the FLN, Iraq under the Arab Socialist Union, and the Libyan Arab Republic under Muammar Gaddafi. In Yemen, Nasserism was represented by the Nasserist Democratic Party, led by Yassin Abdoh Saeed Noman, who was its Secretary-General until his death in 2020. The Nasserist ideology is also similar in theory to the Ba'athist ideology which was also notably practiced under Saddam Hussein's Iraq from 1968–2003 and under the Assad family's Syria from 1963–2024.

== History ==
In the 1950s and 1960s, Nasserism was amongst the most potent political ideologies in the Arab world. This was especially true following the Suez Crisis of 1956 (known in Egypt as the Tripartite Aggression), the political outcome of which was seen as a validation of Nasserism and a tremendous defeat for Western imperial powers. Nasser having led the triumph in this crisis had made him "more than ever the hero of the Arab world". During the Cold War, its influence was also felt in other parts of Africa and the developing world, particularly with regard to anti-imperialism and non-alignment. Nasser had created the need to have a "national dignity" as the need grew more Nasserism began to grow into more of an ideological force. The scale of the Arab defeat in the Six-Day War of 1967 damaged the standing of Nasser and the ideology associated with him. The failure in 1967 had exposed many limits and flaws in Nasserism. Many of which were not outcomes of the war but rather had been hidden under the populated growth of Nasserism, "Almost two decades of Nasserist rule did not eradicate the eternal problem of Egyptian poverty and scarcity."Though it survived Nasser's death in 1970, certain important tenets of Nasserism were revised or abandoned totally by his successor Anwar Sadat during what he termed the Corrective Revolution and later his Infitah economic policies. Under the three decade rule of Sadat's successor Hosni Mubarak, most of the remaining Arab-socialist infrastructure of Egypt was replaced by neoliberal policies strongly at odds with Nasserist principles. In the international arena, Mubarak departed almost entirely from traditional Egyptian policy, becoming a steadfast ally of both the United States government and Israel, the latter still viewed by most Egyptians with enmity and distrust, derived largely from the five wars that Egypt fought against Israel between 1948 and 1973.

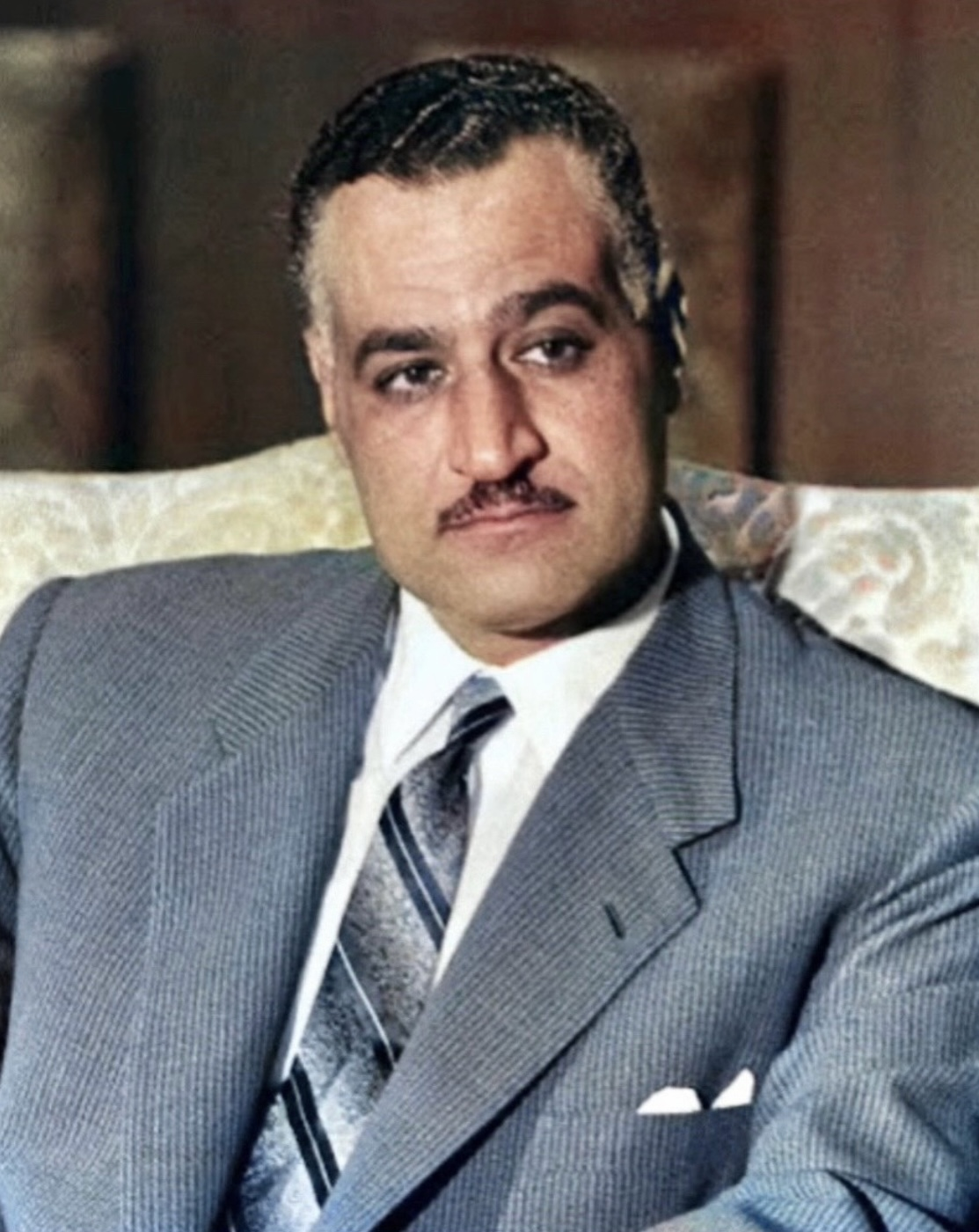
Gamal Abdel Nasser

During Nasser's lifetime, Nasserist groups were encouraged and often supported financially by Egypt to the extent that many became seen as willing agents of the Egyptian government in its efforts to spread revolutionary nationalism in the Arab world. In doing so, many began seeing pride restored in Egyptians, increase status in Arabs worldwide, and the "mobilization of masses in the political process as participants"

In Nasserism Revitalized (2007) Riexinger discusses how even after Nassers death Nasserism and the foundation it was built on had lasted. Riexinger describes how movements such as Islamic Left of Hasan Hanafi coincided with Nasserism. Built on the same foundation of anti-imperialism and tied with cultural and religious roots.

In the 1970s, as a younger generation of Arab revolutionaries came to the fore Nasserism outside Egypt metamorphosed into other Arab nationalist and pan-Arabist movements, including component groups of the Lebanese National Movement during the Lebanese Civil War. The main Nasserite movements that continued to be active until today on the Lebanese scene are mainly represented by the organization in Sidon of populist Nasserist partisans (at-Tanzim ash-Sha'bi an-Nassiri) that are led by Oussama Saad and in Beirut as represented mainly by the Al-Mourabitoun movement. Both groups have been mainly active since the early 1950s among Arabs and they are currently associated politically with the March 8 coalitions in Lebanese politics.

Nasserism continues to have significant resonance throughout the Arab world, and informs much of the public dialogue on politics in Egypt and the wider region. Prominent Nasserist Hamdeen Sabahi competed in the first round of the 2012 Egyptian presidential election and only narrowly missed out on a position in the run-off against eventual winner Mohamed Morsi. He later competed in the 2014 presidential election as one of only two candidates in a run-off, but lost to the other candidate, Abdel Fattah el-Sisi, in a significant landslide victory for the latter. In Nasserism and the impossibility of innocence 2021 by Zeyad el Nabolsy, Nabolsy explains that this persistence seen in the elections is a sign that Nasserism has succeeded in transforming into a political ideology. Decades after Nasser's death there are still signs of Nasserism active as a political party in Middle Eastern Countries.

== Interpretations ==
"Nasserism", the broad term used in literature to describe the aspects of Nasser's rule and his legacy, can be interpreted in many ways. P. J. Vatikiotis in his book Nasser and his Generation (1978) argues that Nasserism had the limited political connotation of a phenomenon of "personal charismatic leadership, not to a movement or ideology". Vatikiotis elaborates upon Nasser's use of speech as a political tool to sway his constituents despite their deprivation of any participation in their leader's policies. To this end, Nasser frequently addressed masses on both radio and television as well as in huge rallies, with a "repeated hypnotic incantation of "imperialism" and "agents of imperialism", "reactionaries", "revenge", "dignity and self-respect", "Zionism" and "Arabism". Crowds were galvanized to hysteria as Nasser excited them with hopes and aspirations of strong leadership and Arab unity.

Nasserism, along with a similar Latin American ideology of Juan Perón, Peronism, was also interpreted as fascism. This was disputed by the political scientist John H. Kautsky, who argued that while Peronism and Nasserism have often been called fascist, this term is unsuitable given their significant differences from European fascism and Nazism. Kautsky notes that while fascism "was a movement of the propertied but impoverished and frustrated lower middle class, directed against labor and liberal intellcctuals, with the support of the traditional land-owning aristocracy and capitalists in banking and heavy industry", Nasserism and Peronism pursued "industrialization, basing their power on the support of labor and peasants, and turning against the traditional aristocracy and often the capitalists".

To put it in retrospect, in Nasser and Nasserism 1973 Peter Mansfield emphasizes on the "personal charismatic leadership" that Vatikiotis also mentions, emphasizing an understanding that Nasserism had become an extension of Nasser himself. Fouad Ajami in On Nasser and His Legacy 1974, writes that Nasserism is not seen as a structured ideology but rather more as a symbol of Arab political uprising and strength. Ajami interprets it as, "Nasserism may ultimately be purely psychological and symbolic..."

In Rethinking Nasserism (2004), Podeh and Winckler discuss another interpretation of Nasserism. According to them, "Western social scientists in the 1950s and 1960s, perceived Nasserism as a modernization movement and Nasser as a modernizing leader...Egypt was seen as a typical Third World country undergoing a process of decolonization and, under new revolutionary leadership, aspiring to national prosperity through modernization. Thus, Nasserism was perceived as an attempt to transform Egyptian traditional society through the modernization of its economy and society".

Yet another insight into Nasserism is provided in Political Trends in the Fertile Crescent (1958) by Walid Khalidi, who discusses it as not an ideological movement, rather an "attitude of mind" that is "eclectic, empirical, radical, and yet conservative". According to Walidi, Nasserism was able to attract support in the Arab world because it "transferred, if only partially, to the Arab world itself, the center of decisions concerning the future of that world". Khalidi asserts that this change inspired self-confidence in the Arab community. In A History of the Modern Middle East (2018), the author also talks about how Nasserism inspired self-confidence in the Arab community. The author states, "Egypt had gained a measure of independence and pride that at that time seemed enviable and worthy of emulation."

== Ideology ==
Nasserism is an Arab nationalist and pan-Arabist ideology, combined with a vaguely defined socialism, often distinguished from Eastern Bloc or Western thought by the label "Arab socialism". According to Idriss Jebari, Nasserist Arab socialism was pragmatic and based on Yugoslav socialism. Nasserist policies included nationalization of key economic sectors, basing the economy on economic planning, and commitment to social reform through seizing the properties of large landowners, as well as establishing an all-encompassing welfare model that included education, workplace and social life provisions. Nasserist socialism differs from Marxism in maintaining a degree of private property and opposing Marxist rejection of religion. Jebari notes that in contrast to Egyptian Marxists, Nasserism "was able to communicate its principles across the Arab masses" and "secured the support of students, peasants, workers, and the middle class".

Socialism is the primary element of Nasserism. Inmaculada Szmolka described Nasserism as "based on socialism, nationalism, and secularism". Francesc Serra regarded it as a "significant non-communist socialist nationalist" movement along with Ba'athism. Especially after becoming an ally of the Soviet Union, Nasserism came to be seen as "a particular brand of Middle Eastern socialism". Nasser also came to be supported by foreign communists, such as the Iraqi Communist Party, which praised for embarking on a "non-capitalist path". Nasserism is a core representative of African socialism, as both ideologies shared strategy of geopolitical neo-alignment, adapting Marxism to a predominantly religious society, nationalisation of European corporate property, and attempts at pan-African unions. Nasser promoted Pan-Africanism, and supported newly decolonized African countries both economically and ideologically. Nasserism became the basis of Nkrumaism, an African socialist ideology of the first President of Ghana, Kwame Nkrumah. Nkrumah declared Nasser's political thought his main inspiration, and postulated a form of African socialism based on combining Christian and Islam traditions, economic solidarity, and a concept of an egalitarian society based on Ghanaian tribal traditions.

The slogans adopted by Nasser and his movement gave Nasserism a populist character. After coming to power, the movement defined itself by the following six principles:

- The destruction of "imperialism and its stooges among Egyptian traitors";
- The ending of feudalism;
- The ending of monopoly and of the domination of capital over government;
- Establishment of social justice;
- Founding of a strong national army;
- Establishment of a sound democratic life.

Particularly central to Nasserism was anti-imperialism - Nasser was one of the main founders of the Non-Alignment Movement. The secularist nature of the movement can be seen through its policies, which neutralised the Al-Azhar Mosque through the imposition of non-religious education, regulation of Islamic endowments, and abolition of Shari'ah courts. However, the secularism of Nasserism was milder in comparison to the ideology of Mustafa Kemal Atatürk; Nasserist secularism was expressed through progressive reforms such as introducing women's right to vote and to education.

In world politics, Nasser's Egypt, along with Yugoslavia under Josip Broz Tito and India under Jawaharlal Nehru, was a major proponent of the Non-Aligned Movement, which advocated developing countries remaining outside the influence of the superpower blocs. This formed the basis of a third-worldist non-aligned Cold War movement advocated by Nasser. However, notwithstanding this policy and government suppression of communist organisations within Egypt, Egypt's deteriorating relations with Western powers, particularly following the Tripartite Aggression of 1956, made Egypt heavily dependent on military and civil assistance from the USSR. The same was true for other revolutionary Arab governments, which although repressive of communism within Arab borders, entered into strong longstanding relationships with communist states outside the Arab world. The Egyptian-Soviet alliance continued well into the presidency of Nasser's successor as president, Anwar Sadat, especially with regard to the Arab–Israeli conflict.

=== Socialism ===
One of the most unique properties of Nasserism was its embrace of socialism, an ideology previously deeply unpopular in Egypt. The notion of socialism was treated with hostility in pre-Nasser Egypt, as socialism was considered to be an inherently anti-religious doctrine that sought to displace the traditions and religion of Egypt. However, Nasserism adopted the term of socialism, implementing several meanings to it - while at first the Nasserite commitment to socialism was ambiguous, the movement never wavered in promoting it. As a result, Nasser "made it very popular among the Arab masses". Nasserism did embrace socialism, but objected to communist analysis of religion. It is also claimed that Nasserism rejected class struggle.

=== Religion ===
Though mindful of the spiritual heritage of the Arab world, as with Ba'athism, Nasserism is largely a secular ideology. Just as with other manifestations of Arab nationalism, this led to direct conflict with ideologically Islamic-oriented political movements in the Arab world from the 1950s onward, particularly the Muslim Brotherhood. Nasserists espouse an end to Western interference in Arab affairs, developing world solidarity, international non-alignment, modernisation and industrialisation. Nasser vehemently opposed Western imperialism, sharing the commonly held Arab view that Zionism was an extension of European colonialism on Arab soil.

Its secularism notwithstanding, Nasserism was deeply inspired by Islam. Nasser promoted an Islamic, Arab, and African form of socialism, which he saw as the alternative to the "Christian capitalism" of the West. Nasserist socialism became intertwined with nationalism, as Nasserists wanted to show that Africa and the Middle East could have their own socioeconomic solutions, instead of relying on either the ideological framework or material assistance of the West. Nasserism has been described as a form of Islamic socialism, and Nasser used Islam as a justification for state intervention, nationalization, and fighting economic injustice. Nasser's law according to which an individual was not allowed to own more than a stipulated amount was likewise based on Islamic teachings. However, while Nasserism was inspired by Islam and was not anti-religious, it differed from orthodox Islam and had secularizing tendencies which strengthened as Nasser pursued an alliance with the Soviet Union and gradually abandoned his anti-communist sentiments.

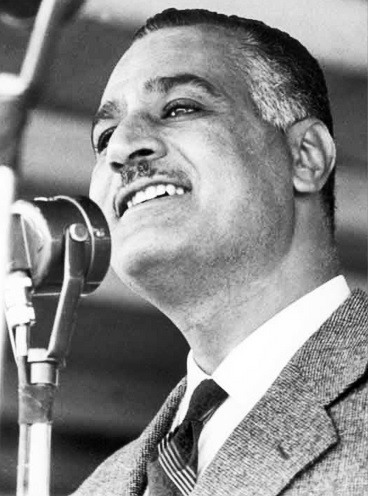
President Gamal Abdel Nasser during a public speech in 1960

=== Relationship with communism ===
Though opposed ideologically to Western capitalism, Arab socialism also developed as a rejection of communism, which was seen as incompatible with Arab traditions and their religious underpinnings. Nasserism referred to its socialism as "state socialism" or "white socialism", accentuating that it is opposed to "red socialism" of the Marxist type. The main reason for rejecting "red socialism" lied in its atheism. Nasserists held the Middle Eastern communists in contempt, as they argued that abolition of religion is necessary for the region to "progress" and "mature". Nasser and his followers saw this thesis as imposition of a foreign, Western dogma.

However, while in the 1950s Nasser persecuted communist organizations, the Unified Egyptian Communist Party supported Nasserism. Pro-Nasser communists justified their support on the basis of patriotism and Nasserite anti-Western foreign policy, including the creation of the Non-Aligned Movement and nationalization of the Suez Canal. The Nasserist nationalization and industrialization of the economy were also seen as progressive. Nasserists also maintained close relations with the Soviet Union, seeing it as an ally against Western imperialism. In 1956, Nikita Khrushchev acknowledged that although Nasser "was even imprisoning communists", the Soviet Union would continue to support him. During the 1956 Suez Crisis, Nasser helped communists who were willing to provide Egyptian army assistance.

By late 1950s, Nasserist foreign policy was based on "non-alignment and friendship with the communist bloc." Francesc Serra wrote that Egyptian communists "enthusiastically supported Gamal Abdel Nasser's Arab Nationalism and Arab Socialism", and the Egyptian Communist party merged with the Nasserist Arab Socialist Union. After Nasser's death, Nasserists would open further to collaboration with communists, and became a part of the 1977 Tagammu party which united Nasserists, nationalists, socialists and Marxists to represent the officially approved left.

== In the modern-day ==
Nasserism remains a political force throughout the Arab world, but in a markedly different manner than in its heyday. Whereas in the 1950s and 1960s Nasserism existed as a revolutionary and dynamic movement with definite political and social goals, by the 1980s it had become a much less pronounced and distinct ideology. As mentioned previously, Nasserism is seen more as "psychological and symbolic". Noting that even after its downfall by the 1980s it stayed present, just not as a political ideology.Today, many more Arabs are informed by Nasserism in a general sense than actually espouse its specific ideals and objectives. Zeyad el Nabolsy writes on the concept that Nasserism has left a form of "petty bourgeois politics" within the political culture of Egypt. Nabolsy explains that it has shaped the political imaginations of many citizens however not the political systems as a whole.

In terms of political organizations within Egypt itself and during the presidency of former Egyptian president Hosni Mubarak, Nasserism's scope was confined generally to writers, intellectuals and minor opposition parties. Nasserist movements were largely overshadowed by Islamic political organizations, especially the Muslim Brotherhood. This was a part of an overall trend within Egypt and the Arab world of Arab nationalism being overshadowed, and even eclipsed by political Islam. Podeh & Winckler, previously mentioned above have written how Nasserism was one of the leading factors in restoring Arab and Egyptian pride amongst themselves as well as the outside world. At the time these triumphs were revolutionary for the Arab world but, as the insituional power began to fall as did Egypt's ability to sustain the Nasserist ideology. In Egypt, the Nasserist Party styles itself as the successor to Nasser and his Arab Socialist Union, as does its offshoot, the Karama Party of Hamdeen Sabahi. However, as with all opposition parties in Egypt, their activities were severely limited by the Mubarak regime prior to the Egyptian revolution of 2011.

Whilst Nasser governed Egypt through a strictly authoritarian one-party system, with extreme limits on any form of political dissent, present-day Nasserists stress their support for democracy, explaining Nasser's autocratic excesses as necessary to implement his revolutionary policies. As many attempt to "revitalize Nasserism"they begin to reframe their core values such as anti-imperialism and national dignity while also attempting to please the other side such as the Muslim Brotherhood and include Islamic frameworks in the political ideology.

Nasserist views deeply influenced Iraqi Sunni Arab exceptionalism in Ba'athist Iraq, fostering a belief among Sunni elites that they were uniquely suited to lead Iraq and the Arab world, thereby reinforcing narratives of political dominance prior to the 2003 Invasion. Willard Ranges interpretation of Nasserism focuses mainly on the desire to have "honor dignity and self-esteem". It is not surprising that Nasserism has affected other groups in the creation of political ideologies, as many begin under the same pretenses Nasserism stands for, national dignity.

In Nasserism: The Shaping of the Ideology of the Egyptian Leadership after 1952 written by Zdnek Müller, Müller explains how Nasserism has lasted as powerful and persistent as it is. He explains that Nasserism was never focused on just one specific political framework. Instead, Nasserism drew from many different perspectives and sociological perspectives that as generations began to adjust and grow Nasserism was easily able to adapt to new social changes.

== Influence outside the Arab World ==
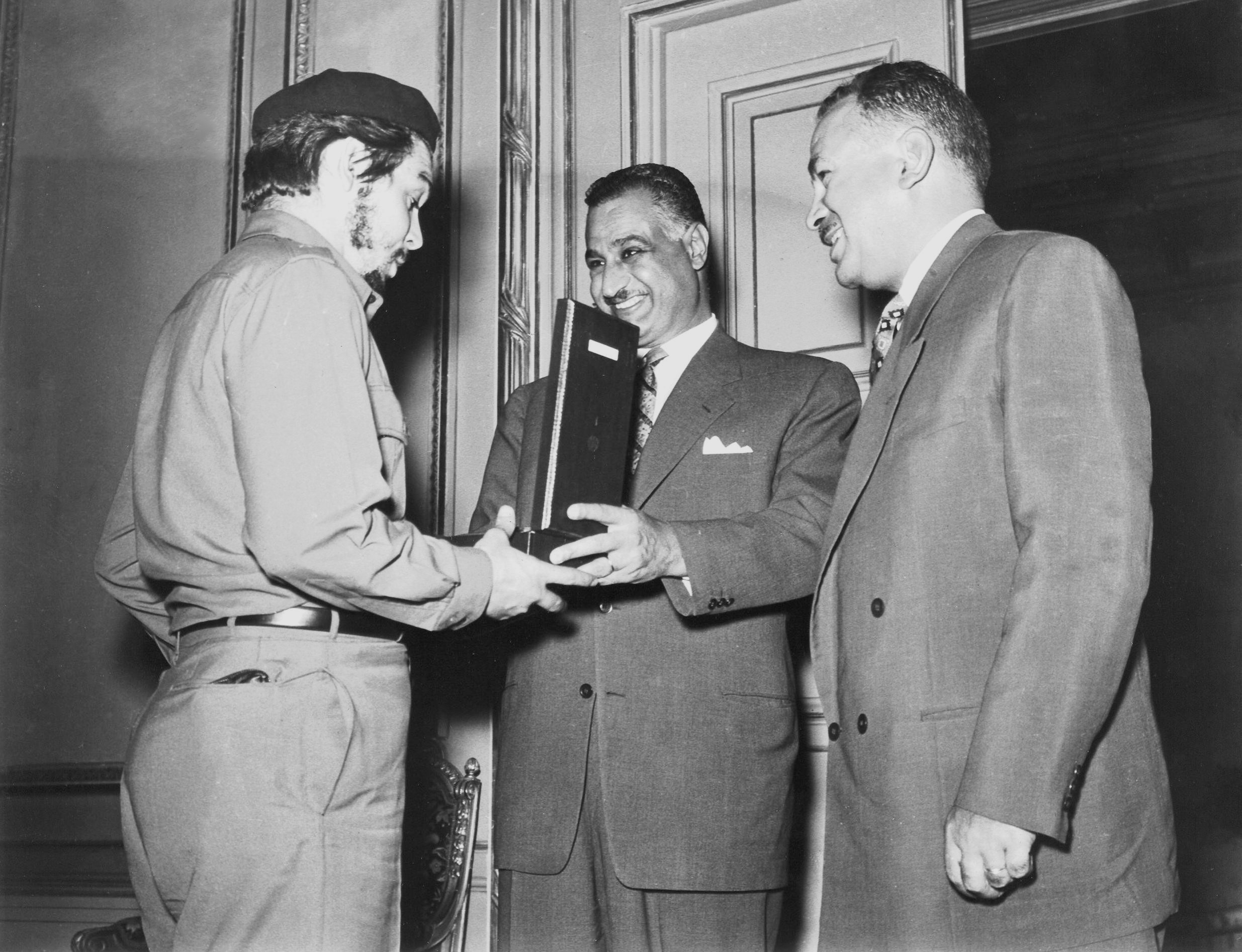
Nasser and Che Guevara in 1966

Despite being a quintessentially Arab ideology, Nasserism influenced to a degree left-wing movements in other parts of the developing world, particularly Sub-Saharan Africa and Latin America. Under Nasser, the Egyptian government gave both moral and material support to Sub-Saharan liberation movements fighting European imperialism. Nelson Mandela, the former South African President and Leader of the African National Congress, remarked that this support was crucial in helping sustain the morale of such movements, including in South Africa. Similar sentiments have been expressed by Fidel Castro, the former Cuban President, with regard to the Cuban Revolution and Cuba's later adversities with the United States Government. Both men stated that Egypt's resistance under Nasser against the joint British, French and Israeli invasion of Egypt in 1956 proved to be inspirational for their own movements.

Hugo Chávez, late President of Venezuela and leader of the self-styled Bolivarian Revolution, cited Nasserism as a direct influence on his own political thinking by stating: "Someone talked to me about his pessimism regarding the future of Arab nationalism. I told him that I was optimistic, because the ideas of Nasser are still alive. Nasser was one of the greatest people of Arab history. To say the least, I am a Nasserist, ever since I was a young soldier".

Besides Hugo Chávez and Fidel Castro, Juan Domingo Perón and Omar Torrijos were also influenced by nasserism.

Left-wing British politician George Galloway has referred to Gamal Abdel Nasser as "one of the greatest men of the 20th century" and has called repeatedly for Arab governments to embrace the tenets of Nasserism in the 21st century.

== See also ==
- Arab nationalism
- Arab socialism
- Arab Struggle Party
- Ba'athism
- Egyptian revolution of 1952
- Gamal Abdel Nasser
- Pan-Arabism

=== Similar ideologies ===
- Gaddafism
- Assadism
- Chavismo
- Fidelismo
- Guevarism
- Marhaenism
- Peronism
- Saddamism
- Titoism
