= Socialist Union =

Socialist Union may refer to:

- Arab Socialist Union (disambiguation), several organizations
- People's Socialist Union, an Ivorian political party based in London, founded in 1996
- Socialist Union of America, a Trotskyist group active from 1954 to 1959
- Socialist Union of Catalonia, active from 1923 to 1936
- Socialist Union (Chile)
- Socialist Union (Internationalist), an ex-Posadist group active in the early 1970s
- Socialist Union of Popular Forces, the largest political party in Morocco, founded in 1959
- Socialist Union (UK), a social democratic group active from 1885 to 1887
- Socialist Union (UK, 1950s), a social democratic group active in the Labour Party from 1950 to 1959
- Sudanese Socialist Union

== See also ==
- Socialist Unionists, a Nasserist political party in Syria, founded in 1961
- Socialist Unity (disambiguation)
