= 2006 Yemeni presidential election =

- 20 September 2006
- Registered: 9,247,390
- Turnout: 65.16% (▼2.32pp)
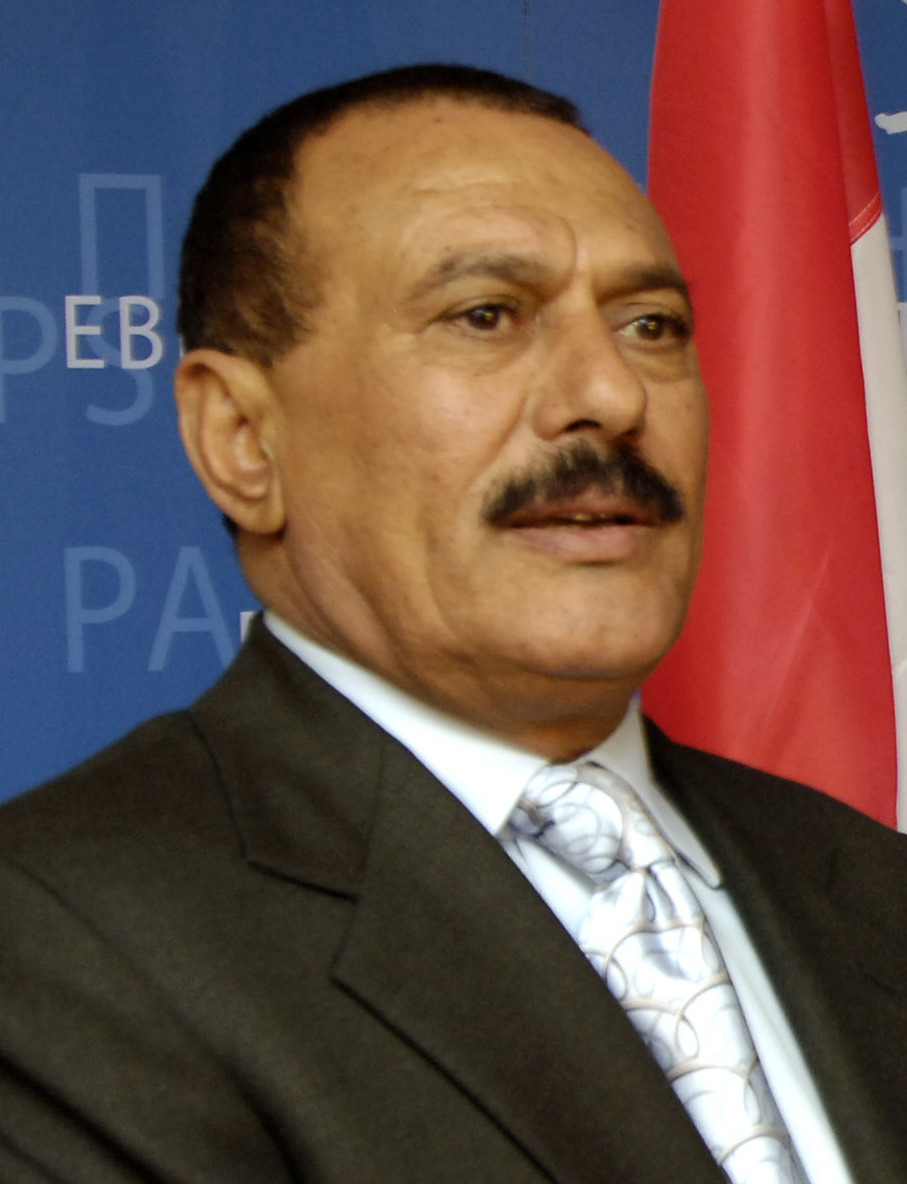

Nominee	Ali Abdullah Saleh	Faisal Bin Shamlan
Party	GPC	Independent
Alliance		JMP
Popular vote	4,149,673	1,173,075
Percentage	77.17%	21.82%
President before election
Ali Abdullah Saleh
GPC
Elected President
Ali Abdullah Saleh
GPC

Presidential elections were held in Yemen on 20 September 2006, alongside local elections. Incumbent president Ali Abdullah Saleh of the General People's Congress was re-elected to a seven-year term with 77% of the vote, defeating opposition coalition candidate Faisal Bin Shamlan.

== Campaign ==
Saleh had been president of modern Yemen since its reunification in 1990, and had previously been president of the Yemen Arab Republic from 1978 to 1990. He became Yemen's first directly elected president in 1999, winning more than 96% of the vote. On 17 July 2005, Saleh announced that he would not run for presidency in the 2006, later reconfirming his decision on 21 June 2006 when addressing fellow party members. His announcement sparked demonstrations urging Saleh to reverse his decision, as well as demonstrations urging Saleh to follow through with his decision. However, while addressing tens of thousands of supporters in Sana'a on 24 June 2006, Saleh rescinded his earlier decision stating "I comply with the people's pressure and upon the people's desire; I will run in the coming polls." This was not the first time Saleh has reversed the decision to not run, as he had previously done so prior to the 1999 elections.

The Joint Meeting Parties (JMP) opposition coalition was formed in 2002 by al-Islah, the Yemeni Socialist Party, the Party of Truth, the Unionist party, and the Popular Forces Union. On 2 July 2006 Faisal Bin Shamlan was named as the alliance's candidate. In addition to Saleh and Bin Shamlan, three other candidates contested the election: Fathi Mohammed al-Azab (independent), Yassin Abdo Saeed No'aman (National Opposition Council), and Ahmad al-Majeedi (independent). Prior to the reunification of South and North Yemen in 1990, Shamlan had been the Minister of Infrastructure and Oil in the socialist government of South Yemen.

Ahmad al-Majeedi of the Yemeni Socialist Party also contested the elections. However, as he announced his candidacy before consulting with the party's leadership, his membership of the party was frozen and he was accused of working for the ruling GPC.

== Conduct ==
On 29 August 2006, al-Majeedi's nephew Adel al-Majeedi was gunned down in his house by unidentified gunmen. Adel had been leading his uncle's election campaign in his home province of Lahj.

On 12 September 2006, at least 51 people were killed and more than 230 injured when a stampede broke out in a stadium packed with thousands of supporters of Yemeni president Ali Abdullah Saleh, with most of the dead being schoolchildren and teenagers who were transported by the government to the stadium by bus. Around 150,000 people were inside the stadium. The stadium exceeded its capacity of around 10,000 with a crowd that included government workers and students brought in on government buses.

Election day was marked by some violence; according to the opposition, eight people died in clashes. Khaled Hassan, an opposition Nasserist candidate running in the municipal elections, was killed in a clash with ruling party supporters in Taiz province.

== Results ==
Election officials said that about five million people voted out of around 9.2 million eligible voters. The opposition disputed early results showing Saleh with 82% of the vote, saying that the count gave Saleh 60% and Bin Shamlan 40%; it also claimed there had been electoral violations. The European Union Election Observation Mission called the election "an open and genuine contest", but with "important shortcomings". It said that at some polling stations there was intimidation, violation of voter secrecy, campaigning by the GPC, and underage voting.

Subsequent results, with most (17,000 out of 27,000) of the ballot boxes counted, continued to give Saleh an overwhelming majority, with 3.4 million votes against 880,000 for Bin Shamlan. The opposition, continuing to allege fraud, threatened a massive protest.

Final results on 23 September showed Saleh with 77.2% of the vote and Bin Shamlan with 21.8%. Bin Shamlan subsequently accepted the results as a "reality", although he said that they did not reflect the people's will. Saleh was sworn in for his new term on 27 September.

Candidate	Party	Votes	%
Ali Abdullah Saleh	General People's Congress	4,149,673	77.17
Faisal Bin Shamlan	Joint Meeting Parties	1,173,075	21.82
Fathi Mohammed al-Azab	Independent	24,524	0.46
Yassin Abdo Saeed No'aman	National Opposition Council	21,642	0.40
Ahmad al-Majeedi	Independent	8,324	0.15
Total		5,377,238	100.00
Valid votes		5,377,238	89.24
Invalid/blank votes		648,580	10.76
Total votes		6,025,818	100.00
Registered voters/turnout		9,247,390	65.16
Source: IFES
