= Herndon ArtSpace =

Coordinates: 38.9711°N 77.3875°W

Herndon ArtSpace is a local art gallery, arts lab and performance space located in downtown Herndon, Virginia. Devoted to the development of visual arts and media, as well as small-scale musical, dramatic and film arts, Artspace has been supporting the developments of arts and artists within the Herndon community and Fairfax County, Virginia. ArtSpace is a place to celebrate the arts, showcasing artwork and events by local, regionally, and nationally known artists and performers.

ArtSpace was first established in 2008 as a project of the Herndon Foundation for the Cultural Arts. The Foundation's mission is to promote and support the creation of a full-scale arts center in downtown Herndon. Each year, the Artspace presents between 10 and 11 exhibits. ArtSpace and the HFCA have recently merged with the Council for the Arts of Herndon under the new name "Arts Herndon". ArtSpace is continues to be used as a community gathering space for events. The gallery also includes space for classes and workshops. Entrance is free, and there is plentiful free parking. Works of art are for sale, as are small gifts. Ticketed events include music, film and drama.

ArtSpace Herndon is primarily staffed with volunteers and supported by grants and donations. As a community art center, ArtSpace Herndon relies on the generous support of citizens, businesses and organizations.
