= Arab Socialist Union (Iraq) =

1964–1968 Nasserist political party in Iraq

Iraqi Arab Socialist Union الاتحاد الاشتراكي العربي العراقي
- Leader: Fuad ar-Rikabi
- Founded: 1964
- Dissolved: 1968
- Preceded by: Arab Struggle Party
- Succeeded by: Nasserist Socialist Vanguard Party (2003, spiritual successor)
- Headquarters: Baghdad, Iraqi Republic
- Ideology: Arab nationalism Arab socialism Pan-Arabism; Nasserism; Anti-imperialism; Republicanism
- Political position: Left-wing
- Egyptian counterpart: Arab Socialist Union

Party flag

The Iraqi Arab Socialist Union (Arabic: الاتحاد الاشتراكي العربي العراقي, Al-Ittiḥād Al-Ištirākī Al-ʿArabī Al-Iraqi) was an Iraqi political party based on the principles of Nasserist Arab socialism. It was a sister party to the Arab Socialist Union parties that formed in other Arab countries.

== History ==
Nasserism had long been a force within the regime of Qasim, with small groups such as the Arab Struggle Party, advocating for a rise up against the Iraqi nationalist views of Qasim in favour of establishing a Nasserist Arab socialist state in Iraq.

In Iraq after the overthrow of the Baathists, between the Ramadan and the July 1965 revolt of President Abdul Salam Arif, the ASU was the only officially authorized party, but it could not effectively compete with the traditionally influential parties and power groups.

The launch of the Arab Socialist Union as the sole legal party in Iraq was announced on July 14, 1964, with a charter akin to that of the Arab Socialist Union in the United Arab Republic. Later the same day the Arab Nationalist Movement and a number of minor political organizations (the Democratic Socialist Unionists, the Arab Socialist Party and the Socialist Union Movement) merged into the Arab Socialist Union. The long term intent of the party was to promote the gradual economic, military and political union of Egypt and Iraq. The party Chair was the former secretary general of the Iraqi Baath Party, Fuad al-Rikabi. The General Secretary and Information Minister was Abdul Karim Farhan. In September 1964 the Egyptian and Iraqi ASU were combined in a joint Executive Committee under Nasser's leadership.

As of February 1965 the Iraqi Arab Socialist Union claimed around 70,000 members.

After coup attempts by Prime Minister Nasser Arif Abd ar-Razzaq (September 1965, July 1966) and Abdul Karim Farhan (October 1965) and the failure of the Egyptian-Iraqi union plans the Iraqi ASU in October 1966 was put under the government. A group led by al-Rikabi split to form the Arab Socialist Movement (ASM). Arif was overthrown in July 1968 by a Baathist military coup, which immediately dissolved the IASU Preparatory Committee. Ar-Rikabi was imprisoned (where he died in 1971).

== Gallery ==
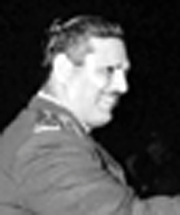
Arif Abd ar-Razzaq

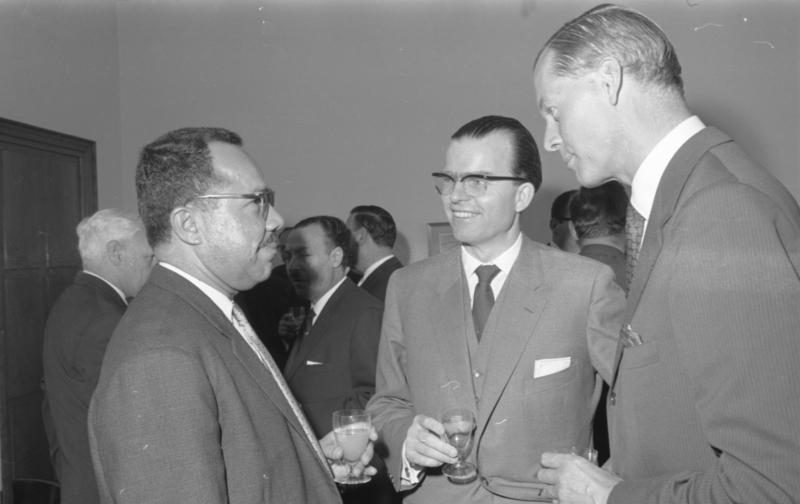
Abd al-Karim Farhan (left)

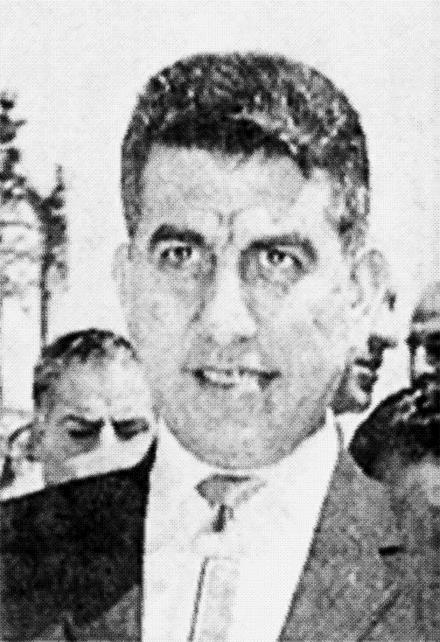
Fuad Al-Rikabi

== See also ==
- Arab Socialist Union (Egypt)
- Arab Socialist Union (Libya)
- Arab Socialist Union Party (Syria)
