= Islamic state (disambiguation) =

Islamic state may refer to historical polities or theories of governance in the Islamic world or to a modern notion (dawla islamiyya) associated with political Islam.

Islamic state may also refer to:

- First Islamic state, a polity established in Medina in 622
- Islamic State of Afghanistan, the official name of the country Afghanistan from 1992 to 2001
- Transitional Islamic State of Afghanistan, transitional state after the fall of the Islamic State of Afghanistan in 2002
- Islamic State of Iraq (ISI), a Sunni jihadist group that aimed to establish an Islamic state in Iraq from 2006 to 2013
- Islamic State (IS), also known as the Islamic State of Iraq and Syria (ISIS) or the Islamic State of Iraq and the Levant (ISIL), or Daesh (based on its Arabic acronym), an outgrowth of ISI with a greater geographic scope
  - Abu Sayyaf, also known as the Islamic State – East Asia Province
  - Islamic State – Algeria Province
  - Islamic State – Caucasus Province
  - Islamic State – Central Africa Province
  - Islamic State – Khorasan Province
  - Islamic State – Sinai Province
  - Islamic State – West Africa Province
  - Islamic State – Yemen Province
  - Islamic State – Sahel Province, formerly known as the Islamic State in the Greater Sahara Islamic State in the Greater Sahara
  - Islamic State – Libya Province
  - Islamic State – Somalia Province
- Azawad, a territory in Mali, also known as the Islamic State of Azawad
- Guardianship of the Islamic Jurist
- The Islamic State (documentary), a VICE News documentary about ISIS

== See also ==
- Islamic republic (disambiguation)
- Muslim world
- Caliphate (disambiguation)
- Ummah (disambiguation)
- Pan-Islam
- Nation of Islam
- Arab state
