= Faisal Bin Shamlan =

Faisal Othman Bin Shamlan

Minister of Oil and Mineral Resources
- In office October 1994 – March 1995
- President: Ali Abdullah Saleh
- Prime Minister: Abdul Aziz Abdul Ghani
- Succeeded by: Muhammad Said al-Attar

Member of the House of Representatives
- In office 22 May 1990 – 2003

Member of the Supreme People's Council
- In office 1971 – 22 May 1990

Minister of Public Works and Transport
- In office 1967–1969
- President: Qahtan Muhammad al-Shaabi
- Prime Minister: Faysal al-Shaabi

Personal details
- Born: 1934 Hadhramaut, Aden Protectorate
- Died: 1 January 2010 (aged 74) Aden, Yemen
- Party: Yemeni Free Forum
- Education: Kingston University; Bakht al-Ridha Institute

Faisal Othman Bin Shamlan (1934 – 1 January 2010) (فيصل عثمان بن شملان) (faiṣal bin šamlān) was a Yemeni intellectual, technocrat, political reformist and public figure. He was a Yemeni member of parliament who had held the post of Oil and Mineral Resources Minister in the post-unification government of Yemen. Prior to the reunification of Yemen in 1990, Shamlan was the Minister of Infrastructure and Oil in the socialist government of South Yemen. He was the recognized presidential candidate of the Yemeni opposition coalition, a coalition which consists of the Islamist Islah, the Yemen Socialist Party and several smaller parties, in the 2006 presidential election, but was defeated by incumbent president Ali Abdullah Saleh.

== Early life ==
Originally from Hadhramaut, Shamlan was educated in the elite Ghayl ba-Wazeer School [ġail bā wazīr], which was one of the best schools in Yemen and beyond at the time. He then got a scholarship to Sudan to further his education in Bakht al-Ridha Institute (bakht al-riḍa). From there he went to study Civil Engineering at Kingston University, in London, United Kingdom.

Bin Shamlan, along with his school mates, played an important role in the history of modern Yemen. As a young activist, he was a mild Islamic nationalist, who, with other intellectuals from Hadhramaut and other parts of Yemen, was a pioneering activist in a moderate Islamic thought movement. But he preserved an independent position at the centre of the political spectrum.

== Role in South Yemen government ==
During the war of liberation of occupied South Yemen he was part of a broad coalition of activists who overthrew the Qu'aiti Sultanate in Hadhramaut on 17 September 1967. In the interim period, before independence on 30 November 1967, he was a member of the "Supreme Popular Committee" which was formed by the revolutionaries to run Hadhramaut Governorate. Bin Shamlan was charged with the day-to-day running of the province.

After independence and the unification of South Yemen by the National Front for the Liberation of South Yemen (NLF), he was the first Minister of Public Works and Transport in the first cabinet of the independent People's Republic of South Yemen (President Qahtan Al-Shaabi's government). Bin Shamlan and Mohammad Abdul Qader Bafaqeeh, the Minister of Education, were the only non NLF members of the cabinet. One of the first tasks assigned to them by the NLF government was taking inventory of the palaces of the Sultans of Hadhramaut. Bin Shamlan and Bafaqeeh took stock of the palaces; made a record inventory; and preserved and stored every item.

In 1969, Bin Shamlan was appointed as Executive Chairman of the Public Corporation for Electric Power which he continued to run successfully and efficiently until 1977. In 1977 he was appointed as Managing Director of the Aden Oil Refinery. Taking over from the BP management team, he ran the refinery professionally. From 1971 to 1990 he was a member of Supreme People's Council (the Parliament of People's Democratic Republic of Yemen).

== Role in post-unification Yemeni government ==
After the 1990 unity, Bin Shamlan was a member of the Council of Representatives (the parliament of the Republic of Yemen, as the head of the independent block. As the multi-party system was adopted in the new Yemen after unity he founded along with Mr. Omar Tarmoom, Dr. Mohammad A.Q. Bafaqeeh, Dr. Kramah Salyan, and others a new moderate party called the Yemeni Free Forum, and issued a forum journal.

In the 1993 and 1997 parliamentary elections he ran again for parliament and kept his seat, with a 66% vote. During the 1994 crisis he was in the unity camp. On 29 September 1994, the parliament approved a series of amendments to the constitution which, among other things, abolished the presidential council and replaced it with a one-man presidency. Two days later, parliament elected Ali Abdullah Saleh as president for a five-year term. Faisal Bin Shamlan, (independent) was a candidate along with three other candidates representing Islah, YSP and Ba'ath parties. He continued a Member of Parliament until 2003, when he resigned in protest to the amendment to the Constitution by which the parliament extended its tenure for a further 2 years, which Bin Shamlan deemed an unconstitutional move and resigned on the ground that his 4-year mandate by the people is over.

He was appointed as Minister of Oil and Mineral Resources from October 1994, which he accepted on the condition that he would have power to reorganize and reform the Ministry. In March 1995, he resigned. In June 1995, in a Cabinet reshuffle President Saleh replaced Faisal Bin Shamlan with Mohammed Said al-Attar, formerly Deputy Prime Minister and Minister of Industry, as Minister of Oil and Mineral Resources, in a move to tie the oil ministry closer to the President's office.

In 1998-99, Bin Shamlan along with several Yemeni public figures including Dr. Faraj Bin Ghanim (ex Prime Minister, Dr. Abubakar Al-Qirby (Current Foreign Minister), Engineer Mohammed Al-Tayyeb (ex minister, GPC), Mr. Mohammed Abdo Saeed (business man), Dr. Mohammed Al-Afandi (economist, Islah Party), Ahmed Saleh Al-Salami (Yemeni Socialist Party activist), and Abdulaziz Al-Saqqaf (journalist and human rights activist), were working to set up the first Yemeni think tank, under the name of Yemen 21 Forum (Y21F) to help the country's evolution towards democracy, development, harmony and prosperity. The Y21F tasks included providing logistics for non-governmental organizations; addressing national issues and concerns; to co-sponsor and promote the establishment of the Yemeni Transparency, an anti-corruption NGO; to help in the ongoing correction and reform efforts; and to publish data and analysis on a periodic basis, and to issue an annual "State of the Nation" report.

== Presidential bid ==
On 2 July 2006 the Joint Meeting Parties (JMP) opposition coalition officially announced that Bin Shamlan would be the JMP candidate for the presidential election of September 2006. In the election, held on 20 September, bin Shamlan received about 22% of the vote according to official results.

== Death ==
Bin Shamlan died in Aden on 1 January 2010 after a lengthy battle with cancer and having sought treatment abroad.
