= Yassin Abdoh Saeed Noman =

Yemeni politician, diplomat, and international expert

Secretary-General of the Nasserist Democratic Party
- In office 2003–2007

Member of the Supreme National Authority for Combating Corruption
- In office July 2007 – September 2013

Head of Media Sector, Supreme National Authority for Combating Corruption

Deputy Minister of Social Affairs and Labour (with ministerial rank)
- In office December 2004 – July 2007

Advisor to the Minister of Youth and Sports
- In office March 2003 – December 2004

Member of the Supreme Commission for Elections and Referendum
- In office 1992–1993

Director General of the Youth and Sports Office in Taiz Governorate
- In office 1990–1997

Personal details
- Born: 12 June 1952 Al Maqatrah, Lahij Governorate, Yemen
- Died: 2 December 2020 (aged 68) Sanaa, Yemen
- Resting place: Al-Qadimi Cemetery, Al-Jaraf, Sanaa
- Party: Nasserist Democratic Party
- Children: 5
- Education: Ain Shams University (BBA)
- Occupation: Politician, diplomat, international expert

Yassin Abdoh Saeed Noman (Arabic: ياسين عبده سعيد نعمان; 12 June 1952 – 2 December 2020) was a Yemeni politician, diplomat, and international expert, and one of the prominent leaders of the Nasserist movement in Yemen. He served as Secretary-General of the Nasserist Democratic Party and was a member of the Supreme National Authority for Combating Corruption. He was also a candidate in the 2006 Yemeni presidential election.

== Early life and education ==
Yassin Abdoh Saeed Noman was born on 12 June 1952 in Al Maqatrah District, Lahij Governorate, Yemen. He earned a Bachelor of Business Administration (BBA) from Ain Shams University in Egypt. During his studies in Cairo, he was active in the Yemeni Students' Union, serving as head of the Union of Yemeni Students in Egypt, and also headed the Arab Cultural Club at the Faculty of Commerce at Ain Shams University.

He also had a prominent role in youth and civil society work. He was a founding member of the Al-Tali'a Sports and Cultural Club in 1966 and served as its president from 1967 to 1969. He was Vice President of the Founding Conference of the Yemeni Expatriates Union in March 1976, and a member of the Central Council of the Yemeni Economic Association.

== Political career ==
Noman joined the Nasserist movement in Yemen in February 1972, becoming a leading figure in the Organization of Yemeni Vanguard Unity, the covert Nasserist organization in Yemen. He held several leadership positions within the organization, including Secretary-General of the organization's branch in Egypt, Secretary-General of the Organization of Yemeni Vanguard Unity, and head of the Political and Foreign Relations Secretariat. He was elected Secretary-General of the organization at its sixth general conference in 1980.

Following the establishment of the Nasserist Democratic Party in the 1990s, Noman served as its Deputy Secretary-General from 1990 to 2003, and then as its Secretary-General from 2003 until 2007. He also headed the Council of National Opposition Parties (2003–2006). In March 1976, he served as Vice President of the Founding Conference of the Yemeni Expatriates Union. He was a member of the National Alignment Committee for Free and Fair Elections in 2003, and was described as "the sage of politics" with contributions to the national struggle.

== 2006 presidential election ==
In the 2006 Yemeni presidential election, Noman ran as a candidate representing the National Opposition Council. He received 21,642 votes, accounting for 0.40% of the total valid votes.

== Relations with Nasserist leaders ==
Noman had close relationships with several prominent Nasserist leaders in Yemen. Among his closest associates was Issa Mohammed Saif, who preceded him as Secretary-General of the Organization of Yemeni Vanguard Unity. Noman served as Secretary of the Nasserist branch in Cairo alongside Saif, and they shared a close friendship and collaboration. He succeeded Saif as Secretary-General of the organization after Saif's execution.

He was also associated with President Ibrahim al-Hamdi, a symbol of the Nasserist movement in Yemen. His relationship with al-Hamdi dates back to a historic meeting in Cairo in November 1973, where al-Hamdi, then a colonel in the Yemeni army, met Noman (as head of the Yemeni Students' Union in Cairo) and Ali Abdullah Saeed al-Dalai at the Sheraton Cairo Hotel. This meeting was followed by coordination between al-Hamdi and the Nasserist organization, which developed into a close relationship after the 13 June 1974 corrective movement.

Other Nasserist leaders with whom Noman maintained political and intellectual relations include: Hatim Abu Hatim, Ali Abdul Mughni, Abdul Salam Muqbil, Abdul Ghani Thabit, Abdullah al-Shamsi, and Ali Qanaf Zahra.

== Government positions ==
Noman held several senior government positions, including:

- Member of the Supreme National Authority for Combating Corruption (July 2007 – September 2013), and head of its Media Sector.
- Member of the Open-ended Intergovernmental Working Group on the Review of the Implementation of the United Nations Convention against Corruption (2008–2013).
- Deputy Minister of Social Affairs and Labour (with ministerial rank) for the Labour Sector (December 2004 – July 2007).
- Member of the Board of Directors of the Vocational Training and Rehabilitation Fund (2004–2007).
- Advisor to the Minister of Youth and Sports (March 2003 – December 2004).
- Member of the Supreme Commission for Elections and Referendum (1992–1993).
- Director General of the Youth and Sports Office in Taiz Governorate (1990–1997).
- Deputy Director General of the Supreme Council for Youth and Sports for Youth and Scouting Affairs in Taiz Governorate (1987–1990).

== International participation ==
Noman participated in numerous international conferences, seminars, workshops, and training courses. He was one of three Yemeni experts selected by the United Nations in September 2010 to participate in the review mechanism of the implementation of the United Nations Convention against Corruption.

He also participated in the 36th session of the Arab Council of Ministers of Labour and Social Affairs, held in Cairo, Egypt, in December 2006, representing Yemen. He also participated in the Arab General Conference in Support of the Arab Popular Revolutions (emergency session), held in Beirut, Lebanon, on 27 February 2011, in support of the Arab Spring uprisings.

=== Selected international conferences and workshops ===
- Arab General Conference in Support of the Arab Popular Revolutions – Beirut, Lebanon (February 2011).
- Second Conference of States Parties to the UN Convention against Corruption – Bali, Indonesia (January–February 2008).
- Regional Conference on Economic and Employment Development – Cairo, Egypt (November 2006).
- World Bank Conference on Creating Job Opportunities – Cairo, Egypt (December 2005).
- Workshop for Government Experts on the UN Convention against Corruption – Vienna, Austria (December 2008).
- Regional Training for Government Experts on the Review Mechanism – Rabat, Morocco (September 2010).
- Participation in the UN Convention against Corruption review mechanism for Brunei Darussalam (March 2012).
- Participation in the UN Convention against Corruption review mechanism for Mongolia (November 2010).

== Lectures and academic papers ==
Noman presented numerous lectures and academic papers, including:

- "The Yemeni Revolution: Reality and Ambition" (2011).
- "A Historical Leader Who Made His Glory" (2008).
- "Yemeni Unity and the Horizons of the Future" – Amran University (2008).
- "Constitutional Amendments between the Presidential and Parliamentary Systems" – Dhamar University (2007).
- "A Decade and a Half of Unity, Democracy, and Human Rights" (2005).
- "Crisis Management and Decision-Making" – Taiz (2001).

== Legacy and death ==
Noman was described as a "sage of politics" and had significant contributions to the national struggle in Yemen. He died on 2 December 2020 in Sanaa, Yemen, at the age of 68. He was buried the following day in Al-Qadimi Cemetery in the Al-Jaraf district of Sanaa.

== See also ==
- Nasserist Democratic Party
- Organization of Yemeni Vanguard Unity
- 2006 Yemeni presidential election
- Council of National Opposition Parties
- Supreme National Authority for Combating Corruption (Yemen)
