= Michael Vatikiotis =

American journalist and writer (born 1957)

- Born: Indianapolis, United States
- Education: SOAS University of London; St Catherine's College, Oxford (PhD)
- Writing career
- Genres: Fiction; narrative nonfiction; political analysis; travel writing; journalism
- Subjects: Southeast Asia; Asian politics; Asian arts and culture; conflict studies
- Website: mvatikiotis.com

Michael Vatikiotis is an American writer, journalist, and private diplomat working in Southeast Asia since 1987. He has been an editor at the Far Eastern Economic Review, he was a Hong Kong–based news magazine correspondent for sixteen years, and he served as the Asian regional director of the Centre for Humanitarian Dialogue, a Geneva-based NGO that facilitates dialogue to resolve armed conflicts. Vatikiotis is a novelist, he writes opinion pieces for international and regional newspapers, and he regularly contributes to Al Jazeera and the BBC.

== Education and early career ==
His father was the historian Panayiotis Jerasimof Vatikiotis, and his mother was from a Sephardic Jewish Italian family from Livorno that moved to Egypt in the 19th century. Vatikiotis graduated from the School of Oriental and African Studies in London with a first-class honours degree and then a Doctor of Philosophy at St. Catherine's College, Oxford, in 1984. He studied Southeast Asian history and languages, and his doctoral research was on the northern Thai city of Chiang Mai.

After a period spent as a production trainee with the BBC World Service in London, Vatikiotis served as a producer in Northern Ireland and was then posted to Jakarta as a BBC correspondent in 1987. He joined the Far Eastern Economic Review as Jakarta bureau chief in 1988. He served as bureau chief for the magazine in Kuala Lumpur (1991–1994) and Bangkok (1994–1997). He was also president of the Foreign Correspondents' Club of Thailand.

== Writing ==
In 1993, Vatikiotis published his first book, Indonesian Politics under Suharto (ISBN 978-0-415-10707-5). In 1996, he published Political Change in Southeast Asia: Trimming the Banyan Tree (ISBN 978-0-415-13484-2).

His first work of fiction was published in 2001, after he moved to Hong Kong as managing editor of the Far Eastern Economic Review. Debatable Land (ISBN 978-981-04-2623-1) is a collection of short stories set in Southeast Asia that focus on the region's political transition. As stated in an article in The Wall Street Journal Asia about the work, "Neither fact, nor history, nor entirely fiction, Mr. Vatikiotis's stories dwell in the twilight region between reportage and literature."

In 2004, Vatikiotis published The Spice Garden (ISBN 978-9799796424), a novel set in the eastern Indonesian islands of Maluku. The story follows two friends, a Catholic priest and a Muslim trader, who confront a sudden and terrifying outbreak of religious conflict. Time magazine praised the novel for "evoking the sights and scents of the Tropics, unsparing in its portrayal of the violence of the era". The article added that Vatikiotis is "admirably evenhanded in his attempts to elucidate the social forces that underlay it."

John Walsh at The Asian Review of Books commented that the novel "Ultimately, celebrates the ambiguity and compromise that human frailty requires for societal continuity", later adding, "Vatikiotis is to be praised for bringing this episode to greater public attention and presenting it with skill and sensitivity".

In 2007, Vatikiotis published Singapore Ground Zero (ISBN 978-981-05-8782-6), a second collection of short stories, addressing misconceptions about Muslim fundamentalism, which he feels is an aspect of the region that is distorted in the way it is projected in the media. When discussing Ground Zero, the author recalled: "I wanted to write stories that highlight the ironies and contradictions of the situation and bring out different aspects of the problem other than the mainstream ones." He stated that fiction actually gives him more freedom than journalism to focus on certain aspects of an issue.

Another novel, The Painter of Lost Souls, (ISBN 978-9792510089) was published in 2012. It is the story of Sito, a gifted artist who leaves his home in a poor village in Central Java while still in his teens, to make his name and fortune in the royal city of Yogyakarta. The Wall Street Journal noted that Vatikiotis "writes earnestly about Indonesia, and his novel brims with edifying discursions on Javanese history, culture and religion", while also mentioning that "Mr. Vatikiotis's reporting experience in the region is obvious in the novel's colorful details on local history and urban–rural contrasts."

Vatikiotis has contributed essays and text to two books of photography: Over Indonesia: Aerial Views of the Archipelago (ISBN 978-9813018846), published in 1992, with photography by Rio Helmi and Guido Alberto Rossi, and Indonesia: Islands of the Imagination (ISBN 978-0804843980), published in 2006, with photography by Jill Gocher.

In 2017, he published Blood and Silk: Power and Conflict in Modern Southeast Asia (ISBN 978-1474602006), an observer's account of the changing social and political landscape of Southeast Asia.

== Professional experience ==
Vatikiotis joined the Geneva-based Centre for Humanitarian Dialogue in 2005 and has worked on promoting and facilitating dialogue in armed conflict around Asia. The BBC reported that when he was brought in to negotiate between the Thai government and protesting Red Shirts in the heart of Bangkok in 2010, "He discovered that though the rebels hadn't spoken face to face with the government, they were being phoned by government ministers on their mobiles and conducting ad hoc negotiations on the move. He had to persuade the Red Shirts to put their demands down in writing, rather than relying on unstructured negotiations with the authorities."

== Bibliography ==
- 1993 Indonesian Politics Under Suharto (London, Routledge)
- 1996 Political Change in Southeast Asia: Trimming the Banyan Tree (London, Routledge)
- 2001 Debatable Land (Singapore, Talisman)
- 2004 The Spice Garden (Jakarta, Equinox)
- 2007 Singapore Ground Zero (Singapore, Talisman)
- 2012 The Painter of Lost Souls (Jakarta, Lontar)
- 2017 Blood and Silk: Power and Conflict in Modern Southeast Asia (London, Weidenfeld & Nicolson)
