= Islamic republic (disambiguation) =

Islamic republic is the name given to several states or countries ruled by Islamic laws.

Islamic republic may also refer to:

- Iran, officially the Islamic Republic of Iran
- Mauritania, officially the Islamic Republic of Mauritania
- Pakistan, officially the Islamic Republic of Pakistan
- Islamic Republic of Afghanistan, 2004-2021 government of Afghanistan
- Islamic Republic of The Gambia, name in 2015-2017
- Arab Islamic Republic, a proposed unification of Tunisia and Libya in 1974
- United Islamic Republic, a fictional state in Tom Clancy's 1996 novel Executive Orders

== See also ==
- Islamic state (disambiguation)
- Arab Republic (disambiguation)
