= Arab Struggle Party =

Arab Struggle Party حزب الكفاح العربي
- Founded: 1960
- Succeeded by: IIAI
- Ideology: Nasserism

Party flag

The Arab Struggle Party (Arabic: حزب الكفاح العربي) was an underground Nasserist opposition group in Iraq. In mid-1960 the group distributed leaflets in various Iraqi cities, calling for an uprising against Abd al-Karim Qasim's rule. This caused further tensions between Abd al-Karim Qasim and the United Arab Republic (UAR), and as a result the UAR began to aid rebellions in Iraqi Kurdistan against the government.

Thirty followers of Arab Struggle Party were arrested for distributing propaganda against the Iraqi regime. Thirteen were released and the remainder were put on trial.
