= Unified Political Command =

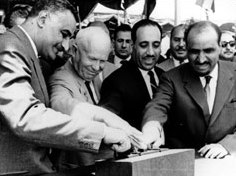
From left to right: Nasser, Khrushchev, Arif and as-Sallal in Egypt (May 1964)

A Unified Political Command (Arabic: قيادة سياسية موحدة, qiyāda siyāsiyya muwaḥḥada), also translated as Joint Political Command or Unified Political Leadership, was agreed in 1964 between the presidents of Egypt and Iraq (Gamal Abdel Nasser and Abdul Salam Arif) as well as between the presidents of Egypt and North Yemen (Nasser and Abdullah as-Sallal). Both projects were parallel but not linked with each other. The Unified Political Command was meant as a kind of transitional government which should prepare the gradual merger of Iraq with Egypt and North Yemen with Egypt in a new United Arab Republic.

== Egypt and Iraq ==
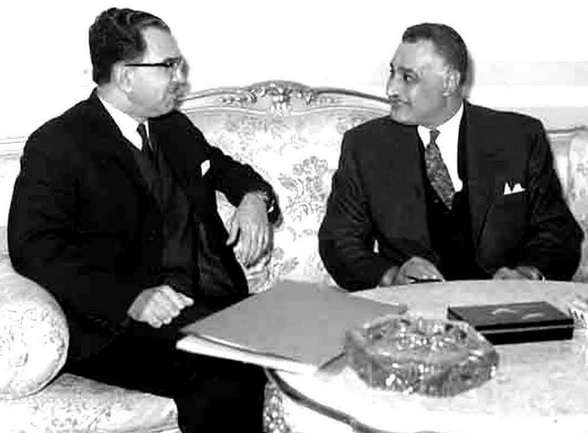
Nasser with the Iraqi Prime Minister al-Bazzaz (left): Still in February 1966 the Egyptian-Iraqi Unified Political Command declared its satisfaction about the merger progress in both republics

On 26 May 1964 Nasser and Arif agreed to form a joint Presidential Council and a Unified Political Command on 16 October 1964. This Unified Command was established on 20 December 1964 and did include the prime ministers of Egypt and Iraq as well as the ministers of economic and financial affairs and social planning of both sides and should act as a joint supreme instrument and highest executive authority to establish the economic, political and military unification of Egypt and Iraq within two years. The Iraqi Abd ar-Razzaq Muhyi ad-Din (Abdel Razzaq Mohieddin) became General Secretary of the Unified Command. In July 1964 an Iraqi Arab Socialist Union was founded as political instrument to collect the support of the population and was formally united with the Egyptian Arab Socialist Union in September 1964. Also, in September 1964, Egypt and Iraq agreed to unite their diplomatic corps and representations all over the world. In 1965 Iraq adopted the Egyptian coat of arms eagle and the Egyptian national anthem, declared Iraq as a democratic and socialist republic and announced a programme of nationalization. However, despite a few real meetings and sessions of this Unified Political Command the project stopped when the Nasserist prime minister of Iraq, Arif Abd ar-Razzaq, tried to overthrow president Arif in September 1965 and when Arif died in April 1966.

== Egypt and Yemen ==
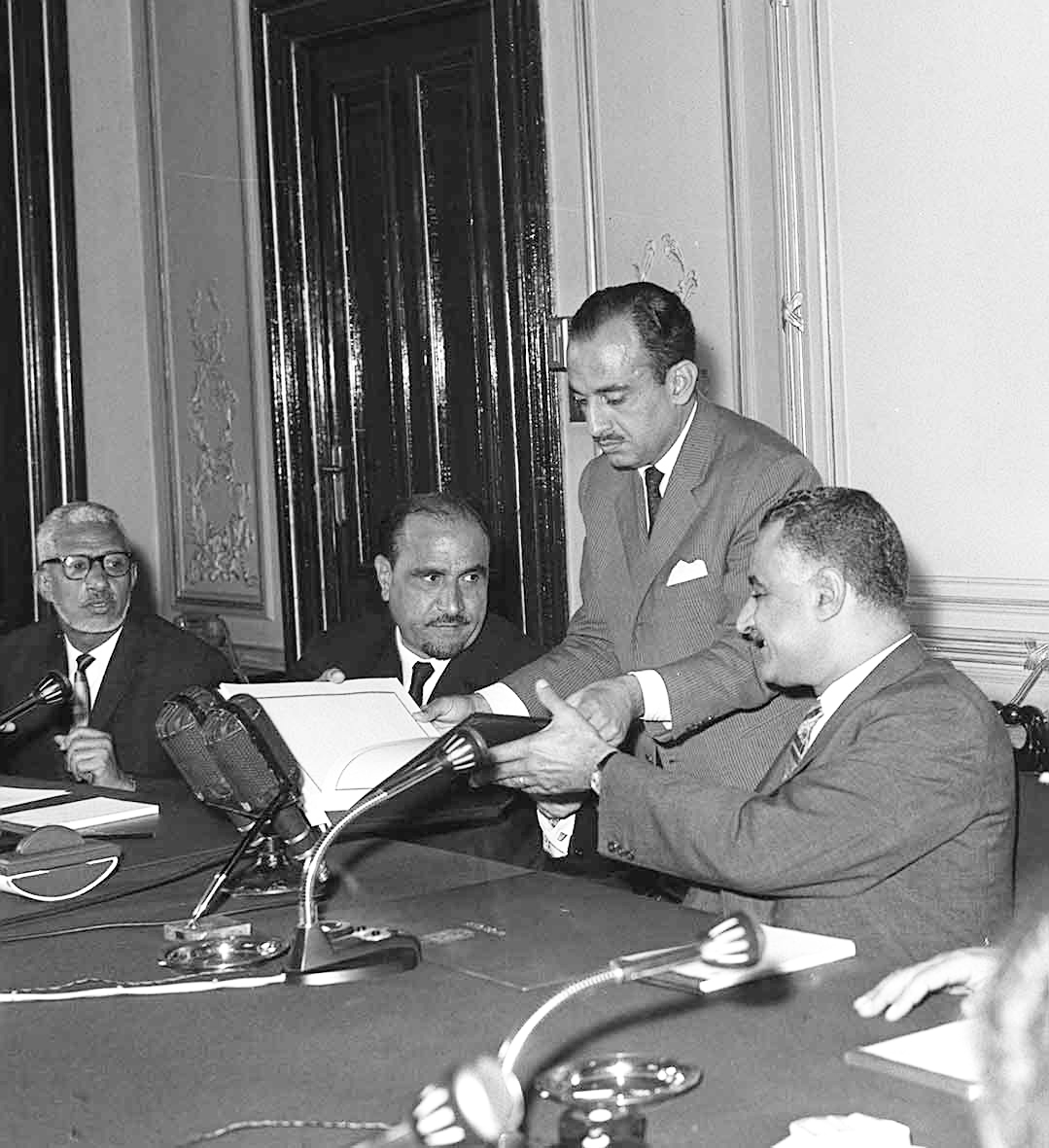
In July 1964 Nasser and Sallal agreed about the gradual merger of Egypt and Yemen towards a full union

Parallelly, but not linked with the Egyptian-Iraqi merger project also between Nasser and as-Sallal a Unified Political Command was established on 13 July 1964. A joint government council of the Egyptian and Yemeni ministers should coordinate and integrate the foreign, defense, economic, social, cultural and information policy towards full unity. A (short-lived) Yemeni Arab Socialist Union (later renamed) was established already in 1964 and, in fact, Egyptian generals and officers took over the command of the republican forces in Yemen during the North Yemen Civil War. This civil war, however, prevented any progress and when Egypt withdrew its troops from Yemen after the Six-Day War as-Sallal was overthrown in November 1967, and also this project definitively ended.

== Others ==
Similar Unified Political Commands and Joint Supreme Committees were planned and formed

- between the Syrian president Hafez al-Assad and king Hussein of Jordan in July 1975 in order to coordinate and push the military, political and economic integration of Syria and Jordan. The project failed when Syria re-approached Egypt within the Federation of Arab Republics in December 1976
- within the Egyptian-Libyan-Syrian Federation of Arab Republics between Egypt, Libya and Sudan in April 1970. Later Syria joined instead of Sudan, but Egypt and Libya agreed to let a Unified Political Command prepare a more substantial union within the federation. The Egyptian-Libyan merger failed 1973 but on 21 December 1976 and in February 1977 the Syrian president Assad and the Egyptian president Anwar Sadat agreed to form a new bilateral Unified Political Command and a Political Supreme Council. In March 1977 Sudan's president Gaafar Nimeiry joined that Unified Political Command and all three presidents announced to form a new Federation of Arab Republics which never was realized and finally collapsed in November 1977 with the beginning of Egyptian-Israeli peace talks.
- between Syria and Iraq in October 1978 when both sides agreed to improve their military and economical cooperation and even planned to form a Syrian-Iraqi Union. A Supreme Political Authority (Committee) and later also a Joint Political Command was formed with Iraqi president Ahmed Hassan al-Bakr, Syrian president Assad and Iraqi vice president Saddam Hussein. The project failed when Saddam Hussein replaced al-Bakr in July 1979.

== Sources ==
- Robin Leonard Bidwell: Dictionary of Modern Arab History, page 426f. London/New York 1998
- Hanna Batatu: Syria's Peasantry, the Descendants of Its Lesser Rural Notables, and Their Politics, page 282. Princeton 2012
- The News and Courier, 6 June 1965: Despite Alliance, Iraq, UAR Never May Be United
- Toledo Blade, 21 December 1964: Unified Political Command Formed for UAR, Iraq
- The Sydney Morning Herald, 27 January 1965: Mirage In The Middle East
- Spokane Daily Chronicle, 2 August 1972: Egypt, Libya Plan to Join as One State
- The Times, 25 February 1977: Sudan Expetected to Join Egypt, Syria in Command
