= Tasos Vatikiotis =

Greek-American former professional soccer player

Personal information
- Full name: Anastasios Georgiou Vatikiotis
- Date of birth: March 20, 1977 (age 49)
- Place of birth: Fairfax, Virginia, United States
- Height: 1.78 m (5 ft 10 in)
- Positions: Forward; midfielder

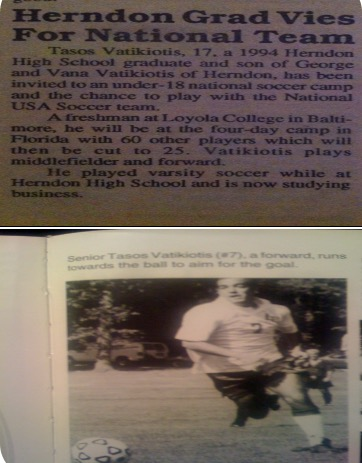
NCAA Division 1 Men's Soccer - pictured: Tasos Vatikiotis (Loyola MD) and Hayden Jones (Princeton)

Anastasios Georgiou Vatikiotis (born March 20, 1977), known as Tasos Vatikiotis, is a Greek-American former professional soccer player who played with Ethnikos Asteras Football Club, a 1st division professional team at the time (1998–1999), in Athens, Greece and USL's Delaware Wizards from 1997–1998, which was D.C. United's farm team at the time. He played at the top 20 nationally ranked soccer program at Loyola University Maryland from 1994 to 1998 where he holds the school record for the fastest goal scored from start of game, at 13 seconds, which is also a top 20 fastest goal scored in NCAA Division 1 Men's soccer history. Prior to college, Vatikiotis played club ball with nationally ranked VISTA Blackwatch and Springfield Nationals where he led both clubs in scoring. He finished the 1993–1994 season as the overall leading goal scorer for both the NCSL's Elite Division 1 League and Virginia's State Cup tournament, which is part of the US Youth Soccer National Championship Series. Vatikiotis was coached, among others, by Michael Brady, Peter Mehlert, Evangelos Stoyas, Bill Sento, Bill Bragg, Rob Olson and Alketas Panagoulias. In his youth and high school days, he also trained and played under John Kerr, Sr., John Kerr, Jr., Bruce Murray and many others for DC based Fairfax Spartans that had recently won the National Amateur Cup. His father, George Vatikiotis, also played an integral part in his overall training growing up. Tasos played attacking central midfield and forward.

- most recent from Washington Post (listed below in references under) while at Loyola "George Mason (5-3) won for the fourth straight time and handed coach Gordon Bradley his 150th career win in 13 seasons. Loyola, which had been ranked among the nation's top 20 teams a week ago, dropped its second straight to fall to 2-2-2. Scott Thelen, Mark Vita and Eduardo Lima scored for the Patriots, while Tasos Vatikiotis scored for Loyola off an assist from Dan Mosny."

== Youth ==
Vatikiotis was born in Fairfax, Virginia and grew up in his hometown Kallipoli, Piraeus in Greece, during his childhood years. He moved to the Washington metropolitan area with his family in 1988.
