= Union of Arab Republics =

Proposed union of countries

- Motto: Waḥda, Ḥurriyya, Ishtirākiyya
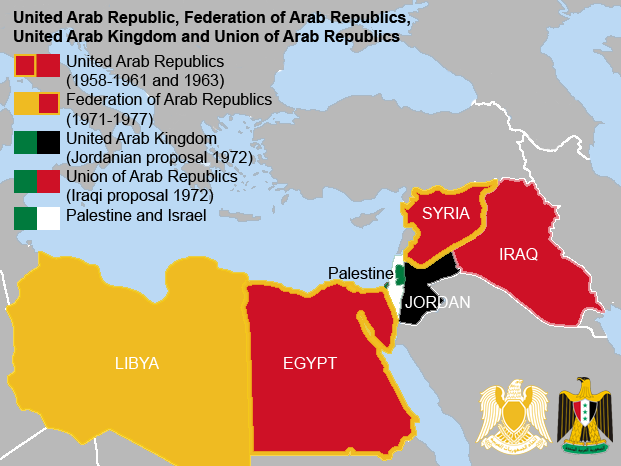
- The 1972 proposed Union of Arab Republics (red) was a new version of the 1963 failed United Arab Republic
- Language: Modern Standard Arabic
- Establishment: Failed proposal

In March 1972, Ba'athist Iraq proposed to Egypt and Ba'athist Syria a re-establishment of the United Arab Republic, which failed in 1961. The Iraqi proposal was an immediate reaction to Jordan's proposal for a United Arab Kingdom but collided with the already established Federation of Arab Republics and failed because of Iraqi–Syrian differences.

== Union of Arab Republics ==
The United Arab Kingdom plan was angrily rejected by the Palestinians, the Arab League and the Islamic States as well as by Israel. The Iraqi counter-proposal urged the inclusion of the Palestine Liberation Organization (to fight united for the liberation of Palestine) in a Union of Arab Republics instead and invited all other "progressive" Arab states to join.

Libya, however, would need to be excluded. At least for the beginning. Iraq accused Libyan prime minister Muammar Gaddafi of inciting Iraqi-Syrian conflicts while Gaddafi condemned the Iraqi regime for its approach to the Soviet Union and the Iraqi communists.

At the end of March 1972, Iraqi vice president Saddam Hussein led a high-ranking delegation to Damascus and Cairo in order to promote the proposal. In Syria, Saddam Hussein met president Hafez al-Assad and foreign minister Abdul Halim Khaddam, but Egypt's president Anwar Sadat had already consulted Gaddafi in Libya. On 26 March, Saddam Hussein met Egyptian vice president Mahmoud Fawzi in Cairo and on 28th he finally met Sadat in Alexandria. Referring to the already established Egyptian-Libyan-Syrian Federation of Arab Republics the proposal was rejected.

However, Syria and Egypt invited Iraq to join the federation instead. According to Khaddam, the first step to unite an Iraqi-Syrian summit should settle the quarrels between the Syrian and the Iraqi Ba'ath parties. In October 1972, Iraqi president Ahmed Hassan al-Bakr agreed to Syria's conditions and proposed to create an Iraqi-Syrian union within the federation while Egypt and Libya had already announced to merge bilaterally in a closer union (also called United Arab Republic) within the federation. Although further discussions were not held, in January 1973, Iraq assured Egypt and Syria its full military and economical support in case of a new war against Israel. Iraq's offer to create a Joint Military Command was rejected however.

== See also ==
- Arab Union
