= P. J. Vatikiotis =

American historian (1928–1997)

Panayiotis Jerasimof Vatikiotis (5 February 1928 – 15 December 1997) was a Greek-American political scientist and historian of the Middle East. He was Professor of Politics at the School of Oriental and African Studies, in London.

Vatikiotis was born in Jerusalem, the son of Paraskevi and Jerasimos Vatikiotis, and grew up in Haifa. He was educated at Greek and English private schools in Mandatory Palestine before he studied at the American University in Cairo and Johns Hopkins University. In the 1960s he moved to London University where he helped get Middle Eastern Studies established. His son is the journalist and writer Michael Vatikiotis. A festschrift was published in his honour in 1993.

== Works ==
- The Egyptian Army in politics; pattern for new nations?, 1961
- Politics and the military in Jordan: a study of the Arab Legion, 1921-1957, 1967
- Egypt since the revolution, 1968
- The modern history of Egypt, 1969. 2nd ed published as The history of Egypt, 1980.
- Conflict in the Middle East, 1971
- (ed.) Revolution in the Middle East, and other case studies, 1972
- Nasser and his generation, 1978
- The modern history of Egypt, 1986. Rev. ed. published as The history of modern Egypt: from Muhammad Ali to Mubarak, 1991
- Islam and the state (original from the University of Michigan; reprint ed.). Routledge. 1991 [1987]. ISBN 9780415057530. OCLC 716235510.
- Among Arabs and Jews: A Personal Experience 1936-1990, 1991
- Popular Autocracy in Greece 1936-1941
