= List of Yemenis =

Notable Yemenis include:

== Yemeni early diaspora ==
- Ghassanids, tribes consisting of more than 50 families that migrated north to the Levant
- Lakhmids
- Banu Judham
- Kindah
- Sakasic, were a Himyarite tribe that settled Northern Egypt around 3rd century AD. They settled the ancient town of Bubastis in Egypt giving it its modern name Zaqaziq after the name of their Yemeni Tribe Sakasic. Also its one of Egypt provinces.
- Banu Quda'a, were a Himyarite tribe that was exiled from Yemen following the trials of the Lakhmids and they settled The Southern part of the Lakhmid Kingdom in the Samawaregion.
- Banu Amela, were the first South Arabian tribe to settle The Southern part of Mt Lebanon later known as Jabal Amil, possibly as early as the 1st millennium BC.
- Banu Muayiya ruled much of northern Arabia and Bahrain. They were mostly affiliated with Himyar and declined after its fall.
- Banu al-Harith, settled in Najran

== Academics and scholars ==
- Amat Al Alim Alsoswa (born 1958), first female journalist Yemen Arab Republic, first female deputy minister, first female ambassador and minister in the Republic of Yemen
- Abdullah Al-Baradouni (1929–1999)
- Muhammad al-Gharsi
- Abu Muhammad Al-hasan Ibn Ahmad Al-hamdani (893–945), geographer, poet, grammarian, historian, and astronomer
- Al Kindi, from Al Kindah tribe of Qaht
- Amna Al-Nasiri, Plastic artist, art critic, writer
- Raufa Hassan al-Sharki, professor, journalist and founder of women's studies program at Sana'a University
- Hoter ben Shlomo (c.1400–c.1480), scholar and philosopher
- Muqbil bin Hadi al-Wadi'i, Muslim cleric, founder of the Dammaj madrasa
- Abd Al Wasi Al Wasii, scholar and historian
- Muhammad ash-Shawkani, Sunni Salafi scholar
- Umar bin Hafiz, Islamic scholar, founder of Dar al-Mustafa in Tarim, Yemen
- Ibn Khaldun (1332–1406), sociologist, philosopher and historian
- Abdul Aziz bin Hars bin Asad Yemeni Tamimi (816–944), Sufi of Junaidia order
- Abu Al Fazal Abdul Wahid Yemeni Tamimi (842–1034), Sufi of Junaidia order

== Athletes ==
- Isra Girgrah (born 1971), Yemeni-born American female five-time world champion
- Nashwan Al-Harazi, gymnast
- Ali Raymi, boxer and colonel in the Yemeni Armed Forces

== Filmmakers ==
- Boushra Almutawakel, photographer
- Yihye Haybi (1911–1977), photographer
- Bader Ben Hirsi, award-winning British Yemeni director and writer, made Yemen's first full-length feature film, A New Day in Old Sana'a
- Khadija al-Salami

== Musicians and dancers ==
- Mohammed Abdu (born 1949), Saudi singer and oud musician, who performs Yemeni traditional music
- Ahmed Alshaiba (born 1990), Yemeni musician and oud player
- Aharon Amram (1939-2025), Israeli singer, composer, poet and researcher
- Yona Atari (1933–2019), Israeli singer and actress
- Arwa (born 1979), Yemeni–Egyptian singer and television host
- Bakar (born 1992), English singer
- Saber Bamatraf, Yemeni pianist, composer and cultural activist.
- Shoshana Damari (1923–2006), Israeli singer
- Dana International (born 1972), Israeli singer
- Inbar Bakal Israeli singer and songwriter, half Yemeni
- Ahmed Fathi (born 1957), musician, composer, and singer
- Balqees Fathi (born 1988), Yemini-Emirati singer and actress
- Zion Golan (born 1955), Israeli singer of Yemenite Jewish origin
- Ofra Haza (1957–2000), Israeli singer of Yemenite Jewish origin
- Boaz Ma'uda (born 1987), Israeli singer and songwriter of Yemenite Jewish origin
- Achinoam Nini (born 1969; better known as Noa), Israeli singer-songwriter, percussionist, poet, composer, and human rights activist of Yemenite Jewish origin
- Margalit Oved (born 1934), American-Israeli dancer and choreographer
- Harel Skaat (born 1981), Israeli singer, half Yemeni
- Ayoob Tarish (born 1942), singer and musician
- Jade Thirlwall (born 1992), English singer, quarter Yemeni

== Writers and journalists ==
- Luai Ahmed (born 1993), Yemen-born Swedish journalist, columnist, and influencer
- Ahmed Baider (born 1993), Yemeni journalist
- Ali Al Bukhaiti (born 1976), Yemeni politician, journalist, and writer
- Saba Hamzah, poet and scholar
- Ramziya al-Iryani, novelist, diplomat and women's rights activist.
- Amal al-Shami (1956–2001), writer
- Sumaya Ali Raja, journalist and first woman presidential candidate for post-revolution Yemen.
- Zahra Rahmat Allah, short story writer and journalist.
- Hind Aleryani, journalist and social activist.
- Azizah Abd Allah Abu Lahum, novelist and women's rights activist.
- Ahmed Fadl Al-Qomandan, poet, writer, and composer
- Arwa Othman, Yemeni writer, journalist, human rights activist and former Minister of Culture

== Entrepreneurs ==
- Mohammed bin Awad bin Laden, founder of the construction conglomerate Saudi Binladin Group and the father of Osama bin Laden
- Salem bin Mahfouz, founder of the National Commercial Bank of Saudi Arabia and the father of Khalid bin Mahfouz

== Social workers and activists ==
- Nujood Ali (born 1998), activist against child brides and forced marriage.
- Amal Basha, considered "Yemen's most famous feminist."
- Jamala al-Baidhani, activist for human and civil rights for women and the disabled.
- Fatima al-Aqel, activist for women with blindness.
- Shada Nasser, attorney for Nujood Ali
- Arwa Othman, Yemeni writer, journalist, human rights activist and former Minister of Culture

== Politicians and leaders ==
=== Historical figures ===
- Sharifa Fatima, Zaydi chief in 15th-century Yemen
- Al-Khayzuran (died 789), wife of the Abbasid Caliph Al-Mahdi and mother of both Caliphs Al-Hadi and the most famous Abbasid Caliph Harun al-Rashid
- Rabiah ibn Mudhar, Jewish king of Himyar
- Abd al-Aziz ibn Musa, played a significant role in the Muslim invasion of the Iberian Peninsula; he was the son of Musa ibn Nusayr
- Musa bin Nusair (640–716), Yemeni Muslim governor and general under the Umayyads
- Dhu Nuwas (515–525), last king of the Himyarite kingdom of Yemen
- Arwa al-Sulayhi (1048–1138), Sulayhid Queen of Yemen

=== Contemporary figures ===
- Miriam Glazer-Ta'asa (born 1929), Israeli Deputy Minister of Education and Culture
- Amat al-Razzak Hammed, former Minister for Social Affairs
- Yassin Abdoh Saeed Noman (1952–2020), Yemeni Nasserist politician, Secretary-General of the Nasserite Democratic Party, and candidate in the 2006 Yemeni presidential election.
- Mohammed Lutf al-Iryani, former Water and Environment Minister
- Abdulwahab Alamrani, diplomat and writer

== Award winners ==
- Reem Al Numery (born 1996), recipient of the International Women of Courage Award.
- Hind Al-Eryani, Arab women of the year award 2017.
- Shatha Altowai, The Scottish Women's Award 2022.
- Tawakkol Karman, Nobel Peace Prize award 2011.
- Arwa Othman, Yemeni writer, journalist, human rights activist and former Minister of Culture

== See also ==
- List of people by nationality
