= Nonie Darwish =

American activist (born 1948)

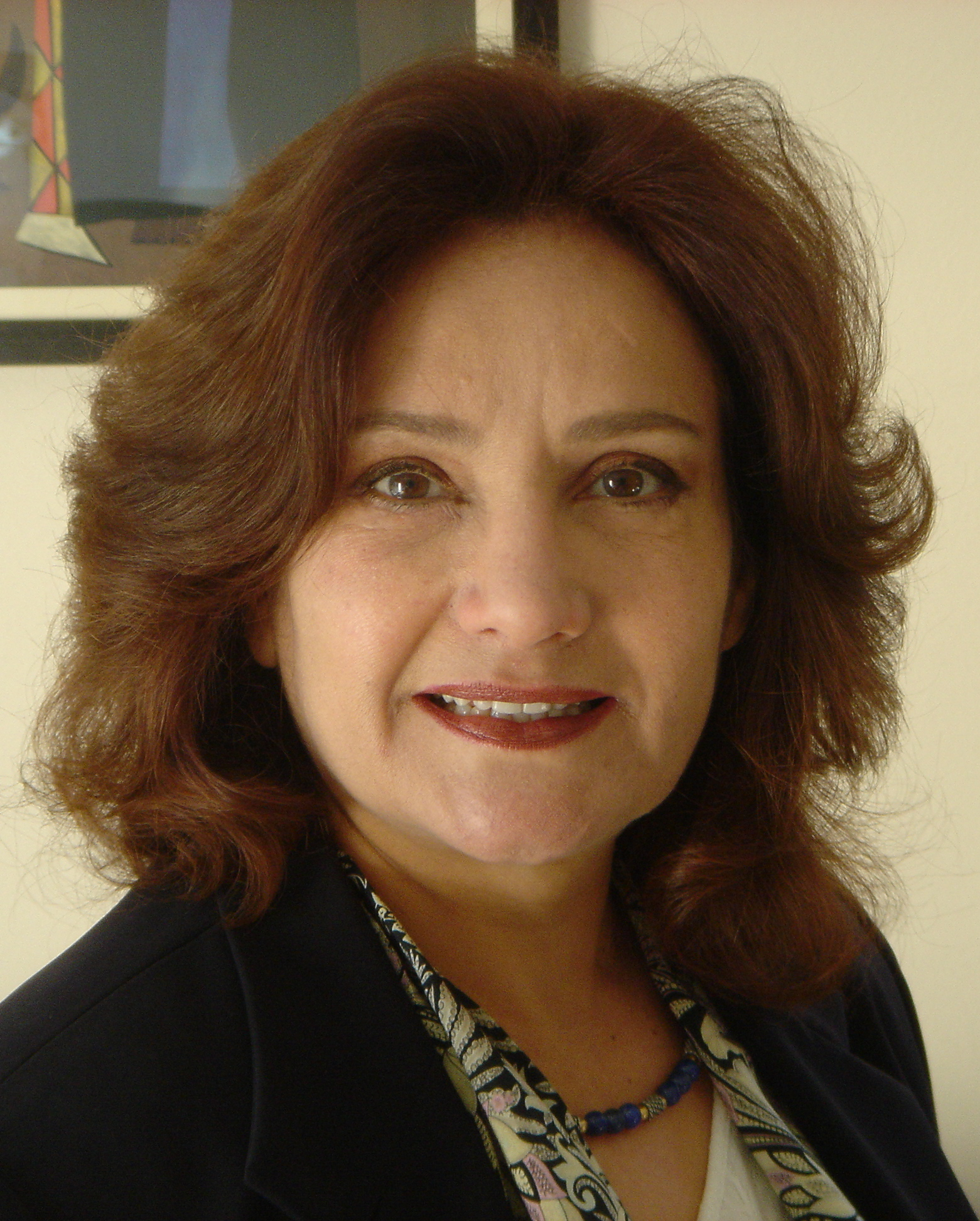
- Darwish in 2005
- Born: Nahid Darwish; 1948 (age 77–78); Cairo, Egypt
- Education: American University in Cairo
- Occupations: Author; writer; public speaker
- Notable work: Now They Call Me Infidel: Why I Renounced Jihad for America, Israel, and the War on Terror (2006)
- Title: Founder and President of Arabs for Israel, Former Muslims United

Nonie Darwish (Arabic: نوني درويش; born Nahid Darwish, 1948) is an Egyptian-American author, writer, founder of the Arabs for Israel movement, and director of Former Muslims United. Darwish is an outspoken critic of Islam. The Southern Poverty Law Center has described her as an anti-Arab and anti-Muslim activist.

== Biography ==
Nonie Darwish was born in 1948 in Cairo, Egypt. Her father, Colonel Mustafa Hafez, was paternally of Turkish ancestry. In the 1950s her Egyptian family moved to Gaza when her father was sent by president Gamal Abdel Nasser to serve as commander of the Egyptian Army Intelligence in Gaza, which was under Egyptian military rule. Hafez founded the fedayeen who launched raids across Israel's southern border, that between 1951 and 1956, killed many Israelis, the majority civilians. In July 1956 when Nonie was six years old, her father was killed by a mail bomb in an operation by the Israel Defense Forces. The assassination was a response to fedayeen attacks, making Darwish's father a shahid. The assassination was planned by Yehoshafat Harkabi. During his speech announcing the nationalization of the Suez Canal, Nasser vowed that all of Egypt would take revenge for Hafez's death. Darwish claims that Nasser asked her and her siblings, "Which one of you will avenge your father's death by killing Jews?"

Darwish is an ex-Muslim and has headed a fringe group called "Former Muslims United", backed by anti-Muslim activist Pamela Geller's American Freedom Defense Initiative.

Darwish is a strong supporter of Israel, and has founded the group Arabs for Israel. She says, "Just because I am pro- Israel does not mean I am anti- Arab, its just that my culture is in desperate need for reformation which must come from within".

== Views on Islam ==
Darwish believes Islam is an authoritarian ideology that is attempting to impose on the world the norms of seventh-century culture of the Arabian Peninsula. She writes that Islam is a "sinister force" that must be resisted and contained. She remarks that it is hard to "comprehend that an entire religion and its culture believes God orders the killing of unbelievers." She claims that Islam and Sharia form a retrograde ideology that adds greatly to the world's stock of misery.

She claims the Qur'an is a text that is "violent, incendiary, and disrespectful" and says that brutalization of women, the persecution of homosexuals, honor killings, the beheading of apostates and the stoning of adulterers come directly out of Islamic texts.

In her book Now They Call Me Infidel, Darwish calls upon America to "get tougher", impose stricter immigration laws especially on Muslim and Arab immigrants, endorse assimilation, and stop "multiculturalism and cultural relativism". She has also called for non-Muslim Americans to be wary of interfaith marriages particularly those where Muslims marry Jewish or Christian women.

Darwish has participated in several conferences and rallies organized by Stop Islamization of America and Stop Islamization of Nations, and has been described as a part of the counter-jihad movement.

== Reception ==
Critics have accused Darwish of operating as part of a "shariah scare industry". According to professor Deepa Kumar, Nonie Darwish has played a role in legitimizing "racist attacks on Muslims and Arabs".

In a 2008 article, Max Blumenthal wrote that Darwish has described Barack Obama as a "political Muslim" and stated that Islam "was not a true religion". At a 2011 hearing on terrorism in New York Darwish suggested that “The education of Arab children is to make killing of certain groups of people not only good, it’s holy,” and was accused by then New York State Senator (and later mayor) Eric Adams of “bringing hate and poison". In 2012, the Southern Poverty Law Center described Darwish as being part of a group of "rabid Islamophobes who promote an array of anti-Muslim conspiracy theories and propaganda". In 2017 the SPLC said Darwish had "made insidious claims including saying Linda Sarsour “wants” to give up her children “to die killing Jews” and that, “she wants to bring Sharia to America.”"

Professor Sahar Aziz describes Darwish as someone who converted from Islam and then allied with anti-Muslim far-right organizations. She writes that while Darwish's views may be sincerely held, she is exploited by Islamophobic right-wing political groups.

In a 2018 journal article, Steven Fink accused Darwish of using her “ex-Muslim insider” status to give herself credibility, as well criticising her for stating that “To be a Muslim is to take an oath of submission to the Sharia state, and that oath prevents you from claiming the human rights that are the priority of any true religion. That is why Islam’s greatest enemies are Christianity and Judaism and nations that are founded on their values” and suggesting Muslims “are incapable of feeling compassion toward non-Muslims. Acknowledging compassion to non-Muslim oppressed minorities is grounds for apostasy. A Muslim must stay hardened and unyielding” with Fink writing: "Worlds apart from acknowledging Muslim Americans as compatriots or fellow human beings, Darwish’s shariah scare industry portrayal transforms Muslims into anti-American automatons."

== Documentary film ==
The creator Paz Schwartz and in collaboration with the director Uriel Sinai, produced a documentary called Nuni Ayuni, which tells the story of her life in the shadow of her father who was eliminated in a targeted attack by the Israeli Mossad. The film brings Darwish together with the Mossad agent who participated in the assassination, and tells of Darvish's disillusionment with extreme Islam, and her transformation into the human rights woman she is today. The film won the best documentary award at the Haifa International Film Festival.

== Published works ==
- Now They Call Me Infidel: Why I Renounced Jihad for America, Israel, and the War on Terror. Sentinel HC. 2006. ISBN 978-1-59523-031-7.
- Cruel and Usual Punishment: The Terrifying Global Implications of Islamic Law. Nashville, Tenn.: Thomas Nelson. 2009. ISBN 978-1-59555-161-0.
- The Devil We Don't Know: The Dark Side of Revolutions in the Middle East. Hoboken, N.J.: John Wiley & Sons. 2012. ISBN 978-1-118-13339-2.
- Wholly Different: Why I Chose Biblical Values Over Islamic Values. Washington, D.C.: Regnery Faith. 2017. ISBN 978-1621575788. OCLC 945232390.

Darwish denies that she is the author of an essay entitled "Joys of Muslim Women" attributed to her in a chain email which began to circulate on the internet in 2009.

== See also ==
- Muslim supporters of Israel
- Luai Ahmed
- Amal Basha
