= YWU =

YWU or ywu may refer to:

- Wumeng Nasu language (ISO 639-3: ywu), a Loloish language spoken by the Yi people of China
- Yemeni Women's Union, a Yemeni non-governmental organization
- Yiwu railway station (China Railway Pinyin code: YWU), a railway station in Jinhua, Zhejiang, China
