= Radhia Ihsan =

Yemeni women's rights activist, Politician and author

- Born: 1933
- Died: 2020 (aged 86–87)
- Education: University of Punjab; Baghdad University; University of Aden
- Occupations: Women's rights activist; politician; author; professor
- Years active: 1950s–2020
- Era: 20th and 21st century
- Employers: Ihsan Allah Hotel; Al-Baath Printing Press; University of Aden
- Organizations: Adeni Women's Club; Yemeni Socialist Party; Arab Women's Association of Aden; Diversified Industries Syndicate in Aden; Council of the Aden Governorate
- Known for: Women's rights activism; political activism; role in the Yemeni Socialist Party
- Political party: Yemeni Socialist Party
- Movement: Women's rights movement in Yemen; Yemeni Liberation Movement
- Opponents: British Colonial Authorities; conservative elements in Yemeni society
- Awards: Honored by Forum for Progress and Progress

Radhia Ihsan (1933–2020), was a Yemeni women's rights activist, Politician (Yemeni Socialist Party) and author.

She went to college in Syria and studied law in Baghdad University, and Islamic studies in University of Punjab in Pakistan. After having completed her education, she returned to Aden, where she was employed as director of Ihsan Allah Hotel, as manager of the Al-Baath Printing Press, and as a professor of Arabic languages and Islamic law at the University of Aden.

She contributed to the Liberation movement against the British colonization, and was arrested and imprisoned twice by the British, but released after a hunger strike.

In the 1950s she became a leading pioneer in the new women's movement in Yemen. In 1956 the Adeni Women's Club engaged in favor of unveiling on the initiative of Radhia Ihsan. Most women still lived secluded in gender segregation and could not appear in public unveiled. When women were stopped from attending the concert of the popular Egyptian singer Farid al-Atrash in Aden, the club on the initiative of Radhia Ihsan arranged a demonstration against the veil – and thus against gender segregation – in Aden. Six unveiled women, followed by about thirty unveiled women by car, attended a procession through the streets of Aden to the office of the news papers al-Ayyam and Fatat al-jazira, were they issued a press statement condemning the veil as a hindrance against the participation of women in public society.

During the People's Democratic Republic of Yemen she held several important posts as a member of the Yemeni Socialist Party. She was a member of the Executive Committee of the Yemeni Socialist Party, General Secretary of the Arab Women's Association of Aden, member of the Diversified Industries Syndicate in Aden, and a member of the Council of the Aden Governorate.

== Honors and awards ==
She was honored at a ceremony commemorating the third anniversary of the founding of the Forum for Progress and Progress. This forum was banned by the Minister of Information at the time, Hassan Ahmed Al-Lawzi. The aim of the ceremony was to honor national cultural, artistic and political symbols to advance culture and highlight the Yemeni cultural heritage.
