= Mustafa Hafez =

Egyptian military official

- مصطفى حافظ
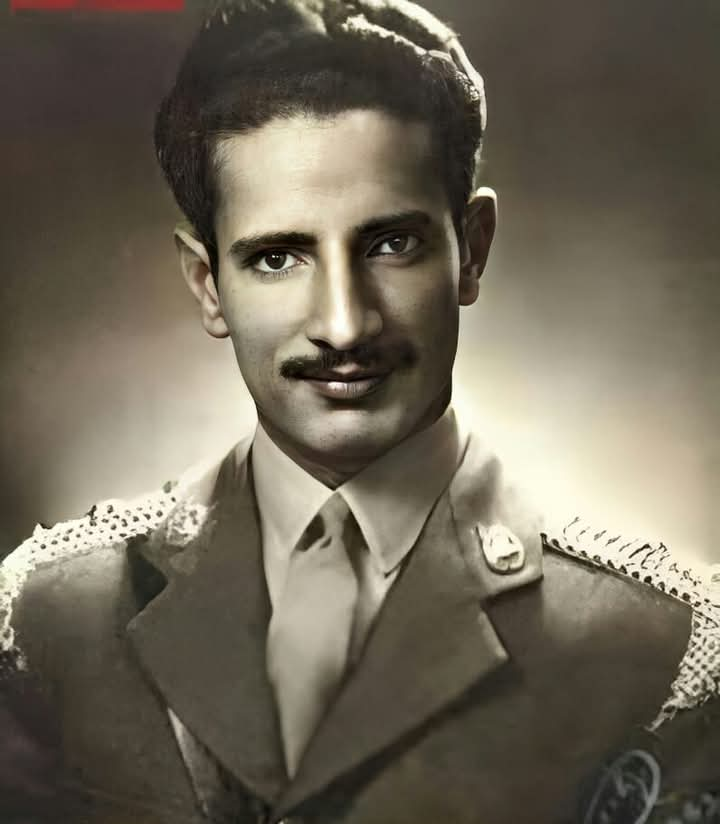
- Mustafa Hafez (1920-1956), Chief of Egyptian Military Intelligence in the Gaza Strip
- Born: 25 December 1920; Zawiyat al-Baqali, al-Shuhada Center, Monufia Governorate
- Died: 11 July 1956 (aged 35); Gaza Strip, All-Palestine Protectorate
- Cause of death: Assassination by bomb
- Burial place: Cairo, Egypt
- Education: Egyptian Military College
- Military career
- Allegiance: Kingdom of Egypt (1940–1953) / Republic of Egypt (1953–1956)
- Branch: Royal Egyptian Army (Cavalry, 1940–1953); Egyptian Army (1953–1956)
- Service years: 1940–1956
- Rank: Colonel
- Commands: Chief of Egyptian Military Intelligence in the Gaza Strip
- Known for: Fedayeen attacks against Israel

Mustafa Hafez (25 December 1920 – 11 July 1956) was an Egyptian military official. As head of Egyptian military intelligence during the Egyptian occupation of the Gaza Strip, Hafez organized fedayeen campaigns that conducted attacks military and civilian targets in southern Israel in the mid-1950s. In 1956, Israel assassinated Hafez with a book bomb, one of the first targeted killings by Israel.

== Biography ==
After the 1948 Palestine War, Egypt occupied Gaza. Col. Mustafa Hafez moved to Gaza with his family in 1952 as chief of Egyptian military intelligence in Gaza.

In July 1952, the Egyptian monarchy was overthrown by the Free Officers Movement. For its support of the revolution, the Egyptian Muslim Brotherhood (EMB) was rewarded with one of its members appointed as the head of Gaza, then a municipality of Egypt. In exchange, the EMB agreed to end cross-border attacks on Israel. However, following an Israeli raid into Gaza in 1955, Egyptian president Gamal Abdel Nasser appointed Hafez to organize raids of commandos, called fedayeen to infiltrate Israel. Fedayeen attack campaigns against military and civilian targets in southern Israel in August 1955 and April 1956 provoked Israeli responses.

Israeli intelligence chief Yehoshafat Harkabi proposed Operation Saris to assassinate Hafez and Lt. Col. Salah Mustafa, the Egyptian military attaché in Amman, who sent fedayeen to infiltrate Israel from Gaza and Jordan, respectively. Hafez was killed at his headquarters in Gaza on 11 July 1956, with a bomb hidden in a book given to him by a Gazan Arab named Muhammad Tallaka, an Israeli double agent. Upon opening the book, Hafez was killed instantly, in one of the earliest targeted killings by Israel. Two days later, a book bomb killed Mustafa. The twin assassinations did not cease the fedayeen activities, which ended only after a full-scale Israeli military operation.

== Personal life ==
Hafez had five children, including activist Nonie. After Hafez's death, the Egyptian military moved the family to Cairo, where Nasser visited the family to offer condolences. Later in life, Nonie moved to the United States, converted to Christianity, and changed her name.

== See also ==
- 2024 Lebanon pager explosions
- List of Israeli assassinations
