= Zahra Rahmat Allah =

Yemeni short story writer

Zahra Rahmat Allah (born 1954) is a Yemeni short story writer. She studied English literature at Aden University and worked at Saba, the state news agency. She was also chief editor of the magazine of the Yemeni Women's Union. Her first book of short stories was titled Bidaya Ukhra (Another Beginning) was published from Sanaa in 1994. Her story "The Secret" won a BBC short story competition in 2007.
