= Delphine Minoui =

French journalist (born 1974)

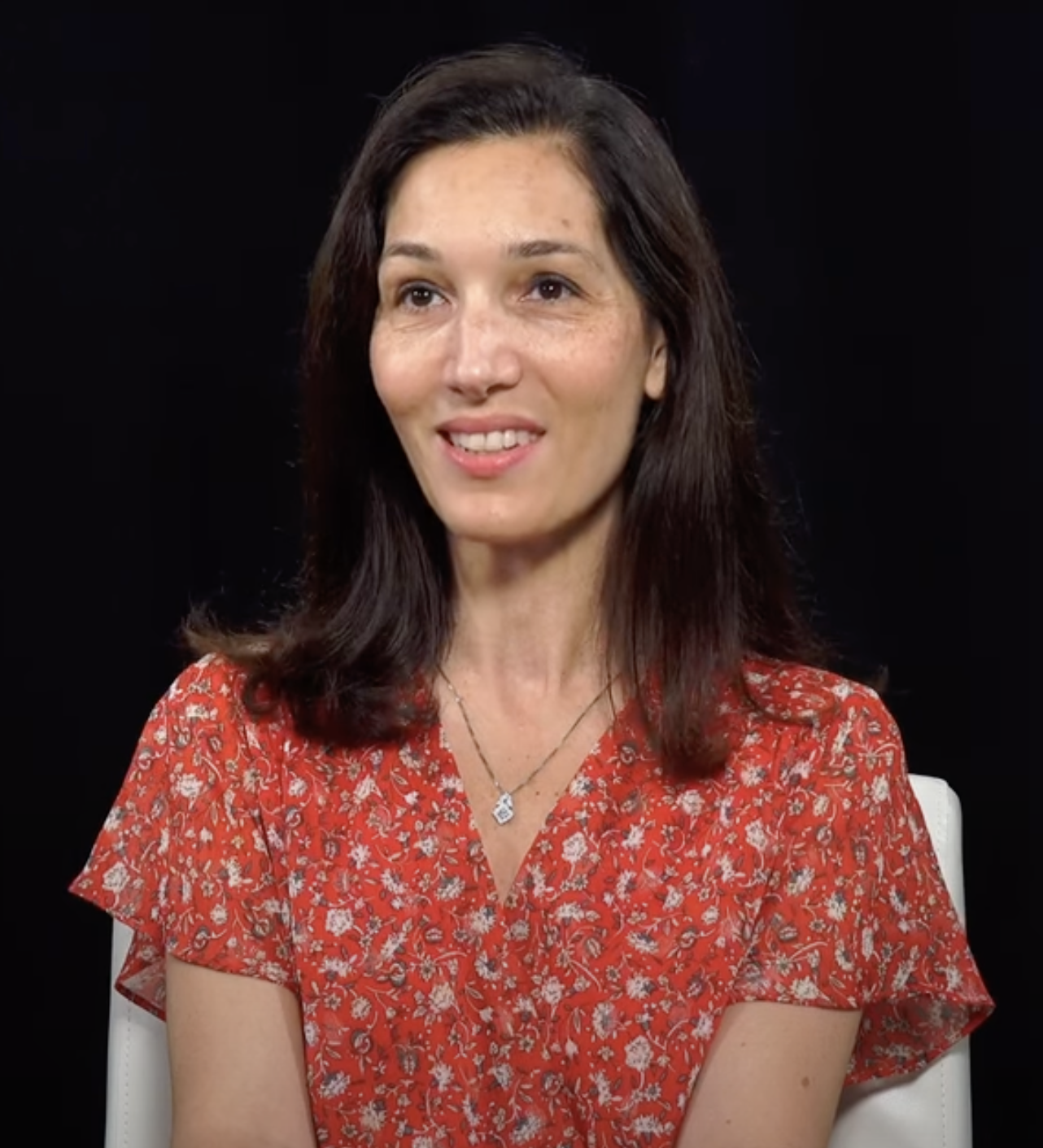
- Born: 1974 (age 51–52); France
- Education: CELSA Paris; École des hautes études en sciences sociales
- Occupation: Journalist
- Writing career
- Notable awards: Albert Londres Prize

Delphine Minoui (born 1974) is a French journalist specializing in the Iranian world.

== Life ==
She majored in journalism at the CELSA Paris in 1997, then graduated from the EHESS in 1999.

Delphine Minoui moved to Iran to practice her profession. A correspondent of France Inter and France Info from 1999, she collaborated from 2002 with Le Figaro. She has also directed and collaborated on several documentaries.

In 2006, Delphine Minoui was awarded the prix Albert Londres for a series of articles on Iraq and Iran.

She recently wrote about Nojoud Ali, the first little girl to get divorced in Yemen.

== Bibliography ==
- 2010: Jeunesse d'Iran; Les Voix du changement. Monde (in French). Paris: Autrement. 2001. p. 221. ISBN 978-2-7467-0103-8. LCCN 2001438000.
- 2007: Demay, Layla; Watrin, Laure. Les Pintades à Téhéran; Chroniques de la vie des Iraniennes. Les Pintades à (in French). Paris: Éditions Jacob-Duvernet. p. 198. ISBN 978-2-84724-155-6. LCCN 2007485179.
- 2009: Demay, Layla; Watrin, Laure (April 2009). Les Pintades à Téhéran; Chroniques de la vie des Iraniennes, leurs adresses, leurs bons plans (in French). Paris: LGF/Le Livre de Poche. p. 280. ISBN 978-2-253-08483-9.
- 2009: Ali, Nojoud; Minoui, Delphine. Moi, Nojoud, 10 ans, divorcée (in French). Paris: Michel Lafon. p. 286. ISBN 9782749909769
  - 2010: Ali, Nojoud; Minoui, Delphine. I Am Nujood, Age 10 and Divorced (in English, trans. Linda Coverdale). New York: Crown Publishing Group / Three Rivers Press. p. 188. ISBN 9780307589675.
- 2005: Tripoliwood (in French). Paris: Éditions Grasset. p. 208. ISBN 978-2-246-79087-7.
- 2015: Je vous écris de Téhéran (in French). Paris: Éditions du Seuil. 2015. p. 317. ISBN 978-2-021-22357-6.
  - 2019: I'm Writing You from Tehran (in English, trans. Emma Ramadan). New York: Farrar, Straus and Giroux. p. 320. ISBN 978-0-374-17522-1.
- 2017: Les passeurs de livres de Daraya: Une bibliothèque secrète en Syrie (in French). Paris: Seuil. p. 160. ISBN 9782021363029.
  - 2020: The Book Collectors: A Band of Syrian Rebels and the Stories That Carried Them Through a War (in English, trans. Lara Vergnaud). New York: Farrar, Straus and Giroux, 2020. p. 208. ISBN 9780374115166.
- 2023: L'Alphabet du silence, Éditions Iconoclaste.
- 2024: Badjens, Seuil. Prix du roman métis des lycéens.
