= Yemeni Women's Association =

Women's organization in North Yemen

Yemeni Women's Association (YWA) was a women's organization in North Yemen. Founded in 1965, as part of the emergence of the women's movement in North Yemen, it merged in 1990 with South Yemen's General Union of Yemeni Women (established 1968) to form the Yemeni Women's Union.

== History ==
In 1955, the World Health Organization founded an institute of nurses in Sanaa staffed by Egyptian and Lebanese women, which was allowed to receive Yemeni women students. This Institute was closed when the women of the institute engaged in women's rights and held a demonstration in 1960 demanding women's rights to study and work. In 1964, an Egyptian mission opened an initiative in Taiz to combat illiteracy among women, which resulted in the organisation of the women's movement in North Yemen in the form of the Yemeni Women's Association in 1965 under the chairmanship of Fatima Owlaqi. It moved to Sanaa under the leadership of Sana Hooria and Moayad Fathiya al-Jirafi in 1967.

North Yemen were much more conservative than South Yemen. In North Yemen, most women lived secluded in harems, and the women's movement did not manage to achieve the same success as in the South. After the fall of the monarchy in 1962, the new regime did little to reform the position of women in society aside from a literacy campaign in 1978 and the introduction of women's suffrage in 1980. The women's movement was met with violent opposition. In 1973, the house of the Yemeni Women's Association in Sanaa was stormed and destroyed by religious fanatics and was not able to open again until 1977 under Raufa Hassan.

On 22 May 1990, South Yemen and North Yemen was united to form the Republic of Yemen. During the Unification of North and South Yemen, women's organizations from both countries were united: the Yemeni Women's Association merged with South Yemen's General Union of Yemeni Women (established 1968) to form the Yemeni Women's Union.
