= General Union of Yemeni Women =

Emblem of the General Union of the Women of Yemen

General Union of Yemeni Women (GUYW) was a women's organization in South Yemen, founded in 1968. It belonged to the National Liberation Front (South Yemen) (NLF) during the regime of People's Democratic Republic of Yemen.

The GUYW had its predecessor in the Adeni Women's Club, which started the women's movement in Yemen. When the People's Democratic Republic of Yemen was founded under the NLF in 1967, the General Union of Yemeni Women was founded as a part of the regime's policy. The purpose of the GUYW was to enforce the official women's policy of the People's Democratic Republic regime, which was a radical and ambitions state feminism.

In 1970, the Socialist regime declared women to be politically, economically and socially equal to men in Article 36 of the Constitution of 1970, and women's suffrage was introduced the same year: this was followed by the new Secular Family Law of 1974. The regime also ensured women's representation among the political candidates of 1977, and launched a five years program in 1981–1985 to benefit the transition of women from housewives to working women.

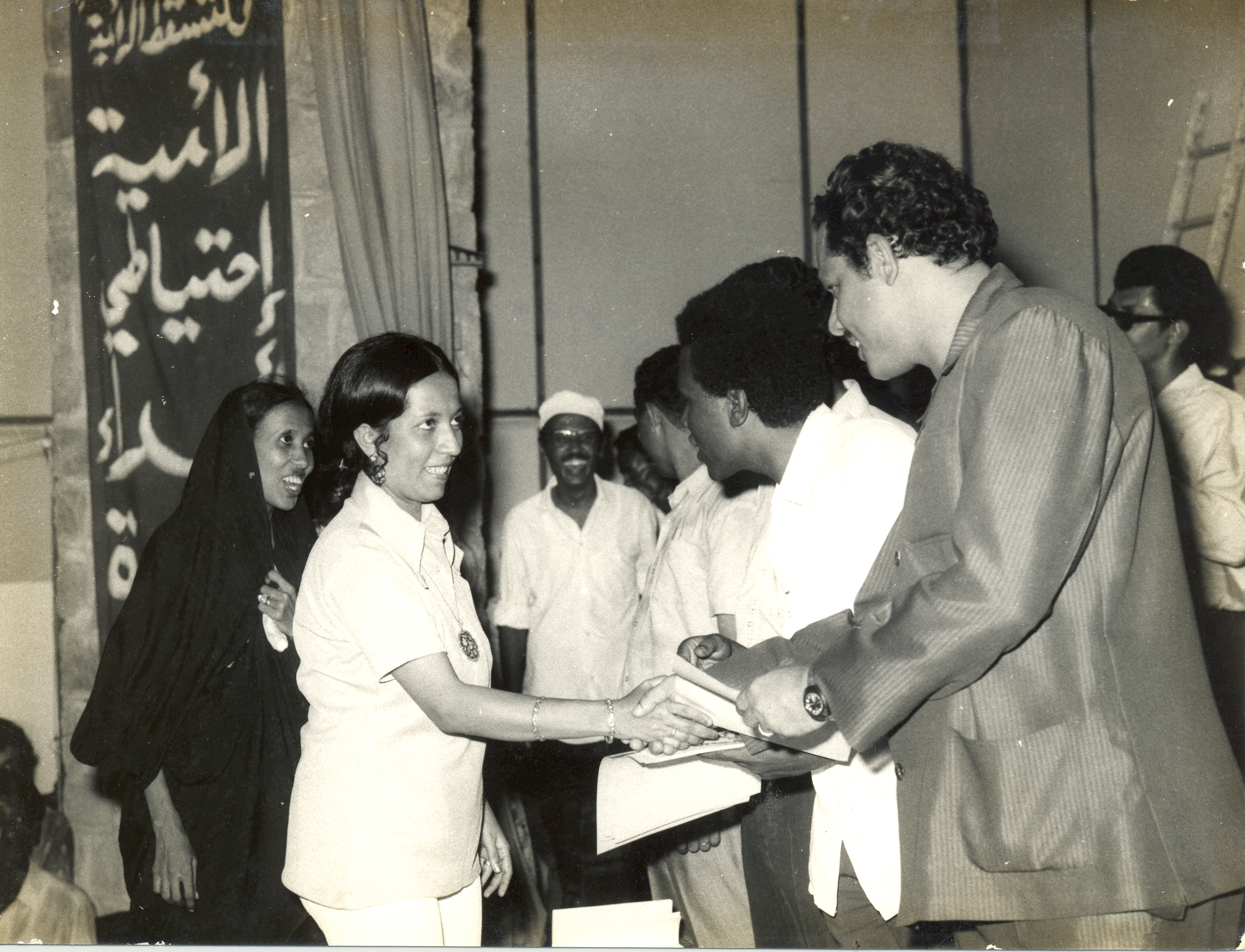
Ali Nasir Muhammad (right) with the head of the General Union of Yemeni Women Fatiha Al-Abdullah (left)

The function of the General Union of Yemeni Women was to inform the public about these reform and enforce them in to reality, and it launched campaigns to encourage women to step forward and take their equal place alongside men. In 1976, the GUYW founded technological women's centers around the country. These centers informed women of their rights and offered professional training, foremost within technology but also in other fields, as well as military and ideological political training. The foremost priority was to combat illiteracy, inform about the secular family law and integrate women to contribute to the country's economy. The General Union of Yemeni Women had some success in the cities, particularly in Aden, but very limited success in the rural areas, were women were often prevented from attending the center by their families, and at least two centers were forced to close.

On 22 May 1990, South Yemen and North Yemen was united to form the Republic of Yemen. During the Unification of North and South Yemen, the women's organizations from both countries, South Yemen's General Union of Yemeni Women of 1968, and North Yemen's Yemeni Women's Association of 1965, was merged to form the Yemeni Women's Union. North Yemen was much more conservative than South Yemen, and the unification resulted in the roll back of most achievements of the women's movement in South Yemen and a deterioration of women's rights, especially in the Family Law of 1992.
