= Adeni Women's Club =

Women's organization in Yemen

Adeni Women's Club was a women's organization in Yemen, founded in 1943. It was the first organisation of women's rights in Yemen, and the beginning of the women's rights movement in Yemen.

In the 1930s, several clubs were founded for men in Aden, but Yemeni women generally lived secluded in purdah in the harems. In 1943, the Adeni Women's Club was founded by the Colonial British Council in an attempt to get the secluded Yemeni women to break gender seclusion and take part in public life. Few Yemeni women were however allowed by their family to attend the club, and initially most members were foreign women such as British, Indian and Persian women: the Persian women were described as the only Muslim women in Yemen at the time to appear unveiled in public.

Initially, the club was simply a social Club. It offered English language lessons, English language films, courses in handicrafts and similar activities. In 1954, Nabiha Hasan Ali became the first Yemeni woman elected President of the club. After this, most members of the club were Yemeni women, and the Adeni Women's Club had transformed from a social club to a political club and active in favor of women's rights. It as the first political women's organisation in Yemen. The Club arranged discussions with male intellectual and clergy to discuss women's rights. It informed women of their rights and spoke in favor of women's right to education and work. It also engaged in anti Colonial work and held lectures and plays which sided with the liberation from colonial rule.

In 1956 the Adeni Women's Club engaged in favor of unveiling on the initiative of Radhia Ihsan. Most women still lived secluded in gender segregation and could not appear in public unveiled. When women were stopped from attending the concert of the popular Egyptian singer Farid al-Atrash in Aden, the club on the initiative of Radhia Ihsan arranged a demonstration against the veil - and thus against gender segregation - in Aden. Six unveiled women, followed by about thirty unveiled women by car, attended a procession through the streets of Aden to the office of the news papers al-Ayyam and Fatat al-jazira, were they issued a press statement condemning the veil as a hindrance against the participation of women in public society.

After the foundation of the People's Democratic Republic of Yemen in 1967, all women's association were banned in favor of the single state women's organisation General Union of Yemeni Women.
