= Palestinian Fedayeen insurgency =

Armed cross-border conflict between Palestinian militants and Israel (1949–1956)

- Part of the Israeli–Palestinian conflict and the Arab–Israeli conflict
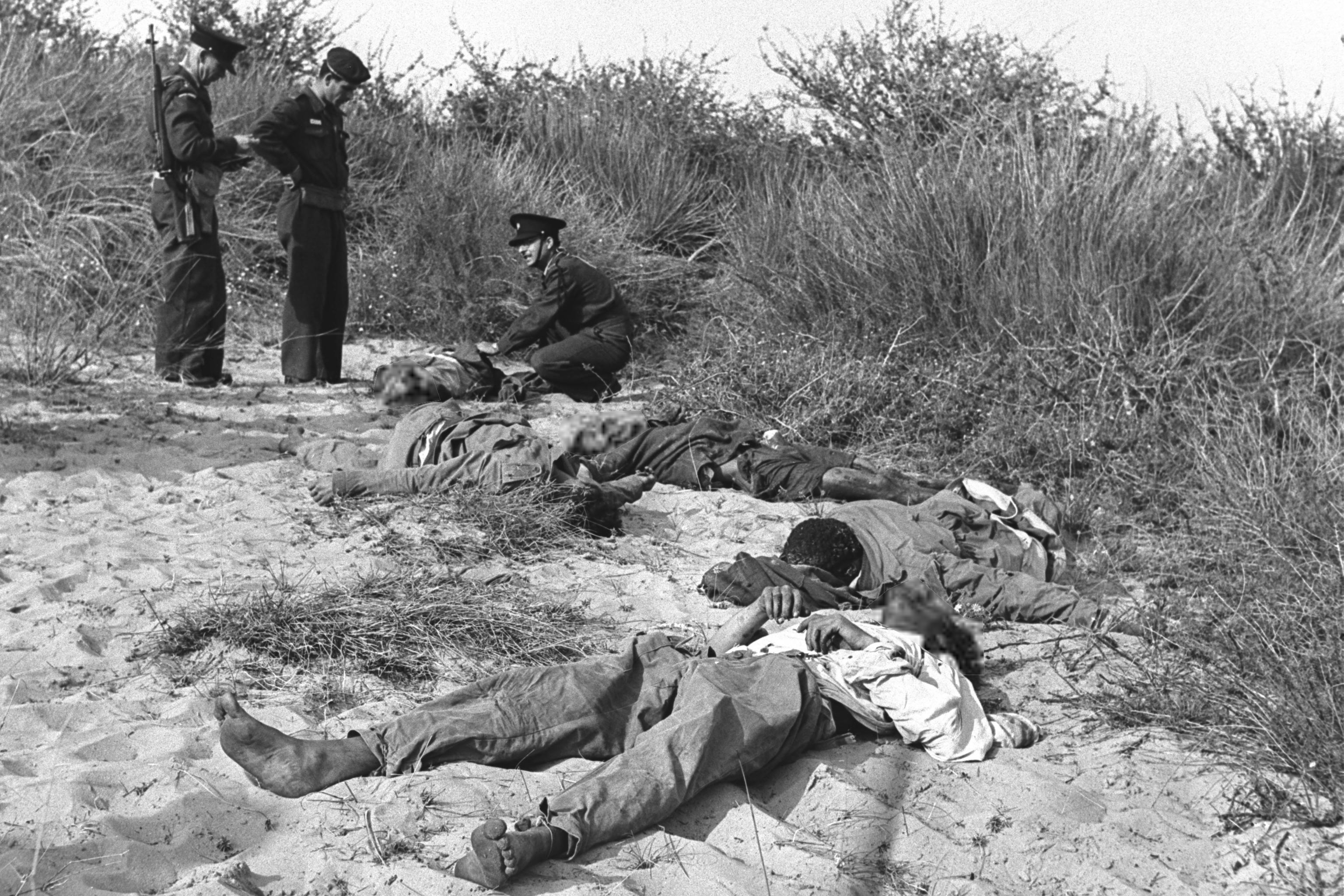
- Israeli policemen inspecting the bodies of five fedayeen killed near Nir Galim, 1956
Date	1949–1956
Location	All-Palestine Protectorate, West Bank and Israel
Result	Inconclusive: Outbreak of the Suez Crisis

Belligerents
Israel	Palestinian Fedayeen Supported by: All-Palestine Protectorate; Kingdom of Egypt (until 1953); Republic of Egypt (from 1953); Syria; Jordan

Casualties and losses
400–967 soldiers and civilians killed (1951–1955)	3,000–5,000 insurgents and civilians killed (1948–1956)

The Palestinian Fedayeen insurgency was an armed cross-border conflict, which peaked between 1949 and 1956, involving Israel and Palestinian militants, mainly based in the Gaza Strip, under the nominal control of the All-Palestine Protectorate – a Palestinian client-state of Egypt declared in October 1948, which became the focal point of the Palestinian fedayeen activity. Hundreds were killed in the course of the conflict, which declined after the 1956 Suez Crisis.

Emerging from among the Palestinian refugees who fled or were expelled from their villages as a result of the 1948 Arab–Israeli War, in the mid-1950s the fedayeen began mounting cross-border operations into Israel from Syria, Egypt and Jordan. The earliest infiltrations were often made in order to access the lands and agricultural products, which Palestinians had lost as a result of the war, later shifting to attacks on Israeli military and civilian targets. Fedayeen attacks were directed on Gaza and Sinai borders with Israel, and as a result Israel undertook retaliatory actions, targeting the fedayeen that also often targeted the citizens of their host countries, which in turn provoked more attacks.

== Background ==
Palestinian infiltration refers to numerous border-crossings by Palestinians, considered illegal by the Israeli authorities, during the first years of Israeli statehood. Most of the people in question were refugees attempting to return to their homes, take back possessions that had been left behind during the war and to gather crops from their former fields and orchards inside the new Israeli state. Between 30,000 and 90,000 Palestinian refugees returned to Israel as a result. Meron Benvenisti states that the fact that the "infiltrators" were for the most part former inhabitants of the land returning for personal, economic and sentimental reasons was suppressed in Israel as it was feared that this may lead to an understanding of their motives and to the justification of their actions.

== Timeline ==
=== Early attacks ===
According to Yeshoshfat Harkabi (former head of Israeli military intelligence), early infiltrations were limited "incursions", initially motivated by economic reasons, such as Palestinians crossing the border into Israel to harvest crops in their former villages. Gradually, they developed into violent robbery and deliberate 'terrorist' attacks as fedayeen replaced the civilians.

The first incursion by Palestinian fedayeen may have been launched from Syrian territory in 1951, though most attacks between 1951 and 1953 were launched from Jordanian-occupied territory.

=== Retribution operations ===
In 1953, Israeli Prime Minister David Ben-Gurion tasked Ariel Sharon, then security chief of the Northern Region, with setting up of a new commando unit, Unit 101, designed to respond to fedayeen infiltrations. After one month of training, "a patrol of the unit that infiltrated into the Gaza Strip as an exercise, encountered Palestinians in al-Bureij refugee camp, opened fire to rescue itself and left behind about 30 killed Arabs and dozens of wounded." In its five-month existence, Unit 101 was also responsible for carrying out the Qibya massacre on the night of 14–15 October 1953, in the Palestinian village of the same name. Cross-border operations by Israel were conducted in both Egypt and Jordan "to 'teach' the Arab leaders that the Israeli government saw them as responsible for these activities, even if they had not directly conducted them." Moshe Dayan felt that retaliatory action by Israel was the only way to convince Arab countries that, for the safety of their own citizens, they should work to stop fedayeen infiltrations. Dayan stated, "We are not able to protect every man, but we can prove that the price for Jewish blood is high."

United Nations reports indicate that between 1949 and 1956, Israel launched more than seventeen raids on Egyptian territory and 31 attacks on Arab towns or military forces.

=== Egypt-sponsored insurgency ===
The terms of the Armistice Agreement restricted Egypt's use and deployment of regular armed forces in the Gaza strip. In keeping with this restriction, the Egyptian Government’s solution was to form a Palestinian para-military police force. The Palestinian Border police was created in December 1952. The Border police were placed under the command of ‘Abd-al-Man’imi ‘Abd-al-Ra’uf, a former Egyptian air brigade commander, member of the Muslim Brotherhood and member of the Revolutionary Council. 250 Palestinian volunteers started training in March 1953, with further volunteers coming forward for training in May and December 1953. Some Border police personnel were attached to the Military Governor’s office, under ‘Abd-al-‘Azim al-Saharti, to guard public installations in the Gaza strip.

From late 1954 onwards, larger scale Fedayeen operations were mounted from Egyptian territory. The Egyptian government supervised the establishment of formal fedayeen groups in Gaza and the northeastern Sinai. General Mustafa Hafez, commander of Egyptian army intelligence, is said to have founded Palestinian fedayeen units "to launch terrorist raids across Israel's southern border," nearly always against civilians. In a speech on 31 August 1955, Egyptian President Nasser said:

Egypt has decided to dispatch her heroes, the disciples of Pharaoh and the sons of Islam and they will cleanse the land of Palestine....There will be no peace on Israel's border because we demand vengeance, and vengeance is Israel's death.

After an Israeli raid on an Egyptian military outpost in Gaza in February 1955, during which 37 Egyptian soldiers were killed, the Egyptian government began to actively sponsor fedayeen raids into Israel.

In 1956, Israeli troops entered Khan Yunis in the Egyptian controlled Gaza Strip, conducting house-to-house searches for Palestinian fedayeen and weaponry. During this operation, 275 Palestinians were killed, with an additional 111 killed in Israeli raids on the Rafah refugee camp. Israel claimed these killings resulted from "refugee resistance", a claim denied by refugees; there were no Israeli casualties.

=== Beersheba - Eilat Road shooting attack ===
The Beersheba - Eilat Road shooting attack was a shooting attack carried out by infiltrators from Jordan. Four Jewish civilians were murdered in the attack. On Monday, 23 April 1956, four Israeli employees of Tahal (the Israel Water Planning Authority) were traveling by vehicle from Ein Yahav to Be’er Menucha as part of their work. While driving along the Beersheba -Eilat road, eight fedayeen militants who infiltrated from Jordan ambushed the vehicle at a section of the road that was in poor condition.

When the driver was forced to slow down, the attackers opened fire on the vehicle. The four occupants were unable to escape or return fire. All four were killed by the gunfire. The vehicle continued traveling for several meters before veering off the road and coming to a stop. The attackers then approached the vehicle, stole weapons and personal belongings, stripped the victims, abused their bodies, and set the car on fire. The burned vehicle was discovered at 10:00 p.m., containing the charred bodies of the four victims. The infiltrators returned to Jordan, leaving tracks behind them.

The victims were Yigal de-Toledo (aged 28), Alexander Vilensky (aged 59), Eliyahu Sukenik (aged 50), and Daniel Ofer (aged 26).

== Aftermath: Suez War ==
Some believe fedayeen attacks contributed to the outbreak of the Suez Crisis; they were cited by Israel as the reason for undertaking the 1956 Sinai Campaign. Others argue that Israel "engineered eve-of-war lies and deceptions.... to give Israel the excuse needed to launch its strike", such as presenting a group of "captured fedayeen" to journalists, who were in fact Israeli soldiers.

== Narrative of the insurgency ==
Dozens of these attacks are today cited by the Israeli government as "Major Arab Terrorist Attacks against Israelis prior to the 1967 Six-Day War".

== Casualties ==
According to Martin Gilbert, between 1951 and 1955, 967 Israelis were killed in what he claims as "Arab terrorist attacks", a figure Benny Morris characterizes as "pure nonsense". Morris explains that Gilbert's fatality figures are "3–5 times higher than the figures given in contemporary Israeli reports" and that they seem to be based on a 1956 speech by David Ben-Gurion in which he uses the word nifga'im to refer to "casualties" in the broad sense of the term (i.e. both dead and wounded).
