= Now They Call Me Infidel =

2006 book by Nonie Darwish

Now They Call Me Infidel: Why I Renounced Jihad for America, Israel, and the War on Terror
- First edition
- Author: Nonie Darwish
- Language: English
- Subject: Islam
- Publisher: Sentinel
- Publication date: 2006
- Pages: 272 pages
- ISBN: 978-1-59523-031-7
- OCLC: 883313534

Now They Call Me Infidel: Why I Renounced Jihad for America, Israel, and the War on Terror is a best-selling book authored by Egyptian-American human rights activist Nonie Darwish. First published by Sentinel in 2006, the book discusses—among other topics—Darwish's change in attitude toward Jews and Israelis, Islamic extremism in the United States and Darwish's trip to Israel. The book has made Darwish "one of the heroines of the Conservative Right."

In a review for the Hoover Institution, author Aaron Mannes says that Now They Call Me Infidel provides support for the claim that "improving the status of women is essential to reform in the Muslim world." In a review for the politically conservative outlet Human Events, Larry Kelley says the "book is a blistering indictment of a misogynistic polygamous world of the supposedly moderate Egyptian society." Jim Hulston, writing in the outlet Electronic Intifada, was generally critical of the book, saying, "as a whole, the book is tedious, predictable, and badly edited—born to be bought, scanned and displayed, not actually read."
