= Reem Al Numery =

Yemeni child rights activist (born 1996)

- ريم النميري
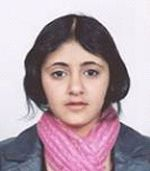
- Reem Al Numery in 2009
- Born: January 1, 1996 (age 30); Yemen
- Occupation: Children's rights activist
- Known for: Resistance to child marriage
- Notable work: Listed in Time's 100 Most Influential People (2010)
- Awards: International Women of Courage Award (2009)

Reem Al Numery (Arabic: ريم النميري; born 1996) is a children's rights activist in Yemen. Known for resisting child marriage, she was honored by U.S. Secretary of State Hillary Clinton on March 11, 2009, with the International Women of Courage Award. She was listed in the Time Magazine 2010 100 Most Influential People in the World.

At age 12, at the end of her school year, Al Numery was forced to marry her 30-year-old cousin. She refused, and was bound and gagged by her father for the ceremony. She described to the U.S. Consul how her husband raped her in order to consummate the marriage. Since her father would not consent for her divorce, a judge ruled she needed to remain married until age of 15. In August 2008, she told reporters: "My dad said he'll kill me for defying him, but I want to go back to school."

After two attempts at suicide and a great deal of international attention she was finally granted a divorce by a Yemeni judge. As of 2010, Al Numery lived with her mother.

Al Numery has been praised on how her "fearless tenacity and unbreakable defiance won her freedom".
