= Raufa Hassan al-Sharki =

Yemeni educator, feminist activist (1958–2011)

- Born: Amatalrauf al-Sharki; 1958; Sana'a, Yemen
- Died: April 27, 2011 (aged 52–53); Cairo
- Citizenship: Yemen
- Education: University of Paris
- Known for: Human rights and women's civil rights activism.

Amatalrauf "Raufa Hassan" al-Sharki (Arabic: رؤوفة حسن; 1958 – April 27, 2011) was an educator, feminist and human rights activist from Yemen. She was a professor of mass media and the director of a Women's Studies Center at the University of Sana'a. Al-Sharki was the first female journalist in Yemen and wrote a regular newspaper column for many years.

== Biography ==
Al-Sharki was born and raised in Sana'a, a town in old sana'a. Al-Sharki's activism started early. When she was twelve, she and seven of her friends walked to the house of the Prime Minister of Yemen, Abdullah al-Kurshumi. Once there, they requested better books for their schools of the same quality as the ones given to boys' schools in Yemen. Al-Kurshmi was impressed with their initiative and allowed them to attend school with boys, marking the first time co-education was permitted in Yemen. Al-Sharki also began working in radio when she was twelve, and this is when she changed her name from Amatalrauf to Raufa Hassan in order to disguise her identity. She did this because while she had the support of her mother in her paid work at the radio, her father would not have supported her. Later, when he found out, he relented and she kept her radio show. While in high school, she was also part of the Yemeni Women's Association (YWA), until it was shut down by religious conservatives in 1973. The YWA provided basic literacy, craft training and radio broadcast training.

Al-Sharki graduated high school in 1975 and went on to Cairo University. She came back from school not wearing a niqab any longer. In 1979, Al-Sharki reopening the YWA in Sana'a. In 1984, al-Sharki began to work with the Information Ministry in Yemen. Later, she received her Ph.D from University of Paris in 1991. In 1993, she ran for Parliament in the country's first democratic elections, though she didn't win.

Al-Sharki founded the Empirical Research and Women's Study Center (ERWS) at Sana'a University in 1996. In 1997, she was providing information about educating young women to various media outlets. In 2000, conservative Islamists who were critical of the center, forced the Yemen government to close the center and Al-Sharki left Yemen for the Netherlands. There had been a fatwa issued on her. She was also personally threatened and her telephone calls were monitored. Later, she returned to Yemen in 2004. She continued her work on the Cultural Development Planning Foundation (CDPF) which she started in the 1990s to support cultural projects in Yemen.

One of her goals was to help "women learn how to vote independently" and she once had the support of the Islamist Party in Yemen, Islah. She helped register women voters in Yemen and helped train women to run for office. Her organizations helped register "thousands of women to vote." She also lobbied for freedom of the press and the need for women's rights. Al-Sharki was very vocal during elections, demanding a quota for women in parliament in Yemen and organizing demonstrations by women for women's civil rights. She believed that the status of women in Yemen could only be improved by creating a Yemeni women's movement. Another problem women faced, according to al-Sharki, was that many political decisions continued to be made by men in a patriarchal tribal system.

One of her projects archived dress codes and information about what political leaders in Yemen wore throughout history. In addition to clothing, she also collected flags and stamps from 1948 through 2004 for her 2005 Exhibition of State Dress and Codes of Identity. She continued to discuss clothing, especially how women wore it through history during seminars.

In 2006, she held the position of the Weissberg Chair and was a visiting professor at Beloit College.

Al-Sharki died in a hospital in Cairo in 2011 from cancer. Al-Sharki's legacy continues to inspire women and men in Yemen. In Sana'a, her sister, Taysir al-Sharki, opened the Raufa Hassan Gallery in honor of her memory.
