= Amal al-Shami =

Yemeni writer

Amal Muhammad 'Ali al-Shami
- Born: 1956
- Died: 2001 (aged 44–45)
- Occupation: Writer

Amal Muhammad 'Ali al-Shami (1956–2001) was a Yemeni writer.

Born in Sana'a, al-Shami was active in many fields during her career; she wrote poetry and short stories as well as screenplays for television and radio. Much of her work was published under various pseudonyms. Her stories often criticized the patriarchal nature of society, and presented education and writing as a means by which independence could be achieved.
