= Nujood Ali =

Central figure in Yemen against child marriage

- Born: June 17, 1998 (age 28)
- Other name: Nojoom
- Known for: Youngest ever divorcée
- Notable work: I Am Nujood, Age 10 and Divorced
- Spouses: Faez Ali Thamer (m. 2008; div. 2008) Unknown (m. 2014)
- Awards: Glamour magazine's Woman of the Year (with Shada Nasser)

Nujood Ali (Arabic: نجود علي, born 1998) is a central figure in Yemen's movement against forced marriage and child marriage. At the age of ten, she obtained a divorce, breaking with the tribal tradition. In November 2008, the U.S. Women's magazine Glamour designated Nujood Ali as Woman of the Year, and associated her lawyer Shada Nasser to the same tribute. Ali's courage was praised by prominent women, including Hillary Clinton and Condoleezza Rice.

Ali's lawyer Shada Nasser, born in 1964, is a feminist and specialist in human rights, whose involvement in Ali's case received much acclaim. Ali has also written a book together with French journalist Delphine Minoui called: I Am Nujood, Age 10 and Divorced.

== Biography ==
Nujood Ali was nine when her parents arranged a marriage to Faez Ali Thamer, a man in his thirties. Regularly beaten by her in-laws and raped by her husband, Ali escaped on April 2, 2008, two months after the wedding. On the advice of her uncle's second wife, she went directly to the Yemeni court, alone, to seek a divorce. After waiting for half a day, she was noticed by a judge, Mohammed al-Għadha, who took it upon himself to give her temporary refuge, and had both her father and husband taken into custody.

Shada Nasser agreed to defend Ali free of charge. For the lawyer, it was the continuation of a struggle that had begun with the opening of her practice in Sana'a in the 1990s as the first Yemeni law office headed by a woman. She built her clientele by offering services to female prisoners.

Yemeni law at the time did not set a minimum age for marriage, and families stipulated in the marriage contract that sex with these young brides was forbidden until an undefined time when they are considered "ready." In court, Nasser argued that Ali’s marriage violated the law, since her husband raped her. Ali rejected the judge's proposal that she resume living with her husband after a break of three to five years. On April 15, 2008, the court granted her a divorce (and 250 dollars of compensation to her now former husband which he had given at the time of marriage for breaking the contract).

After the trial, Ali rejoined her family in a suburb of Sana'a. She returned to school in the fall of 2008, for the first time since her marriage, with plans to become a lawyer. Ali's memoirs, ghostwritten by Delphine Minoui, were published in 2009, and royalties from international sales of the book were intended to pay for her schooling; but she did not attend school regularly. Because of negative world press coverage about Yemen resulting from the case, Ali's passport was confiscated in March 2009, and she was prevented from attending the ceremonies for the Women's World Award in Vienna, Austria. Media reports also questioned whether proceeds from the book were in fact going to the family.

In 2010, Ali's family moved to a new two-story residence bought with the help of her French publisher and running a grocery store on the ground floor of the building. At this time, Ali and her younger sister were attending private school full-time. Because the publishers were not able to pay Ali directly under Yemeni law, they agreed to give $1000 a month to her father until she was 18 to provide for her and her education.

The English-language version of the memoir was published in March 2010. Introducing the work, New York Times op-ed columnist Nicholas Kristof praised the work done to raise awareness regarding such societal problems as terrorism, associated with polygamy and child marriage, saying, "little girls like Nujood may prove more effective than missiles at defeating terrorists." Indeed, publicity surrounding Ali's case is said to have inspired efforts to annul other child marriages, including that of an eight-year-old Saudi girl who was allowed to divorce a middle-aged man in 2009, after her father had forced her to marry him the year before in exchange for about $13,000.

In 2013 Ali reported to the media that her father had forced her out of their home, and has withheld most of the money paid by the publishers. Her father has also arranged a marriage for her younger sister, Haifa. He used the money earmarked for Ali's education to buy two new wives for himself, and, according to haaretz.com, her father sold Haifa into marriage with a much older man. Ali's ex-husband only pays her $30 a month alimony.

As of June 2015, Ali, now sixteen, has unofficially changed her name from Nujood, which means "hidden," to Nojoom, which means "stars in the sky."

According to the Huffington Post, she married in 2014 and now has two girls. Her education was not advanced as originally planned. Her family has been said to have pressured her to demand more money.

== Bibliography ==
2010 - I Am Nujood, Age 10 and Divorced, New York, 2010 (ISBN 978-0307589675)
