= Yihye Haybi =

Israeli photographer

- Born: April 1, 1911; Sana'a, Yemen
- Died: May 21, 1977 (aged 66)
- Education: Taught by colleagues
- Known for: Photography
- Movement: Israeli art

Yihye Haybi (Hebrew: יחיא חייבי; 1911–1977) was a Yemenite photographer of Yemenite Jewish extraction who emigrated to Mandate Palestine and finished his life in Israel. At a time when there were no local photographers in Yemen, Haybi photographed the Jewish community to which he belonged, Europeans he encountered at the Italian medical clinic where he worked, members of the Muslim population, and even the royal family. His photographs offer unique historical and ethnographic glimpses of Sana'a at this time, including the illicit documentation of current events.

== Biography ==
Yihye (Yechiel) Haybi was born in 1911 in Sana'a, what would soon become the capital of an independent Yemen. His parents were Joseph and Zahara Haybi. At the age of 12–13 he studied at the school of Rabbi Yiḥyah Qafiḥ. He helped his father who owned a shop selling salves, oils and creams. At the age of 18 he travelled to relatives in Eritrea. He then went to Italy and later returned to Eritrea. While travelling, he learned Italian and Habashi. He boarded a ship he thought was heading to the Land of Israel but was actually sailing to Hodeda, Yemen. While on the ship, Haybi met consultants, engineers, technicians and foreign doctors travelling to Yemen to work in Sana'a. He became friendly with an Italian physician who asked Haybi to join the staff of a new clinic he was establishing in Sana'a.

At the age of 23, Haybi married Rumiya Hamdi. As customary in Yemen, they lived at his parents home. He worked at the doctor's clinic as a right-hand man and was responsible for ordering materials and medical supplies. He also served as an interpreter between the doctor and the hospital. Over the years, he learned to administer injections and assist in treating patients. The doctor, who had brought photography and darkroom equipment with him, taught Haybi how to take photographs and develop them at a time when photography was illegal in Yemen.

As a member of the Jewish community of Sana'a, Haybi treated his fellow Jews after morning prayer services in addition to working at the clinic. One day, after trying to stop people from attacking a Jewish woman, he was reported to the governor and arrested. Notables of the Jewish community approached the king, who ordered Haybi's immediate release. This incident led to a decision to immigrate to the Land of Israel, at that time a British-ruled territory. Taking his pregnant wife and two children, a daughter, Batya (5) and a son, Aharon (3), the family drove by a cab to Damar. The next day, on donkeys, they continued their way to a Jewish Agency absorption camp. They stayed there seven months awaiting immigration.

During this period, Yihye Haybi was part of a team responsible for distributing food to the camp residents. At last an Israel-bound ship came through the canal to Port Said in Egypt. In 1944, the family travelled by train to the Atlit immigrant camp, where they stayed for a week before being sent to a transit camp in Ramat Hasharon. The camp had no electricity but the families were provided with tents, showers and public services. Haybi found work as an agricultural laborer. After a year and a half, the family was transferred to permanent housing in Ra'anana, where he became a partner in a laundry business.

Haybi died in 1977 at the age of 66.

== Photography career ==
Yihye received two cameras (one of them auto-release) and photographic equipment from his Italian employer in Sana'a, and learned to develop his own prints. As he was the only photographer in the city, many families came to him to have souvenir photographs taken to send to relatives in Palestine.

Once in Mandate Palestine, Yihye did not continue working in photography, but he had brought with him a treasure trove of photographs of Yemen, documenting the people, events, landscapes and markets. He hoped to exhibit his photographic work after retiring, but one month after giving up his job, he died of a heart attack. He was survived by his wife, five children and seven grandchildren. After his death, his widow, Rumiya, published a book of his work, "Sana'a and its surroundings as photographed by Yechiel Haybi".

== Gallery ==
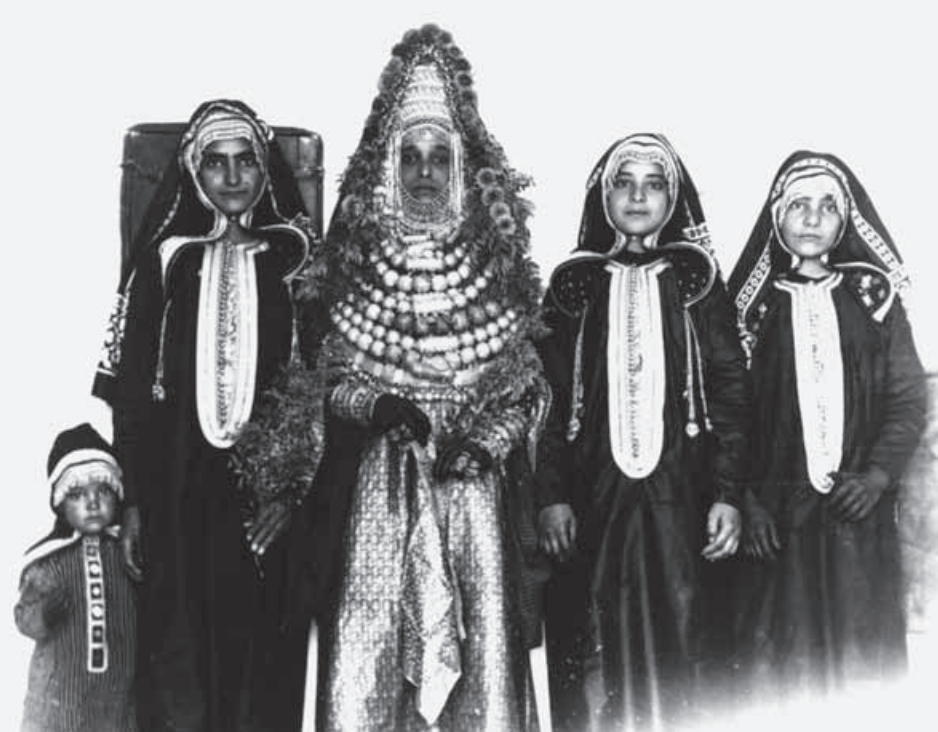
Sanaite Jewish Women, 1936

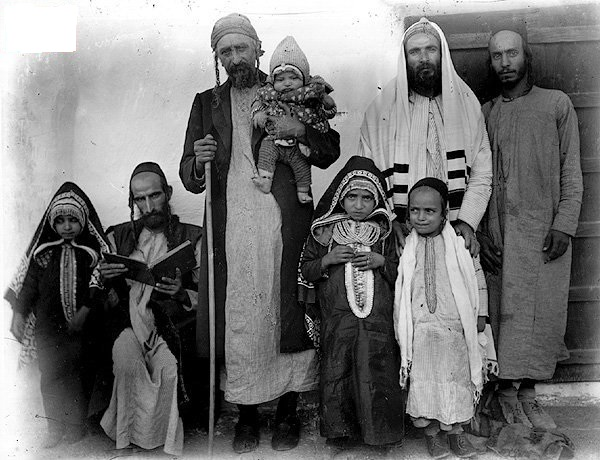
Abraham b. Abraham Yitzhak Halevi holding child in one arm, and holding walking cane, Sana'a Yemen, ca. 1940

== Published works ==
- Sana'a and its surroundings as photographed by Yechiel Haybi, Rumiya Haybi, 1985 (Hebrew) – צנעא וסביבתה בצילומי יחיאל חייבי. Foreword and introduction also in English, 1998.

== Exhibitions ==
- Exhibition – Scenes of Sana'a: Yihye Haybi's Photographs from Yemen, 1930–44, 3 May 2014 – 13 September 2014, Ticho House, Curator: Ester Muchawsky-Schnapper

== Legacy ==
The Yihye Haybi Archives are part of the Photographic Archive of the Isidore and Anne Falk Information Center for Jewish Art and Life, The Israel Museum, Jerusalem.

== See also ==
- Visual arts in Israel
