= Yemeni Women's Union =

- اتحاد نساء اليمن
- Abbreviation: YWU
- Formation: 1990
- Type: Non-governmental organization
- Purpose: humanitarianism and activism for women in Yemen
- Headquarters: Sana'a
- Website: yemeniwomen.org

The Yemeni Women's Union (YWU; Arabic: اتحاد نساء اليمن, romanized: Ittiḥād Nisāʼ al-Yaman) is a non-governmental organization (NGO) founded in 1990. Its purpose is to promote women's civil rights and to empower women in Yemen. The current chairperson of the Yemeni Women's Union is Fathiye Abdullah.

== About ==
The YWU is headquartered in Sana'a and has 22 different branch offices and 132 smaller offices throughout Yemen. Each branch offers women microcredit projects, literacy, health care and vocational training programs. Branches have also conducted legal workshops for women on commercial and tax laws. Other workshops have covered amendments to marriage laws and custody rights for women.

There are about thirty-two staff members and ten "elected volunteers" at the executive office in Sana'a. Many YWU branches include men in their outreach, citing that women's problems in Yemen "cannot be resolved without men's support."

The YWU runs shelters with undisclosed locations to protect women who have fled from violent or abusive family situations. The YWU also runs a hotline which allows women to report domestic abuse so that they can be "transferred to a safe house and assigned an attorney."

Literacy and education are also important to the mission of YWU. The organization manages over 10% of all literacy classes in Yemen and helps raise awareness about the importance of education for women.

The YWU also helped establish the country's first detention center run exclusively by women in 2005 and helped release 450 women from police custody in 2004 and 2005. YWU also helped change a law which did not allow women to be released from prison unless they were "collected by a male guardian."

YWU is also active politically and in religious matters. In 2008, when Muslim clerics issued a fatwa against women running for office, YWU's former chairperson, Ramziya al-Iryani, responded stating that the fatwa was "against Islam, against equality between men and women stipulated by the Quran." Another issue YWU has been involved with politically has been on the question of allowing the use and cultivation of qat.

== History ==
During the unification of North and South Yemen, the women's organizations from both countries were merged. The northern branch had been the Yemeni Women's Association, officially founded in 1965, though it already existed informally under the imamate. In South Yemen the General Union of Yemeni Women (GUYW) was established in 1968, continuing the role of the Arab Women's Club and the Aden Women's Association before independence. The project to merge these groups was supposed to take two months, but instead, it took nearly a year to merge into the Yemeni Women's Union. Some of the difficulties in unifying the groups was due to political differences: the southern branch was Marxist and the northern branch was controlled by women who worked with the Islah Reform Party. It wasn't until 2000 that the political differences between the members of the groups were resolved.

The YWU was led by Amat Al Alim Alsoswa starting before its incorporation, from 1989 to 1991.

In 2013, the combined membership of YWU was estimated at around 4,000 members.

On 26 May 2024, the Southern Transitional Council seized an independent women's shelter run by the YWU in Aden, in what Human Rights Watch called an attempt by the STC to replace independent institutions with STC-affiliated entities. On 23 June, the STC allowed YWU staff to return to their offices, but demanded that they provide half of the building space to the SRC-affiliated South Women's Union, and also demanded that 'Yemen' be removed from the organisation's name and that they only provide support to women from southern Yemen.
