= Shada Nasser =

Yemeni lawyer

- Born: May 1, 1964 (age 62); Aden, Federation of South Arabia (present day Yemen)
- Education: Charles University
- Occupation: Lawyer
- Known for: Nujood Ali's lawyer
- Awards: Glamour magazine's Women of the Year (with Nujood Ali)

Shada Nasser (Arabic: شدا ناصر) (born May 1, 1964, in Aden) is the first female Yemeni lawyer and the first female lawyer to not cover her face in Yemen courts. She studied and acquired a law degree from Charles University in Prague in (1989), after which she returned to Yemen as the North and South were unifying to work as a human rights and defense lawyer. In 1996, she founded an all female law firm with three other female Yemeni lawyers in the capital of Sana'a. She has dedicated her work to protecting the rights of women in Yemen.

== Cases ==
Nasser's clientele includes female prisoners from the Central Prison of Sana'a. In 2005, Nasser defended a young woman prisoner who had been found guilty of murdering her husband despite insufficient evidence and sentenced to death by a firing squad despite being a minor at the age of 16, which Yemeni laws prohibited. The girl had become pregnant in jail after allegedly being raped by a guard in the prison. A presidential order spared the girl's life minutes before she was to be executed.

An opponent of child marriages in Yemen, she represented the 10 year old Nujood Ali in April 2008 as she filed for divorce from a middle-aged man whom her family had married her to the previous year. Ali claimed her husband regularly beat and raped her, despite having agreed to hold off on having sexual relations with her. The court granted Nujood Ali the divorce in a few weeks, which made her the youngest divorcee in the world at the time. Ali's historic case encouraged other young female brides in Yemen to seek divorce.

== Awards ==
In 2008, Glamour magazine designated Nasser and Nujood Ali, whom she had represented in Ali's divorce proceedings, as their Women of the Year and recipients of the Glamour Award for the Voice of the Children.

== See also ==
- First women lawyers around the world
