= Palestinian fedayeen =

Palestinian militants

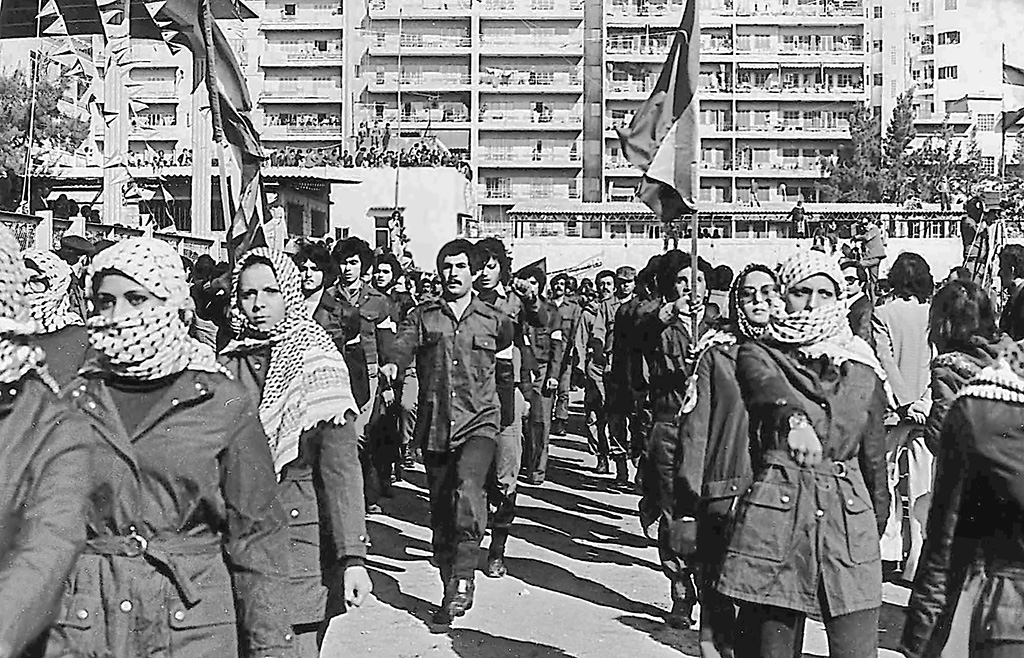
Fedayeen from Fatah in Beirut, Lebanon, 1979

Palestinian fedayeen (Arabic: فدائيون, romanized: fidāʾiyyūn) are militants or guerrillas of a nationalist orientation from among Palestinian Arabs. Most Palestinians consider the fedayeen to be freedom fighters, while most Israelis consider them to be terrorists.

Considered symbols of the Palestinian national movement, the Palestinian fedayeen drew inspiration from guerrilla movements in Vietnam, China, Algeria, and Latin America. The ideology of the Palestinian fedayeen was mainly left-wing nationalist, socialist, or communist, and their proclaimed purpose was to defeat Zionism, claim Palestine and establish it as "a secular, democratic, nonsectarian state". The meaning of secular, democratic, and non-sectarian, however, greatly diverged among fedayeen factions.

Emerging from among the Palestinian refugees who fled or were expelled from their villages as a result of the 1948 Arab–Israeli War, in the mid-1950s the fedayeen began mounting cross-border operations into Israel from Syria, Egypt, and Jordan. Fedayeen attacks were directed on the Gaza and Sinai borders with Israel. As a result, Israel undertook retaliatory actions, targeting the fedayeen while also often targeting the citizens of their host countries, which in turn provoked more attacks. The earliest infiltrations were primarily against civilian targets, however, some infiltrations were against agricultural and military targets. The Gaza Strip, the sole territory of the All-Palestine Protectorate—a Palestinian state declared in October 1948—became the focal point of the Palestinian fedayeen activity.

Fedayeen actions were cited by Israel as one of the reasons for its launching of the Suez Crisis of 1956, the Six-Day War of 1967, and the 1978 and 1982 invasions of Lebanon. Palestinian fedayeen groups were united under the umbrella of the Palestine Liberation Organization after the defeat of the Arab armies in the Six-Day War, though each group retained its own leader and independent armed forces.

== Definitions of the term ==
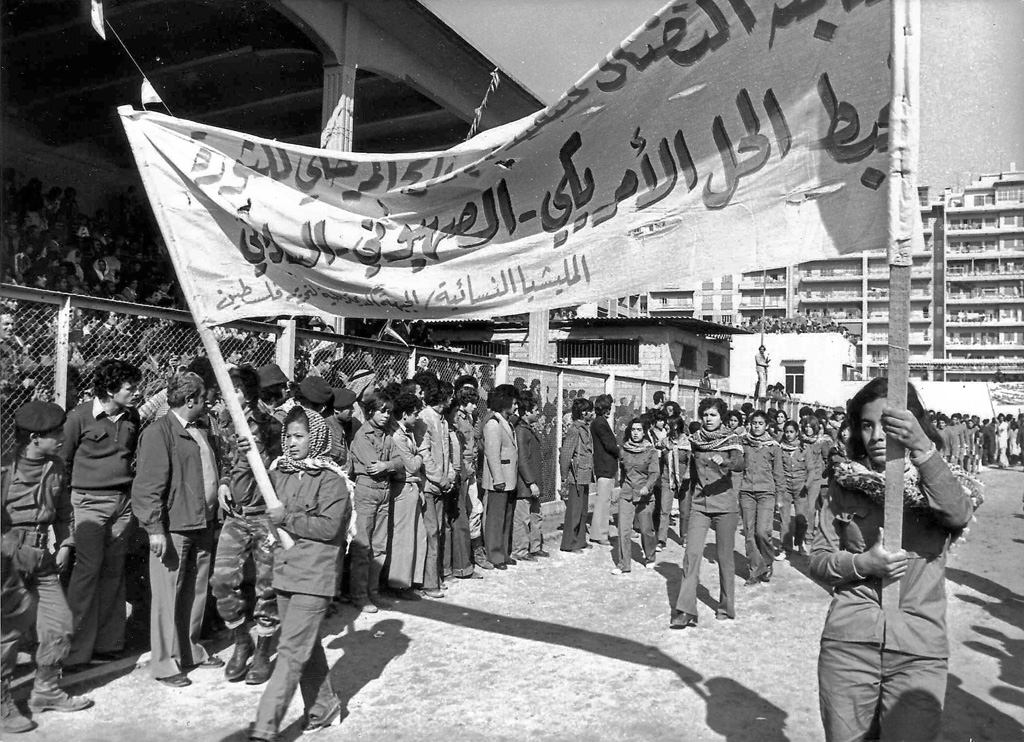
Fedayeen of the Popular Democratic Front for the Liberation of Palestine (PDFLP) in Lebanon

The words "Palestinian" and "fedayeen" have had different meanings to different people at various points in history. According to the Sakhr Arabic-English dictionary, fida'i—the singular form of the plural fedayeen—means "one who risks his life voluntarily" or "one who sacrifices himself". In their book The Arab-Israeli Conflict, Tony Rea and John Wright have adopted this more literal translation, translating the term fedayeen as "self-sacrificers".

In his essay, "The Palestinian Leadership and the American Media: Changing Images, Conflicting Results" (1995), R.S. Zaharna comments on the perceptions and use of the terms "Palestinian" and "fedayeen" in the 1970s, writing:

Palestinian became synonymous with terrorists, skyjackers, commandos, and guerrillas. The term fedayeen was often used but rarely translated. This added to the mysteriousness of Palestinian groups. Fedayeen means "freedom fighter."

Edmund Jan Osmańczyk's Encyclopedia of the United Nations and International Agreements (2002) defines fedayeen as "Palestinian resistance fighters", whereas Martin Gilbert's The Routledge Atlas of the Arab-Israeli Conflict (2005) defines fedayeen as "Palestinian terrorist groups". Robert McNamara refers to the fedayeen simply as "guerrillas", as do Zeev Schiff and Raphael Rothstein in their work Fedayeen: Guerrillas Against Israel (1972). Fedayeen can also be used to refer to militant or guerrilla groups which are not Palestinian. (See Fedayeen for more.)

Beverly Milton-Edwards describes the Palestinian fedayeen as "modern revolutionaries fighting for national liberation, not religious salvation," distinguishing them from mujahaddin (i.e. "fighters of the jihad"). While the fallen soldiers of both mujahaddin and fedayeen are called shahid (i.e. "martyrs") by Palestinians, Milton nevertheless contends that it would be political and religious blasphemy to call the "leftist fighters" of the fedayeen.

== History ==
=== 1948 to 1956 ===
Palestinian immigration into Israel first emerged among the Palestinian refugees of the 1948 Arab–Israeli War, living in camps in Jordan (including the Jordanian-occupied West Bank), Lebanon, Egypt (including the Egyptian All-Palestine Protectorate in Gaza), and Syria. Initially, most infiltrations were economic in nature, with Palestinians crossing the border seeking food or the recovery of property lost in the 1948 war.

Between 1948 and 1955, emigration of Palestinians to the nascent State of Israel was opposed by Arab governments, with the goal being the prevention of escalation into another war. The problem of establishing and guarding the demarcation line separating the All-Palestine Protectorate in Gaza from the Israeli-held Negev area proved vexing, largely due to the presence of over 200,000 Palestinian Arab refugees in the Gaza area. The terms of the armistice agreement restricted Egypt's use and deployment of regular armed forces in the Gaza Strip. In keeping with this restriction, the Egyptian government's solution was to form a Palestinian paramilitary police force. The Palestinian border police was created in December 1952. The border police were placed under the command of Abd-al-Manimi Abd-al-Rauf, a former Egyptian air brigade commander, Muslim Brotherhood member, and Revolutionary Council member. The training of 250 Palestinian volunteers started in March 1953, with further volunteers coming forward for training in May and December. Some border police personnel were attached to the military governor's office under 'Abd-al-'Azim al-Saharti to guard public installations in the Gaza Strip. After an Israeli raid on an Egyptian military outpost in Gaza in February 1955, during which 37 Egyptian soldiers were killed, the Egyptian government began to actively sponsor fedayeen raids into Israel.

The first insurrection by Palestinian fedayeen may have been launched from Syrian territory in 1951, though most attacks between 1951 and 1953 were launched from Jordanian territory. According to Yehoshafat Harkabi, former head of Israeli military intelligence, these early infiltrations were limited "incursions", initially motivated by economic reasons, including the crossing of Palestinians into Israel to harvest crops in their former villages. Gradually, they developed into violent robbery and deliberate terrorist attacks as the fedayeen drew new recruits from the refugee population.

In 1953, Israeli Prime Minister David Ben-Gurion tasked Ariel Sharon, then security chief of the Northern Region, with setting up a new commando unit, Unit 101, designed to respond to fedayeen infiltrations. After one month of training, "a patrol of the unit that infiltrated into the Gaza Strip as an exercise encountered Palestinians in al-Bureij refugee camp, opened fire to rescue itself and left behind about 30 killed Arabs and dozens of wounded." In its five-month existence, Unit 101 was also responsible for carrying out the Qibya massacre on the night of 14–15 October 1953 in the Jordanian village of the same name. Cross-border operations by Israel were conducted in both Egypt and Jordan "to 'teach' the Arab leaders that the Israeli government saw them as responsible for these activities, even if they had not directly conducted them." Moshe Dayan felt that retaliatory action by Israel was the only way to convince Arab countries that, for the safety of their own citizens, they should work to stop fedayeen infiltrations. Dayan stated, "We are not able to protect every man, but we can prove that the price for Jewish blood is high."

According to Martin Gilbert, between 1951 and 1955, 967 Israelis were killed in what he claims were Arab terrorist attacks, a figure Benny Morris characterizes as "pure nonsense". Morris explains that Gilbert's fatality figures are "3-5 times higher than the figures given in contemporary Israeli reports" and that they seem to be based on a 1956 speech by David Ben-Gurion in which he uses the word nifga'im (Hebrew: נפגעים) to refer to "casualties" in the broad sense of the term (i.e., both the dead and the wounded).

According to the Jewish Agency for Israel, between 1951 and 1956, 400 Israelis were killed and 900 wounded in fedayeen attacks. Dozens of these attacks are today cited by the Israeli government as major Arab terrorist attacks against Israelis prior to the 1967 Six-Day War.

United Nations reports indicate that between 1949 and 1956, Israel launched more than seventeen raids on Egyptian territory and 31 attacks on Arab towns or military forces. From late 1954 onwards, larger-scale fedayeen operations were mounted from Egyptian territory. The Egyptian government supervised the formal establishment of fedayeen groups in Gaza and the northeastern Sinai Peninsula. General Mustafa Hafez, commander of Egyptian army intelligence in the mid-1950s, is said to have founded Palestinian fedayeen units "to launch terrorist raids across Israel's southern border," nearly always against civilians. In a speech on 31 August 1955, Egyptian president Gamal Abdel Nasser Hussein said:

Egypt has decided to dispatch her heroes, the disciples of Pharaoh and the sons of Islam, and they will cleanse the land of Palestine... There will be no peace on Israel's border because we demand vengeance, and vengeance is Israel’s death.

In 1955, it is reported that 260 Israeli citizens were killed or wounded in fedayeen terrorist attacks. Some believe fedayeen attacks contributed to the outbreak of the Suez Crisis, and the attacks were cited by Israeli government officials as the reason for undertaking the 1956 Sinai campaign. Others argue that Israel "engineered eve-of-war lies and deceptions.... to give Israel the excuse needed to launch its strike", such as presenting a group of "captured fedayeen" to journalists who were in fact Israeli soldiers.

In 1956, Israeli troops entered Khan Yunis in the Egyptian-controlled Gaza Strip, conducting house-to-house searches for Palestinian fedayeen and weaponry. During the operation, 275 Palestinians were killed, with an additional 111 killed in Israeli raids on the Rafah refugee camp. Israeli officials contended the killings resulted from refugee resistance, which Chomsky claims was denied by the refugees themselves. There were no Israeli casualties in the raids.

=== Suez Crisis ===
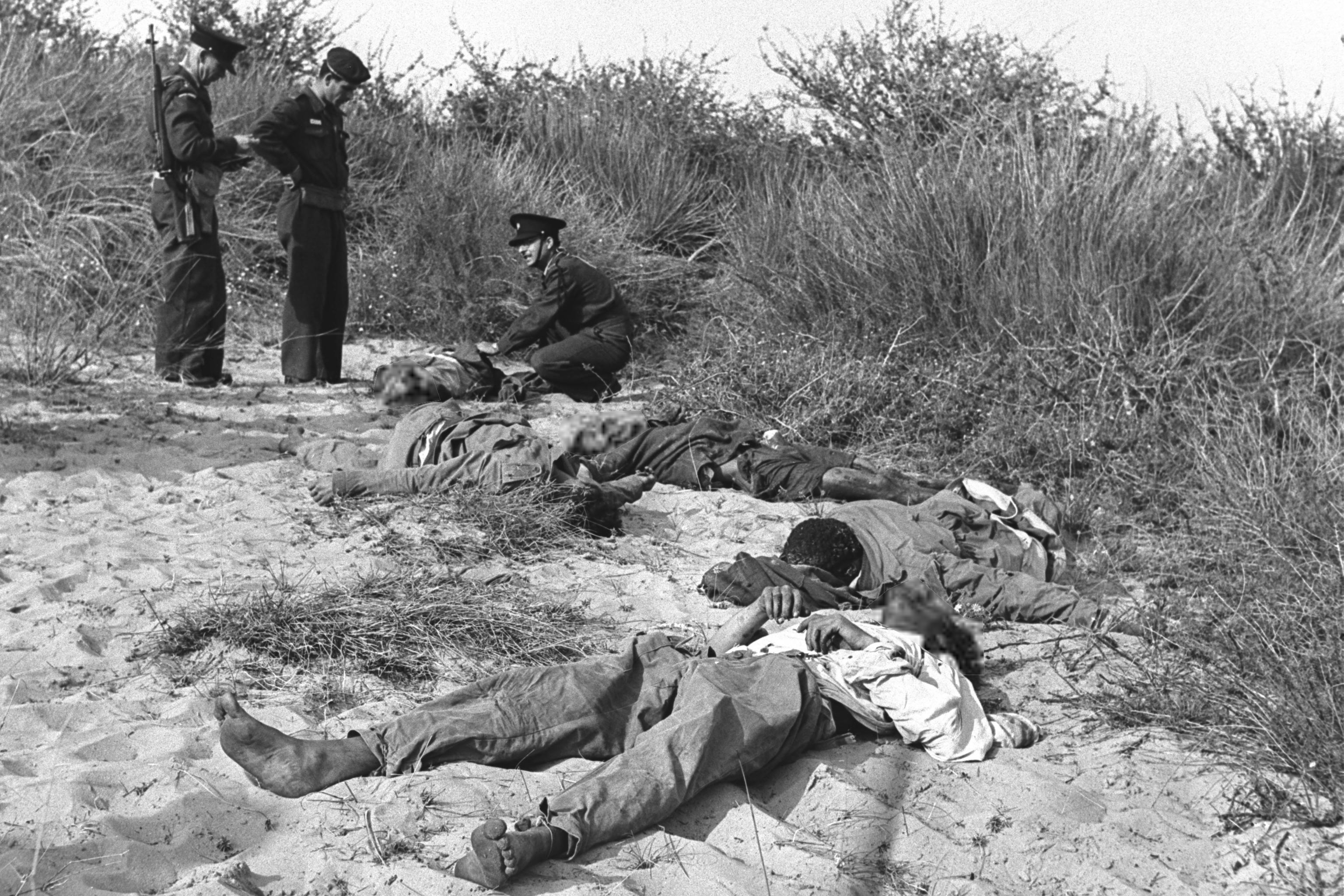
Israeli policemen inspecting the bodies of 5 fedayeen killed near Nir Galim, 1956

On 29 October 1956, the first day of Israel's invasion of the Sinai Peninsula, Israeli forces attacked fedayeen units in the towns of Ras al-Naqb and Kuntilla. Two days later, fedayeen destroyed water pipelines in Kibbutz Ma'ayan along the Lebanese border, and began a campaign of mining in the area, which lasted throughout November. In the first week of November, similar attacks occurred along the Syrian and Jordanian borders, the Jerusalem corridor, and in the Wadi Ara region—although the state armies of both those countries are suspected as the saboteurs. On 9 November, four Israeli soldiers were injured after their vehicle was ambushed by fedayeen near the city of Ramla; several water pipelines and bridges were sabotaged in the Negev.

During the invasion of the Sinai, Israeli forces killed fifty fedayeen on a lorry in Ras Sedr. After Israel took control of the Gaza Strip, dozens of fedayeen were killed: Sixty-six were killed in screening operations in the area, and a US diplomat estimated that of the 500 fedayeen captured by the Israel Defense Forces, about 30 were killed.

=== 1956 to 1967 ===
Between the 1956 war and the 1967 war, Israeli civilian and military casualties on all Arab fronts, inflicted by regular and irregular forces (including those of Palestinian fedayeen), averaged one per month—an estimated total of 132 fatalities, according to Norman Finkelstein.

During the mid- and late 1960s, there emerged a number of independent Palestinian fedayeen groups who sought "the liberation of all Palestine through a Palestinian armed struggle." The first incursion by these fedayeen may have been the 1 January 1965 commando infiltration into Israel to plant explosives, which destroyed a section of pipeline designed to divert water from the Jordan River into Israel. In 1966, the Israeli military attacked the Jordanian-controlled West Bank village of as-Samu in response to Fatah raids against Israel's eastern border, increasing tensions preceding the Six-Day War.

=== 1967 to 1987 ===
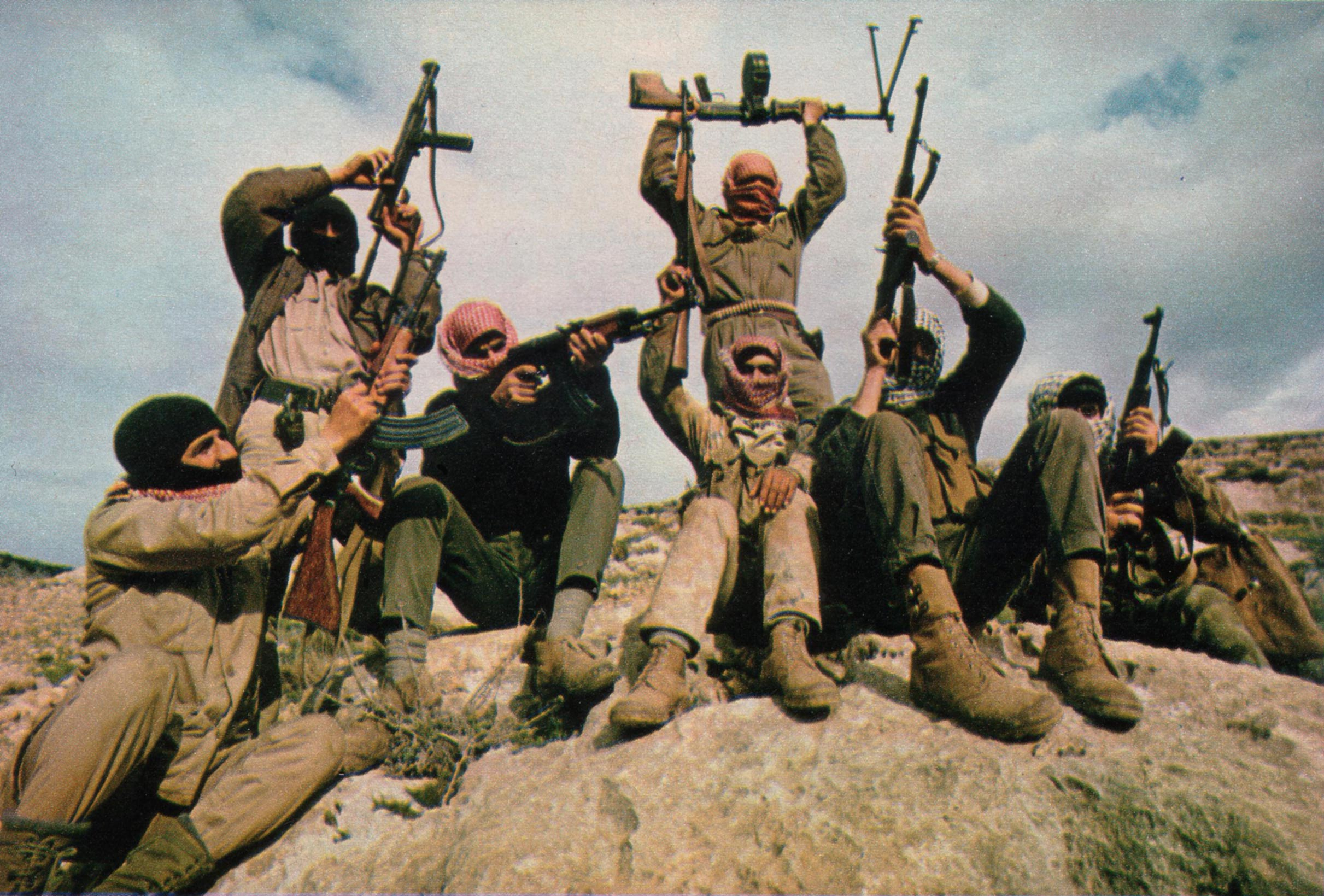
A Popular Front for the Liberation of Palestine patrol unit in Jordan, 1969

Fedayeen groups began joining the Palestine Liberation Organization (PLO) in 1968. While the PLO was the "unifying framework" under which these groups operated, each fedayeen organization had its own leader and armed forces and retained autonomy in operations. Of the dozen or so fedayeen groups under the PLO framework, the most important were the Popular Front for the Liberation of Palestine (PFLP) headed by George Habash; the Democratic Front for the Liberation of Palestine (DFLP) headed by Nayef Hawatmeh; the PFLP-General Command headed by Ahmed Jibril; as-Sa'iqa (affiliated with Syria); and the Arab Liberation Front (backed by Iraq).

The most severe act of sabotage of the fedayeen occurred on 4 July 1969, when a single militant placed three pounds of explosives under the manifold of eight pipelines carrying oil from the Haifa refinery to the dockside. As a result of the explosion, three pipelines were temporarily out of commission and a fire destroyed over 1,500 tons of refined oil.

==== West Bank ====
In the late 1960s, attempts were made to organize fedayeen resistance cells among the refugee population in the West Bank. The stony and empty terrain of the West Bank mountains made the fedayeen easy to spot, and Israeli forces' collective punishment against the families of fighters resulted in the fedayeen being pushed out of the West Bank altogether within a few months. Yasser Arafat reportedly escaped arrest in Ramallah by jumping out a window as Israeli police came in the front door. Without a base in the West Bank and prevented from operating in Syria and Egypt, the fedayeen concentrated in Jordan.

==== Jordan ====
After the influx of a second wave of Palestinian refugees from the 1967 war, fedayeen bases in Jordan began to proliferate, and there were increased fedayeen attacks on Israel. Fedayeen fighters launched ineffective bazooka-shelling attacks on Israeli targets across the Jordan River, while "brisk and indiscriminate" Israeli retaliations destroyed Jordanian villages, farms and installations, causing 100,000 people to flee the Jordan Valley eastward. The increasing ferocity of those Israeli reprisals directed at Jordanians for fedayeen raids into Israel became a growing cause of concern for the Jordanian authorities.

One such Israeli reprisal was in the Jordanian town of Karameh, home to the headquarters of an emerging fedayeen group called Fatah, led by Yasser Arafat. Warned of large-scale Israeli military preparations, many fedayeen groups, including the PFLP and the DFLP, withdrew their forces from the town. Advised by a pro-Fatah Jordanian divisional commander to withdraw his men and headquarters to nearby hills, Arafat refused, stating, "We want to convince the world that there are those in the Arab world who will not withdraw or flee." Fatah remained, and the Jordanian Army agreed to back them if heavy fighting ensued.

On the night of 21 March 1968, Israeli forces attacked Karameh with heavy weaponry, armored vehicles, and fighter jets. Fatah held its ground, surprising the Israeli military. As Israel's forces intensified their campaign, the Jordanian Army became involved, causing the Israelis to retreat to avoid a full-scale war. By the battle's end, 100 Fatah militants had been killed, 100 wounded, and 120–150 captured; Jordanian fatalities were 61 soldiers and civilians and 108 wounded; and Israeli casualties were 28 soldiers killed and 69 wounded. Thirteen Jordanian tanks were destroyed in the battle, while the Israelis lost four tanks, three half-tracks, two armoured cars, and Jordanian forces shot down an airplane.

The Battle of Karameh raised the profile of the fedayeen. Despite the higher Arab death toll, Fatah considered the battle a victory because of the Israeli army's rapid withdrawal. Such developments prompted Rashid Khalidi to dub the Battle of Karameh the "foundation myth" of the Palestinian commando movement, whereby "failure against overwhelming odds [was] brilliantly narrated as [an] heroic triumph."

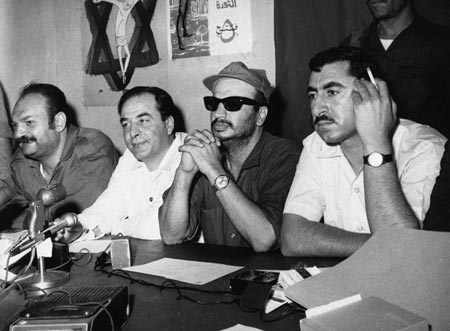
Yasser Arafat (leader of Fatah) and Nayef Hawatmeh (leader of DFLP) at an Amman press conference discussing the situation between the fedayeen and Jordanian authorities, 1970

Financial donations and recruitment increased as many young Arabs, including thousands of non-Palestinians, joined the ranks of the organization. The ruling Hashemite authorities in Jordan grew increasingly alarmed by the PLO's activities as the latter established a "state within a state", providing military education and training and social welfare services to the Palestinian population, bypassing the Jordanian authorities. Palestinian criticism of the poor performance of the Arab Legion, the Jordanian king's army, was an insult to both the king and the regime. Further, many Palestinian fedayeen groups associated with the radical left, such as the PFLP, "called for the overthrow of the Arab monarchies, including the Hashemite regime in Jordan, arguing that this was an essential first step toward the liberation of Palestine," argues Hinchcliffe.

In the first week of September 1970, PFLP forces hijacked three airplanes (British, Swiss, and German) at Dawson's Field in Jordan. To secure the release of the passengers, the demand to free PFLP militants held in European jails was met. After civilians had disembarked, the fedayeen destroyed the airplanes on the tarmac.

==== Black September in Jordan ====
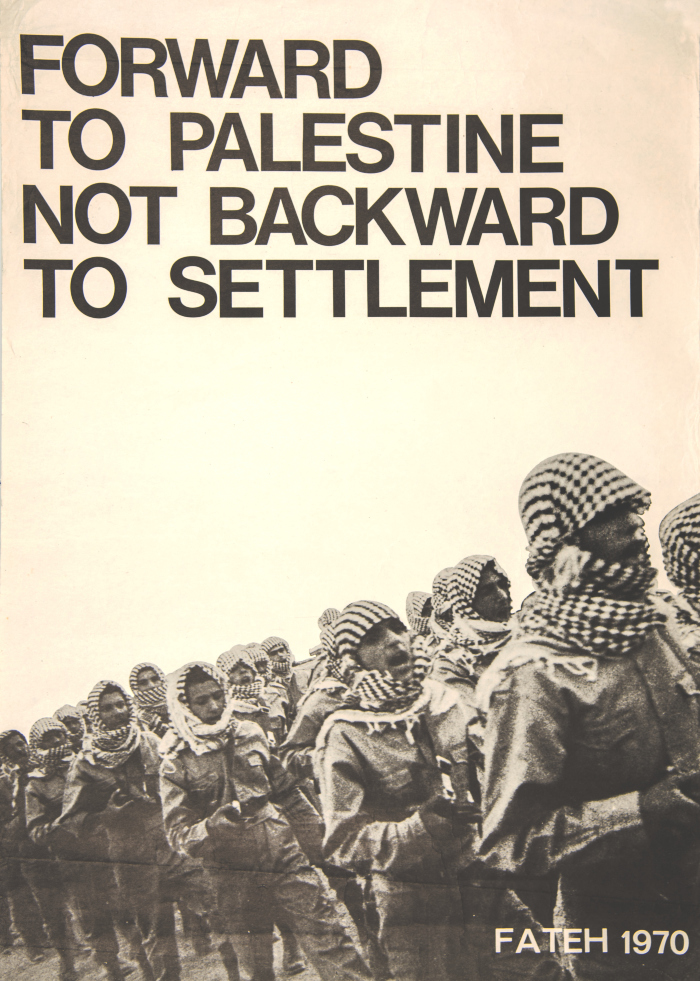
Propagandist poster, created by Fatah in 1970. It says "Forward to Palestine, not backward to settlement."

On 16 September 1970, Hussein of Jordan ordered his troops to strike and eliminate the fedayeen network in Jordan. Syrian troops intervened to support the fedayeen but were turned back by Jordanian armor and Israeli army overflights. Thousands of Palestinians were killed in the initial battle—which came to be known as Black September and thousands more in the security crackdown that followed. By the summer of 1971, the Palestinian fedayeen network in Jordan had been effectively dismantled, with most of the fighters setting up base in southern Lebanon instead.

==== Gaza Strip ====
The emergence of a fedayeen movement in the Gaza Strip was catalyzed by Israel's occupation of the territory during the 1967 Six-Day War. Palestinian fedayeen from Gaza "waged a mini-war" against Israel for three years before the movement was crushed by the Israeli military in 1971 under the orders of then Israeli Defense Minister Ariel Sharon. The fedayeen hid among non-combatants in refugee camps or in the citrus groves of wealthy Gazan landowners, carrying out raids against Israeli soldiers from these sites.

The most active of the fedayeen groups in Gaza was the PFLP, an offshoot of the Arab Nationalist Movement (ANM), which enjoyed popularity among the secularized, socialist population who had come of age during Egyptian president Gamal Abdel Nasser's rule of Gaza. The emergence of armed resistance as the liberation strategy for the Gaza Strip reflected larger ideological changes within the Palestinian national movement toward political violence.

The ideology of armed struggle was, by this time, broadly secular in content; Palestinians were asked to take up arms not as part of a jihad against the infidel but to free the oppressed from the Zionist colonial regime. The vocabulary of liberation was distinctly secular.

The "radical left" dominated the political scene, and the overarching slogan of the time was, "We will liberate Palestine first, then the rest of the Arab world."

During Israel's 1971 military campaign to contain the fedayeen, an estimated 15,000 suspected fighters were arrested and deported to detention camps in Abu Zenima and Abu Rudeis in the Sinai. Dozens of homes were demolished by Israeli forces, rendering hundreds homeless. According to Milton-Edwards, "This security policy successfully instilled terror in the camps and wiped out the fedayeen bases." The destruction of the secular infrastructure paved the way for the rise of Islamism, which began organizing as early as 1969–1970, led by Sheikh Ahmed Yassin.

==== Lebanon ====
On 3 November 1969, the Lebanese government signed the Cairo Agreement, which granted Palestinians the right to launch attacks on Israel from southern Lebanon in coordination with the Lebanese Army. After the expulsion of the Palestinian fedayeen from Jordan and a series of Israeli raids on Lebanon, the Lebanese government granted the PLO the right to defend Palestinian refugee camps there and to possess heavy weaponry. After the outbreak of 1975 Lebanese Civil War, the PLO increasingly began to act once again as a "state within a state". On 11 March 1978, twelve fedayeen led by Dalal Mughrabi infiltrated Israel from the sea and hijacked a bus along the coastal highway, killing 38 civilians in the ensuing gunfight between them and police. Israel invaded southern Lebanon in the 1978 Israel-Lebanon conflict, occupying a 20 kilometres (12 mi)-wide area there to put an end to Palestinian attacks on Israel, but fedayeen rocket strikes on northern Israel continued.

Israeli armoured artillery and infantry forces, supported by air force and naval units, again entered Lebanon on 6 June 1982 in an operation codenamed "Peace for Galilee", encountering fierce resistance from the Palestinian fedayeen there. Israel's occupation of southern Lebanon and its shelling of the capital Beirut in the 1982 Lebanon War eventually forced the Palestinian fedayeen to accept an internationally brokered agreement that moved them out of Lebanon to different places in the Arab world. The headquarters of the PLO was moved out of Lebanon to Tunis at this time. The new PLO headquarters was destroyed during an Israeli airstrike in 1985.

During a September 2, 1982, press conference at the United Nations, Yasser Arafat stated that, "Jesus Christ was the first Palestinian fedayeen who carried his sword along the path on which the Palestinians today carry their cross."

=== First Intifada ===
On 25 November 1987, PFLP-GC launched an attack, in which two fedayeen infiltrated northern Israel from an undisclosed Syrian-controlled area in southern Lebanon with hang gliders. One of them was killed at the border, while the other proceeded to land at an army camp, initially killing a soldier in a passing vehicle, then five more in the camp, before being shot dead. Thomas Friedman wrote that judging by commentary in the Arab world, the raid was seen as a boost to the Palestinian national movement, just as it had seemed to be almost totally eclipsed by the Iran–Iraq War. Palestinians in Gaza began taunting Israeli soldiers, chanting "six to one"; the raid has been noted as a catalyst to the First Intifada.

During the First Intifada, Palestinian armed violence was intended to be minimized in favor of mass demonstrations and acts of civil disobedience, according to Jamal Raji Nassar. Those Palestinian groups affiliated with the PLO and based outside of historic Palestine, such as rebels within Fatah and the PFLP-GC, used the lack of fedayeen operations as their main weapon of criticism against the PLO leadership at the time. The PFLP and DFLP even made a few abortive attempts at fedayeen operations inside Israel. According to Nassar and Roger Heacock,

At least parts of the Palestinian left sacrificed all to the golden calf of armed struggle when measuring the degree of revolutionary commitment by the number of fedayeen operations, instead of focusing on the positions of power they doubtless held inside the Occupied Territories and which were major assets in struggles over a particular political line.

During the First Intifada, but particularly after the signing of the Oslo Accords, the fedayeen steadily lost ground to the emerging forces of the mujaheddin, represented initially and most prominently by Hamas. The fedayeen lost their position as a political force, and the secular Nationalist Movement that had represented the first generation of the Palestinian resistance became instead a symbolic, cultural force that was seen by some as having failed in its duties.

=== Second Intifada and current situation ===
After being dormant for many years, Palestinian fedayeen reactivated their operations during the Second Intifada. In August 2001, ten Palestinian commandos from the DFLP penetrated the electric fences of the fortified army base of Bedolah, killing an Israeli major and two soldiers and wounding seven others. One of the commandos was killed in the firefight. Another was tracked for hours and later shot in the head, while the rest escaped. In Gaza, the attack produced "a sense of euphoria—and nostalgia for the Palestinian fedayeen raids in the early days of the Jewish state". Israel responded by launching airstrikes at the police headquarters in Gaza City, an intelligence building in the central Gaza town of Deir al-Balah, and a police building in the West Bank town of Salfit. Salah Zeidan, head of the DFLP in Gaza, stated of the operation that "It's a classic model—soldier to soldier, gun to gun, face to face [...] Our technical expertise has increased in recent days. So has our courage, and people are going to see that this is a better way to resist the occupation than suicide bombs inside the Jewish state."

The fedayeen have been eclipsed politically by the Palestinian National Authority (PNA), which consists of the major factions of the PLO and Islamist groups, particularly Hamas. Already-strained relations between Hamas and the PNA collapsed entirely when the former took over the Gaza Strip in 2007. Although the fedayeen are leftist and secular, during the 2008–2009 Israel–Gaza conflict, fedayeen groups fought alongside and in coordination with Hamas, even though a number of the factions were previously sworn enemies of them. The al-Aqsa Martyrs Brigades, an armed faction loyal to the Fatah-controlled PNA, undermined Palestinian president Mahmoud Abbas by lobbing rockets into southern Israel in concert with rivals Hamas and the Islamic Jihad. According to researcher Maha Azzam, this symbolized the disintegration of Fatah and the division between the grassroots organization and the current leadership. The PFLP and the Popular Resistance Committees also joined the fighting.

To rival the PNA and increase Palestinian fedayeen cooperation, a Damascus-based coalition composed of representatives of Hamas, Islamic Jihad, the PFLP, as-Sa'iqa, the Palestinian Popular Struggle Front, the Revolutionary Communist Party, and other anti-PNA factions within the PLO, such as Fatah al-Intifada, was established during the Gaza War in 2009.

== Philosophical grounding and objectives ==
The objectives of the fedayeen were articulated in the statements and literature they produced, which were consistent with reference to the aim of destroying Zionism. In 1970, the stated aim of the fedayeen was establishing Palestine as "a secular, democratic, nonsectarian state." Bard O'Neill writes that for some fedayeen groups, the secular aspect of the struggle was "merely a slogan for assuaging world opinion," while others strove "to give the concept meaningful content." Prior to 1974, the fedayeen position was that Jews who renounced Zionism could remain in the Palestinian state to be created. After 1974, the issue became less clear, and there were suggestions that only those Jews who were in Palestine prior to "the Zionist invasion", alternatively placed at 1947 or 1917, would be able to remain.

Bard O'Neill also wrote that the fedayeen attempted to study and borrow from all of the available revolutionary models, but their publications and statements show a particular affinity for the Cuban, Algerian, Vietnamese, and Chinese experiences.

=== Infighting and breakaway movements ===
During the post-Six-Day War era, individual fedayeen movements quarreled over issues about the recognition of Israel, alliances with various Arab states, and ideologies. A faction led by Nayef Hawatmeh and Yasser Abed Rabbo split from PFLP in 1974 because they preferred a Maoist, non-Nasserist approach. This new movement became known as the Democratic Front for the Liberation of Palestine (DFLP). In 1974, the PNC approved the Ten Point Program (drawn up by Arafat and his advisers), and proposed a compromise with the Israelis. The Program called for a Palestinian national authority over every part of "liberated Palestinian territory", which referred to areas captured by Arab forces in the 1948 Arab–Israeli War (present-day Palestinian territories in the West Bank and Gaza Strip). Perceived by some Palestinians as overtures to the United States and concessions to Israel, the program fostered internal discontent, and prompted several of the PLO factions, such as the PFLP, DFLP, as-Sa'iqa, the Arab Liberation Front and the Palestinian Liberation Front, among others, to form a breakaway movement which came to be known as the Rejectionist Front.

During the Lebanese Civil War (1975–1990), the PLO aligned itself with the Communist and Nasserist Lebanese National Movement. Although they were initially backed by Syrian president Hafez al-Assad, when he switched sides in the conflict, the smaller pro-Syrian factions within the Palestinian fedayeen camp, namely as-Sa'iqa and the Popular Front for the Liberation of Palestine - General Command fought against Arafat's Fatah-led PLO. In 1988, after Arafat and al-Assad partially reconciled, Arafat loyalists in the refugee camps of Bourj al-Barajneh and Shatila attempted to force out Fatah al-Intifada—a pro-Syrian Fatah breakaway movement formed by Said al-Muragha in 1983. Instead, al-Muragha's forces overran Arafat loyalists from both camps after bitter fighting in which Fatah al-Intifada received backing from the Lebanese Amal militia.

The PLO and other Palestinian armed movements became increasingly divided after the Oslo Accords in 1993. They were rejected by the PFLP, DFLP, Hamas, and twenty other factions, as well as Palestinian intellectuals, refugees outside of the Palestinian territories, and the local leadership of the territories. The Rejectionist fedayeen factions formed a common front with the Islamists, culminating in the creation of the Alliance of Palestinian Forces. This new alliance failed to act as a cohesive unit, but revealed the sharp divisions among the PLO, with the fedayeen finding themselves aligning with Palestinian Islamists for the first time. Disintegration within the PLO's main body, Fatah, increased as Farouk Qaddoumi—in charge of foreign affairs—voiced his opposition to negotiations with Israel. Members of the PLO-Executive Committee, poet Mahmoud Darwish and refugee leader Shafiq al-Hout resigned from their posts in response to the PLO's acceptance of Oslo's terms.

=== Tactics ===
Until 1968, fedayeen tactics consisted largely of hit-and-run raids on Israeli military targets. A commitment to "armed struggle" was incorporated into PLO Charter in clauses that stated: "Armed struggle is the only way to liberate Palestine" and "Commando action constitutes the nucleus of the Palestinian popular liberation war."

Preceding the Six-Day War in 1967, the fedayeen carried out several campaigns of sabotage against Israeli infrastructure. Common acts of this included the consistent mining of water and irrigation pipelines along the Jordan River and its tributaries, as well as the Lebanese-Israeli border and in various locations in the Galilee. Other acts of sabotage involved bombing bridges, mining roads, ambushing cars, and vandalizing (sometimes destroying) houses. After the Six-Day War, these incidents steadily decreased, with the exception of the bombing of a complex of oil pipelines sourcing from the Haifa refinery in 1969.

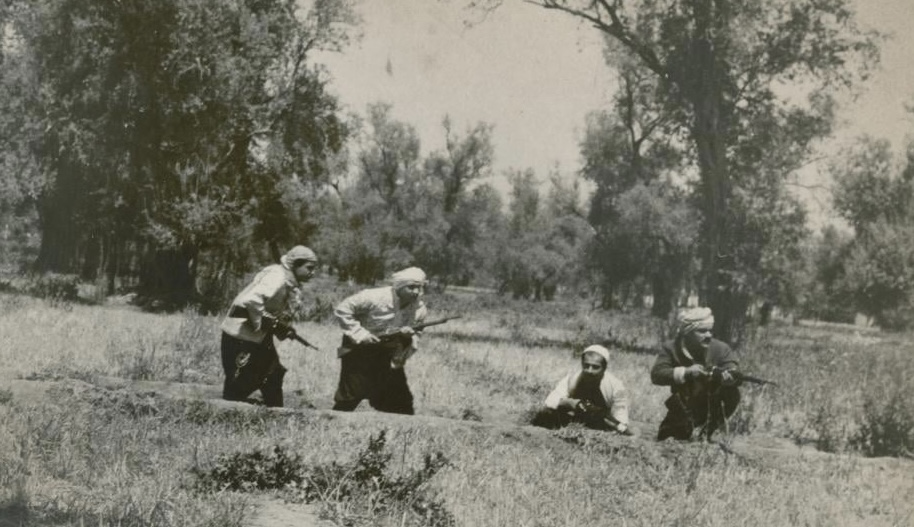
Fedayeen training in Syria, 1980s

The IDF's counterinsurgency tactics, which from 1967 onwards regularly included the use of home demolitions, curfews, deportations, and other forms of collective punishment, effectively precluded the ability of the Palestinian fedayeen to create internal bases from which to wage "a people's war". The tendency among many captured guerrillas to collaborate with the Israeli authorities, providing information that led to the destruction of numerous "terrorist cells", also contributed to the failure to establish bases in the Israeli-occupied territories. The fedayeen were compelled to establish external bases, resulting in frictions with their host countries which led to conflicts (such as Black September), diverting them from their primary objective of "bleeding Israel".

==== Airplane hijackings ====
The tactic of exporting their struggle against Israel beyond the Middle East was first adopted by the Palestinian fedayeen in 1968. According to John Follain, it was Wadie Haddad of the PFLP who, unconvinced with the effectiveness of raids on military targets, masterminded the first hijacking of a civilian passenger plane by Palestinian fedayeen in July 1968. Two commandos forced an El Al Boeing 747 en route from Rome to Tel Aviv to land in Algiers, renaming the flight "Palestinian Liberation 007". While publicly proclaiming that it would not negotiate with terrorists, the Israelis did negotiate. The passengers were released unharmed in exchange for the release of sixteen Palestinian prisoners in Israeli jails. The PFLP conducted the first hijacking of an American airliner on 29 August 1969. Robert D. Kumamoto describes the hijacking as a response to an American veto of a United Nations Security Council resolution censuring Israel for its March 1969 aerial attacks on Jordanian villages suspected of harbouring fedayeen, and for the impending delivery of American Phantom jets to Israel. The flight, en route to Tel Aviv from Rome, was forced to land in Damascus, where Leila Khaled, one of the two fedayeen to hijack the plane, proclaimed that, "this hijacking is one of the operational aspects of our war against Zionism and all who support it, including the United States ...[;] it was a perfectly normal thing to do, the sort of thing all freedom fighters must tackle." Most of the passengers and crew were released immediately after the plane landed. Six Israeli passengers were taken hostage and held for questioning by Syria. Four women were released after two days, and the two men were released after a week of intensive negotiations between all the parties involved. Of this PFLP hijacking and those that followed at Dawson's field, Kumamoto writes: "The PFLP hijackers had seized no armies, mountaintops, or cities. Theirs was not necessarily a war of arms; it was a war of words – a war of propaganda, the exploitation of violence to attract world attention. In that regard, the Dawson's Field episode was a publicity goldmine."

George Habash, leader of the PFLP, explained his view of the efficacy of hijacking as a tactic in a 1970 interview, stating, "When we hijack a plane, it has more effect than if we killed a hundred Israelis in battle." After decades of being ignored, Habash also noted, "At least the world is talking about us now." The hijacking attempts did indeed continue. On 8 May 1972, a Sabena Airlines 707 was forced to land in Tel Aviv after it was commandeered by four Black September commandos who demanded the release of 317 fedayeen fighters being held in Israeli jails. While the Red Cross was negotiating, Israeli paratroopers disguised as mechanics stormed the plane, shot and killed two of the hijackers, and captured the remaining two after a gunfight that injured five passengers and two paratroopers.

The tactics the Black September group employed in subsequent operations differed sharply from the other "run-of-the-mill PLO attacks of the day". The unprecedented level of violence evident in multiple international attacks between 1971 and 1972 included the Sabena airliner hijacking (mentioned above), the assassination of the Jordanian Prime Minister in Cairo, the Massacre at Lod airport, and the Munich Olympics massacre. In The Dynamics of Armed Struggle, J. Bowyer Bell contends that "armed struggle" is a message to the enemy that they are "doomed by history" and that operations are "violent message units" designed to "accelerate history" to this end. Bell argues that despite the apparent failure of the Munich operation which collapsed into chaos, murder, and gun battles, the basic fedayeen intention was achieved since, "The West was appalled and wanted to know the rationale of the terrorists, the Israelis were outraged and punished, many of the Palestinians were encouraged by the visibility and ignored the killings, and the rebels felt that they had acted, helped history along." He notes the opposite was true for the 1976 hijacking of an Air France flight redirected to Uganda where the Israelis scored an "enormous tactical victory" in Operation Entebbe. While their death as martyrs had been foreseen, the fedayeen had not expected to die as villains, "bested by a display of Zionist skill."

==== Affiliations with other guerrilla groups ====
Several fedayeen groups maintained contacts with a number of other guerrilla groups worldwide. The IRA, for example, had long held ties with Palestinians, and volunteers trained at fedayeen bases in Lebanon. In 1977, Palestinian fedayeen from Fatah helped arrange for the delivery of a sizable arms shipment to the Provos by way of Cyprus, but it was intercepted by the Belgian authorities.

The PFLP and the DFLP established connections with revolutionary groups such as the Red Army Faction of West Germany, the Action Directe of France, the Red Brigades of Italy, the Japanese Red Army and the Tupamaros of Uruguay. These groups, especially the Japanese Red Army, participated in many of the PFLP's operations, including hijackings and the Lod Airport massacre. The Red Army Faction joined the PFLP in the hijackings of two airplanes that landed in Entebbe Airport.

== See also ==
- Egypt–Israel peace treaty
- History of the Israeli–Palestinian conflict
- Israeli casualties of war
- Israeli–Palestinian peace process
- Occupation of the Gaza Strip by Egypt
- Palestinian casualties of war
- Palestinian immigration (Israel)
- Palestinian political violence
- Reprisal operations (Israel)
