= Abd Al Wasi Al Wasii =

Yemeni Islamic scholar and historian

- Born: May 1878; Sana'a, Yemen
- Died: January 1960, 81-82 years old
- Citizenship: Ottoman Empire (1878–1918) The Mutawakkilite Kingdom of Yemen(1918–1960)
- Occupations: Muslim scholar, jurist, historian, and teacher

Abd al-Was’i bin Yahya bin Hussein al-Wasa’i al-Yamani (Arabic:عبد الواسع الواسعي)(May 1878 – January 1960) was a Muslim scholar, Zaidi jurist and Yemeni Islamic historian. He was born and raised in Sana'a. He received his knowledge there, then left for Mecca and took from its scholars. He made many trips, visiting most countries of the Islamic world, such as India, Iraq, Egypt, the Levant, and others. He was in Damascus when the First General War and the Battle of Damascus broke out, and he lived there for five years. Then he returned to his homeland and went on to teach at the Sana'a Mosque and at the Scientific School. He contributed to the publication of many Yemeni books and the definition of Yemen and its heritage, and he has many books, the most famous of which is "The History of Yemen, which is called The Reflection of Concerns and Sadness in Accidents and History of Yemen." Interested in the hadith and science of the calendar and Islamic history of Yemen. He died in his hometown at the age of 82.

== Biography ==
He is Abd al-Was’i bin Yahya Hussein bin Abdullah bin Nasser bin Jaber al-Wasi al-San’ani. He was born in the city of Sana’a, the center of the Sana’a district, and the capital of the Ottoman state of Yemen, in Jumada Al-Awwal May 1878, and he was raised there. He took in jurisprudence, morphology, grammar, and hadith on its sheikhs, and they are many, including: Muhammad bin Ali Zayed, Ahmed bin Muhammad Al-Siyaghi, Abdul Razzaq bin Mohsen Al-Raqihi, Muhammad bin Muhammad Jagman, Muhammad bin Abdul Malik Al-Ansi, Ahmed bin Ali Al-Tayeb, Ahmed bin Ali Al-Sharafi, And Ismail Al-Rimi, Muhammad bin Ahmed Hamid, Muhammad bin Yahya Al-Akwa, and in the science of times Ali bin Hussein Al-Maghribi, and Al-Hussain bin Ali Al-Omari, and it was approved by them.

In 1911, he left for Mecca as a pilgrim and was taken from its scholars, including: Ahmed Khatib bin Abdul Malik Al-Shafi’i and authorized him a general permit, Muhammad bin Suleiman bin Habib Allah the Royal, Abdul Hamid bin Muhammad bin Ali Quds, and Al-Hussein bin Muhammad bin Hussein Al-Habashi Al-Alawi. In 1912, he went to the Levant and in the city of Aleppo he took it from Ahmad Al-Zarqani and in Damascus from Badr Al-Din. He has other commentaries that he mentioned with detailing his readings on them and the years of their death, "Al-Durr Al-Jami' Al-Farid."

He made tours in Islamic countries and frequently visited Egypt and the Hejaz. When he was in Damascus, the First General War broke out, and he lived there for five years. He returned to his homeland and was issued to teach at the Sana’a Mosque, and at the Scientific School or the College of Dar Al Uloom, then his guardian. He had famous speeches, and he owned a large library of manuscripts and publications that he brought with him during his travels.

Many of the people of Sana’a and Dhamar took from him, including: Al-Safi Al-Garafi, Hussein bin Yahya Al-Wase’i, his son Ahmed, Abdullah bin Ahmed Al-Wazir, Nasser bin Hussein Al-Durra, Ahmed bin Muhammad Zubara, Ahmed bin Ali Al-Kahlani, Muhammad bin Abdullah Al-Omari, and others. And it was narrated from him on the authority of a group, including: Muhammad Zahid Al-Kawthari, Ahmed bin Al-Siddiq Al-Ghamari, Ahmed Abdullah, and Abdullah bin Muhammad Ghazi Al-Makki.

In 1960, he died in Sana'a, the Mutawakkilite Kingdom of Yemen, at the age of 82.

== Interests ==
He was interested in the Islamic history of Yemen, and he investigated some religious texts, including: the collection of Imam Zaid bin Ali, and the Ali bin Musa Al-Ridha newspaper. And "Explanation of Flowers" as well as Al-Mukhtasar by Imam Al-Mahdi Ahmed bin Yahya, "Shams Al-Akhbar" in hadith, and "Kinz Al-Rashad" in asceticism.

== Personal life ==
His son is the jurist Judge Ahmed, born in 1908 and died in 1985 and is survived though his grandchildren.
