= Ahmed Baider =

Yemeni journalist

- Born: 1993 (age 32–33); Sana'a, Yemen
- Education: Sana'a University (BBA); University of Jordan
- Occupation: Journalist
- Years active: 2011–present
- Known for: Reporting on the Yemeni civil war

Ahmed Baider (born 1993) is a Yemeni journalist known for his reporting on the Yemeni civil war. Baider has collaborated with international media houses including PBS NewsHour, BBC, ITV News, Channel 4, and Sky News.

Baider has earned multiple News & Documentary Emmy Awards and nominations for the Peabody Awards and Amnesty Media Awards.

== Early life and education ==
Baider was born in 1993 and educated in Sana'a, Yemen. From an early age, he showed interest in photography and storytelling and was spurred during the 2011 Yemeni uprising.

Baider earned his bachelor's degree in Business Administration from Sana'a University. He then moved to Jordan for postgraduate studies, where he obtained a master's degree in Conflict Resolution from the University of Jordan.

== Career ==
Baider began his journalism career during the early years of the Yemeni civil conflict. As a local producer, he collaborated with numerous international news outlets to provide ground-level access and reporting from areas that were otherwise inaccessible due to the war.

Over the years, Baider worked with major global broadcasters including the BBC, ITV News, Channel 4, and Sky News.

He became known for his ability to navigate highly sensitive environments and gain access to frontlines and communities affected by famine, displacement, and violence. His work has included coverage of airstrikes, the blockade on Yemen's ports, child malnutrition, and the impact of war on civilians.

In addition to his journalism, Baider has participated in international panels discussing media access in conflict zones, press freedom in the Middle East, and the challenges of reporting in Yemen.

== Awards and nominations ==
- News & Documentary Emmy Award – Outstanding Hard News Feature Story in a Newscast (2019) coverage by PBS NewsHour of the impact of the war in Yemen on its hunger crisis.
- News & Documentary Emmy Award – Outstanding Continuing Coverage of a News Story in a News Magazine (2020) for ITV News Yemen special.
- Peabody Awards – Nominated (2021) for documentary on Yemen crisis.
- Amnesty Media Awards – Shortlisted (2020) for investigative report on humanitarian issues in Yemen.
