= Ramziya al-Iryani =

Yemeni novelist and diplomat

Ramziya Abbas Al-Eryani (رمزية عباس الإرياني) or al-Iryani (1954 – November 14, 2013) was a Yemeni novelist, writer, diplomat, and feminist. She was also the niece of the former president Abdul Rahman al-Eryani.

== Biography ==
She was born in the village of Eryan in the Ibb Governorate, went to secondary school in Taiz and then studied philosophy at Cairo University earning a bachelor's degree in 1977. She also had a master's degree in Arabic literature. In 1980 she became the first female diplomat to join the Yemeni diplomatic corps. She was head of the Yemeni Women's Union (YWU) and was a board member of the Arab Family Organization. In her political work, she was a tireless supporter of feminism in Yemen and encouraged women to run for political office. In 2012, at the International Women's Day celebration, she gave a keynote speech as the director of YWU. Al-Eryani died in 2013 in Berlin during surgery; her body was returned to Sana'a and interred in al-Rahma cemetery. Al-Eryani was married to Ambassador Abdulmalik Al-Eryani and had four children, Al Azd, Mai, Maisoon, and Aiman.

== Writing ==
Al-Eryani started publishing when still in her teens. Her novel Ḍaḥīyat al-Jashaʿ (The Victim of Greed), published in 1970, is considered to be the first novel by a Yemeni woman. Her first book of short stories La'allahu ya'ud (Maybe He'll Return) was published from Damascus in 1981. Since then, she wrote several more volumes of fiction as well as several children's books. She had also written a book on Yemeni women pioneers called Raidat Yemeniyat (1990). Al-Eryani's short stories have appeared in English translation in an anthology of Arab women writers.

Al-Eryani's writing addresses gender issues in a predominantly patriarchal, Islamic society. She also writes about the importance of education for women in an Arab society. Other themes in her work include Yemeni political struggles of the day.
