= Amat Al Alim Alsoswa =

Yemeni politician

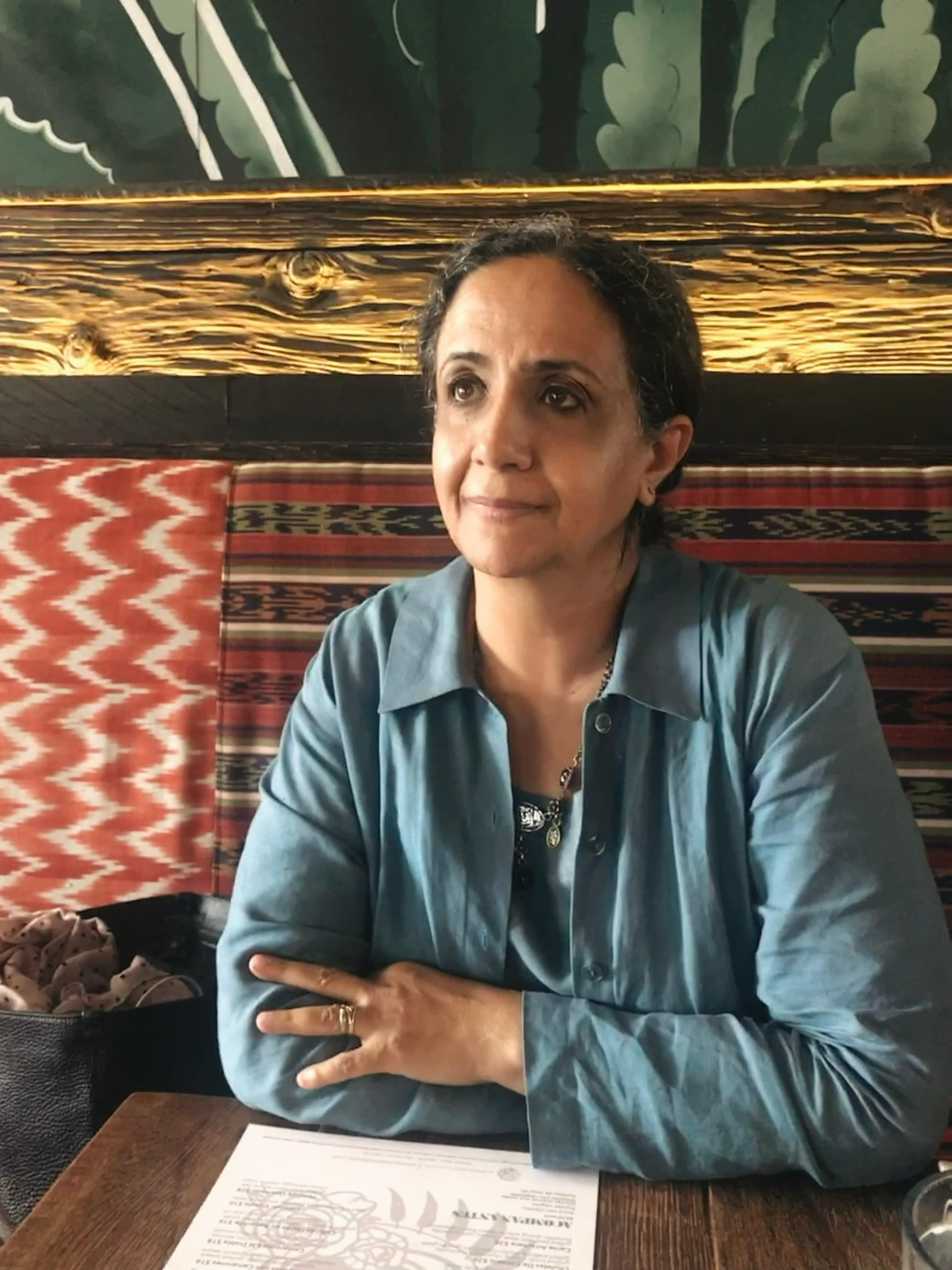
Ambassador & Minister Amatalalim Alsoswa

Amat Al Alim Alsoswa (Arabic: امة العليم السوسوه; born 27 August 1958) is a Yemeni journalist, and Yemen's first female ambassador and minister.

She served as the Assistant Secretary-General, then Assistant Administrator and Director of UNDP's Regional Bureau for Arab States.

== Biography ==
Alsoswa was born on 27 August 1958 in Taiz. began her career as a journalist at a very young age: she began broadcasting at the age of 10 as part of a local radio program in Taiz Governorate. Later on, she became a news anchor on Yemeni television, also serving as a political commentator. Alsoswa holds a B.A. in Mass Communications from Cairo University (1980) and an M.A. in International Communications from the American University in Washington, D.C. (1984). She speaks Arabic and English fluently and also speaks French and Russian.

Between 1984 and 1986, she worked as Deputy TV Programs Director at Sanaa TV, where she held the most senior position as a woman in Yemeni television. Later, she became the Chief Editor of Mutaba'at I'elamiah Journal. From 1989 to 1991, Alsoswa led the Yemeni Women's Union before Yemeni unification.

From 1997 to 1999, she was Undersecretary at Yemen's Ministry of Information and Chairperson of the National Women's Committee, the first woman Undersecretary in the Ministry of Information. Between 2000 and 2003, she served as Yemen's ambassador to Sweden, Denmark and the Netherlands. In the Netherlands, she was Yemen's Permanent Representative to the Organisation for the Prohibition of Chemical Weapons. She was also the first woman Ambassador to the Netherlands, residing in The Hague, and a non-resident Ambassador to both Sweden and Denmark.

In May 2003, Alsoswa was appointed the Minister of Human rights in Yemen, the second female Minister of Human Rights in Yemen's history after Waheeba Ghalib Faree al-Fakih. During her tenure, she established and oversaw Yemen's Human Rights Ministry, initiated the country's second national human rights report, and established a public human rights resource center. In 2006, she became the Assistant Secretary-General, Assistant Administrator for the Regional Bureau for Arab States of the United Nations Development Programme (UNDP).

On 22 March 2014, Alsoswa was appointed Executive Director of the Executive Bureau for the Acceleration of Aid Absorption and Implementation of the Mutual Accountability Framework.

Alsoswa has published and lectured extensively and has received numerous awards. She was made an Officier of the Légion d'Honneur (France) and received the Medal of the Egyptian Committee for Afro-Asian Solidarity (Egypt). Alsoswa is also a Trustee of the Arab Democracy Foundation.

Alsoswa has written and spoken on women's rights and democracy. She has been an activist for human rights in general and freedom of expression in particular. Alsoswa asserts that in order for women to fight against discrimination in Arab countries, older traditions of interpretations of Islamic texts which were once more favorable to women must be revived, girls need equal access to education and recognise women's contributions to the family and society as important and valuable are necessary for change. She also stresses that "even against immense odds, women remain catalysts for reform in Arab countries."
