= Amal Basha =

Yemeni activist

Amal Basha (Arabic: أمل الباشا, born November 19, 1962) is a Yemeni women's rights activist, chair of the Sisters' Arab Forum for Human Rights (SAF). As the chair of SAF, she "defends the rights of women, prisoners and refugees, and fights for more political freedoms."

Basha studied political science, economics and mass communication at the American University in Cairo. She holds an M.A. degree in public administration, from the National Institute of Administrative Sciences (NIAS), and women's studies from Sana'a University and in international development and gender studies from the University of Sussex, UK. She also has a license to practice law in her country. At an early stage in her career, Basha served in various economic positions in the Yemeni government, and was considered a leading personality in the field of recruiting human resources for organizations from the third sector in Yemen.

In April 2013 she publicly confronted Sheikh Sadiq al-Ahmar in the conference hall of Yemen's National Dialogue Conference: Ahmar seemed to be backing away from appointing feminist Nabila al-Zubair as chair of the body deciding the future of the disputed city of Sa'dah until Basha gave him this "public flaying".

She won the Takreem Arab Woman of the Year Award in 2014. In the same year (2014), the Danish Institute for Human Rights published its essay "The Discourse of Gender Equality in the Constitution of Yemen". In 2015 she spoke at the "Women's Power to Stop the War" conference (in Yemen).

In 2017, she received an honorary doctorate from the University of Toronto.

As an 8 years old child she was married off and later managed to obtain a divorce.

Her son is Luai Ahmed, a Swedish journalist and columnist, who at the age of 21 managed to reach Sweden and received political asylum there, and later also Swedish citizenship.

== See also ==
- Luai Ahmed
