= Al-Ayyam (Yemen) =

Yemeni daily newspaper

- Type: Daily newspaper
- Format: Berliner (Midi)
- Owner: Bashraheel Family
- Founder: Mohammad Ali Bashraheel
- Publisher: Al-Ayyam Foundation for Printing, Press, Publishing & Distribution
- Editor-in-chief: Tamam Bashraheel
- Deputy editor: Bashraheel Hisham Bashraheel
- Founded: August 7, 1958; 68 years ago
- Language: Arabic
- Headquarters: Al-Ayyam Building, Front Bay, Crater, Aden
- Country: Yemen
- Circulation: 70,000
- Website: alayyam.info

Al Ayyam (Arabic: الأيام) is an independent Yemeni daily newspaper published in Aden, Yemen. The paper is issued by Dar Al-Ayyam, formally known as the Al-Ayyam Foundation for Printing, Press, Publishing and Distribution (Arabic: مؤسسة الأيام للطباعة والصحافة والنشر والتوزيع) and owned by the Bashraheel family. Al-Ayyam covers domestic news of Aden and other southern governorates as well as Yemen national, and international news, and publishes opinion pieces and reviews. Al-Ayyam is one of the oldest and most influential newspapers in the country founded by Mohammad Ali Bashraheel in 1958 during the British colonial period in Aden.

== History and profile ==
Al Ayyam was founded in 1958. The founder was Mohammad Bashraheel. The paper was shut down after South Yemen became independent under a Marxist regime in 1967. Bashraheel's son Hisham resumed publication in 1990 after the unification of North and South Yemen.

The paper's compound in Sanaa had been the subject of an attack by a dozen gunmen in February 2008. Based in Aden, it was the most widely read newspaper in southern Yemen, when it was one of seven newspapers closed in May 2009, with the government accusing the paper of supporting separatism. It reappeared in May 2014 after a five-year halt.

== See also ==
- Yemeni unification
