= Luai Ahmed =

Swedish journalist (born 1993)

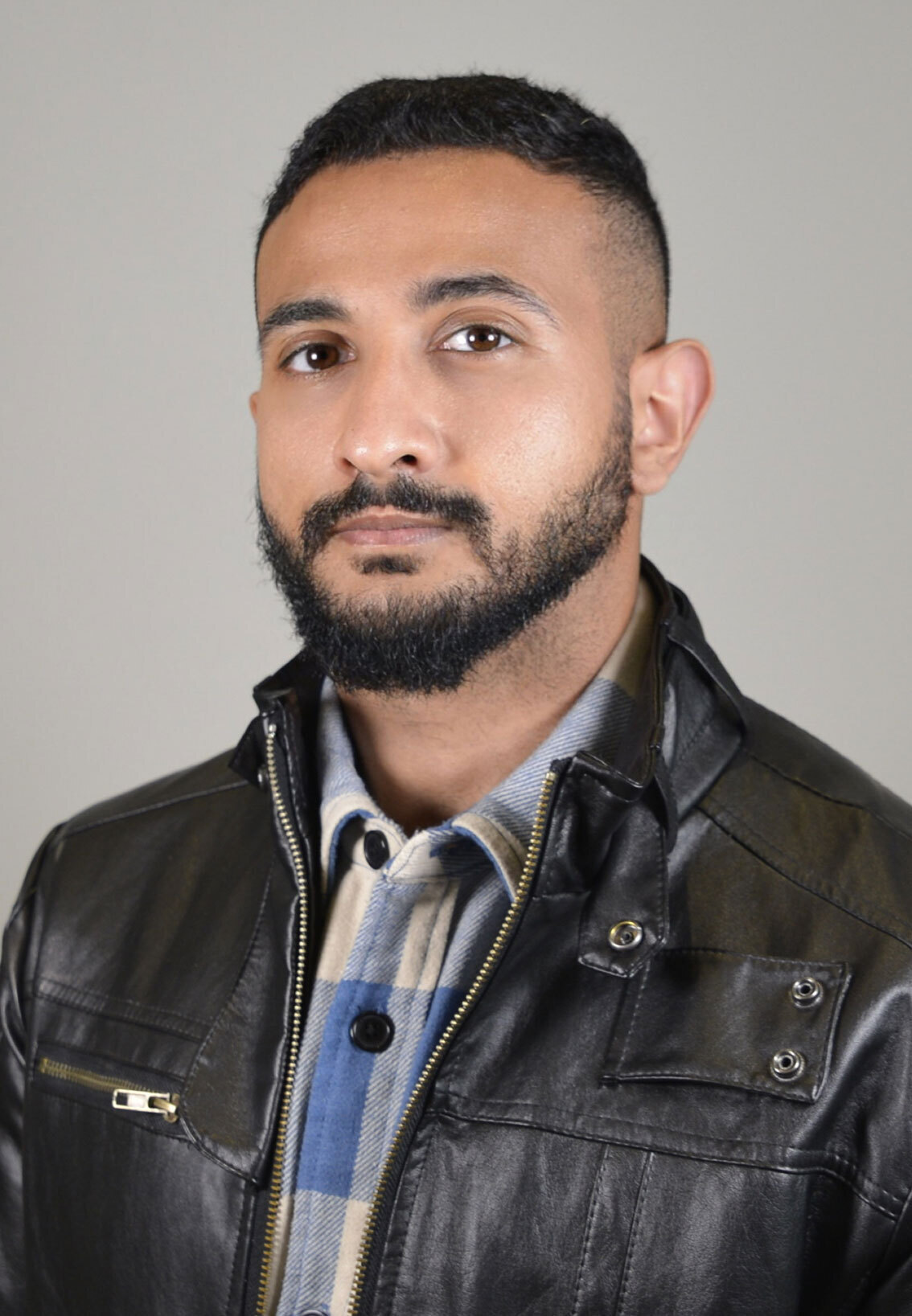
- Luai Ahmed
- Born: September 5, 1993 (age 33); Sanaa, Yemen
- Occupations: Journalist, columnist and influencer

Luai Ahmed (Arabic: لؤي أحمد; born September 5, 1993) is a Yemeni and Swedish journalist, columnist, and influencer. Ahmed is active on social media and is a critic of radical Islam, Islamic dictstorships, and antisemitism in Islam. Ahmed is openly gay.

== Family life ==
Ahmed was raised in the capital of Yemen, Sana'a. He grew up in his home with the values instilled in him by his mother, Amal Basha, a peace and women's rights activist and winner of several honors, including an honorary doctorate from the University of Toronto.

Following his mother's feminist activism, the Al-Qaeda organization threatened his family in 2013 in an open letter to the population in Yemen to receive his family's address.

== Career ==
In 2014 Luai Ahmed got an opportunity to hold a lecture at the invitation of the "Olof Palme Foundation" in Sweden. His family members urged him to seek asylum there. He came to Halmstad and since then and for the next four years, he lived there. He asked for and received political asylum, and later also Swedish citizenship. After that he lived in Malmö and in Stockholm. He sympathized with the anti-immigration political party Sweden Democrats, and wrote against the Swedish society’s contempt towards the party’s policies.

Ahmed is active on social networks with accumulatively more than 600k followers, on X with 200,000 followers, 300,000 on Instagram, 75,000 on TikTok, and 11,000 on Facebook. His videos get millions of views on average. During October 2023, his videos went viral on the network, and in the months since October and November 2023, he added about 100,000 followers. He condemns what he says is the hypocrisy of the Middle East, the hatred of Jews that is instilled from a young age, the servitude to religion and the Muslim world's delay in social and technological progress.

In addition, he was a columnist for the conservative Swedish newspaper Bulletin, where he writes articles against antisemitism and hatred of Jews as well as articles in which Islam, integration and immigration policy are recurring topics. In Yemen he wrote for the newspapers Yemen Today, the Yemen Times and the youth magazine YoO. According to him, he does not agree with the concept of Islamophobia, because phobia (according to him) implies an extremely irrational and exaggerated fear. The fear of liberals, and especially free women in Islamic societies, of prison or the death penalty, is a rational and legitimate fear – so Ahmed said in an interview with the satirical magazine Charlie Hebdo.

In 2021, he published his book "A Paradoxical Journey of a Refugee from the Sharia of Yemen to the Rainbow in Sweden", which tells about his first five years in Sweden, with a humorous critique of extreme Islam, but also of Sweden, where he currently lives.

== Work and Advocacy ==
Ahmed visited Israel in November 2023 during the war with Hamas. After his visit to Al-Aqsa Mosque, he described the fact that non-Muslims are not allowed to enter apartheid.

On February 27, 2025, Ahmed delivered a speech at the UN Human Rights Watch, where he accused the organization of silence on the ongoing crises in Yemen, Syria, and Sudan, and claimed that they are consistently overshadowed by the UN’s primary focus on Israel.

Ahmed has made media appearances such as Piers Morgan, Sky News, as well as Swedish national television SVT, and Israeli television channels.

His story has been profiled in a variety of international publications, such as Charlie Hebdo, The Jerusalem Post, and The Times of Israel. He has also been featured in Germany’s Die Welt, Sweden’s Hallandsposten, and Israel Hayom.

== Education ==
Ahmed studied international business at the Lebanese International University in Yemen. He also studied International Migration and Ethnic Relations at Malmö University.

== See also ==
- Amal Basha
