= Education in Yemen =

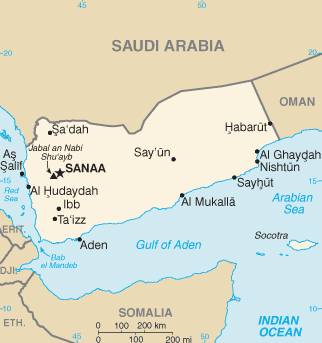
Map of Yemen

Yemen ranked 150 out of 177 in the 2006 Human Development Index and 121 out of 140 countries in the Gender Development Index (2006). In 2005, 81 percent of Yemen's school-age population was enrolled in primary school; enrollment of the female population was 74 percent. Then in 2005, about 46 percent of the school-age population was enrolled in secondary school, including only 30 percent of eligible females. The country is still struggling to provide the requisite infrastructure. School facilities and educational materials are of poor quality, classrooms are too few in number, and the teaching faculty is inadequate.

The Government has made the development of education system its top priority. The share of the budget dedicated to education has remained high during the past decade, averaging between 14 and 20% of the total government expenditure and as of 2000 it is 32.8 percent. The education expenditure is 9.6 percent of GDP for the year 2001 as seen in the chart below. In the strategic vision for the next 25 years since 2000, the government has committed to bring significant changes in the education system, thereby reducing illiteracy to less than 10% by 2025. Although Yemen's government provides for universal, compulsory, free education for children ages six through 15, the more U.S. Department of State reports that compulsory attendance is not enforced.

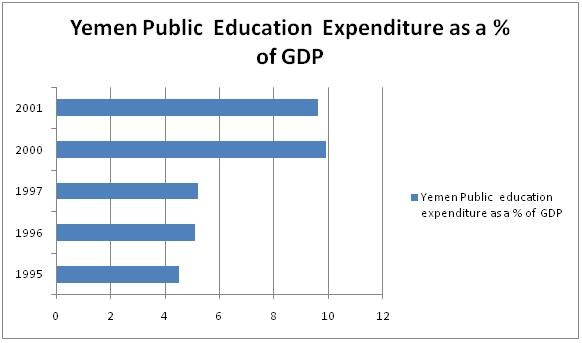

== History ==
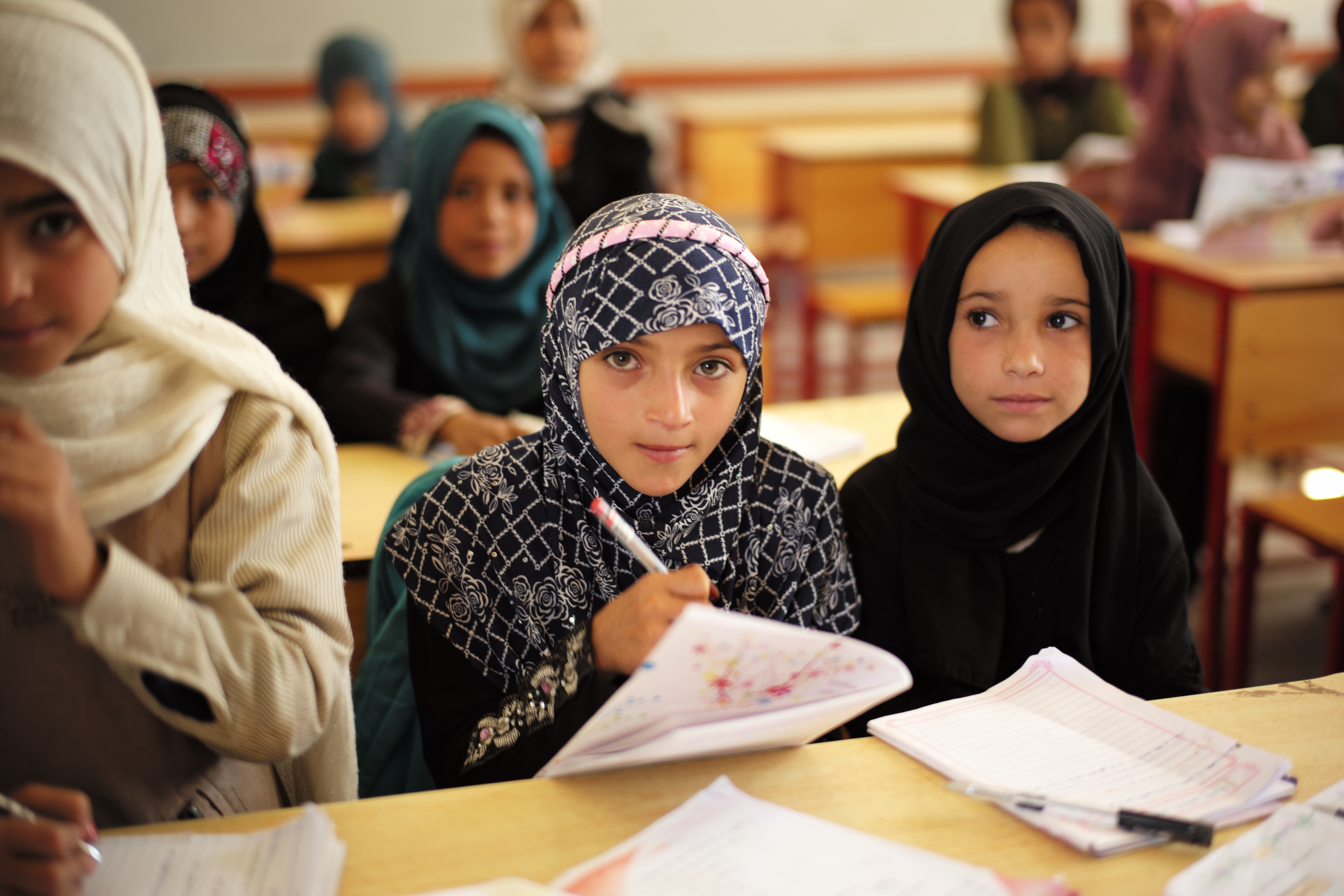
Girls in school, Sanaa, 2013

According to Yemen's Poverty Reduction Strategy Paper 2002, basic education is still unable to provide for all children of schooling age (6–14). Yemen's primary school enrollment rates have increased from 73% to 87% for males and from 28% to 63% for females between 1991 and 2004. The main educational problems in Yemen are a weak education system, population dispersion, insufficient public funding, lack of the institutional capacity necessary to efficiently deliver basic education services, and the need of children to work to support their families are the main factors that deter children from attending schools. There are also social factors contributing to deterring children, and girls in particular from attending school, such as long distance from the school, lack of transportation, and single-sex schools in rural areas, low levels of teacher training and qualification, gaps in enrollment between boys and girls, weak institutional capacity from the Ministry to school levels, and low community participation

The government's effort for education started in 1962 when the Yemen Arab Republic was established. During the 1970s, Yemen saw an expansion of basic education; however, there was a certain disparity between North and South, and they adapted very different education policies until its unification in 1990. Traditionally, North Yemen has been a much closed society and education was limited only to religious schools where children memorized the Koran, or to schools run by local initiatives. However, not all children could have access to these schools, and the majority of the students were boys, while few girls attended.

The development of education in South Yemen began in 1967 after British withdrawal. During the British occupation of South, education was available only in Aden. Primary and intermediate schools existed in each small township of Steamer Point, Crater, Shaikh Othman, etc. There was only one girls' secondary school in Khormaksar and two private schools were in Crater and Steamer Point.

During the 1970s, several education plans were made for the new republic and the educational situation of the South had really taken off that of the North. The education system in the north adapted 6-3-3 (6 years of primary school, 3 years of preparatory, 3 years of secondary). The south also adapted the same education system; however, it changed to 8-4 (8 years integrated school, 4 years of secondary school). Secondary education had a choice of academic, vocational, technical or teacher training education.

After the unification of North and South Yemen in 1990, these two education systems were merged into a single system, and 9-3 (9 years of basic education, 3 years of secondary education) was adapted. Along with that, enrollment was diversified into the science and literary tracks in grades 11 and 12. The unified Yemen was facing several educational problems such as lack of a budget for education, lack of government leadership, lack of Yemeni teachers, overcrowding and inefficiency in management. In the same year as its unification, the World Conference on Education for All was held in Jomtien, Thailand. In response to this conference, Yemen's Ministry of Education had developed several national education strategies with the cooperation of the World Bank and donor countries.

== Education management system ==
There are several ministries that manage the education system at different levels. General education is under the purview of Ministry of Education). Vocational schools and community colleges are managed by the Ministry of Technical Education and Vocational Training. The tertiary education is regulated by the Ministry of Higher Education and Scientific Research. There is also a small private sector that accounts for 2% of basic and secondary each and 15% of university enrollments for the year 2005.

The Government of Yemen has subsidized public schooling at all levels. Most of the expenditure increase in the education sector is allotted for post secondary education. This expenditure increase led to greater expansion of education services. From 250,000 students in the 1970, there are now about 4.3 million students in basic education. In addition, between 1996 and 2004, enrollment increased at secondary level from 324,000 to 595,000 students and at the university level from 104,000 to 201,000 students.

Recently, Government of Yemen launched an exercise to improve communication and coordinate policies among the three ministries so as to have a more integrated vision for education. The government has also worked in collaboration with the Governments of Netherlands, Germany and the UK, and also with multi-donor organizations, such as the World Bank, DFID and Canadian International Development Agency to make substantial improvements in the education system at all levels.

== Basic education ==
In Yemen the basic education comprises nine years of basic compulsory education for children of ages between 6–14 years old. The government has developed the National Basic Education Development Strategy in 2003 that aimed at providing education to 95% of Yemeni children between the ages of 6–14 years and also to decrease the gap between males and females in urban and rural areas.

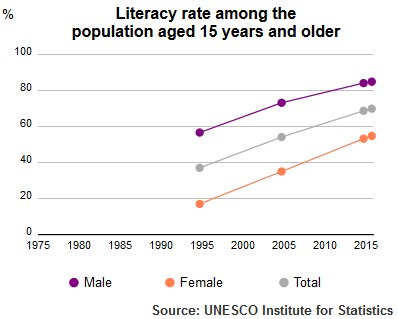
Literacy Rate of Yemen population plus15 1995–2015 by UNESCO Institute of Statistics

=== Basic Education Programs ===
==== Basic Education Expansion Program (BEEP) ====
Since 1997, the World Bank and Ministry of Education started studying the current educational situation in Yemen and set strategies to achieve expansion of basic education. After a long discussion, it was admitted as Basic Education Expansion Program (BEEP) by the World Bank and implemented with about 60 million US dollars.

This program specifically aimed at increasing rural girls' enrollment in the first six years of basic education by improving of access, quality, and capacity building. BEEP was successful and the pilot project expanded to all 20 governorates.

==== Basic Education Development Project (BEDP) ====
In August 2000, the Basic Education Development Program (BEDP) which was a follow-up and expansion of the Basic Education Expansion Program (BEEP) was approved by the World Bank. It has been implemented with the cooperation of DFID and the Netherlands since June 2004.

BEDP involves the construction and rehabilitation of schools (grades 1–9), including latrines, hygienic hand washing and drinking water facilities, boundary walls and laboratories, and the procurement of laboratory equipment (including chemical materials) for grades 1–9.

BEDP aims at implementing the plans in all governorates while the operation of BEDS (Basic Education Development Strategy) has been concentrated in four particular governorates. The size of this joint project (BEDP) is US$120 million and core of the BEDS.

In November 2006, EKN and DFID signed a Technical Assistance Trust Fund. This Fund has been disbursed to support BEDP operations such as preparation projects for girls' secondary education and the preparation of vocational training project II initiated by the World Bank.

==== Basic Education Development Strategy (BEDS) ====
In 2002, the government developed a national Basic Education Development Strategy (BEDS) with the support of various development partners and stakeholders.[13] This project implemented in four districts of the governorate of Sanaa at first, and expanded to cover 50% of the districts of the governorates of Sanaa, Amran, Mahwet and Al-Dhalea in 2002. Later, it was expanded to all 61 districts of the four governorates.[14]

BEDS had following objectives; raising the enrollment rates to 95% by 2015, improving the quality of teaching, upgrading curriculum, school administration reform, improving fund management, decentralizing management of educational services, expanding the availability of school space for girls, using underutilized classroom space, instituting double-shifts, constructing new schools based on school mapping, enhancing community participation. [15] The government held a series of consultative meetings and workshops with civil stakeholders to build ownership among citizens. Over 400 male and female citizens who were representative of the Women's Committee, Teachers, Union, and Parents' and Students' Councils from both the central and local levels participated in the meetings.[13]

The monitoring of implementation of the BEDS was operated by an Inter-ministerial Steering Committee (ISC) and guided by a Technical Team (TT). Technical Team also had responsibility for regular co-ordination with donor community. The responsibility for the actual activities and implementation of the BEDS were carried by Ministry of Education where accounts for authorities and organization at decentralized level.[16]

The implementation of the BEDS was greatly influenced by economic situations such as a decline in oil prices, damage to agriculture due to drought, and a decline in external support. When these main resources of national economy were harmed, Yemen's economy did not possess the ability to continue implementation of the plan.[17]

In 2004, a Partnership Declaration for Implementation of the BEDS was signed between the Government of Yemen and the World Bank, UNICEF, WFP, ILO, UNESCO, the Governments of Germany, United Kingdom, The Netherlands, France, EU. [18]

The objective of this Declaration is to harmonize strategies and effectively allocate all government and donor resources for basic education. Through this partnership, the implementation of the BEDS gained strong sponsors and has shown remarkable progress.[16]

=== EFA-Fast Track Initiative (FTI) ===
After the G8 Summit in June 2002, Yemen was invited to participate in the Education For All: Fast Track Initiative (EFA: FTI). The FTI was launched in April 2002 as a global partnership between donor and developing countries to accelerate the Millennium Development Goals for education in 2015. Yemen faces rapid increase of population and needed additional funds to expand their educational strategy.

The government drafted FTI proposal based on the Basic Education Development Strategy (BEDS) and Poverty Reduction Strategy Proposal with the cooperation of the World Bank. This proposal was reviewed in October 2002 in Brussels, and approved in donor meeting held in Paris in 2003. One year later, ten million US dollars were given to the Government as a Catalytic fund.

FTI supported basic education mainly in the governorates of Al-Baidha, Dhamar, Hodeidah and Hajjah and part of this grant was allocated to the governorates of Al-Jouf, Shabowah and Lahej.The task forces were established to strength and facilitate the implementation between the government and donors.

The Ministry of Education has promoted reform policies by following the FTI framework, and has been careful for monitoring the quality and efficiency of service delivery. The Ministry of Education also engaged in the administrative reform, and reinforced relations with the local government. Senior technical officials of the Ministry of Education and the local government's officials held several workshops about the allocation of FTI fund. A deputy ministers' committee has been established in the central ministry and local education department for building a capacity in the area of educational administration and for policy making among the administrative staff. The involvement of the local government's officials contributed to reflect their voices in making policy and brought them a serious incentive for the implementation of the plan.

=== Enrollment ===
The government increased public expenditure for basic education and allocated a share of 17.2% of the public expenditures in 2003, and 16.97% in 2004 which are about 4.5% of the GDP.

Basic education schools increased from around 9930 schools in 2000 to 10293 schools in 2002 and 10684 in 2004. The number of classrooms also showed an increase from 97,462 classrooms in 2003 to 98329 in 2004. In particular, more than two thirds of the number of schools and classrooms including private schools were built in rural areas. The increase of gross enrollment rate is contributed to special consideration such as exemption of school fee or school feeding programs for the children from poor families. These programs supported 106,169 girls in 1272 schools. In 2004, a dry meals service was operated and 248,244 girls in the basic education level were included in this service.

These projects contributed to improve enrolment rate in the basic education level (6–14 years) up to 72% for boys and 42% for girls in 1999[21]. In 2004, the enrollment rate increased to 87% for boys and 63% for girls. In Yemen, only about one-third (36%) of 10- to 14-year-old working children attend school, compared to 58% of non-working children. This is even lower for girls. Girls' retention at the basic education level is a major problem; out of every 100 girls who join basic education in Grade 1, only 25% will complete Grade 9, thereby limiting the intake at secondary level.

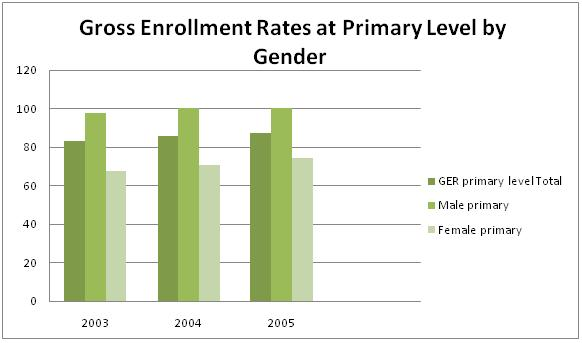

== Secondary education ==
After the nine years of primary education, students receive Intermediate School Certificate and attend secondary school for three years. In addition to normal secondary schools in which to prepare for university, technical secondary schools, vocational training centers, a veterinary training school, a Health Manpower Training Institute, and several agricultural secondary schools are available. There are also Islamic schools, and private schools. In normal secondary schools, students take a common curriculum during their first year, after that, students are given choice either the scientific or literary track. At the end of third year, students take examinations, and an 'Al Thanawiya' (General Secondary Education Certificate) is given to students who pass the examination. In the school year 1999–2000 was 439,129 boys and 324,493 girls' enrolled in secondary education.

The secondary school system is still in need of proper management. Only 21% of the schools have more than 180 students (13% of rural and 47% of urban schools), which is the minimum number of students required to have a viable secondary school offering the two mandatory academic tracks. Also only 27% of the schools offered two parallel streams in grades 11 and 12. The provision of education by private sector is also not a viable option due to excessive regulatory barriers that limit private financing. Then the deployment of teachers is also inefficient. There are some schools with excess of some teachers of particular subjects, while there may be shortage of teachers of the same subjects in other schools. The education system also lacks formal professional teaching development program. In addition, the various ministries have no coordination in terms of teachers' development. Each year about 15,000 students with teaching degrees graduate from universities. Out of those 6000–7000 teachers are hired mostly in basic education.

The gross enrollment rate for secondary education in Yemen is 45.6 percent in 2005.The regional average of Middle East and North African countries is 73.4 percent. Girls fare worse than boys particularly in rural areas. In 2006, the secondary school net attendance ratio NAR was 60.4% for male 55.7% for female, with a 17 percentage point difference between the urban and rural NARs for males and 25.9 percentage point difference for females. In July 2007 the Cabinet approved a National General Secondary Education Strategy that aimed to provide high quality secondary education for transition to tertiary education and the labor market in an equitable and cost effective manner. This strategy will work towards reducing both gender and geographic inequity in the attainment of secondary education.

== University education ==
University education is of 4 years except for Engineering and Medicine, which require 5 to 6 years respectively. There are seven public universities in Sanaa, Aden, Hodeida, Taiz, Ibb, Dhamar, and Hadramaut (Mukallah) and five private universities and religious universities. Also, there are two community colleges in Sanaa and Aden. The enrollment in public universities is about 174,000 in 2005/06 and about 12,000 are enrolled in private universities (2005/06).

Thanawiya examinations' results are very important for getting into university and the required score varies depending on each faculty. The percentage who pursues university education is less than 10 percent.

In 2001, the Ministry of Higher Education and Scientific Research was established to meet the demand for social development. Every year, about 300–400 students who seek high quality of education go abroad for education. US, U.K. and other European countries and India are popular countries for higher education. The National Strategy of Higher Education in 2006 also aims to provide multiple paths in the field of education.

The higher education in Yemen still has a long way to go, despite high investment in this level the staff-student ratios are not favorable, equipment and learning resources are very poor; high absenteeism among professors; no systematic process to review and update the curricula; shortage of laboratories and computers for engineering students. Also there is a need of a decentralized system for the utilization of funds.

== Yemeni universities ==
- Sanaa University
- University of Aden
- Hadhramout University
- Taiz University
- Thamar University
- Hodeidah University
- Ibb University
- University of Science and Technology (Yemen)
- Al-Ahgaff University
- Iman University
- Queen Arwa University
- Yemen University
- Lebanese International University (Yemen)

== Technical Education and Vocational Training (TEVT) ==
There are courses provided for the TEVT at the post basic and post-secondary levels. The government is making efforts to expand TEVT at various levels; nonetheless it is still relatively small, accounting for only one in 200 students at all levels and one in eight tertiary level graduates. Also less than one percent of the TEVT students are women. The private sector is also very small and limited to offering certain types of training and skill development programs. The TEVT system is also rigid, as most of the post secondary TEVT students are not offered any courses even in community colleges or universities. Then the only higher education option available to these TEVT graduates is to continue with up to three years of post-secondary education.

There is a need to expand a number of employment opportunities in the country with increased public, private collaboration. In addition, the TEVT should be provided based on the current demand of the labor market rather than being more supply-driven. The new ministry is trying to improve its management system to be more effective through the National Vocational and Technical Education Strategy.

== Rising unemployment ==
Unemployment is a major problem that needs to be dealt with as the population grows and education system struggles to keep up with the new demands in the labor market. In 1999 the youth unemployment stood at 18.7, and as elsewhere in the Middle East and North Africa the unemployment in women with higher education was also very high. It was estimated, due to lack of labor force survey since 1999, the number of unemployed people could rise to a million in 2006 that is about 16.5% of labor force.

Lack of skills of the labor force is also one of the main problems cited in Doing Business 2009, for private companies to set up businesses in Yemen.

== Girls' education ==
The girls' enrollment rate of Yemen is the lowest in Middle Eastern countries, and there is huge disparity between boys and girls, and between urban and rural areas. The low girls' participation in education is attributed to several socio-cultural factors. The tradition of early marriage in rural areas hinders girls' schooling and leads to high drop out rates. The chastity of girls has great importance in rural areas; therefore parents are unwilling to send girls to mixed gender schools. Also, negative social attitudes towards girls' education, and a lack of female teachers contribute to low female enrollment

The limited number of schools, employment opportunities, overcrowding and a low quality of education discourages families from sending their girls to school. In addition, male teachers' conservative attitudes towards girls, the distance from schools in rural areas, a lack of books and teaching materials and parents' financial constraints limit girls' opportunities for education.

== Literacy ==
According to the United Nations, the adult literacy rate for Yemen in 2007 is 40.5 percent for females and 77 percent for males. The overall literacy rate for the population of ages 15 and older was 49 percent. There has been improvement in literacy rate from 37.1 percent in 1994 to 58.9 percent in 2007. By comparison, low-income countries on average have an adult literacy rate of approximately 60 percent.

== See also ==
- List of universities in Yemen
- Mobile schools in Yemen
- Education in the Middle East and North Africa
- History of Yemen
