= Muhammad Sa'id al-Qaddal =

Sudanese historian

- Born: 1935; Sinkat, Sudan
- Died: 6 January 2008 (aged 72–73); Khartoum, Sudan
- Occupations: Academic, professor, and historian
- Years active: 1966–2004
- Movement: Secularism
- Spouse: Fatima Baaboud

Muhammad Said al-Qaddal (Arabic: محمد سعيد القدال) was a Sudanese intellectual and historian whose research and views are distinguished for their depth and clarity, particularly the ones regarding the history of certain Sudanese religious communities and ideological parties, as well as his research on the field of educational curriculum.

== Life ==
Muhammad Said al-Qaddal was born in 1935 in Sinkat, eastern Sudan, where he was taught the Quran. His father, Sheikh al-Qaddal, was seconded to work in Hadhramaut, Yemen, therefore, al-Qaddal and his family moved there, and it is where he studied middle school.

== Education ==
al-Qaddal studied at:

- Khartoum State primary schools.
- Faculty of Arts, University of Khartoum, 1958.
- Master's degree at University of California.
- Ph.D. in Modern History of Sudan from University of Khartoum.

== Career ==
- History Assistant Inspector, Ministry of Education: 1966–1969
- Head of the Department of History, Higher Teachers' Institute: 1970–1972
- Lecturer: Department of History, University of Khartoum: 1982–1986
- Associate Lecturer, University of Khartoum: 1987–1992
- Associate Lecturer, University of Aden: 1993–2000
- Associate Lecturer, University of Khartoum: 2000–2003
- Professor, University of Khartoum: 2004

== Research papers ==
- World Conference on History of Mahdist War, University of Khartoum: 1981
- Postgraduate Studies of Arab Universities, University of Khartoum: 1982
- Hundred Years after the Berlin Conference 1884, Makerere University, Uganda: 1984
- Rewriting Arab History, Union of Arab Historians, Baghdad: 1984
- Social-Change in Africa, Harare, Zimbabwe: 1986
- Society of the Revival of Islamic Heritage, University of Aden: 1992
- Egyptian-Sudanese Relations, Cairo: 1997
- Western-Arab Relations, Philadelphia University, Jordan: 2003
- Development of Faculty of Arts’ Curriculum, Hodeidah University, Yemen: 2004
- The Hadhrami Migration to Southeast Asia, Kuala Lumpur: 2005

== Works ==
- Education during the National Democratic Revolution Phase: 1970
- The Mahdist State and Abyssinia (original: al-Mahdiyah wa-al-Habashah): 1973
- Sudanese Communist Party and the 1969 Sudanese coup d'état: 1985
- Imam al-Mahdi: A Painting of a Sudanese Rebel (original: al-Imam al-Mahdi: Lawha li-tha`ir sudani): 1986
- The Economic Policy of the Mahdist State: 1987
- Islam and Politics in Sudan (original: Al-Islam wa-al-siyasiyyah fi al-Sudan) (book): 1992
- Belonging and Alienation: Studies in the History of Sudan: 1992
- History of Modern Sudan (original: Ta'rikh al-Sudan al-hadith): 1993
- Sheikh al-Qaddal Pasha: A Sudanese Teacher in Hadhramaut (original: Al-Shaykh al-Qaddal Basha): 1997
- Sultan Ali Bin Salah al-Qu'aiti: Half a Century of Political Struggle in Hadhramaut: 1998
- Cooper: Memoirs of a Political Detainee in Sudan Prisons: 1997
- Milestones in the History of the Sudanese Communist Party: 1999
- Guide to the Modern History of Europe: From the Renaissance Period to World War II: 2000
- Guide to Writing University Research: 2000
- Sheikh Mustafa al-Amin: A Journey of a Lifetime from Abyssinia to Hamburg: 2003

== Death ==
On January 6, 2008, at the age of 73, al-Qaddal died following a health emergency in Khartoum, Sudan, and was buried there.
