= National Institute of Administrative Sciences =

- المعهد الوطني للعلوم الإدارية
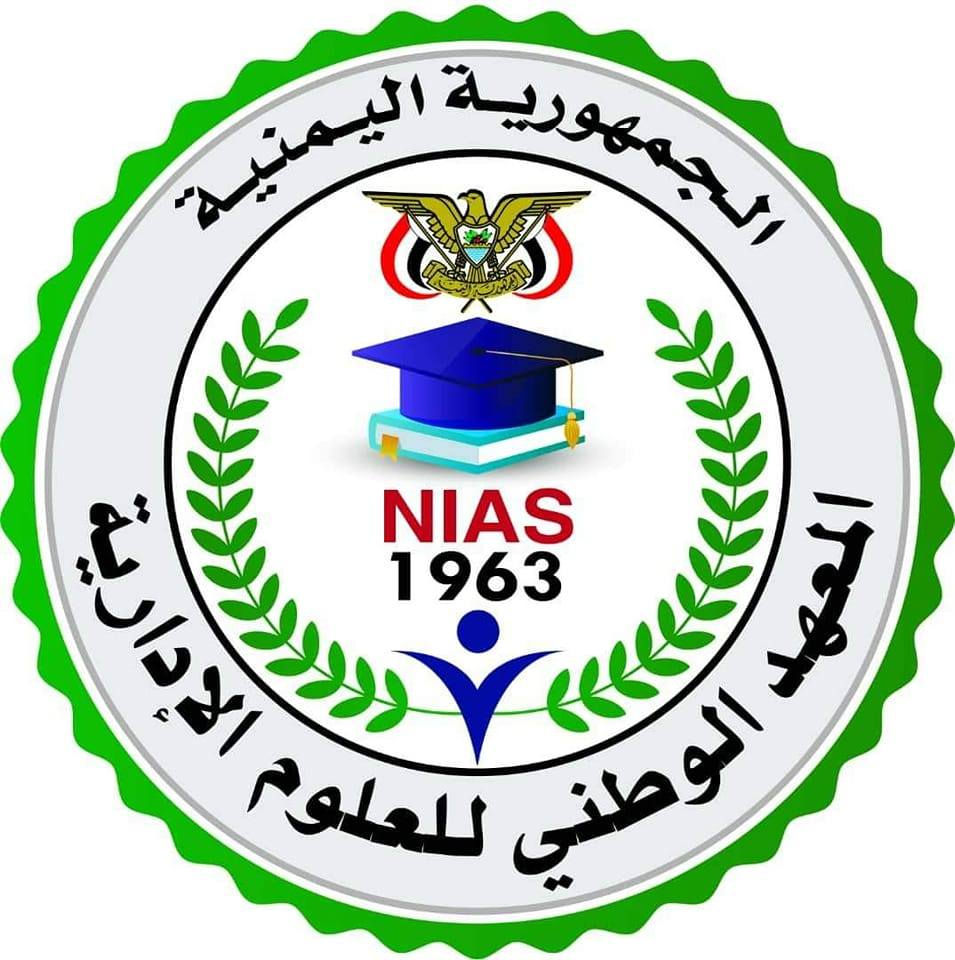
- Type: Public academic institution
- Established: 1963
- President: Dr. Mohammed Deifallah Al-Qatabri
- Faculty: 187
- Students: 4,900
- Location: Sanaa, Yemen
- Website: nias-ye.academy

The National Institute of Administrative Sciences (المعهد الوطني للعلوم الإدارية) ; NIAS is a leading Yemeni governmental academic institution in the field of administrative training and human resources development. Headquartered in the Yemeni capital, Sanaa, it is considered a "national house of expertise" according to the law of its establishment. It is dedicated to qualifying senior administrative leaders in the state, providing consultations, and conducting scientific research in the fields of public administration and development.

== History ==
The National Institute of Administrative Sciences was established in 1963, making it one of the pioneering Arab training institutes in public administration sciences, research, and developmental consulting. Its establishment coincided with the early beginnings of building the modern administrative apparatus of the Yemen Arab Republic (North Yemen) following the 26 September Revolution in 1962.

Over the past decades, the institute has qualified and trained human resources to work in various state agencies, public, and private sectors. It has also contributed to drafting administrative policies, developing services, and simplifying government procedures.

== Vision and objectives ==
The institute aims to achieve comprehensive administrative development through:

- Preparing and qualifying administrative leaders and training employees across state agencies and public institutions.
- Providing scientific and technical consultations to government entities to resolve administrative and financial challenges.
- Preparing and publishing research and studies related to administrative development and the improvement of work systems.
- Organizing conferences, seminars, and workshops covering various aspects of human resource development and management sciences.

== Colleges and academic centers ==
The institute features a comprehensive academic structure designed to meet the needs of the labor market and the government sector. It comprises 11 colleges and centers distributed between the main center and its branches, 8 scientific departments, and offers 13 academic programs. Prominent colleges and centers include:

- College of Administrative Sciences (with branches in Al Hudaydah, Taiz, and Ibb).
- College of Information Technology (with branches in Al Hudaydah and Taiz).
- College of Graduate Studies (grants Master's degrees in specializations such as Accounting and Management Information Systems).
- Intermediate Diplomas Center (available at the main center and branches like Al Hudaydah and Ibb).

== Branches ==
The institute has expanded to cover training and academic needs across several Yemeni governorates, maintaining 6 main branches:

- Main Center – Amanat Al Asimah (Sanaa - Al-Adl Street).
- Aden Governorate Branch.
- Ibb Governorate Branch.
- Hadhramaut Governorate Branch.
- Al Hudaydah Governorate Branch.
- Saada Governorate Branch.

== Academic statistics ==
According to recent data, the institute records the following statistics:

- Students: Approximately 4,900.
- Faculty members: Over 187 academics and experts.
- Colleges and Centers: 11.
- Academic Programs: 13 academic and training programs.

== Activities and scientific journal ==
The institute regularly organizes specialized training programs for various government agencies, such as the Ministry of Civil Service, the General Telecommunications Corporation, the General Authority for Zakat, and the Postal Service. These programs range from advanced management skills and artificial intelligence applications to improving citizen services and human resource management. The institute also publishes its own "Scientific Journal," dedicated to publishing peer-reviewed research in the administrative and economic sciences.

== Notable deans ==
- Dr. Wahiba Fara'a: (A Yemeni academic and politician, and the first female minister in Yemen) served as the Dean of the National Institute of Administrative Sciences from 2006 to 2011.
- Dr. Mohammed Deifallah Al-Qatabri: Current dean of the institute.

== See also ==
- Education in Yemen
- Ministry of Higher Education and Scientific Research (Yemen)
- Sanaa University
