= Harra es-Sawad =

Volcanic field in Yemen

Coordinates: 13.5800°N 46.1200°E

- Shuqra Volcanic Field

Highest point
- Elevation: 1,737 m (5,699 ft)

Geography
- Location: Yemen

Geology
- Mountain type: Volcanic Field
- Last eruption: 1253

Harra es-Sawad, or the "Shuqra Volcanic Field", is a large trachybasaltic volcanic field that runs along the Gulf of Aden. Nearby is the city of Shuqrah.

== Morphology ==
The field stretches for around 100 km (62 miles), contains around 100 volcanic cones, and is orientated on a WSW-ENE line. This has produced a 40 km × 95 km (25 by 59 miles) lava field, which is mostly Holocene in age, and covers faulted basement limestone. Many of the fields cones are young and uneroded.

== History ==
The only eruption that has been noted in historical times occurred in 1253. This eruption was a large VEI 3 eruption, although it was poorly documented. Given the age of the field, other eruptions may have occurred in the recent past.

== See also ==
- Hadhramaut Mountains
- List of volcanoes in Yemen
- Sarat Mountains
