= Yemen College of Middle Eastern Studies =

- Type: Private
- Established: 1989
- President: Sabri Saleem
- Location: Sanaa, Yemen
- Campus: Urban
- Website: ycmes.org

The Yemen College of Middle Eastern Studies, commonly referred to as YCMES and formerly known as Yemen Language Center, is a private college located in Sanaa, the capital and largest city of Yemen.

== History ==
The Yemen College of Middle Eastern Studies was created from the standing buildings and reputation of the Yemen Language Center (YLC). The Yemen Language Center was founded in 1989 by Sabri Saleem, the former Associate Country Director for the US Peace Corps for twelve years.

In 1993, the YLC expanded by founding the Yemen Center for Arab Studies, adding academic courses to those of language instruction. In 2006, to accommodate the increasing academic interest in Arabic and the Middle East, the Yemen Language Center and the Yemen Center for Arab Studies transitioned into the YCMES.

The YCMES is a project of president and founder Sabri Saleem, and Dr. Steve Caton, the honorary Dean of YCMES and Professor of Contemporary Arab Studies in the Anthropology Department at Harvard University. Dr. Caton has also directed Harvard's Center for Middle Eastern Studies at Harvard since 2004.

The school was established as a coeducational institution, and residences are shared by male and female alike, although they live on separate floors.

The educational programming of the YLC continues to provide Arabic instruction as the YCMES prepares for its inaugural semester in Fall 2008.

== Location ==
Yemen is a traditional Middle Eastern country located on the southwest corner of the Arabian Peninsula. Compared to other Arabic-speaking countries, Yemen has one of the lowest-percentages of English speakers. This lack foreign language fluency by the native Yemenis, paired with the fact that the Arabic spoken in Yemen is conservative and close to the formal dialect, provides a location for studying Arabic.

YCMES is located on the 26 September Street, close to the Yemeni Parliament building, a short walk from Tahrir Square, the transportation hub of Sanaa.

== Facilities ==
The YCMES owns three buildings used for housing. The 26th of September Dormitory, and the Guest House are located near the Main College Building on 26 September. The Bab al-Sabah dormitory is located in the Old City.

=== The Markez: 26 September Dormitory ===
The six-story 26 September Dormitory is composed of two buildings connected by a small, enclosed bridge (referred to as the YCMES’ own "Shahara Bridge"). It contains over 30 dormitory rooms, accommodating up to 90 students in singles to quintuples. Shared bathrooms are on each floor as well as communal kitchens on the first and top floors.

=== Bab Al-Sabah Dormitory ===
The Bab Al-Sabah dormitory is located in the old Goldseller’s District on the edge of the Old City. It has a traditional Yemeni exterior. The house contains ten rooms accommodating up to 25 students in singles and shared rooms.

=== Guest House ===
The Guest House is located down the street from the 26th of September Dormitory and is used for housing professors, senior students, and other visitors.

== Academic Facilities ==
The newest addition to the YCMES campus, the Main College Building, is located next to the Prime Minister’s office. This is the largest site owned by the college, and includes a garden acting as the YCMES “quad.” The administrative part of the building contains offices for the president, deans, financial officers, program officers, and other administrators.

=== Library ===
The new Yemen College of Middle Eastern Studies library houses a substantial collection of Arabic-language reference works, with a particular focus on history and geography of the Middle East, and a growing collection of English-language texts on the history and politics of the contemporary Middle East. The collection is valuable to Arabic language students as it contains a variety of Arab-language textbooks, short stories, children’s books, periodicals and magazines. The collection’s open stacks are searchable via an online public access catalogue, and the YCMES is currently developing an interlibrary loan system in collaboration with the French Institute and the American Institute of Yemeni Studies’ libraries, both of which specialize in Yemeni and Arabian Peninsula social sciences, history, and archaeology.

== See also ==
- Education in Yemen
