= Muhammad al-Gharbi Amran =

Yemeni short story writer, novelist, Politician

Muhammad al-Gharbi Amran (born 1958) is a Yemeni short story writer, novelist and politician. He is known for his short stories and for his controversial novel Mushaf Ahmar. He is also a former deputy mayor of Sanaa.

He was born in Dhamar and studied history at university, obtaining a master's degree in the subject. He has written five collections of short stories, starting with Al-sharashif (1997). His stories have been translated into English and Italian, and have featured in foreign-language anthologies such as Oranges in the Sun (2007) and Perle dello Yemen (2009).

al-Gharbi Amran served as the deputy mayor of Sanaa for several years in the latter half of the 2010s. His first novel Mushaf Ahmar (Red Book) was published from Beirut in January 2010. The novel deals with vexing social problems like extremism and the oppression of women in Yemeni society. Two months after the publication of the book, Amran was relieved of his duties as deputy mayor. Amran claimed that this was due to the controversial content of his novel, although this was denied by the authorities. Later in 2010, a group of intellectuals boycotted the 27th Sanaa Book Fair, accusing the organizers of banning several books including Mushaf Ahmar. This too was denied by Yemen's Book Authority.

al-Gharbi Amran heads a Yemeni literary club called el-Maqah.

== Books ==
- Al-sharashif (1997), short stories
- Al-zill al-ari (1998), short stories
- Harim azzakum Allah (2001), short stories
- Khitan Bilqis (2002), short stories
- Madhana sawda (2004), short stories
- Mushaf Ahmar (2010), novel
