= Human rights in Yemen =

Human rights in Yemen are seen as problematic. The security forces have been responsible for torture, inhumane treatment and even extrajudicial executions. In recent years there has been some improvement, with the government signing several international human rights treaties, and even appointing a woman, Dr. Wahiba Fara’a, to the role of Minister of the State of Human Rights.

Other sources state that many problems persist alongside allegations that these reforms have not been fully implemented and that abuses still run rampant, especially in the areas of women's rights, freedom of the press, torture and police brutality. There are arbitrary arrests of citizens as well as arbitrary searches of homes. Prolonged pretrial detention is a serious problem, and judicial corruption, inefficiency, and executive interference undermine due process. Freedom of speech, the press and religion are all restricted. In 2018 and 2019, numerous sources, including the United Nations described the human rights situation in Yemen as being the worst in the world.

== Treaties ==
Yemen is a party to the following human rights agreements:

- The Convention on the Elimination of Discrimination Against Women (CEDAW)
- The Convention Relating the Status of Refugees
- The Convention on the Elimination of Racial Discrimination
- The International Covenant on Civil and Political Rights
- The International Covenant on Economic, Social and Cultural Rights
- The International Convention on the Ban of Genocide
- The International Convention on War Crimes and Crimes Against Humanity
- The International Convention on Women's Political Rights
- The Convention on Marriage Consent and Minimum Marriage Age and Marriage Contracts Registration
- The Convention on the Ban of Human Trading and Exploitation
- The International Convention on the Prohibition of Racial Discrimination
- The International Convention on the Rights of the Child
- The International Convention on Anti-Torture, Cruel Treatment and Inhumanity
- The 1994 Geneva Agreement and their 1997 Annexed Protocol

== Women's rights ==
Despite the Yemeni Constitution of 1994, which stipulates equal rights for Yemeni citizens, women are still struggling with various constraints and secondary status. Yemen's Personal Status Law in particular, which covers matters of marriage, divorce, child custody and inheritance, gives women fewer rights than men, excludes women from decision making, and deprives them of access to, and control over, resources and assets.

The right to divorce is not given to women equally. It is far more difficult for a woman to divorce a man. A man may divorce a woman at will. While a man may divorce without justifying his action in court, a woman must present adequate justification. Women face many practical, social, and financial negative considerations in the divorce procedure. One significant case to gain worldwide publicity was that of Nujood Ali, who succeeded in obtaining a divorce at age ten, with the help of a prominent female Yemeni lawyer who agreed to represent her.

Yemen has one of the worst records of child marriage in the world, with UNICEF recording in 2005 that 48.4% of Yemeni women currently aged 20–24 had been married before they were 18 (and 14% before the age of 15). Prior to the unification of Yemen in 1990, the law set the minimum age of marriage at 16 in South Yemen and 15 in the north. After unification, the law was set at 15. In 1999, the civil status law was amended and the minimum age was abolished. In April 2010, a controversial new law set the minimum age for marriage at 17. The bill was actively opposed by conservative parliamentarians on the basis that fixing a minimum age of marriage contradicts Islam. Other factors contributing to child marriage include embedded cultural traditions, economic pressures on girls' parents, and the value placed on young girls' virginity and the consequent desire to protect them from sexual relationships outside of marriage.

Other potential factors include older husbands' desire for young, submissive wives, and the belief that young girls are less likely to be carriers of HIV and AIDS. The dangers of early marriage to girls include the increased health risks associated with early pregnancies, social isolation, an increased risk of exposure to domestic violence and a cutting short of girls' education, further contributing to the 'feminisation of poverty'.

Women's access to maternal health care is severely restricted. In most cases, husbands decide women's fertility. It is hard for women to obtain contraception, or to take an operation for treatment without a husband's permission. Yemen's high child mortality rate and the fourth fastest growing population in the world are attributed to a lack of women's decision-making in their pregnancy and access to healthcare services.

Women are vulnerable to sexual assault by prison guards, and there is a lower, if any, punishment for violence against women than men. The law stipulates protection of women from domestic violence, but in fact there are few protections for women who suffer from domestic violence and no systematic investigation of such occurrences has been conducted. Spousal abuse or domestic violence is not generally reported to the police because of social norms and customs, meaning that women remain silent under these abuses.

== Freedom of the press ==
In 2005, Yemen ranked 136th of 167 nations in terms of press freedom. The government holds a monopoly on all television and radio and bans journalists for publishing "incorrect" information. In 2001, journalists at the newspaper Al-Shura received 80 lashes for defaming Abdul Majeed al-Zindani, the leader of the country's largest Islamist party. The newspaper was also shut down. According to Human Rights Watch, "Under the regulations for the 1990 Press Law, issued in 1993 and 1998, newspapers have to apply to the Ministry of Information for annual renewal of their license... in mid-2000 only about half of Yemen's 200 publications had been granted a license."

The UN Human Rights Office (OHCHR) documented several human rights violations against journalists in Yemen that included killings, disappearances and death sentences committed by the parties warring in the Yemeni armed conflict. On June 2, 2020, in Dar Sa’ad district, AFP journalist Nabeel Al-Qitee’e was assassinated in front of his home. On 11 April 2020, four journalists were sentenced to death and six others were jailed by the Specialized Criminal Court in the capital of Sana’a, controlled by Houthi rebels. Since the start of the conflict in 2015, 24 media organizations have been seized, 26 TV channels and newspaper agencies were shut down. According to OHCHR, 357 human rights violations and abuses were documented to have taken place against journalists, including 184 arrests and detentions, 28 killings, 45 assaults, 2 forced disappearances and one abduction.

On 6 November 2020, Human Rights Watch revealed that four journalists arbitrarily detained by Houthi authorities in Yemen since 2015 were charged with death penalty and given inadequate medical care during imprisonment. The four detainees were arrested and sentenced to death without a fair trial on 11 April 2020, by a Houthi-controlled court in Sanaa. The court charged the journalists for treason and spying for foreign states considering their journalistic work.

In September 2025, a lawyer known for representing detained journalists, Abdulmajid Sabra, was himself detained. He remains imprisoned without charge as of September 2026.

== Freedom of religion ==
The Constitution provides for freedom of religion, and the Government generally respected this right in practice; however, there were some restrictions. The Constitution declares that Islam is the state religion, and that Shari'a (Islamic law) is the source of all legislation. Government policy continued to contribute to the generally not free practice of religion; however, there were some restrictions. Muslims and followers of religious groups other than Islam are free to worship according to their beliefs, but the Government prohibits conversion from Islam and the proselytization of Muslims.

Although relations among religious groups continued to contribute to religious freedom, there were some reports of societal abuses and discrimination based on religious belief or practice. There were isolated attacks on Jews and some prominent Zaydi Muslims felt targeted by government entities for their religious affiliation. Government military reengagement in the Saada governorate caused political, tribal, and religious tensions to reemerge in January 2007, following the third military clash with rebels associated with the al-Houthi family, who adhere to the Zaydi school of Shi'a Islam.

Since the start of the Shia insurgency, many Zaidis accused of supporting Al-Houthi, have been arrested and held without charge or trial. According to the US Department of State, International Religious Freedom Report 2007, "Some Zaydis reported harassment and discrimination by the Government because they were suspected of sympathizing with the al-Houthis. However, it appears the Government's actions against the group were probably politically, not religiously, motivated".

== LGBT rights ==
Homosexuality is illegal in Yemen in accordance with the country's Shari'ah legal system. LGBT persons in Yemen are likely to suffer discrimination, legal, and social challenges. Punishments for homosexuality range from flogging to death. Yemen is one of the seven countries to apply a death penalty for consensual sexual acts between adults of the same sex.

Gay and lesbian websites are blocked by the government.

The official position is that there are no gays in Yemen. As of 2007, there was no public or semi-public space for gays as in western countries.

As a result of Sharia, LGBT people are killed in attacks.

== Human trafficking ==
The United States Department of State 2013 Trafficking in Persons report has classified Yemen as a Tier 3 country, meaning that its government does not fully comply with the minimum standards against human trafficking and is not making significant efforts to do so.

== Violations of children's rights during civil war ==
Amnesty International denounced the recruitment of young boys under the age of 17 at hands of the Yemen's Houthi armed group to fight as child soldiers on the front lines of the Yemeni Civil War. In mid-February 2017, four boys, aged between 15 and 17, were recruited by Huthis in Sana'a; the total numbers of the boys recruited is unknown. Since the children have been excited to shoot Kalashnikovs and guns and wear military uniforms, Houthis have run local centers that hold activities such as prayers, sermons and lectures where they have been encouraged to join front-line battles to defend Yemen against Saudi Arabia. As the report clarified, they always take one recruit from each family; and when son dies, a monthly salary, estimated between 20,000 and 30,000 Yemeni Riyals, has been given to the family. According to the UN agencies, nearly 1,500 cases of children were recruited by all parties to the conflict since March 2015.

Saudi Arabia and the United Arab Emirates hired child soldiers from Sudan (especially from Darfur), and Yemen to fight against Houthis during the Yemeni Civil War (2015-present).

British SAS special forces are allegedly involved in training child soldiers in Yemen. Reportedly at least 40% of soldiers fighting for the Saudi-led coalition are children.

Saudi Arabia is also hiring Yemeni child soldiers to guard Saudi border against Houthis.

In June 2019, Mike Pompeo, the US Secretary of State, blocked the inclusion of Saudi Arabia on the US list of countries that recruit child soldiers, dismissing his experts' findings that a Saudi-led coalition has been using children in Yemen's civil war.

== Labor ==
Since 2015 the ILO works with the United Nations Development Programme (UNDP) to create new jobs and generate income in Yemen. The World Bank, UN, European Union and Islamic Development Bank joined the ILO in order to arrange multiple Damage and Needs Assessment (DNA) reports. The ILO implemented the Labour Market Information System in collaboration with the Ministry of Social Affairs and Labour to support employment policy funded by Silatech of Qatar, Swiss Agency for Development and Cooperation (SDC) and ILO funds. The projects “Entrepreneurship education- Know about business” and “Women Entrepreneurship Programme in Yemen” were financed by the Social Fund for Development to provide access to fundamental business skills. In addition, the ILO partnered with the UNDP to support the access to work for young people and implement the project “Livelihood and Economic Recovery”.

== Secret prisons ==
The UAE runs secret prisons in Yemen where prisoners are forcibly disappeared and tortured. The US also admitted to interrogating prisoners but denied "any participation in or knowledge of human rights abuses".

== See also ==
- Democracy in the Middle East and North Africa
- Elections in Yemen
- Hooria Mashhour, former Minister of Human Rights
- Human rights in the Middle East
- Human rights in Islamic countries
