= List of volcanoes in Yemen =

This is a list of active and extinct volcanoes in Yemen.

Name	Elevation		Location	Last eruption
Name	meters	feet	Coordinates	Last eruption
Bir Borhut	-	-	15.55°N 50.63°E	905
Hanish	422	1,384	13.72°N 42.73°E	Holocene
Harra es-Sawad	1,737	5,699	13.58°N 46.12°E	1253
Harra of Arhab	3,100	10,170	15.63°N 44.08°E	500
Harra of Bal Haf	233	764	14.05°N 48.33°E	Holocene
Harras of Dhamar	3,500	11,483	14.57°N 44.67°E	1937
Jabal el-Marha	2,650	8,694	15.28°N 44.22°E	Holocene
Jabal Hamman Demt	1,500	4,921	14.05°N 44.75°E	-
Jabal Haylan	1,550	5,085	15.43°N 44.78°E	1200 BC
Jebel Tair	244	801	15.70°N 41.742°E	1332
Jebel at Tair	244	801	15.55°N 41.82°E	2007
Jebel Zubair	191	627	15.05°N 42.18°E	2011
Zukur	624	2,047	14.02°N 42.75°E	Holocene

== See also ==
- Geography of Yemen
- Geology of Yemen
- Mountains in the Arabian Peninsula
