= Education in the Middle East and North Africa =

Education in MENA

The Universal Declaration of Human Rights has emphasized education's importance as a fundamental human right and a necessary element of development. Education equips the emerging labor force with the literacy, numeracy, and problem-solving skills needed to participate in economic development.

Research has shown that developing countries that invested in family planning, healthcare, and education have experienced more rapid economic development than those that have not.

The Middle East and North Africa (MENA) region has made substantial investments in education over the past several decades, achieving near-universal access and closing gender gaps at most levels of schooling, yet these gains have not translated into comparable improvements in learning outcomes or economic opportunity.

== History of education in the Middle East and North Africa ==
Education in the Middle East and North Africa developed through local reform initiatives, missionary and humanitarian projects, and colonial education systems. After independence, governments increasingly used education for nation-building and economic development.

=== Colonial period ===
Colonial authorities introduced compulsory modern education in the Arab region, but local access to formal education remained limited. Modern schooling, particularly European-language education, was restricted to a small number of students. Access to European-style education remained concentrated among those who could afford schooling or had other advantages, contributing to the development of an educated elite.

Western educational systems also spread through missionary and humanitarian projects and colonial administrative policy, with religious missions and private associations contributing to girls’ education, the spread of European languages, history and philosophy, and traditions of liberal education.

=== Post-colonial period ===
==== Historical perspective ====
In the Middle East and North Africa, during the post-colonial era, education spread as a result of the significant social changes and the rise of the indigenous élite as a ruling power. The willingness of national governments to build a strong nation made the acquisition of literacy a necessary skill for maximizing human potential. Most scholars and policy makers in the region have argued that education is the cornerstone of society's economic growth and expansion. They stress the importance of investing in education in order to promote sustained economic development, although despite significant expansion of educational reach and services, unemployment remains high

In the post-colonial period, the dominant pattern has been the governments’ control of education. Free education was promoted by many leaders, including Egypt's Gamal Abdel Nasser, as a critical aspect of nation-building, and promised that each graduate would find a position in the public sector. The expansion of primary, secondary and tertiary education has paralleled the rapid population growth since the 1960s. Between 1965 and 1990, the percentage of students enrolled in primary education increased from 61% to 98%.

Despite the introduction of higher education colonialism, the pace of enrollment at the university level increased significantly immediately following independence. In 1939, there were no more than nine regional universities, and by 1960, twenty. States with the highest numbers of enrolled students included Egypt, Syria, Lebanon, and Iraq.

In the conservative regimes of Saudi Arabia and Yemen, European-style education was slow to emerge. Regimes were careful to expose the students to doctrines that might contradict with the Islamic culture, although Kuwait served as an exception. The Persian Gulf states have since introduced far-reaching educational reforms, with the awareness that only by investing in their own human capital will they see economic development continue beyond the oil boom years. Recently, Saudi Arabia's King Abdullah has been featured in the international press for his efforts to establish multiple centers of learning, with a mixed-gender Western model.

==== Post-independence challenges ====
Problems in expanding access to education were common to all MENA countries in the post-independence years. Affordable education did not necessarily reduce the number of uneducated children as a result of the population boom. Similarly, the educational system proved to be inadequate as classrooms, led by overworked and often underqualified teachers, were crowded with children. Students who moved through the strictly exam-based system were, and often continue to be, ill-equipped with the skills necessary for university-level education and employment.

Other problems emerged as the state attempted to unify multiple systems under the state: European-style and Islamic, public and private, instruction in Arabic and others in a foreign language, usually French or English. As a result, while some Islamic schools were closed, others became part of larger universities. As an example, the Zaytuna, a traditional Islamic school in Tunis, was incorporated to the school of Shari'a of the University of Tunis.

Another pattern seen under post-colonial government control of education was the Arabization of educational institutions. Schools that during colonial rule taught through the medium of a foreign language, began to teach in Arabic. As a consequence, students' opportunities to master a foreign language decreased in countries such as Syria, where introduction to a European second language occurred only in the secondary schools, not during primary education.

Students who wanted to pursue their studies abroad had to rely on family wealth or government scholarships. Those who were not able to master a foreign language faced serious obstacles. However, as the best-quality education could only be obtained in private schools, a wealthy educated élite remained. The intelligentsia class continued to master foreign languages and to enjoy employment advantages. By contrast, the larger part of society had to rely on the government's educational facilities and dwindling opportunities in public sector positions.

== Conflict and education in the Middle East ==
A Strategic Foresight Group report on the cost of conflict in the Middle East found that the average monthly salary of school teachers in Iraq declined sharply after the 2003 invasion of Iraq, and that almost 30–40% of students stayed home from school or university out of fear. Militants also deliberately targeted educational establishments following the war, killing an estimated 240 to 380 Iraqi academics and nearly 500 students between 2003 and 2008.

In the Lebanon 2006 war, approximately 15% of the country's public schools were damaged or destroyed, with similar losses among private schools, contributing to an estimated $87 million in direct and indirect impact on the education sector.

During the Second Intifada, more than 226,000 Palestinian children and over 9,300 teachers were unable to reach their classrooms due to curfews or closures. At least 580 schools had been closed as of November 2002.

== Literacy rates ==
As a result of government investment in education, the average of educational attainment of the labor force increased. Though mostly regarded as a symbol of national achievement rather than a financial goal, high literacy rates had more than doubled in the countries of the Middle East and North Africa in the period spanning from 1960 to 1995. Despite the improvement of literacy levels in the region, there was a discrepancy between the countries with a significant urban population, in which literacy rates had marked a steady increase and the predominantly rural countries where the percentage of illiteracy was remarkably high.

Due to the rising number of young students, especially in rural areas, countries such as Yemen, Egypt and Morocco face a serious obstacle towards achieving universal basic education. In Egypt, guaranteeing education for those aged below 15 is an enormous challenge as more than third of its population is between 6 and 14 with a concentration in rural areas. In the mountainous areas of Yemen, despite substantial efforts to build new schools or repair existing ones, classes may meet outdoors.

Further attempts at raising literacy rates are being processed in the MENA region, with a particular emphasis on educating women in rural areas, where the level of illiteracy in general is high, especially among females. According to the World Bank report in 1999, in the rural areas of Morocco, only one woman out of ten can read and write. The United Nations Education, Scientific and Cultural Organization reported that over seventy-five million women and forty-five million men across the Middle East and North Africa region were illiterate.

The quality of education is a crucial issue in economic development. In order to evaluate the quality of education, it is important to understand and evaluate its impacts. Such a process can be conducted through comparative studies both within the MENA region and internationally. However, as only Iran and Jordan have participated in recent international assessment studies, the available data on the quality of education in the MENA region is very low. Both Jordan, which participated in the 1991 International Assessment of Educational Progress, and Iran, which did so in the 1995 Third International Mathematics and Sciences Study, showed a very low level in math and science, but with the greatest increase from 1995 to 2011.

More importantly, educational systems in MENA do not strongly rely on the inculcation of cognitive problem-solving skills. They are rather encouraged to memorize answers to a limited number of problems in order to pass one exam after another. As a result, they are rewarded for being passive rather than active learners, and in the end graduate into a job-market that values creativity and problem-solving, partially explaining the staggering 25% youth unemployment rate in the Middle East, the highest of any region worldwide. The costs of youth exclusion, including youth unemployment, have been estimated to reach as high as US$53 billion in Egypt (17% of GDP) and US$1.5 billion in Jordan (7% of GDP).

Some indicators, such as the available sources of data on individual students or the patterns of expenditure in primary schools, can be helpful in determining the quality of education in MENA. In many MENA primary schools, students have access to a single textbook in every subject each year. This implies that the book itself is the only source of information. Correspondingly, the development of cognitive skills tends to be slow and depends on the student's personal efforts to assimilate new information, hence progress. In addition, such a process can even be slower because of the absence of other reading materials and video programs that may provide further illustrations and make the studied topic clear and understandable.

From a different perspective, countries in the Persian Gulf states spent four times more on students in higher education than on students in basic school. Tunisia, Jordan, and Morocco spent correspondingly about 8, 14, and 15 times more on a student in university than on a student in compulsory education. Though it might be argued that this is due to the costs of higher education, governments that spend more than ten times per student in higher education tend to ignore the importance of compulsory education's importance in personal and intellectual development.

In the Arab world, the low quality of the educational system is not due to the lack of funding but results from the inadequate management of the available monetary resources directed at improving education in the region. The Education Performance Index that measures the quality of education in the developing countries conveyed a discrepancy between the different countries in the region. They varied in the ways of exploiting the advantages of economic potential for the benefit of their people. Countries such as Tunisia succeeded in investing more than six per cent of its GNP in free public education. As a consequence, more than 1.4 million students could enjoy a free and compulsory education in 1991. In other countries such as Kuwait, Saudi Arabia and Qatar, despite the available financial resources, basic education was not improved. This can be interpreted as being the result of the low net enrollment rate. Moreover, while the gender gap in compulsory education in Saudi Arabia and Kuwait is not very high, Qatar suffers a gender gap of 20 per cent in students enrollment in basic education.

== Gender ==
The MENA region has substantial gender disparities in education, relative to other regions at similar income levels. Researchers have linked this to the region’s economic conditions and traditional expectations of men’s and women’s roles.

While some women perceive that education is their gateway to a better life in which they are able to understand their human rights and subsequently protect themselves against gender discrimination, others believe that educated women are more successful in raising a new generation.

In the first half of the 1990s, Muslim states increased girls enrollment in primary schools by two percent, a rate four times higher than the average rate of school-age girls enrollment in developing countries. The rise of girls participation in primary schools aimed at wiping the widespread claims that Islamic rules restricted female access to education.

In the Islamic Republic of Iran, the primary school enrollment rate for girls has increased from 80 to 96 percent in 1986. Similarly, in rural areas, girls enrollment in primary schools has climbed from 60 to 80 percent in the late 1990s. In the case of Iran, political commitment to achieve a universal compulsory education in Iran has influenced educational quality. Correspondingly, gender gap in school enrollment has significantly decreased.

In addition, several regimes in the Arab world have stressed the importance to improve female's access to education and attempted to reduce gender gaps at different educational levels. Indeed, it is predicted that by the year 2010, Arab countries can reach 70 percent of literacy rate as result of the sustained improvement of education especially with regards to women. Tunisia stands as an illustrative example of a successful policy that has started in 1956. It aimed at reducing gender gaps. The government's liberal policy towards women has influenced women's status in the country and reduced gender inequality in access to education.

The significant shifts in girls enrollment rates in compulsory schools were experienced by other countries in the MENA region. From 1960 to 1988, girls enrollment rates in Syria, Libya and Iraq have climbed correspondingly from 44 percent to 94 percent (Syria), from 26 to 90 percent (Libya) and from 39 to 88 percent (Iraq). According to the World Bank, the wider gender gaps across the MENA region are found in Yemen, Morocco and Egypt. In Egypt, more than 600.000 girls aged between 6 and 10 do not go to school. The majority of these uneducated girls are concentrated in rural areas, especially in Upper Egypt. Such phenomenon resulted from the low quality of the national educational system and its provided services in rural areas. This was also backed by the socioeconomic difficulties in the rural areas of Egypt, where it is very difficult to afford for basic educational materials.

== Problems and recommended changes ==
According to the 2002 Arab Human Development Report, “the most worrying aspect of the crisis in education is education’s inability to provide the requirements for the development of Arab societies.” Despite that both secondary and higher education are regarded as the most suitable sources that provide training and expertise for the future labor force, access to colleges or universities is still limited. In cases when education is available, it suffers from the low quality of its educational system, lack of educational materials or qualified teachers.

The financial problem emanates from the region itself: the intervention of government to provide a free education has started to become burdensome as result of the increasing number of students who complete their basic education and seek to further their studies. As a result, the central government faces the challenge to control the unsustainable cost of providing free education for the ever-rising number of students and doing so at different educational levels.

From a different perspective, in the MENA region, despite intensive governmental investments in education in order to improve the efficiency of education and rise the level of academic achievement, the quality of education remains a problem. According to the 1995 World Education Report, although females access to education in the MENA is low when compared to male enrolment rates, the low quality of educational systems in the region affects both males and females. "There remains a pressing quality problem in terms of educational outcomes in the region, with pedagogical methods remaining largely focused on rote memorization rather than applied problem solving and assessment methods."

One way to explain such a phenomenon could be to argue that educational management have not witnessed substantial changes and reforms since the post-independence period. In fact, during the 1950s and the 1960s, educational systems were framed and planned in accordance with the demands of state industries, agriculture and services. The central government used to anticipate the required skills for the future employees before deciding and planning the different educational specializations. No less important, the number of new workers was also determined. Manpower forecasts had to predict the number of employees required in every field prior to students' graduation and completion of secondary or higher education.

Similarly, access to higher education was also monitored by the government. Very often, programs open and close according to governmental planning and in accordance with market demands. Also, the centralized planning helped to determine the necessary technical, manual or professional services that lead to the nation's economic growth. Thereupon, the mobility across specialization was not flexible. In addition, as there was more emphasis on skilled manual and technical professions, academic training was considered irrelevant. Furthermore, entry to the specialized universities of medicine required the acquisition of specific academic experiences taught in specialized secondary schools located in the cities. Consequently, students who lived in urban areas could attend privileged educational institutions. However, students from rural areas very often cannot enjoy the same educational advantages. Most of those willing to continue their education at a higher level are concentrated in the over-crowded technical schools or universities of humanities and social sciences. "Educational outcomes have not provided youth with the skills sought out by private sector employers in the region."

=== Recommended changes ===
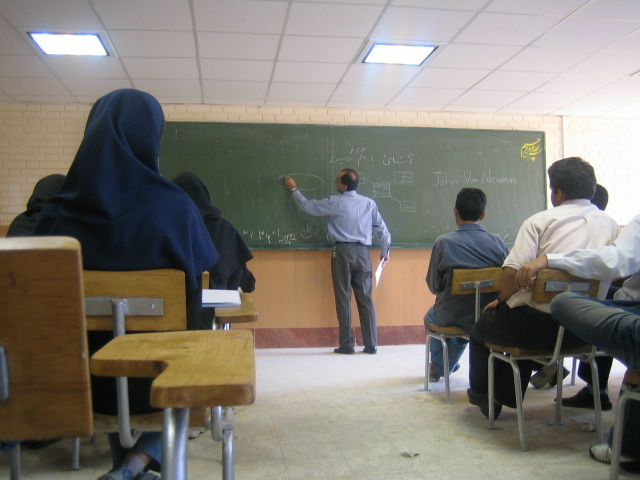
An Iranian university class

Stephan P. Heyneman identifies six major areas for change:

1. Meaningful compulsory education A meaningful compulsory education implies the necessity to treat 'basic education' and 'compulsory education' equally. This means that education should be universal during the period of compulsory basic education. Compulsory education needs to be universal for all children regardless of their social class, gender, or ethnic group. Such a process requires the redefinition of examinations goals. This signifies that exams need to be used as an evaluative tool rather than a means by which students are selected according to their memorization skills.
2. Coherent quality assurance mechanisms There are four mechanisms that enable the assessment of education's quality. They include "curricular objectives, examinations and other assessment, teaching materials and classroom teaching". However, in the MENA region, schools lack the resources to facilitate fulfilling educational goals. For instance, textbooks are inadequately organized in ways that do not consider students' varying educational capabilities. Consequently, the coordination between curricular objectives, mechanisms used by teachers, and appropriate selection of examinations can be efficient in conveying a functional and coherent educational system.
3. Professionalization of teachers In the MENA region, teachers are not selected for their competence, creativity, and teaching performance. Rather, they are identified by virtue of their educational attainment. However, salary scales do not differ between teachers at different levels of experience. This very fact has discouraged proactive improvement of teaching and subsequently has reduced the quality of teaching in general. An effective solution to such a challenge would be to introduce continuing evaluations and examinations in order to assess teachers' performance in the classroom. Instructors who succeed in these evaluative examinations may move to a higher salary scale. This process would not only motivate teachers to perform but would positively influence the quality of education in general.
4. Educational materials In the countries of the Middle East and North Africa, there is a general consensus that educational facilities are rare and inappropriately used. However, due to the changing nature of market demand, there is an urge necessity to provide students with professional and technical skills. Indeed, introducing computer software educational programs should be encouraged, organized and implemented. It is suggested that such a process would produce an up-to-date educational system that produces an internationally competitive labor force. Consequently, this does not only improve the quality of education but also creates a valuable and efficient work force.
5. Higher education Most MENA countries have not changed the policies whereby they manage their higher education since the intervention times of central governments in the 1960s and 1970s. In other terms, the financing and delivery procedures have been identical for more than thirty years. This explains the reason why the quality of higher education has decreased. Nevertheless, in order to avoid such state of stagnation in higher educational institutions, there is a need to improve educational delivery materials through the use of modernized teaching strategies, raising access to higher education while providing both qualitative and structural reforms.
6. Educational information Information about the quality of education in MENA is scarce and the available data is often inadequate and unreliable. Nevertheless, in order to be able to adapt to the global open market, governments in the region need to encourage the use of statistics and different data analysis tools that aim at uncovering the status of education for both local responsible authorities and international bodies. Such a process allows an effective assessment and evaluation of the strengths and weaknesses of education in the region. Conversely, as a result of the shortage of information about these evaluative data, it is very difficult to determine the reasons for the failure of educational systems in MENA.

== See also ==
- Education of females
- Education reform
- Educational evaluation
- Educational institution
- Educational research
- Middle East Youth Initiative
- Middle East economic integration

Education by country

- Education in Algeria
- Education in Bahrain
- Education in Egypt
- Education in Iran
- Education in Iraq
- Education in Israel
- Education in Jordan
- Education in Kuwait
- Education in Lebanon
- Education in Libya
- Education in Morocco
- Education in Oman
- Education in Palestine
- Education in Qatar
- Education in Saudi Arabia
- Education in Sudan
- Education in Syria
- Education in the United Arab Emirates
- Education in Western Sahara
- Education in Yemen
