= List of universities in Yemen =

Universities in Yemen

This is a list of universities in Yemen.

University	Established	Governorate	Type	Website
Taiz University	1993	Taiz	Public	
Aden University	1970	Aden	Public	www.aden-univ.net/
University of Medical and Applied Sciences	2016	Sana'a	Public	www.21umas.edu.ye
Al-Baydha University	-	Al-Baydha	Public	-
Amran University	-	Amran	Public	-
Dhamar University	1996	Dhamar	Public	-
Hadhramout University	1993	Hadhramout	Public	-
Hodeidah University	1996	Hodeidah	Public	-
Ibb University	1996	Ibb	Public	-
Sana'a University	1970	Sana'a	Public	-
Al-Ahgaff University	1995	Hadhramout	Private	-
Al-Andalous University	2003	Sana'a	Private	-
Iman University	1993	Sana'a	Private	www.jameataleman.org/
Al-Nasser University	2007	Sana'a	Private	www.al-edu.com/en/
Arab Academics University for Science and Technology - Yemen	2020	Sana'a	Private	www.aau-edu.com/en_US/aboutus
Future University - Yemen	2004	Sana'a	Private	https://futureuniversity.com/
Holy Quran & Islamic Sciences University	1994	Hadhramout, Shabwah, Aden	Private	uqs-ye.info/en/Home/CollegePage/9
International University of Technology Twintech - Yemen	-	Sana'a	Private	iutt.edu.ye/
Union University of Science and Technology	-	-	Private	-
Lebanese International University	2006	Sana'a	Private	ye.liu.edu.lb/index/
Al-Arab University	2017	Hadhramout	Private	alarabuni.edu.ye/
Limkokwing University of Creative Technology - Yemen	-	-	Private	-
National University Yemen	-	-	Private	-
Queen Arwa University	1996	Sana'a	Private	qau.edu.ye
Emirates International University	2014	Sana'a	Private	eiu.edu.ye/
Sabaa University	-	-	Private	-
Universal University	-	-	Private	-
University of Islamic and Practical Sciences	-	-	Private	-
University of Modern Sciences	-	-	Private	ums.edu.ye/en/
University of Sciences and Technology	1994	Hadhramout	Private	ust.edu/
University of Sciences and Technology	1994	Taiz	Private	ust.edu/
Yemen and Gulf University for Science and Technology	2014	Sana'a and Hudeidah	Private	www.ygu.edu.ye
