= Dawood Abdulmalek Yahya Al-Hidabi =

Yemeni researcher (born 1955)

Dawood Al-Hidabi
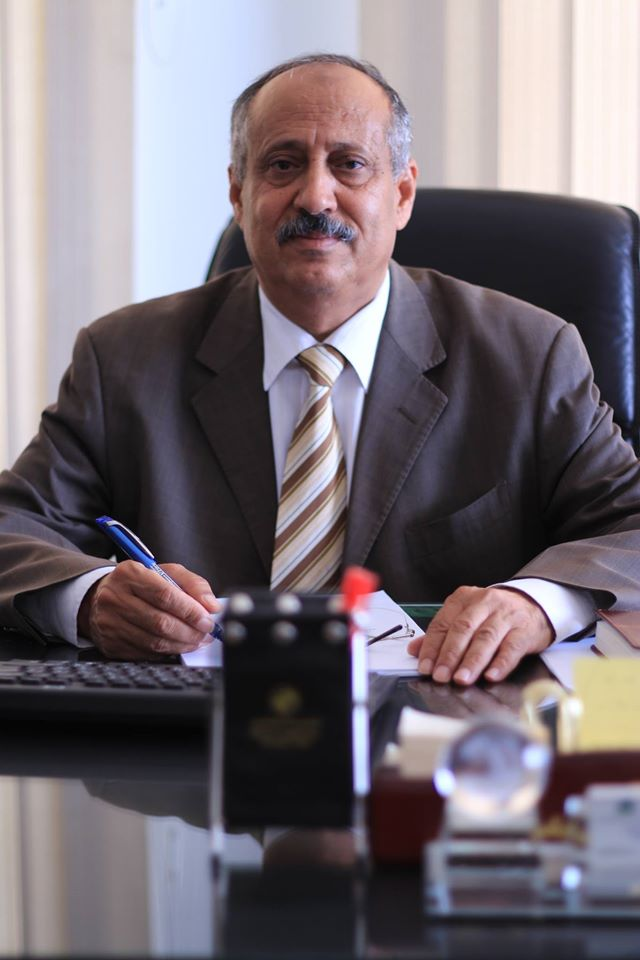
- Dawood Al-Hidabi presenting at his office University of Science and Technology, Yemen
- Born: 7 April 1955 (age 71); Taiz, Yemen
- Scientific career
- Thesis: Philosophy
- Website: https://ust.edu/

Dawood Abdulmalek Yahya Al-Hidabi (born 7 April 1955) is a Yemeni researcher. Founder and Former President of University of Science and Technology || https://ust.edu/, from 1994 to 2007. He is also the Founder and President of the International Association for Talent Development.

== Education ==
Al-Hidabi studied at the Sana'a University (Bachelor of Physics / Chemistry 1977) with honors and Postgraduate Diploma in teaching Physics (P.G.C.E) in 1980 at Jordanhill College, He gained his Master of Science 1982 in Educational Research Methods and Doctor of Philosophy 1986 at University of Stirling

== Career ==
- 1977 - 1978 Inspector of Science, the Ministry of Education, Republic of Yemen.
- 1987 -1992 Assistant Professor, Department of Curricula and Science Teaching methods, Faculty of Education, Sana'a University.
- 1978-1988 Head of Students' affairs, Faculty of Education, Sana'a University.
- 1988 - 1989 Head of Postgraduate Studies Department, Faculty of Education, Sana'a University.
- 1989 - 1990 Head of the Department of Curriculum, Ministry of Education, Republic of Yemen.
- 1990 Visiting professor at Florida State University, U.S.A,.
- 1990 - 1991 Head of curricula and Science Teaching methods, the Faculty of Education, Sana'a University.
- 1990-till now Founder and team leader of establishing Alnahda private school.(both in Arabic and English) from grade 1-12( 3000 students).
- 1991- Educational consultant for Alnahda School( for both sections Arabic and English) Yemen.
- 1992 - 1993 Vice Dean for Academic Affairs, Faculty of Education, Sana'a University.
- 1992 -1994 Dean of the National college of Science and Technology, Sana'a, Republic of Yemen.
- 1996 -1998 Head of Curricula and Science Teaching methods, Faculty of Education, Sana'a University.
- 1999 - till now The founder and chairman of the Directorate of Quality Assurance and Development, University of Science and Technology, Yemen.
- 1988-1998 Founder and chairman of the Computer Education Unit, Faculty of Education, Sana'a University.
- 1992-1997 Associate Professor, Department of Curricula and Science Teaching methods, Faculty of Education, Sana'a University.
- 1997- till now Professor of Science Education, Department of Curricula and Teaching methods of science, the Faculty of Education, Sana'a University, in.
- 1994 - 2007 The founding president of the University of Science and Technology, Sana'a, Republic of Yemen, from.
- 2008 – till now Vice-Chairman of the Board of the Directors, Al- Mawarid Company for Education and Health Services, Sana'a - Republic of Yemen.
- 2010-2012 Managing director, Hospital of the University of Science and Technology, Sana'a – Yemen.
- 2008 – till now Chairman and the supervisor of Teaching and Learning Center, University of Science and Technology, Yemen || https://ust.edu/.
- 2007-2012 Chairman of Talent Development Center, University of Science and Technology, – Yemen, https://ust.edu/.
- 2013 – till now Chairman of the Board of Trustees, Talent Development Center, University of Science and Technology, Yemen.
- 2012 - till now A member of the Arab Council on gifted and talented students, Amman, Jordan.
- 2010 A member of the permanent steering committee of the Arab International conference of Universities quality Assurance, Arab University association, Amman, Jordan,
- 2010 A member of the permanent steering committee of Turkish- Arab conference of Higher Education, Arab University association and Turkish Higher Education Council,
- Team leader of Internal Audit for Institutional and program audit in University of Science and Technology, Sana'a, Yemen.
- 2009 A member of the Supervising Council of Arab, and International conference on Quality Assurance in Higher Education which is held annually in the Arab World

== Bibliography ==
- Introduction to computer science, Sana'a University, 1997.
- Introduction to Educational Research Methods, with Dr. Mohammad Al-Soofi and Dr. Mahmoud Okasha.
- Concepts of general science and health in the first four grades, teacher training program for the first four grades of basic education, (two years after secondary school), the Republic of Yemen, Ministry Education, with others. 1993.
- Curricula and teaching methods of Science, a teacher training course for the first four grades of basic education, (two years after secondary school), the Ministry of Education, Republic of Yemen, with others. 1995,
- Science curricula and teaching methods of "in-service training center, the Ministry of Education, with: Khalil al-Khalili, and Fathi Malkawi. 1996.
- Arab and Islamic educational Management, " Arab Management Encyclopedia of the Arab Organization for Administrative Development,"

== Academic journals ==
- 1996 Editor-in-Chief of Science and Technology Journal, Yemen.https://journals.ust.edu/
- 1996 – Till now Editor-in-chief of Social Sciences Journal, USTY, Sana'a, Yemen, from. https://journals.ust.edu/
- 2007-till now Editor-in-chief of the Journal of the quality assurance in higher education in the Arab world, Arab universities association, Amman, Jordon.
- 2010 till now Editor in chief of the Arab Journal for Talent Development, Arab Council for Talented and Gifted, Amman, Jordan.
- 1992- till now A Member of the Editorial Board of the Faculty of Education Journal, Sana'a University, from.
- 1993 A Member in the Editorial Board of the Enlightenment journal, Sana'a – Yemen.
- 2007-till now A Member of the Advisory Board of educational and psychological sciences Journal, the Faculty of Education, Bahrain University.
- A Member in the Editorial Board of the private universities association journal, Amman, Jordan.
- A Member in the Advisory Committee for Educational Sciences Journal.
- 2005, till now University of Taiz, Yemen.
- 2003- till now A Member in the Advisory Committee For the Journal of the Educational Research and Development Center, Ministry of Education, Sana'a.
- 2002-till now A Member in the Advisory Board of the magazine, the current affairs, Sana'a – Yemen.
- A Member in the Advisory Board of the Journal, Islamization of the Social Sciences, Amman - Jordan.
- 2013 Editor- in-Chief of the Arab Journal for Science, Mathematics and Technology Education.
