= Al-Jabowbi Castle =

Coordinates: 15°17′30″N 44°11′33″E

- Location within Yemen

General information
- Location: Sana'a, Yemen

Al-Jabowbi Castle is a castle in the Hadda neighborhood of the southern outskirts of Sana'a, Yemen, southwest of the Lebanon Heart Hospital, west of the Lebanese International University and south of the Japanese Embassy and the Hadda Mineral Water Factory.

== See also ==
- List of castles in Yemen
