= Harras of Dhamar =

Volcanic field in Yemen

Coordinates: 14°33′00″N 44°24′06″E

Highest point
- Elevation: 3,500 m (11,500 ft)

Geography
- Location: Dhamar Governorate; Yemen

Geology
- Mountain type: Volcanic field
- Last eruption: 1937

The Harras of Dhamar is a volcanic field in Yemen.

== Morphology and eruption ==
The volcanic field extends 92 km (57 miles) to the south of Dhamar town. The field contains many stratovolcanoes, lava flows, and youthful cones. Basaltic lava flows overlie older Rhyolitic flows. The volcano is responsible for the only 20th-century eruption on the Arabian Peninsula, apparently in 1937. The field is 100 km (62 miles) southeast from Yemen's capital city, Sana'a.

== See also ==
- Global Volcanism Program
- List of volcanoes in Yemen
- Sarat Mountains
