= Hameed Mohammed Yahya Aklan =

Yemeni radiologist and academic

Hameed M. Yahya Aklan
- Born: 25 October 1969 (age 56); Al Jawf, Yemen

Hameed M. Yahya Aklan (born 25 October 1969, in Al-Jawf, Province) is a Yemeni radiologist. He was the rector of the University of Science and Technology, Sana'a from 2009 to 2020.

== Education ==
Hameed M. Aklan completed his secondary education in the science stream with distinction in Omar Al-Mukhtar secondary school in Sana'a. In 1987, he enrolled in an English program in Cambridge city in Britain. After he returned, he was granted a scholarship to study medicine at Karnatak University in Bangalore state in India. Prof. Dr. Aklan graduated from Karnataka University with a bachelor's degree in Medicine and Surgery in 1996. He immediately returned to his home country to begin working as a medical doctor. In 1996, Prof. Dr. Aklan was granted the professional license to practice medicine, after which he was appointed to serve in the Ministry of Health and Population in 1997. He was posted to serve as a physician and director for the Health Center in Hofash district, located in Al-Mahweet province.

In late 1997, he joined the University of Science and Technology as an assistant lecturer and then awarded a grant to complete a study of master's degree in Egypt under a collaborative agreement with the Republic of Egypt. In the year 2000, Prof. Dr. Aklan attained his master's degree from the University of Science and Technology in Yemen in radiology ((Role of Ultrasound and Computed tomography in detection of hepatic lesions)). Five years later, he obtained his PhD from Suez Canal University, Egypt, in diagnostic radiology (( Role of Color Doppler Sonography of the renal arteries in evaluation of renal failure patients)). In 2008, he obtained a post-graduate diploma in leadership and management science for health, funded by USAID.

== Career ==
- 2009 – 2020: Rector of University of Science and Technology, Yemen (USTY).
- 2008: Vice –Rector for Academic Affairs at UST
- 2007: Dean of Faculty of Medicine and Health Sciences at UST
- 2005 – 2007: Vice Dean of the Faculty of Medicine and Health Sciences at the University of Science and Technology (UST), Yemen.
- 1996–1997: General practitioner; worked as GP in the Governorate of Mahweet, Republic Of Yemen.

== Achievements ==
Hameed Aklan is the president of the University of Science and Technology which under his leadership has received an investment award for several years as the best private university in Yemen, the innovation and excellence award in distance education(ANODE) in 2012 from the Arab Network for Open and Distance Education, membership of the International Council for Distance Education(ICDE) in 2013, sixth place amid all international and American universities in the biomedical engineering project presented by students of engineering faculty at the university in 2013, member certification in the Association to Advance Collegiate Schools of Business (AACSB) in 2013, certificate of thanks and recognition from the ministry of higher education and scientific research-Yemen on 22 July 2013 for efforts and success of the university to open and distance education system. Under the leadership of Prof. Aklan, the University of Science and Technology(UST-Y), Yemen, has seen development in various areas such as development and expansion in its infrastructure, opening new programs and disciplines needed for the labor market in Yemen and the region. Critical to these achievements was the preparation of the University Strategic Plan. To date 80% of the targets set in the University Strategic Plan has been successfully implemented.

== Memberships ==
- Member of the Yemeni Radiology Society.
- Member of the European Radiology Society
- Member of the Supreme Council of Yemen Universities, chaired by the prime minister.
- Vice President of the Association of Private Universities in Yemen.
- Chairman of the Preparatory Committee for the Session of the Association of Arab Universities.
- Member of the Association of Arab Universities.
- Member of the Eurasian Silk Road Universities Consortium(ESRUC).
- Member of the editorial board of the Yemeni Journal for Medical Sciences
- Member of editorial board of the Eurasian Journal of Medicine.
- Member of the editorial board of the Journal of Arab Academy.

== Publications ==
- Aklan, H.M. (2014). "Perception of Radiologists about Diagnostic Errors in Radiology in Yemen". Yemeni Journal for Medical Sciences. 8.
- Bamoshmoosh, Mohamed; Massetti, L; Aklan, H; Al-Karewany, M; Goshae, H. A; Modesti, P. A (2013). "Central obesity in Yemeni children: A population based cross-sectional study". World Journal of Cardiology. 5 (8): 295–304. doi:10.4330/wjc.v5.i8.295. PMC 3761183. PMID 24009819.
- Nassar, Omar H; Aklan, Hameed M (2014). "Erectile Dysfunction among Yemenis: Does Chewing Khat Play a Role?". The Eurasian Journal of Medicine. 46 (2): 69–73. doi:10.5152/eajm.2014.18. PMC 4261453. PMID 25610301.
- Bamoshmoosh, Mohamed; Massetti, L; Aklan, H; Al-Karewany, M; Goshae, H. A; Modesti, P. A (2013). "Central obesity in Yemeni children: A population based cross-sectional study". World Journal of Cardiology. 5 (8): 295–304. doi:10.4330/wjc.v5.i8.295. PMC 3761183. PMID 24009819.
- Modesti, Pietro Amedeo; Rapi, Stefano; Bamoshmoosh, Mohamed; Baldereschi, Marzia; Massetti, Luciano; Padeletti, Luigi; Gensini, Gian Franco; Zhao, Dong; Al-Hidabi, Dawood; Al Goshae, Husni (2012). "Impact of one or two visits strategy on hypertension burden estimation in HYDY, a population-based cross-sectional study: Implications for healthcare resource allocation decision making". BMJ Open. 2 (4) e001062. doi:10.1136/bmjopen-2012-001062. PMC 3425947. PMID 22874627.
