= Hadda, Sanaa =

Coordinates: 15°18′10″N 44°11′29″E

Hadda, also Haddah or Hadah, is a neighborhood in the southwest of Sanaa, Yemen. It contains landmarks such as the Lebanese International University (Yemen), Hadda Park, Lebanon Heart Hospital, Aljabowbi Castle, the Japanese Embassy, Hadda Mineral Water Factory, Shohada Al Sabeen School and Hadda Valley School. The area to the very west on the absolute limits of Sanaa is known as the Hadda Valley. The Old City of Hadda contains multiple castles and mosques, and is one of the sites on Yemen's tentative list of World Heritage Sites.

Its population reached 5,468 people, according to the 2004 population census in Yemen.
