= Wahiba Faraʽa =

Yemeni politician (died 2025)

Waheeba G. Fare’e Al-Fakih
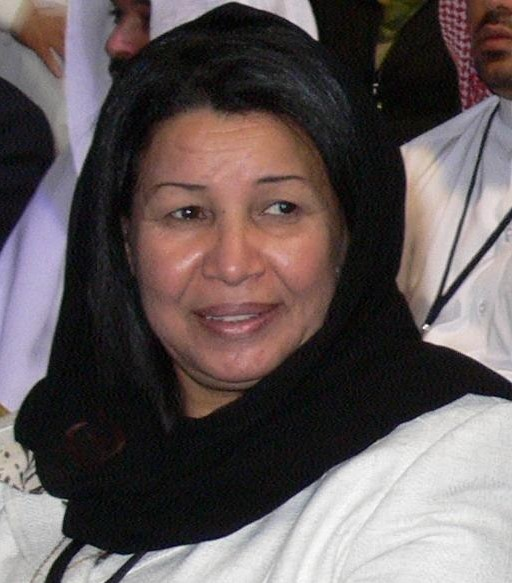

Minister of Human rights in Yemen
- In office 4 April 2001 – 16 May 2003
- President: Ali Abdullah Saleh
- Prime Minister: Abdul Qadir Bajamal
- Succeeded by: Amat Al Alim Alsoswa

Personal details
- Born: At Turbah, Taiz Governorate, Yemen Arab Republic
- Died: 24 January 2025

Waheeba Fareʽe (Arabic: وهيبة فارع; died 24 January 2025) was a Yemeni politician and a minister in the Cabinet of Yemen. She was appointed head of the newly formed Ministry of State for Human Rights in 2001, becoming the country's first female minister.

Faraʽa established Queen Arwa University, the first private university in Yemen, in 1996. She later worked as a businesswoman. Professor of Educational Planning and Development, Foundations of Education and Administration, former head of Board of Queen Arwa University, Chairperson of Dialogue and Development forum.

Faraʽa was a Staff Member of Sana’a University, Queen Arwa University and National Institute of public Administration, Advisor of many Yemeni NGO's and GOs, Consultant of many International Organizations of Education, HDR, HR, Public Administration, Higher Commission of Human Rights and The National Council of Civil Services.

Fare'e held several positions, including: since 1987 she had been working as a Lecturer of Education (Sociology, Philosophy, Planning, and Administration) at Sanaa University. Head of many Yemeni institutions Women's Educational Department 1976, YILI 1989, Faculty of Education Sana’a University 1992, Higher Education 1990, Women Studies Center at Sana’a University 1992, Founder Queen Arwa University in 1996. In 2001-2004 she was nominated as a first Yemeni woman Minister of State of Human Rights, and in 2007 was nominated as a General Director of (NIAS) National Institute of Administrative Sciences, Yemen. She participated in and organized many seminars and workshops on development, women's education, public administration, and some other political and social activities.

Fare'e died on 24 January 2025.

== Conference engagements ==
- Higher Private Education Conference, Sanaa, 2000.
- The Seventh National Conference of Administrative leadership in Yemen, NIAS, Sanaa 2008
- The Academic Supportive Conference in Comprehensive National Dialogue, Queen Arwa University, Sanaa 2013
- Dialogue and Development forum 2014

== Publications ==
- Basic Education in Yemen According to the Social Needs and New Trends, Sanaa, 1987.
- Girl's Education in Yemen, between Reluctance and Equal Educational Opportunities 1983.
- Working Children in Yemen field study, Sana’a, 1997
- Women's Socio /Economic Participation in Yemen, Sana’a, 1999
- Administration Between Theory and Practice in Yemen, Sana’a, 2009
- Women's Participation in Social Economical Development in Yemen, 2010
- Many news articles covering various subjects (1983–2014).

== See also ==
- Human rights in Yemen
