= Shohada Al Sabeen School =

School in Yemen

Coordinates: 15°18′7″N 44°11′58″E

- Hadda, Sana'a, Yemen

Shohada Al Sabeen School is a school located in the Hadda neighborhood of the southern outskirts of Sana'a, Yemen, located immediately north of Hadda Park. It is noted for its summer camp.
