= Harra of Arhab =

Volcanic field in Yemen

- Sana'a volcanic field Sana'a-'Amran volcanic field

Highest point
- Elevation: 3,100 m (10,200 ft)

Geography
- Location: Yemen

Geology
- Mountain type: Volcanic field
- Last eruption: 500 CE ± 100 years

The mainly Quaternary Harra of Arhab is the northernmost, historically active volcanic field (Arabic: حَرَّة, romanized: Ḥarrah) in Yemen. Also known as the "Sana'a-'Amran volcanic field", or simply the "Sana'a volcanic field", it has erupted in ancient times.

== Morphology ==
The field is located on a 1500 km^{2} volcanic plateau. The plateau contains a few small (older) stratovolcanoes and 60 volcanic cones. The field is arranged on a north-northwest line. Younger basaltic rocks from the Pliocene-Holocene (northern end of the field), overlie Rhyolitic rocks from the Oligocene-Miocene, which covers most of the field. The volcano is located 30 km (19 miles) north of Yemen's capital city, Sana'a.

== Eruptions ==
A historical eruption in 200 AD (a VEI 2) took place on the flank of an older cinder cone (Jabal Zebib). Another eruption from the volcano in around 500 AD took place on the south flank of Kaulet Hattab cinder cone. It produced a lava flow that travelled for 9 km (5.6 miles), and caused some damage.

== See also ==
- Global Volcanism Program
- List of volcanoes in Yemen
- Sarat Mountains
