= Mobile schools in Yemen =

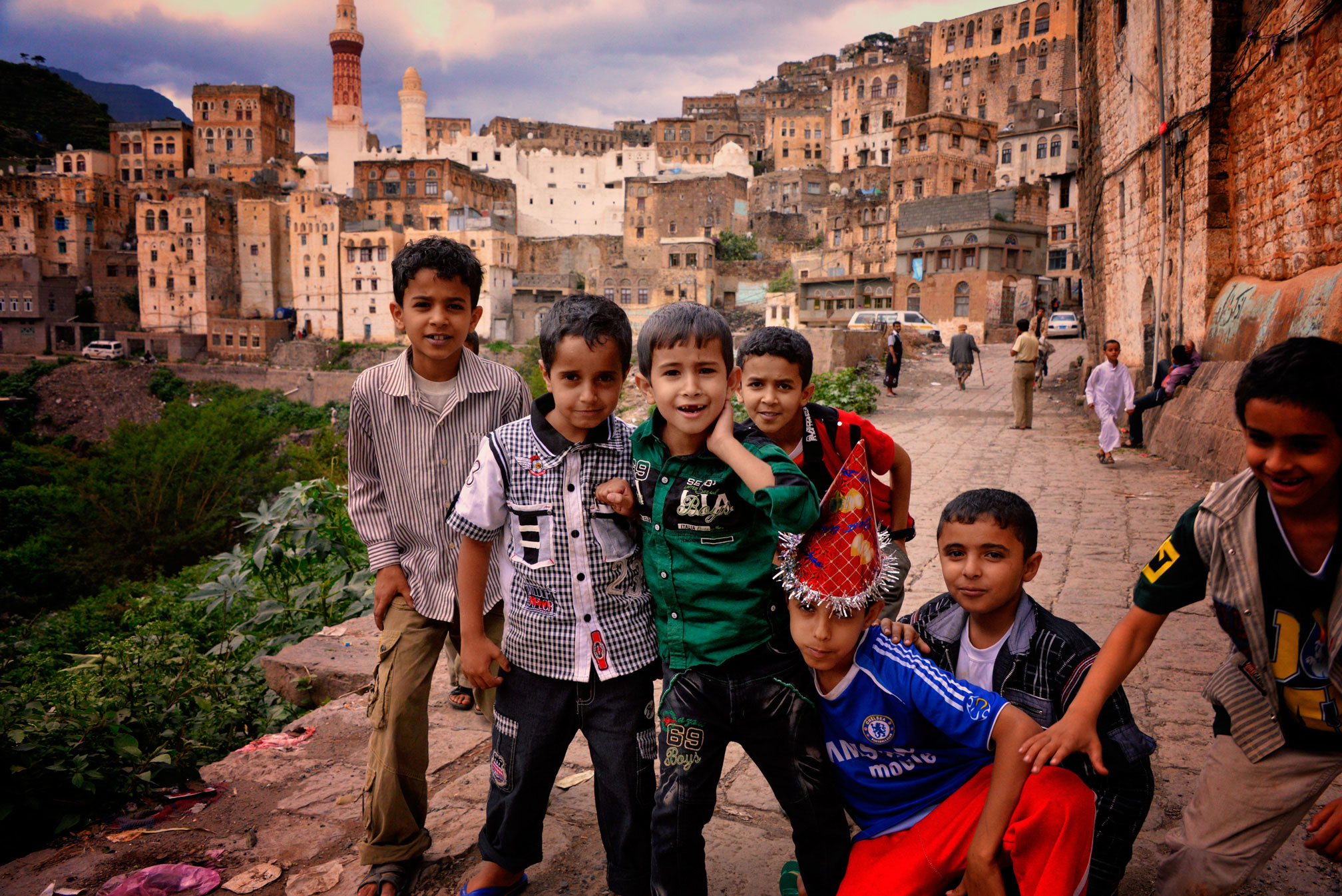
Children of Yemen, Jibla, 2014.

Mobile schools in Yemen are usually buses converted to classrooms serving to provide a teaching area for the Yemeni children living in war zones or refugee camps.

== Background ==
More than 4 million people have been displaced since 2015, due to the war in Yemen.. According to UNICEF, the war has forced 2 million Yemeni children out of school. Across the country, more than 460 schools have been attacked by the Saudi coalition, and more than 2,500 have been destroyed or are being utilized for non-educational activities, including by militant groups.

== Mobile schools ==
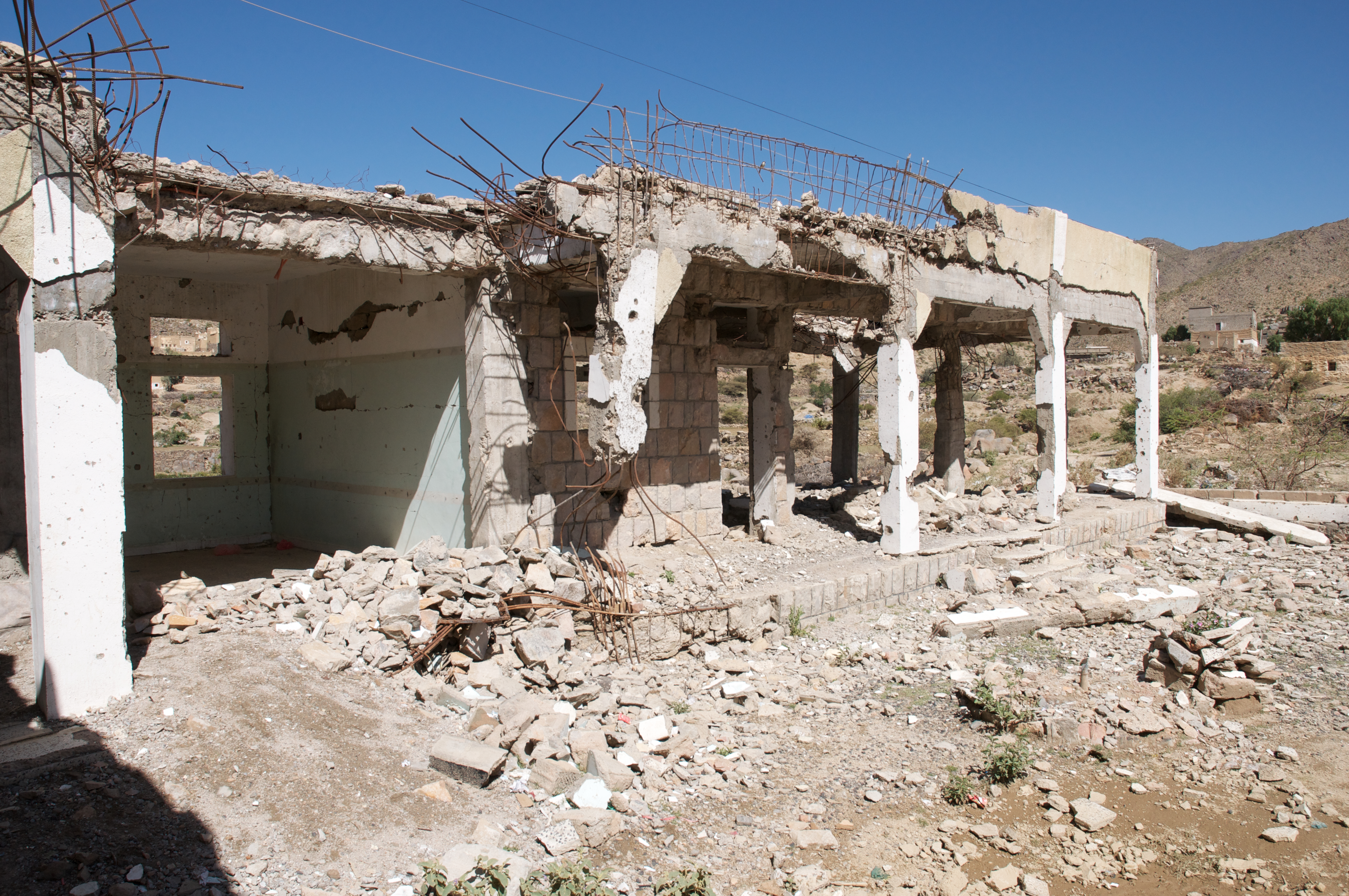
A bombed school in Sana'a, Yemen, 2013.

Nazar Al-Saqaf, 40, working in marketing started the first mobile school in October 2013. Nazar started his program in Remas, which has a reputation for having the highest rates of child labor in Sana'a, with the goal of teaching street children how to read and write.

Edris, the big yellow school bus funded by Kuwait's Rahma International Association in collaboration with local authorities, is another mobile school roaming the refugee camps with the first on being the Mafraq camp in the Al Abr district, since the camp hosts the highest number of displaced families (309 of them) and a "large number of children out of school." "It's so great to be back at school," says eight-year-old Doaa Yehia while she is running to a class. Children aged 6 to 10 went to school for three months, from 8 a.m. until noon every day except Fridays. 94 students received "intensive lessons in Arabic, Islamic studies, mathematics, and science" while sitting on colorful chairs outside in the shade of the bus awnings or inside on the chequered floor, to help them catch up on the curriculum they had missed due to the war.
