= University of Science and Technology (Yemen) =

Private university in Yemen

- جامعة العلوم والتكنولوجيا
- Type: Private
- Established: 1994; 32 years ago
- Affiliations: Association of Arab Universities
- Chairman: Dawood Abdulmalik Al-Hidabi
- Rector: Abdulghani Hameed
- Academic staff: 605
- Students: 9,496
- Location: Al-Shaab Street, Inma City, Aden, Yemen; 12°50′30″N 44°57′50″E
- Language: English
- Website: ust.edu

The University of Science and Technology (UST) (Arabic: لجامعة العلوم والتكنولجيا) is a private university in Yemen with its main campus in Aden.

UST is a member of the Association of Arab Universities, Arab Higher Education Institutions, Arab Network for Open and Distance Education, the Federation of the Universities of the Islamic World, the Federation of International Universities, and the International Council for Open and Distance Education (ICDE).

== History ==
It was originally founded as the National College of Science and Technology and licensed in December 1992. In January 1994, it became the University of Science and Technology, the first private university in Yemen. Dawood Al-Hidabi became its president in 1994. Its medical faculty began teaching in 1995. The university opened its first branch in Taiz in 1996, followed by branches in Mukalla, Hadhramaut, in 2000 and another in Ibb in 2002. It opened a teaching hospital in Sanaa in 2005. In the same year, UST was exempted from a government order to close 52 medical faculties at private universities and allowed to retain its own medical faculty.

By 2008, UST had campuses in six governorates, including Aden, with about 17,000 students enrolled, and planned to expand its the 144-bed hospital to 200 beds. The university later opened Yemen's first dental college.

In August 2020, the university relocated its headquarters to Aden, and disclaimed responsibility for activities at branches under Houthi control. On February 11, 2021, Yemen's Ministry of Higher Education and Scientific Research issued Ministerial Decision No. 6 of 2021, and approved the relocation at the request of the university's board of trustees chairman. The Yemeni government also invalidated degrees issued by the Houthi-controlled campuses.

In July 2024, the International Finance Corporation approved financing for a 250-bed teaching hospital planned by Al-Mawarid near the Aden campus.

In July 2026, Minister of Higher Education and Scientific Research Amin Noman al-Qadasi inaugurated the new fourth floor of the main campus building, housing academic facilities and laboratories. In September 2026, the Aden campus held a graduation ceremony for the university's 30th class. As of 2026, the university has 9,496 students and 605 faculty.

== Campuses ==
UST main campus is located in Aden, with subcampuses in Hadhramaut, Taiz-Al-Madina, and Ma'rib. It also operates the International Language Center,, University Book Center, the Center for Talent Development, the Medical Education Center, the GIS Center for Training and Research, the Center for Renewable Energy and Electronic Design, and the Center for Studies, Research and Engineering Consultations

UST previously operated campuses in Sanaa, Ibb, Al-Hudaydah, and Taiz-Al-Hawban, which came under the Houthi militia control in 2020. The Houthis appointed Adel Al-Mutawakkil as president and subsequently replaced university staff and faculty members with relatives and Houthi loyalists.

== Academics ==
The university comprises the Faculty of Medicine and Health Sciences, Faculty of Engineering and Computing, and Faculty of Administrative and Human Sciences, along with the Deanery of E-Learning and Distance Education and the Deanery of Postgraduate Studies and Scientific Research. It awards diplomas, bachelor's degrees, and master's degrees. As a member of the Association of Arab Universities, it jointly publishes The Arab Journal for Quality Assurance in Higher Education with the association's general secretariat. Its Centre of Talent Development publishes The International Journal for Talent Development, the Faculty of Administrative and Human Sciences publishes The Journal of Social Studies (JSS),, the Faculty of Engineering and Computing publishes The Journal of Science & Technology, and the Faculty of Medicine and Health Sciences publishes Yemeni Journal for Medical Sciences.

In the 2022 Webometrics Ranking of World Universities, the university ranked among the top two in Yemen. It ranked 59th in the inaugural 2023 Arab Ranking of Universities, compiled by a council established by the Arab League, the Arab League Educational, Cultural and Scientific Organization, and the Association of Arab Universities. It ranked 25th in 2024 and 49th in 2025. The university has been included in the QS Arab Region rankings since 2021, ranking in the 201–250 band in 2026.

== Notable alumni ==
- Tawakkol Karman earned an undergraduate degree in commerce. She was awarded the 2011 Nobel Peace Prize. She is the first Yemeni citizen and first Arab woman to win a Nobel Prize.
- Hamza Abdi Barre, Prime Minister of Somalia

== Presidents ==
- Dawood Al-Hidabi, 1994–2007
- Abdulfattah Thiyab, 2007–2009
- Hameed M. Aklan, 2009–2020
- Abdulghany Hameed, 2020–present

== See also ==
- List of universities in Yemen
