= Dhamar, Yemen =

City in Yemen

Dhamar ذَمَار
- City
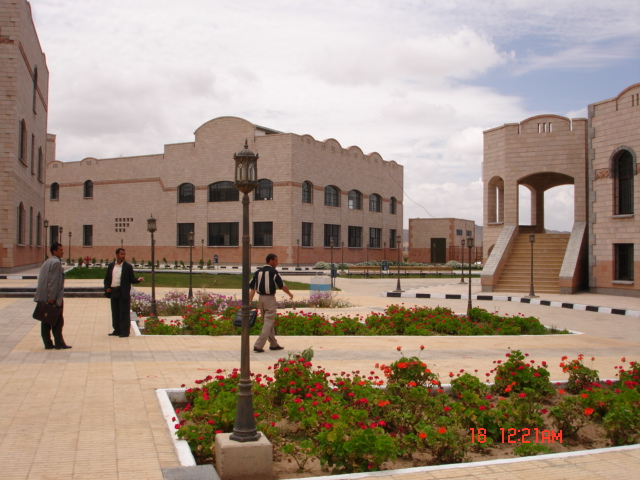
- Thamar University

- Location in Yemen
- Coordinates: 14°34′0″N 44°24′6″E
- Country: Yemen
- Governorate: Dhamar

Population (2004)
  - Total: 146,346
- Time zone: UTC+3 (Yemen Standard Time)

Dhamar (Arabic: ذَمَار, romanized: Ḏamār; Old South Arabian: 𐩹𐩣𐩧 Ḏmr) is a city in south-western Yemen. It is located at 14°33′0″N 44°24′6″E, at an elevation of around 2,400 m (7,900 ft).

== Overview ==
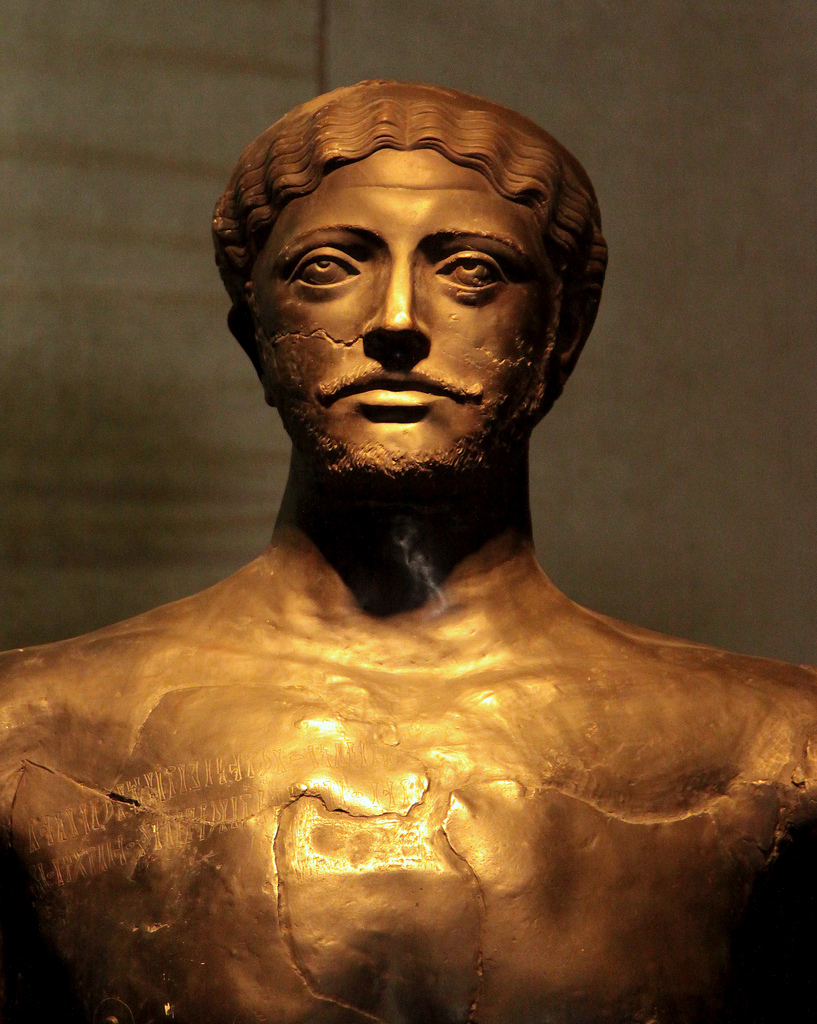
The city is named after King Dhamar Ali Yahbur

Dhamar is situated 100 km (62 miles) to the south of Sanaa, north of Ibb, and west of Al-Bayda', 2,400–2,500 m (7,900–8,200 ft) above sea level. Its name goes back to the king of Saba' and Dhu-Raydan at 135–175 AD, whose name was Dhamar Ali Yahbur, who is renowned for restoring the great dam of Ma’rib, and whose statue was found at the city of Al-Nakhla Al-Hamra'a ("The Red Palm"). This city is one of the archeological sites that are found near Dhamar. The city of Dhamar is the capital of the governorate, and is situated on the main road, which connects Sanaa with a number of other governorates. This city was one of the prominent Arabian and Islamic culture and scientific centers in Yemen. Its Great Mosque was built in the period of the caliph Abu Bakr. As Dhamar City had a great role in Yemen's political and economic life, it had an important historical role in Yemen before the lifetime of the Islamic Prophet Muhammad. The antique Yemeni engravings mentioned Dhamar city as being a very famous center of the Islamic studies and sciences, and many of the great scientists are attributed to this historical town. In past times, the people of Dhamar were known for bringing up horses; the city was an early center of horse-breeding in Arabia. The town is still known in Yemen for its numerous historical mosques and schools, which are distinguished by their characteristic architecture in harmony with the colours of its volcanic land. A volcanic field, Harras of Dhamar, extends 80 km (50 miles) to the east of the city.

The city of Dhamar, in the center of the Dhamar basin, is of ancient origin. It was built by the legendary Himyarite King Dhamar Ali Yahbir II. Dhamar is the only town in the former North Yemen that is not surrounded by a wall or natural defensive formations; it is just a settlement on the plains. Centrally situated with connections to the nearby governorates, the town has prospered as a Wednesday market and meeting place for tribes living nearby. It is home to the University of Thamar, the largest university in the country. Rosicrucians associate Dhamar with the mystical city of Damcar—a city in Arabia described in the Fama Fraternitatis, inhabited by scholars and alchemists who studied the lost secrets of Hermes Trismegistus and Solomon, visited by Christian Rosenkreuz.

== Climate ==
Dhamar has a cold semi-arid climate (Köppen climate classification: BSk).

Climate data for Dhamar
Month	Jan	Feb	Mar	Apr	May	Jun	Jul	Aug	Sep	Oct	Nov	Dec	Year
Mean daily maximum °C (°F)	21.2 (70.2)	22.6 (72.7)	25.1 (77.2)	24.9 (76.8)	26.0 (78.8)	28.1 (82.6)	25.8 (78.4)	25.3 (77.5)	25.2 (77.4)	23.6 (74.5)	21.1 (70.0)	20.8 (69.4)	24.1 (75.5)
Daily mean °C (°F)	11.8 (53.2)	12.3 (54.1)	15.7 (60.3)	16.2 (61.2)	17.9 (64.2)	18.9 (66.0)	19.6 (67.3)	19.2 (66.6)	18.0 (64.4)	16.4 (61.5)	13.9 (57.0)	12.8 (55.0)	16.1 (60.9)
Mean daily minimum °C (°F)	2.4 (36.3)	2.0 (35.6)	6.3 (43.3)	7.6 (45.7)	9.9 (49.8)	9.8 (49.6)	13.4 (56.1)	13.1 (55.6)	10.7 (51.3)	9.3 (48.7)	6.7 (44.1)	4.9 (40.8)	8.0 (46.4)
Average precipitation mm (inches)	7 (0.3)	8 (0.3)	18 (0.7)	50 (2.0)	45 (1.8)	15 (0.6)	76 (3.0)	110 (4.3)	31 (1.2)	6 (0.2)	8 (0.3)	3 (0.1)	377 (14.8)
Source: Climate-Data.org

== Notable residents ==
- Nabil Mohammed Al-Garbi - Olympic Yemeni long-distance runner
- Shoshana Damari (1923-2006), Israeli singer
