= Lebanese International University (Yemen) =

Coordinates: 15°17′16″N 44°12′12″E

- الجامعة الدولية اللبنانية
- Type: Private
- Established: 2006; 20 years ago
- President: Rida Hazimi
- Location: Sana'a, Yemen
- Website: Official website

Lebanese International University is a university located in the Hadda neighborhood of the southern outskirts of Sana'a, Yemen. It is located south of the Lebanon Heart Hospital and west by road from Aljabowbi Castle. It is a branch of the Lebanese International University, founded in Beqaa.

== See also ==
- List of universities in Yemen
