= Thamar University =

University in Yemen

Dhamar University
- جامعة ذمار
- Type: Public
- Established: 24 August 1996; 29 years ago
- Location: (Yemen) Dhamar, Yemen
- Building details
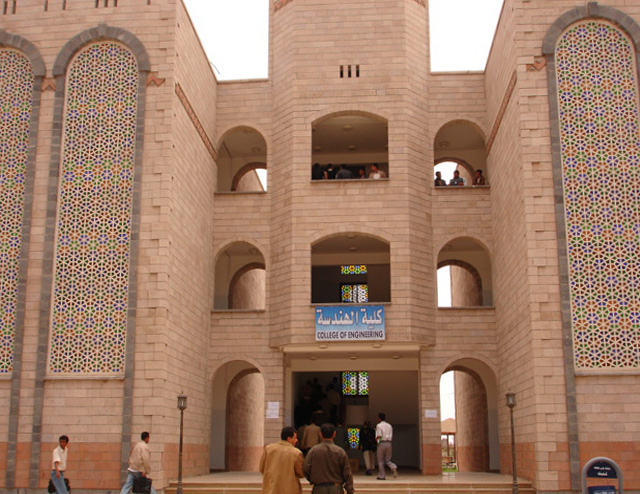

Thamar University, also called Dhamar University, is a Yemeni public university in the city of Dhamar.

The University of Thamar was inaugurated on August 24, 1996.

== History ==
The inception of the university dates back to 1990 when the Faculty of Education was established at Dhamar as a teaching center of Sana'a University. Departments such as English, Arabic, History, Geography, Islamic Studies, Physics, Chemistry, Biology and Mathematics, were opened. In 1993 another College of Education was opened at Radaa.

In 1996, Republican Decree No. 150 for 1996 was signed by the President of the Republic Ali Abdullah Saleh to establish Dhamar University. In 1996, the faculties of Arts and Language, Applied Science, Agriculture and Veterinary Science were opened, followed by the faculties of Administrative Sciences, Computer and Information Technology, and Dental Faculty in 1997. The Medical and Engineering & Dams faculties were founded in 1998. The same year, Faculty of Education in Al Bayda’a was established. The continuing education institute (two years study) was established in 2004. Faculties in both Al Bayda’a and Rada’a were separated in 2009 from Dhamar University and became an independent university of Al Bayda’a.

Thamar University is the alma mater of some 136,000 undergraduate and graduate students, drawn from almost all over governorates of Yemen. A number of students are from abroad. On the faculty of the university there more than 520 faculty members both native and expatriate from Arab as well as foreign countries.

== Admission ==
The number of students to be enrolled every year in each college is determined by the Students’ Affairs Council of Dhamar University and is approved by the High Council for Yemeni Universities. About three months before the commencement of the academic year, the Ministry of Higher Education and Scientific Research announces the date of the admission and the admission test.

University rankings

Global – Overall
- QS World: 851-900 (2026)

== Faculties ==
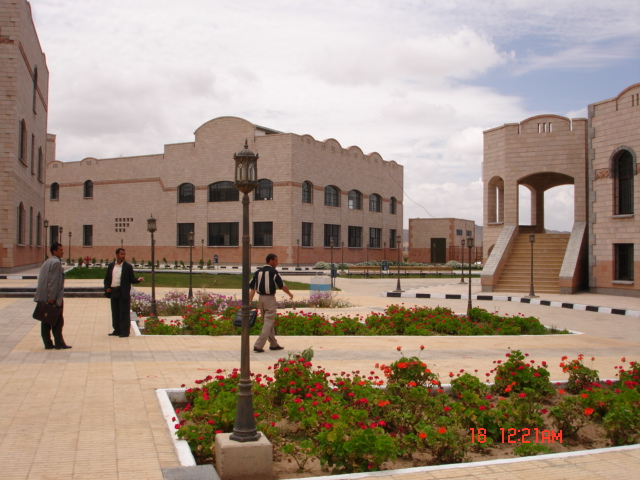
Engineering College

Thamar University has faculties of:

- Thamar University Faculty of Medicine & Health Sciences (TUFMHS) and its teaching hospital called Thamar University Al-Wahdah Teaching Hospital
- Thamar University Faculty of Dentistry and its teaching clinics
- Thamar University Faculty of Engineering
- Thamar University Faculty of Computer Sciences and Information Systems
- Thamar University Faculty of Administrative Sciences
- Thamar University Faculty of Education
- Thamar University Faculty of Applied Sciences
- Thamar University Faculty of Agriculture & Veterinary Medicine
- Thamar University Faculty of arts

It has training centers such as Continuing Learning Institute.

== See also ==
- List of universities in Yemen
