= Iman University =

Sunni religious school in Yemen

- Type: University
- Established: 1993; 33 years ago
- Location: Sanaa, Yemen

Iman University (also al-Iman University, el-Eman University, or al-Eman University; Arabic: جامعة الإيمان; Jāmiʿat al-Īmān) is a Sunni religious school founded in 1993 in Sanaa, Yemen. Al-Iman means the Faith.

As of January 2010, it reportedly had 6,000 students.

Its founder and principal director was Abdul-Majid al-Zindani, who was classified by the US Treasury as a Specially Designated Global Terrorist, and who was also under sanction by the United Nations. In 2004, he was designated a terrorist associated with al-Qaeda by both the U.S. and the United Nations. He was co-founder of Islah (a Yemeni opposition party) and was theological adviser to Osama bin Laden.

The statement made by the U.S. Treasury mentions that some students at Iman University have been arrested for political and religious murders. Some believe that the school's curriculum deals mostly, if not exclusively, with Islamist studies, and that it is an incubator of extremism. Students are suspected of having assassinated three American missionaries, and "the number two leader for the Yemeni Socialist Party", Jarallah Omar. John Walker Lindh, now serving a 20-year prison sentence in connection with his participation in Afghanistan's Taliban army, is a former student of the university.

After the Battle of Sanaa (2014), the Houthi movement in San'a' closed the Al-Iman University.

== See also ==
- List of universities in Yemen
