= Hadhramaut Mountains =

Mountain range in Yemen

- Jibāl Ḥaḍramawt (جِبَال حَضْرَمَوْت); Jibāl Al-Mahrah (جِبَال ٱلْمَهْرَة, Mahrat Mountains)
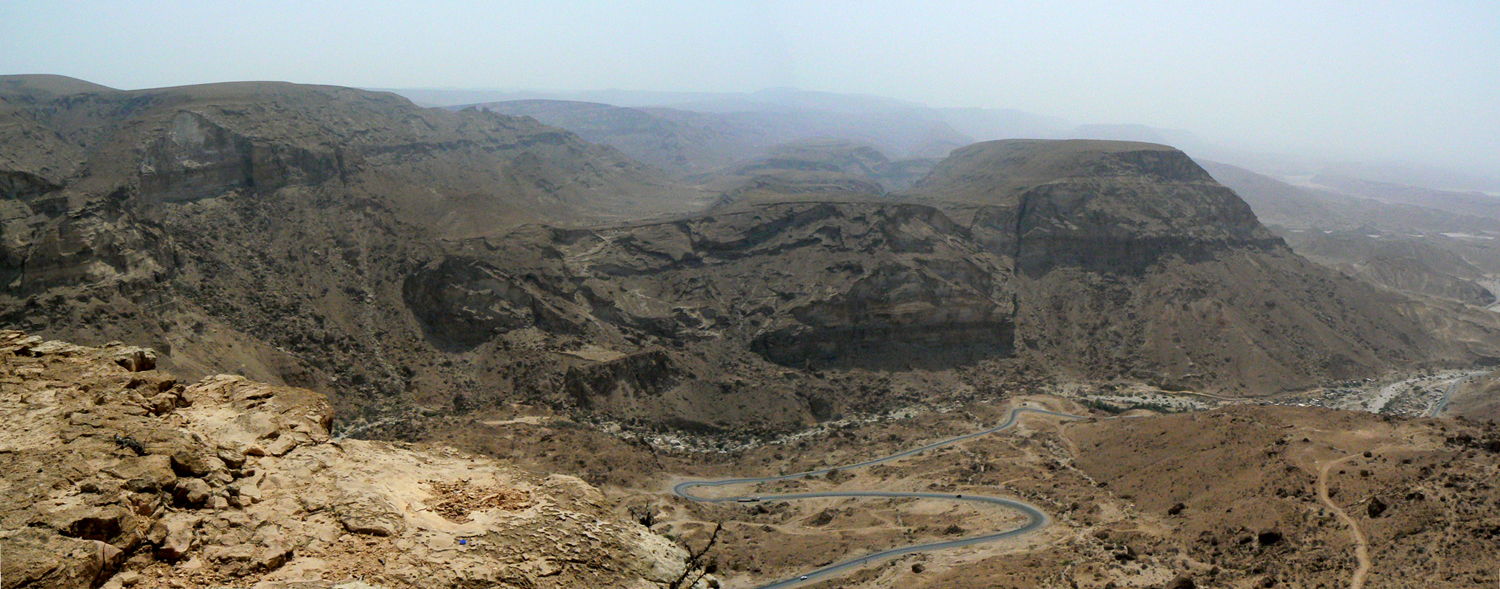
- Hadhramaut Mountains

Highest point
- Coordinates: 15.3°N 50.7°E

Geography
- Location within Yemen Location within Middle East Location within West and Central Asia
- Country: Yemen
- Region(s): Hadhramaut, Arabia

The Hadhramaut Mountains (Arabic: جِبَال حَضْرَمَوْت, romanized: Jibāl Ḥaḍramawt), also known as the "Mahrat Mountains" (Arabic: جِبَال ٱلْمَهْرَة, romanized: Jibāl Al-Mahrah), are a mountain range in Yemen. They are contiguous with the Omani Dhofar Mountains to the northeast, and James Canton considered Aden in the southwest to be in the mountains' recesses.

Historically, the area was ruled by Qu'aiti and Kathiri sultanates. The tribal society (Hadramatis) grows wheat and millet, produces also dates, coconuts, and coffee. The area was also known for its frankincense.

== Geology ==
The south side of the mountains touches the Gulf of Aden, with steep cliffs descending onto a narrow and arid coastal plain. The northern slopes are lowering onto the Rub' al Khali desert (the "Empty Quarter"). The broad mountain plateau is intersected by deep wadis cut by seasonal streams that generally flow in the northern and northeastern direction emptying into a main channel (Wadi Hadhramaut, changing the name to Wadi Masila downstream) that makes a southeast swing of 500 miles (800 kilometres) to the ocean. Despite seasonality of the streams, the water is generally available year-round sub-surface in the wadis.

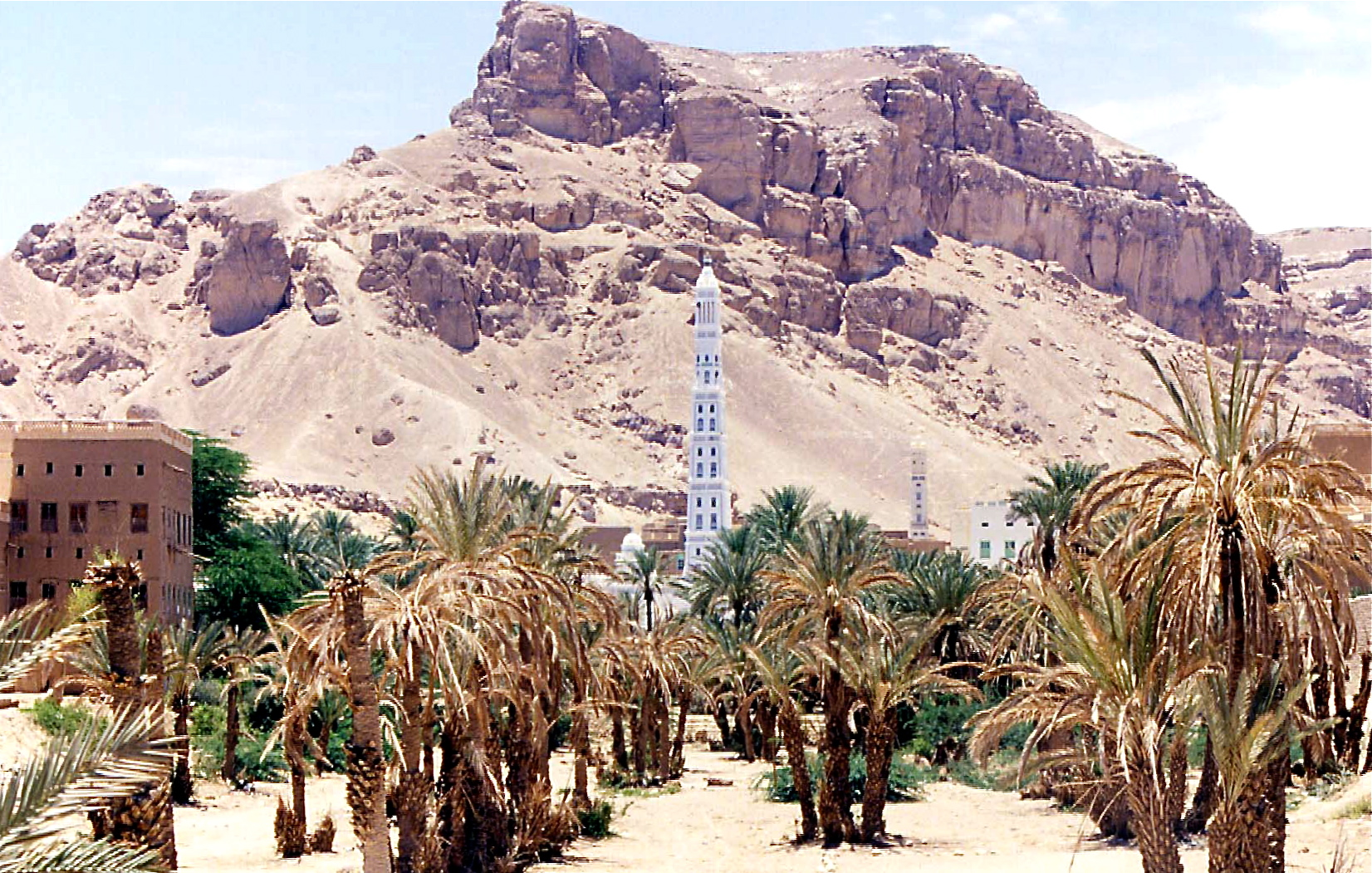
The city of Tarim

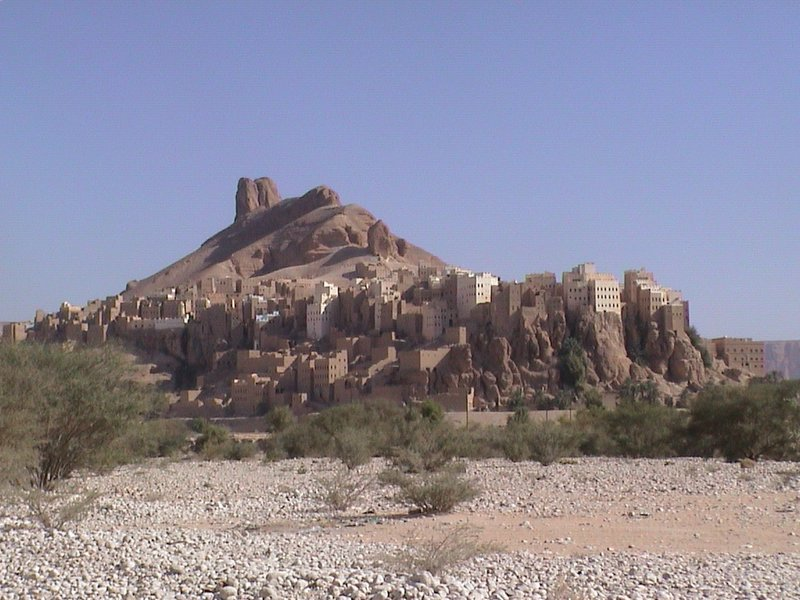
Hajjarin in Wadi Dawan

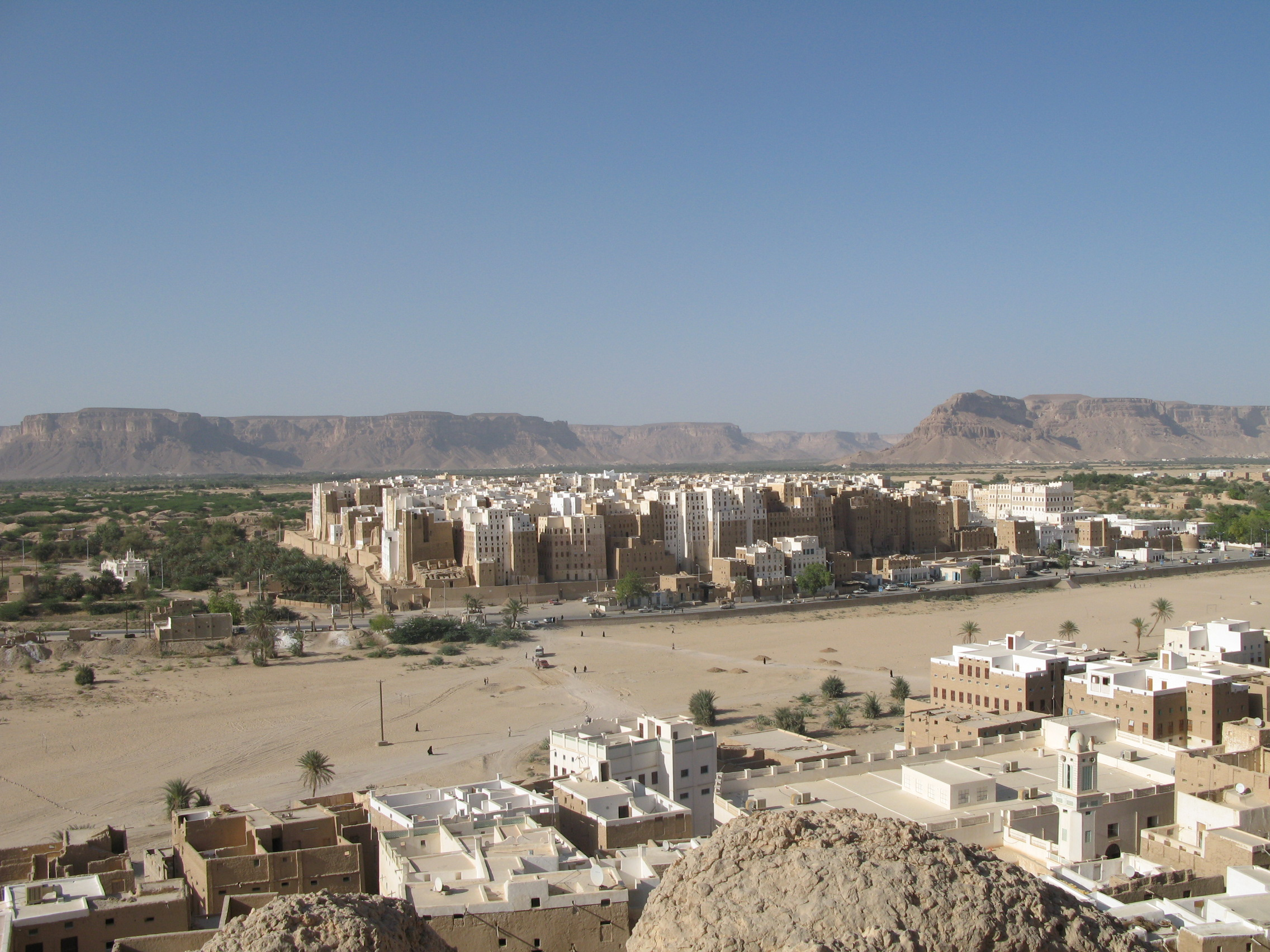
Shibam in Wadi Hadhramaut, with mountains in the background

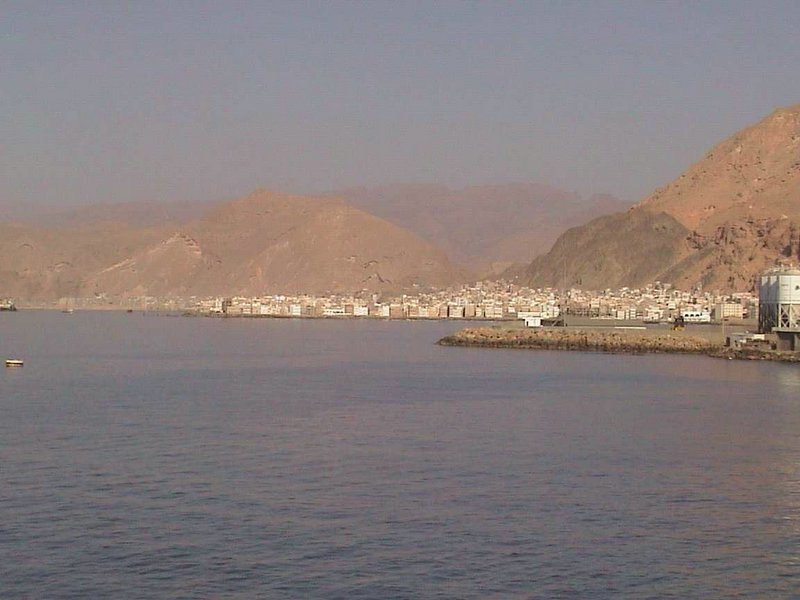
Al-Mukalla with the Hadhramaut in the background, as seen from the Gulf of Aden in the Arabian Sea

== See also ==
- Al Mahrah Governorate – partly covered by the range
- Hajhir Mountains
- Hadhramaut Governorate
- Hadhramaut Region

== Bibliography ==
- Sattout, Eva (2020). "Hadhramaut Mountains". Geological heritage in the Arab region: Value for research and Development. UNESCO Publishing. ISBN 978-92-3-100404-9.
- Prothero, G.W., ed. (1920). Arabia. London, H. M. Stationery office: Great Britain. Foreign Office. LCCN a22000920.
- Bujra, Abdallah; Brehony, Noel (2017). "Introduction". Hadhramaut and its Diaspora: Yemeni Politics, Identity and Migration. Bloomsbury Publishing. ISBN 978-1-78672-167-9.
