= Abdulmajid Sabra =

Yemeni lawyer

Abdulmajid Sabra (Arabic: عبد المجيد صبره) is a Yemeni lawyer and human rights activist. Known for his work defending people who had been subjected to enforced disappearances and arbitrary arrest and detention by Yemeni authorities, Sabra himself has been arbitrarily detained by Houthi forces since September 2025.

== Career ==
Sabra ran a law firm based in Sanaa, the capital of Yemen. On 21 September 2014, following the Battle of Sanaa, the city fell to Houthi forces, leading to the resignation of Mohammed Basindawa, the Prime Minister of Yemen. Following the implementation of a Houthi-controlled local government, Sabra began to frequently represent individuals detained for exercising their human rights, including journalists and political activists, as well as other victims of arbitrary detention by Houthi forces. Sabra often used social media, primarily Facebook, to defend human rights in Yemen, in addition to providing updates on cases he was defending.

As a result of his casework, Sabra was the victim of smear campaigns and harassment on social media. This included from prominent Houthi figures in Sanaa, such as Abdul-Malik al-Houthi, an advisor to the Houthi-run Ministry of Interior, who accused Sabra of siding with "traitors" due to his willingness to defend people deemed to be criminals by Houthis.

== 2025 arrest and imprisonment ==
On 25 September 2025, Sabra was detained by armed Houthis in civilian clothing at his office in the Shamila area of Sanaa. The charges against Sabra, as well as where he had been taken, was not known for several days after his arrest, and Houthi authorities in Sanaa initially did not confirm his detention nor allow him access to a lawyer. Sabra's family subsequently reported having seen an arrest warrant stating that he had been interrogated in relation to a post he had made on social media on 25 September in which he criticised Houthi opposition and restrictions to Yemeni citizens celebrating the 26 September Revolution, which marked the establishment of the Yemen Arab Republic in 1962. Houthis oppose celebration of the revolution and instead encourage Yemenis to celebrate 21 September to mark the fall of Sanaa to Houthi forces.

It was subsequently confirmed that Sabra was being held at the Security and Intelligence Detention Centre in Shamlan; in October 2025, it was reported that he had been placed into solitary confinement. On 11 December 2025, Sabra informed his family members that he had gone on hunger strike to protest his ongoing detention, with his family raising concerns for his physical health. It was reported that Sabra started a second hunger strike on 16 June 2026, the start of the Islamic New Year to protest 260 days of detention without charge.

== Response ==
In October 2025, a month after Sabra's arrest, 17 non-governmental organisations issued a joint statement calling on Houthi authorities to immediately and unconditionally release Sabra, as well as to end its use of enforced disappearance and arbitrary detention. Signatories included Front Line Defenders, Human Rights Watch, the International Service for Human Rights, the International Federation for Human Rights, the World Organisation Against Torture, IFEX, the Gulf Centre for Human Rights, the International Bar Association, and Human Rights First.

In early 2026, Women Journalists Without Chains concluded that Sabra's detention was a "retaliatory measure" linked to his legal advocacy for people who had been subjected to abduction, enforced disappearance, and arbitrary detention before the Houthi-controlled Specialized Criminal Court. Local media in Yemen such as Yemen Shabab reported that Houthi officials had informed Sabra he would only be released if he agreed to stop representing such cases in his work, which Tawakkol Karman described as being in contravention of Yemeni and international law; she called on the United Nations and its Special Envoy to Yemen to take "urgent and effective action" to secure Sabra's release.

In March 2026, five United Nations special rapporteurs and working groups of the United Nations Human Rights Council, including Mary Lawlor, called for "legal accountability" for the Houthis concerning Sabra's disappearance, arrest, and detention, and called on them to release Sabra ahead of Eid al-Fitr. The demands were supported by the American Center for Justice and the Women's Solidarity Network, the latter of which expressed "deep concern" over Sabra's detention and the Houthis disregard of the UN's Basic Principles on the Role of Lawyers.

On 24 September 2026, to mark one year since Sabra's arrest, Amnesty International called on Houthi authorities to release him, describing him as being arbitrarily detained due to his work as a human rights defender.
