= Al-Ahgaff University =

University in Mukaila, Yemen

Al-Ahgaff University (Arabic: جامعة الأحقاف) is a university located in Mukalla, Yemen. It was established in 1995 (30 years ago). It is accredited by Ministry of Higher Education and Scientific Research, Yemen. The university offers both undergraduate and postgraduate courses.

== See also ==
- List of universities in Yemen
