= Hadhramout University =

University in Yemen

- جامعة حضرموت
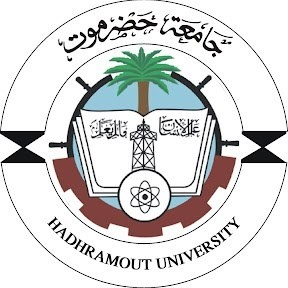
- Motto: Quran 96:5—(Arabic: عَلَّمَ ٱلْإِنسَٰنَ مَا لَمْ يَعْلَمْ, lit. 'Taught humanity what they knew not')
- Type: Public
- Established: 1993; 33 years ago
- Location: Mukalla, Yemen
- Campus: Flu'ok
- Website: hu.edu.ye

Hadhramout University (Arabic: جامعة حضرموت) was established in Hadhramaut as an official university in 1993. It includes a college of medicine.

== History ==
Founded in 1993 as the Hadhramout University of Science and Technology in Mullaka,

== See also ==
- List of universities in Yemen
