= Ibb University =

University in Yemen

- جامعة إب
- Type: Public
- Established: 1996; 30 years ago
- Location: Ibb, Yemen; 13.9629°N 44.1733°E
- Website: http://www.ibbuniv.edu.ye/

Ibb University (Arabic: جامعة إب) is a public university in Ibb, Yemen. It was established in 1996. It was founded by Nasser al-Awlaki.

== Historical background ==
Ibb University is a public university. It was established on 12 June 1996, according to Republican Decree No. (91) of 1996. It was founded as the fifth public university in Yemen and began exercising its academic and research activities as an independent university starting from the 1996/1997 academic year. It was also intended to serve all governorates of Yemen by providing academically and professionally qualified cadres across various colleges and disciplines, including the opening of new faculties since its establishment.

Faculty of Education started to serve the community, and officially opened in the 1988/1989 academic year, and the Faculty of Education in Al-Nadirah District, opened in the 1993/1994 academic year, both were affiliated with Sana’a University, in addition to the Agricultural Institute, which at that time was under the Ministry of Agriculture. These two faculties and the Agricultural Institute were incorporated into the entity of Ibb University and, together with a number of newly established faculties, formed the first building blocks upon which the university was established. Accordingly, the university was inaugurated with six faculties as follows: the Faculty of Education – Ibb, the Faculty of Education – Al-Nadirah, the Faculty of Agriculture and Veterinary Medicine, the Faculty of Economics and Administrative Sciences, the Faculty of Science, and the Faculty of Arts. Now, it has 11 faculties as follows:

- Faculty of Medicine and Health Sciences
- Faculty of Dentistry
- Faculty of Engineering and Architecture
- Faculty of Science
- Faculty of Agriculture and Food Sciences
- Faculty of Administrative Sciences
- Faculty of Education
- Faculty of Arts
- Faculty of Law
- Faculty of Applied and Educational Sciences– Al-Nadirah
- Faculty of Specifics - Al-Saddah

It has also the following centers:

- Center for Development and Quality Assurance
- Center for Computer and Information Technology
- Center for Languages and Translation
- Center for Psychological and Educational Counselling
- Center for Constant Education and Community Service
- Center for Information technology
- Center for International Relations

== Rector ==
Ibb University present Rector is Prof. Dr. Nasr Mohammed Al-Hujaili, who has been in service since 31 May, 2023.

== Admission ==
Every year a number of students from Ibb and Yemeni Governorates are enrolled in its faculties, and their number is decided by Ibb University Student Affairs Council whose decision gets approved by Yemeni University High Council. The students then register on the Electronic Gate (like other Yemeni universities). In the Faculties requiring admission test such as the Faculty of Medicine and Health Sciences, students are assessed in English language, biology, and physics. Admission tests are administered 2-3 months after registration.

== See also ==
- List of universities in Yemen
