= Emirates International University =

Private university in Sana'a, Yemen

- الجامعة الإماراتية الدولية
- Type: Private
- Established: 2014
- President: Dr. Khaled Salah
- Location: Sana'a, Yemen; 15°18′44.3″N 44°11′09.8″E
- Website: eiu.edu.ye

Emirates International University (Arabic: الجامعة الإماراتية الدولية) is a private university in Sana'a, Yemen. It was established in 2014. The university is listed by Yemen's Ministry of Higher Education and Scientific Research among private universities. In 2025, the Academic Accreditation Council of Yemen reported an external review site visit as part of program accreditation procedures at the university.

== History and location ==
The university was founded in 2014 and is located in the Haddah District (Faj Attan area) in Sana'a, according to the university's official website.

== Vision and mission ==
The university publishes statements of vision and mission on its official website, describing its objectives in higher education, research activities, and community engagement.

== Facilities ==
The university reports having teaching laboratories for medical, engineering, and computing disciplines, including anatomy and microbiology laboratories, engineering labs (such as control and mechatronics), and computer laboratories (such as programming and networking).

== Partnerships ==
The university reports cooperation and training partnerships with local institutions, including Al-Thawra General Hospital Authority in Sana'a, the Commercial Bank of Yemen, and the Higher Education Information Technology Center.

== Centers ==
The university lists centers including a Center for Development and Quality Assurance and a Training and Qualification Center.
