= University of Aden =

University in Aden, Yemen

Coordinates: 12.8115°N 45.0387°E

- جامعة عـدن
- Logo of the University of Aden
- Type: Public
- Established: 1970; 56 years ago
- President: Alkhader Nasser Laswar
- Location: Aden, Yemen
- Website: www.aden-univ.net

The University of Aden is the first Yemeni university, founded alongside Sana'a University in 1970. The university is a non-profit public higher education institution located in the metropolis of Aden (population range of 1,000,000-5,000,000 inhabitants). Officially recognized by the Ministry of Higher Education and Scientific Research of Yemen, the University of Aden is a coeducational Yemeni higher education institution. The University of Aden offers courses and programs leading to officially recognized higher education degrees such as bachelor's degrees, master's degrees, and doctorate degrees in several areas of study. The University of Aden also provides academic and non-academic facilities and services to students including a library, sports facilities, and administrative services.

== History ==
The foundation of the College of Education in 1970 and Nasser's College for Agricultural Sciences in 1972 was the launching point of the University of Aden. The two colleges were under the jurisdiction and authority of the Minister of Education. In 1974 the College of Economics was founded. Every college constitutes an administrative unit. When the necessity arose for the foundation of more colleges, a ministerial decree was issued to form a ministerial committee for the University Town presided over by the prime minister.

On 10 September 1975, statute No. 22 for 1975 was issued pertaining to the foundation of the University of Aden as a scientific establishment. The statute determines the goals of the University of Aden as follows:

- Preparing and qualifying scientific cadres in specializations.
- Performance of scientific researches that serve social and economic development.
- Presentation of technical consultations for various state foundations.

In the year of its foundation, the university had already embraced the following colleges:

- College of Education
- Nasser's College for Agricultural Sciences
- College of Economics
- College of Medicine

From 1975 to 1999 a number of colleges and affiliate colleges were founded:

- College of Law in 1978.
- College of Engineering in 1978.
- College of Education, Zingibar in 1979(Abyan Governorate).
- College of Education, Saber in 1980 (Lahj Governorate).
- College of Education, Mukalla, 1974 (nucleus for Hadhramout University).
- College of Education, Shabwa, 1994.
- College of Education, Yafa', 1998.
- College of Education, Radfan, 1998.
- College of Education, Dhala', 1998.
- College of Education, Lodar, 1998
- College of Oil and Mineralogy, Shabwa, 1996.

== Other events ==
On 29 December 2015, Islamist gunmen forced the faculties of administrative sciences, law, and engineering to close, citing unacceptable levels of gender integration.

== See also ==
- List of Islamic educational institutions
- List of universities in Yemen
