= Hodeidah University =

University in Yemen

- جامعة الحديدة
- Type: Public
- Established: 1996; 30 years ago
- President: Hasan Al-Matari
- Students: 25,000
- Location: Al Hudaydah , Yemen; 14.7701°N 42.9542°E
- Campus: Hodeida Bajil Raymah Bait Al-Faqih Al Khawkhah

Hodeidah University (also spelled Hodeida University) (Arabic: جامعة الحديدة) was established in Hodeida, Yemen as an official university in 1996. Before its foundation, Education College was already established in 1988 as a branch of Sana'a University.

The university consists of 18 colleges:

- Education College in Hodeida
- Education College in Zabid
- Commerce and Economy College
- Sharia and Law College
- Faculty of Arts
- College of Marine Science and Environment
- Faculty of Physical Education and Sports
- Faculty of Medicine and Health Sciences
- Faculty of Fine Arts
- Faculty of Science and Computer Engineering
- Faculty of Dentist
- Faculty of Engineering: Petroleum Engineering, Chemical Engineering and Food engineering
- Faculty of Clinical pharmacy
- Faculty of Education and Applied Sciences - Bajil
- Faculty of Education and Applied Sciences - Raymah
- Faculty of Science and Administration - Bait Al-Faqih
- Faculty of Agriculture
- Faculty of Specific Education - Al Khawkhah

== See also ==
- List of universities in Yemen
