= Ahmar =

Ahmar (Arabic: أحمر (ʾaḥmar) meaning "red") or Al Ahmar (الاحمر) may refer to:

== Given name ==
- Ahmar Ashfaq (born 1996), Pakistani cricketer
- Ahmar Mahboob, Australian Pakistani linguist and professor

== Al-Ahmar ==
- Abdullah al-Ahmar (born 1936), Syrian politician
- Dorotheus IV Ibn Al-Ahmar (died 1611), Melkite Patriarch of Antioch
- Ismail ibn al-Ahmar (1387–1406), Moroccan historian

=== Yemeni family ===
- Abdullah ibn Husayn al-Ahmar (1933–2007), Yemeni politician
- Ali Mohsen al-Ahmar (born 1945), Yemeni military officer
- Sadiq al-Ahmar (born 1956), Yemeni politician
- Sam Yahya Al-Ahmar, Yemeni politician
- Hamid al-Ahmar (born 1967), Yemeni businessman and politician
- Hashid Abdullah al-Ahmar, Yemeni politician

== Places ==
- Ahmar Mountains, mountains in Ethiopia
- Ahmar, Myanmar, town in Ayeyarwady Region, Myanmar and its corresponding Ahmar Subtownship

Containing the word Ahmar

- Al-Ras al-Ahmar, Palestinian Arab village in the Safad Subdistrict
- Bab al-Ahmar, one of the nine historical gates of the Ancient City of Aleppo, Syria
- Dahr El Ahmar, Lebanese village
- Deir el Ahmar, Lebanese town
- Khirbet ar-Ras al-Ahmar, Palestinian village in the Tubas Governorate of the West Bank
- Rasm Al-Ahmar, Syrian village
- Wadi al Ahmar, area within Sirte District
