= Timeline of the Yemeni revolution (January – 2 June 2011) =

Historical event timeline

Yemeni revolution
- Part of the Arab Spring
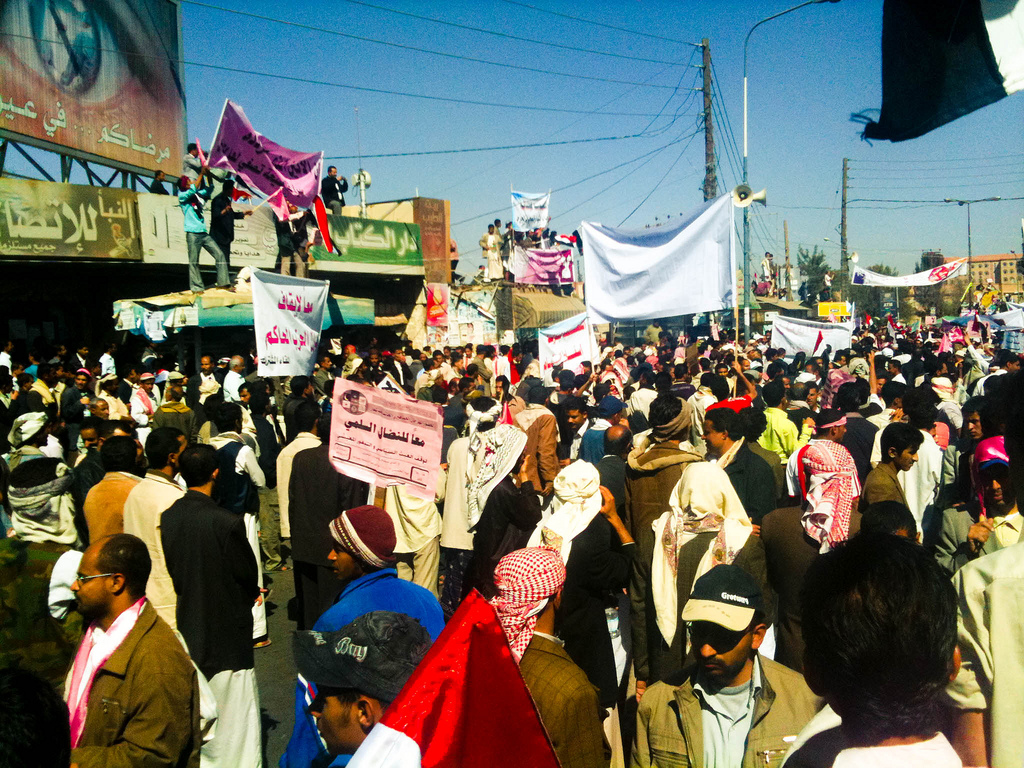
- Revolution in Sanaa on 3 February 2011
- Date: 27 January 2011 – 27 February 2012
- Location: Yemen
- Caused by: Unemployment; Poor economic conditions; Corruption; Government's proposals to modify the Constitution of Yemen; Inspiration from concurrent regional protests
- Methods: Demonstrations; Civil resistance; Self-immolations; Strike actions; Mutiny; Non-violent revolutions; Army defections; Armed confrontations between Hashid militiamen and loyalist soldiers.
- Result: Overthrow of Saleh government: Resignation of Prime Minister Mujawar; Resignation of MPs from the ruling party; Occupation of several Yemeni territory by al-Qaeda and Houthi rebels; Restructure of the military forces by sacking several of its leaders; Approval of President's immunity from prosecution by Yemeni legislators; Presidential election held to replace Saleh as the new president of Yemen; Abd Rabbuh Mansur Al-Hadi elected and inaugurated

Parties
(Yemen) Yemeni opposition: Joint Meeting Parties; South Yemen Movement; Houthis; Students; Hashid; Alliance of Yemeni Tribes; Defected soldiers; Civil Bloc; National Dialogue Committee	(Yemen) Yemeni government: General People's Congress; Yemen Army; Yemeni Police Force; Republican Guards; Yemeni Air Force; Pro-Government Tribes

Casualties
- Deaths: 2,000 (by 18 March 2012)
- Injuries: 22,000
- Arrested: 1,000

The following is a timeline of the 2011 Yemeni revolution from January to 2 June 2011. The Yemeni revolution was a series of major protests, political tensions, and armed clashes taking place in Yemen, which began in January 2011, influenced by concurrent protests in the region. Hundreds of protesters, members of armed groups, army soldiers and security personnel were killed, and many more injured, in the largest protests to take place in the South Arabian country for decades.

This section of the timeline includes the inception of the protest movement in January 2011 and its growth into a full-fledged uprising over the next several months, with the opposition occupying parts of the capital of Sanaa and Taiz in protest against the government of President Ali Abdullah Saleh and in solidarity with Egyptian protesters. By the end of May and the beginning of June, attempts by the regional Gulf Co-operation Council to mediate an end to the crisis had broken down, and tribal fighters clashed openly with government security forces in the streets of Sanaa, bringing the country to the brink of a civil war.

== Timeline ==
=== January ===
==== Mid-January ====
Thousands of Yemenis protested in Sanaa's streets since mid-January 2011 to demand a change in government, though the protests in the south of the country were more aggressive. The protests "appeared to be the first large-scale challenge" to Saleh's rule; protesters compared him to the ousted Tunisian President Zine El Abidine Ben Ali, citing government corruption and the poor economy of Yemen. Protests occurred in multiple towns in both the north and south of Yemen initially against Yemeni governmental proposals to modify Yemen's constitution, rejecting the proposals as insufficient, and over unemployment and economic conditions. Protests on 20 January included thousands of protestors in Taiz. Protests in Aden took place on 18, 19 and 20 January. In Aden, car tires were burned, roads were blocked and at least seven people – both soldiers and protestors, were injured. Protests in Sanaa appeared to be weakening as of 20 January 2011. Two of the protests occurred at Sanaa University, with a slogan "Leave before you are forced to leave", which Reuters interpreted as a criticism of "autocratic Arab leaders, including Saleh."

==== 27 January ====
At least 16,000 demonstrators took to the streets in Sanaa on 27 January, including at least 10,000 at Sanaa University.

After the government announced intentions for political reforms, protesters rejected the proposals as not extensive enough to ensure Saleh or his son do not continue to rule indefinitely. Protesters appeared to be pushing for reform rather than a revolution unlike in Tunisia. A Yemeni journalist stated: "These were not spontaneous or popular protests like in Egypt, but rather mass-rallies organised by the opposition who are using events in Tunisia to test Saleh's regime. This is only the start of a fierce political battle in the run-up to Yemen's parliamentary elections in April."

==== 29 January ====
On 29 January, protesters in Sanaa demanded the ouster of Saleh. They chanted "Ali, leave leave" and "Tunisia left, Egypt after it and Yemen in the coming future" before plainclothes police officers attacked the demonstration, though no casualties were reported. Tawakel Karman, a leading parliamentary member of the Al-Islah, said a security force personnel tried to attack her with a dagger and a shoe but protesters stopped him. She also said that "We will continue until the fall of Ali Abdullah Saleh's regime. We have the Southern Movement in the south, the (Shia) Huthi rebels in the north, and parliamentary opposition [calling for political change]."

At the end of the month, activist Belquis Al Lahabi noted that, initially, women led multiple protests and a number of the issues raised were on maternal mortality, child marriage, and the uneven burden of illiteracy and poverty on women – though by the end of the first month, women were beaten in the town square in Sanaa that they once led.

=== February ===
==== 3 February – "Day of Rage" ====
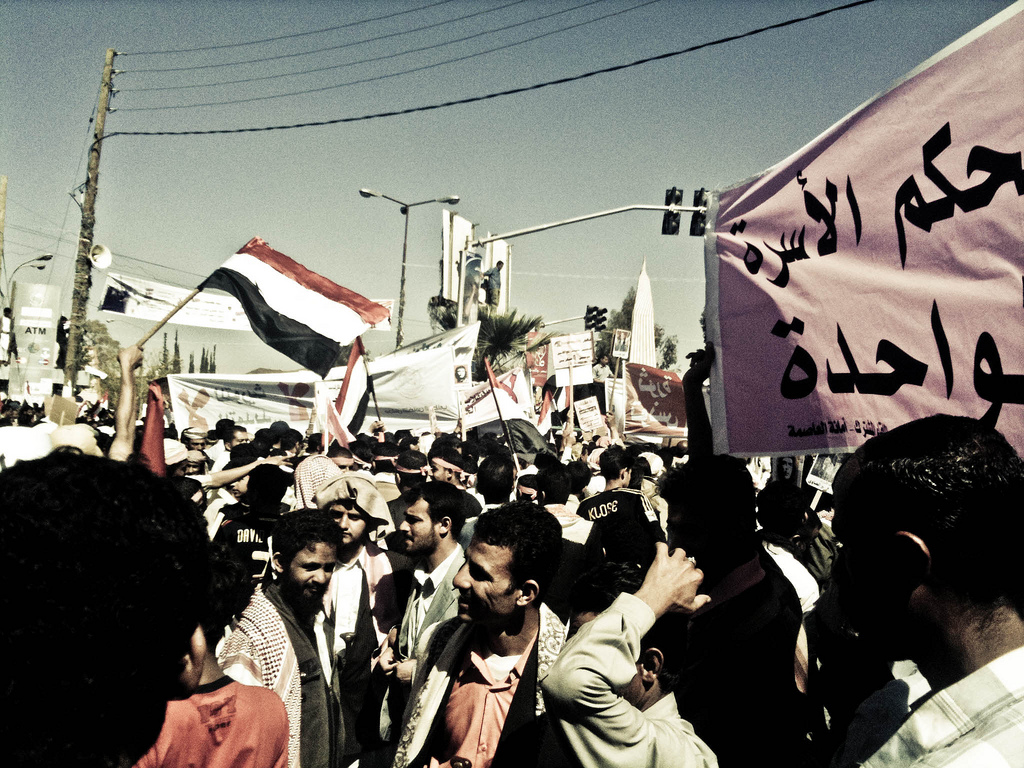
Protesters in Sanaa on 3 February

Karman called for 3 February to be a "Day of Rage." According to the Xinhua News Agency, organisers were calling for a million protesters to participate in the demonstration in Sanaa. The day before, the Interior Ministry stated that it was increasing security prior to the planned protests in order to prevent weapons from being introduced and "suspects" from entering major cities.

About 20,000 people demonstrated in Sanaa. Prior to the anti-government demonstration, armed members of the General People's Congress set up tents and portraits of President Saleh in Al-Tahrir Square, the original anti-government protest venue, forcing a change of venue for the anti-government protestors. A protest in Aden was broken up by security services who reportedly fired tear gas and even live ammunition. Mohammed al-Sabri of the Common Forum called Saleh's attempt to halt protests "unacceptable;" though he also said that his group would "discuss the president's announcement." Al Jazeera said Yemen had increased security the next day.

==== 11 February ====
Human Rights Watch said that demonstrators celebrating the ouster of Hosni Mubarak in Egypt turned violent when hundreds of men armed with knives, sticks, and assault rifles attacked the protesters.

==== 12 February ====
By noon, at least 4,000 protesters gathered to demonstrate in Sanaa, with numbers expected to rise.

Approximately 5,000 police with clubs and government supporters beat the anti-government protesters who were celebrating the resignation of Egyptian President Hosni Mubarak and were also demanding the removal of Saleh. Protesters also tried to reach the Egyptian embassy in Sanaa, but police forces kept them back. The General People's Congress sent busloads of their members, equipped with food, water and tents, to Sanaa Square to prevent protesters from gathering there. Clashes then broke out between the groups after pro-Saleh protesters, armed with knives and sticks, forced about 300 anti-government protesters to end their protests. The Associated Press reported government troops as beating the anti-government protesters who were chanting "After Mubarak, it's Ali's turn" and "A Yemeni revolution after the Egyptian revolution."

The Al-Iman University, which was supposed to have been associated with the Muslim Brotherhood faced calls from MPs for its closure.

==== 13 February ====
About 2,000 protesters marched in Sanaa in the third day in a row of protests. The protesters chanted "the Yemeni people want the fall of the regime" and "a Yemeni revolution after the Egyptian revolution." About 1,000 protesters then broke off to march to the presidential palace where police then blocked access to the palace and clashed with them.

Saleh and an unnamed opposition group were preparing to start talks to avoid an "Egypt-style" revolt. Saleh also postponed a trip to the United States "due to the current circumstances in the region."

==== 14 February ====
Several thousand protesters, mostly university students, demanding Saleh resign and for political reform started at Sanaa University. Pro-government demonstrators then came to the university and attacked the other demonstrators, before the latter started to march ahead. Though police initially managed to keep a counter-demonstration apart from the anti-government protesters, violence was reported. Police also then pushed back the anti-government protesters using clubs. Reports suggested multiple injuries and twenty-three arrests. Protests that turned violent were also reported in Aden and other cities.

==== 15 February ====
In Sanaa, about 3,000 people protested against the President and were attacked by about 2000 government supporters and plain-clothes police with tasers.

==== 16 February ====
About 500 people protested in Aden, calling to "overthrow the regime" and for President Saleh "to leave". Two were shot dead by police. In Sanaa, hundreds of students protesting against the President were attacked by supporters of the President armed with batons, stones and daggers. Judges continued a sit-in that started on 15 February calling for greater independence for the judiciary, for the members of the Supreme Judicial Council to be dismissed, and for higher salaries.

Various witnesses said the anti-government protesters had gathered at Sanaa University in the capital and clashed with loyalists armed with batons and daggers. At least four people were wounded in a similar confrontation on the 16th, as student demonstrators were trying to march from the university toward the city centre and threw rocks at their government attackers, as they continued marching from the university. One person was also killed during a clash between demonstrators and police in Aden.

==== 17 February ====
About 2,000 protesters, both anti-government and pro-government wearing Yemeni flags as headbands and capes, faced off against each other on Sanaa's Al Rabat Street around noon. Stones and pieces of concrete were thrown and the anti-government and pro-government groups sometimes ran towards each other. Police arrived after over an hour of clashes and fired warning shots into the air until all protesters left the area.

A group of influential clerics in Yemen have called for the formation of a national unity government that would see the opposition represented in key ministries, followed by elections in six months. They say the move would place Yemen in the same situation as Egypt and Tunisia, without suffering bloodshed.

On 17 February, in a seventh day of clashes, some supporters of the Yemeni government clashed with anti-government demonstrators calling for Saleh's ouster.

==== 18 February – "Friday of Anger" ====
In the largest demonstrations yet, tens of thousands of Yemenis took part in anti-government demonstrations in Sanaa, Taiz and Aden for a "Friday of Fury", as it was termed by protest organisers, with pro-government supporters also rallying in several cities. In the capital, Sanaa, the crowd marched towards the presidential palace, chanting anti-government slogans, despite riot police attempting to stop them from doing so. Three people have been killed in the demonstrations with one of the deaths happening after a hand grenade was thrown at anti-government protesters in Taiz. There were also reports of gunfire during a rally in Aden, where riots flared overnight, with protesters setting fire to a local government building and security forces killing one demonstrator.

==== 19 February ====
Several anti-government protesters have been injured in clashes with supporters of Yemen's president, as both sides fired pistols and assault rifles, the first reported use of firearms by demonstrators. Five Saleh opponents were wounded by gunfire, three of them seriously, and three were wounded when demonstrators threw stones at each other outside the university. Around 1,000 anti-government demonstrators chanted "Leave! Leave!" and "The people want the fall of the regime!", and between 200 and 300 Saleh supporters called for dialogue.

In southern Yemen, where resentment of rule from Sanaa has run high, dozens of men used their cars in the town of Karish to block the main road between Taiz and Aden, shouting for "the fall of the regime". In Aden as many as 400 protesters staged a peaceful sit-in, holding banners saying: "No to oppression. No to corruption". The local council of Sheikh Othman, a directorate in Aden, said in a statement it resigned in protest at the use of live bullets by security forces against protesters which led to deaths and injuries in the city on Friday. In Sanaa, the editor of the defence ministry newspaper was wounded when he was beaten and stabbed by anti-government protesters.

==== 20 February ====
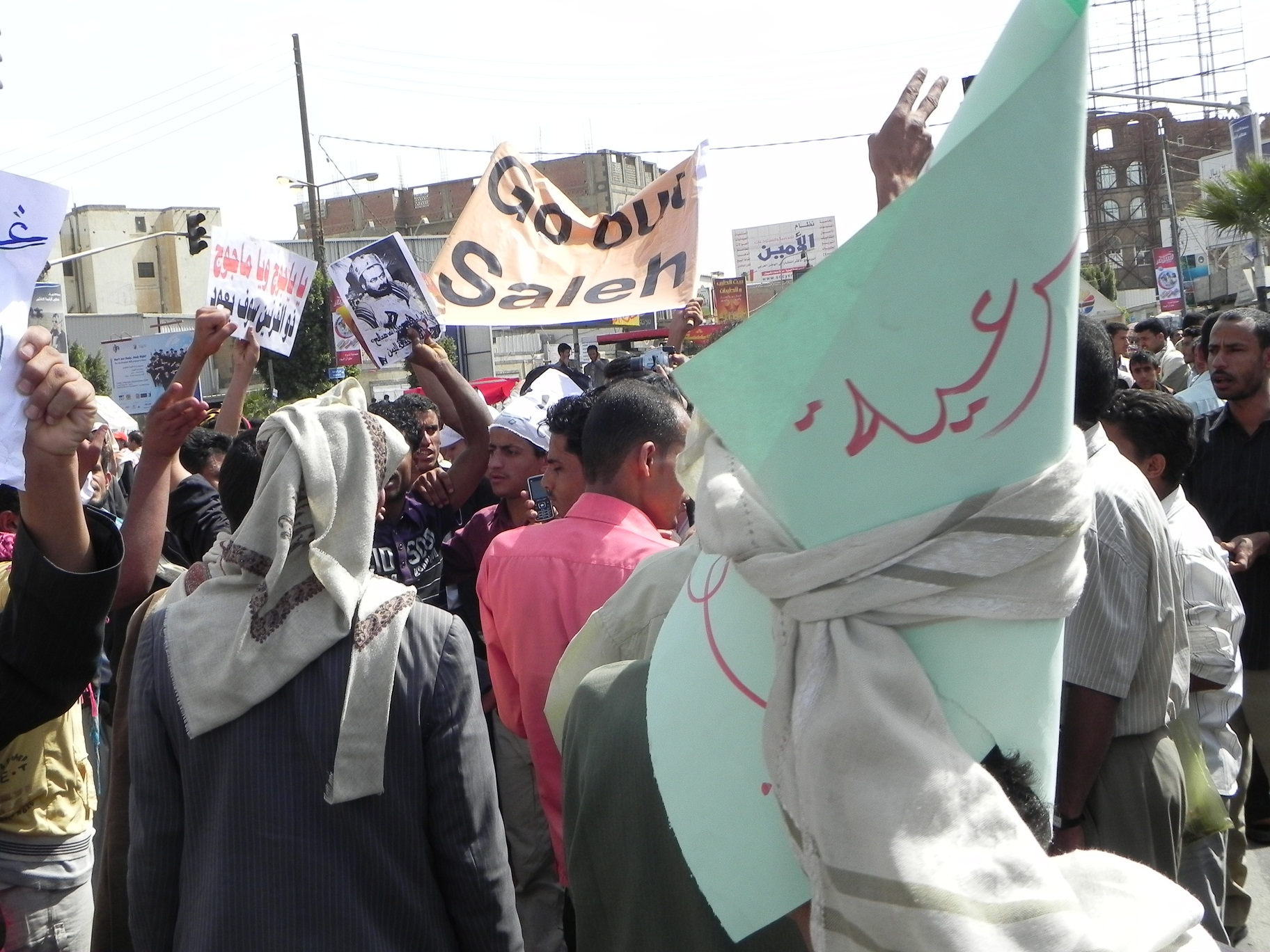
Some tribes joined student sit-ins at Sanaa University on 21 February.

Protests continued as students started a sit-in at Sanaa University. Tents were set up in front of Sanaa University's gate, while thousands of people also staged sit-ins in the cities of Ibb and Taiz. Some tribal representatives came from Arhab, Nahm, Anis (in Dhamar), Shabwah and Abyan to support the peaceful protests, engaging in traditional Yemeni dances with the students. Students from Al-Razi institute declared a sit-in as well.

==== 21 February ====
On 21 February, a teenager was killed and four people were wounded in a clash with soldiers in Yemen's southern port of Aden.

In a press conference, Saleh said that only defeat at the ballot box will make him quit, while the EU delegation to Yemen also issued a statement strongly condemning the use of violence against peaceful protesters and urging Saleh to respond to "the legitimate aspirations of the Yemeni people". Yemeni clerics declared that the use of force against protesters is prohibited, which they described as a "crime," and calling for a ban on arbitrary arrest and torture. Amid the ongoing turmoil, authorities have detained, Hasan Baoum, a leader of the separatist Southern Movement.

==== 22 February ====
Anti-government protesters in Yemen continued to demonstrate. A car belonging to Saleh's supporters in Sanaa was burnt. Thousands or protesters also rallied at Sanaa university, while hundreds continued to camp out in a nearby square. Protesters also set up checkpoints around the Sanaa square and searched those trying to enter. Pro-government protesters, armed with daggers and batons, clashed with students resulting in five injuries, before police intervened. The protests result in one death.

In Aden, 12 people were killed over the course of the previous week. Schools were also closed, most government employees were not working and a number of shops were closed as hundreds gathered to protest. Protesters in Ash Shihr chanted "Down, down with Saleh." In Taiz, thousands of protesters marched in the Safir square. Hundreds have been camping in the square for at least a week, having renamed it "Freedom Square." A spokesman for the opposition rebuffed Saleh's offer of dialogue and a group of Islamic leaders called for a national unity government that would lead the country to elections.

==== 23 February ====
Eight MPs of the ruling party resigned from the party in protest against the violence used by the government against the protesters.

Saleh ordered security forces to protect protesters.

==== 24 February ====
Protests were reported across the city, including in the southern secessionist stronghold where one anti-government protester was reported killed as a result of a landmine blast at an anti-government protest in Lawder.

Reports suggested Saleh had "instructed all security services to thwart all clashes and prevent direct confrontation between pro- and anti-government protesters".

==== 25 February – "Day of Rage" ====
As many as 180,000 people marched across the country in yet another "day of rage." In Sanaa about 30,000 anti-government protesters, ten times as many as had become "normal," convened in front of Sanaa University.

Police opened fire on the protesters killing between four and eleven people and wounding forty-three.

==== 26 February ====
Major tribes in Yemen joined the anti-government protests, including the Hashid and Baqil tribes.

==== 27 February ====
Hundreds of thousands of Yemeni pro-democracy protesters took to the streets Sanaa demanding for Saleh steps down.

Saleh also called for his army generals to "defend the country." Various opposition parties said they are joining the young protesters to seek Saleh's removal.

==== 28 February ====
Anti-government protesters increased in number. By the end of the day, Saleh said he would make a proposal for a national unity government even if the opposition parties reject his proposal he said that he would invite independent personalities that would then lay the groundwork for constitutional reforms. Having initially said that the protesters' demands could not be met through "anarchy and killing" he later invited opposition parties to form the new government. Mohammed Saleh al-Qubati, an opposition leader, rejected the effort saying Saleh should step down instead of offering outdated "tranquilisers."

=== March ===
==== 1 March ====
Tens of thousands of the anti-government protesters as well as members of opposition parties took to the streets of Sanaa again. At Sanaa University they chanted "Leave" to Saleh after having rejected his demand of a new government.

The head of the Council of Islamic Clerics and Yemen's Muslim Brotherhood Abdul-Majid al-Zindani joined the protesters. Previously he had been an ally of Saleh and called for end to protests.

A senior member of the South Yemen Movement, Yassin Ahmad Saleh Qadish, stated that they wanted a referendum on secession (similar to the 2011 Southern Sudanese independence referendum) if protests succeeded in getting Saleh to step down, stating that "sharing power and resources" did not take place as promised for Yemeni unification.

==== 2 March ====
Protests continued, largely centering on Sanaa University. Protesters have called for massive demonstrations on 4 March.

==== 3 March ====
Houthi rebels in the north said that the Yemeni Air Force bombed a protest in Harf Sufyan, where thousands had gathered, killing four and injuring thirteen.

The opposition groups agreed on a transition plan which they would offer Saleh, which would foresee him leaving office by the end of 2011.

==== 4 March ====
Saleh rejected the opposition's offer, as Yemeni cities saw the biggest anti-Saleh demonstrations yet, with one protest stretching over 2 kilometres in length. Yemeni soldiers fired rockets and artillery at anti-government protesters in the country's north, in Semla, a village in the 'Amran Governorate, killing at least two people and wounding around seven others, according to a statement issued by the Houthi rebels. According to Al Jazeera, local security forces dismissed the Houthi's account of events, saying armed tribesmen tried to enter one of the city's security checkpoints by force, after which "clashes ensued, three tribesmen and four policemen were injured"

Tribal sheikh Ali Ahmad al-Umrani, an ally of Saleh, resigned on this day.

==== 5 March ====
Tens of thousands continued with protests in several cities across Yemen, including Sanaa, Aden, Taiz and Hadramawt. Al Jazeera reported that the government had suspended classes at the universities in Sanaa and Aden.

Hashid Abdullah al-Ahmar, Deputy Minister for Youth and Sports, resigned in protest against the violence used against demonstrators. Several members of Yemen's ruling party, including members of parliament and some ministers have resigned, bringing the number of resigned ruling party MPs to thirteen. They include Ali Al-Imrani, an MP from al-Baida province, and Fathi Tawfiq Abdulrahim, head of the finance committee of parliament, Sam Yahya Al-Ahmar, the deputy culture minister, whose brother Hussein left the party a week earlier, Hashid Abdullah al-Ahmar, the deputy minister for youth and sports as well as Nabil Al-Khameri, a businessman.

==== 8 March ====
On 8 March, army troops joined protesters. About one million people also staged a protest in southern Yemen, as forces loyal to Saleh's government have killed a boy and injured several others. There were also protests in several prisons that led to at least one death.

Army troops also stormed Sanaa University's campus resulting in ninety-eight injuries. The doctors who treated protesters claimed that what had initially been assumed to be tear gas, used by the military to disperse the protesters, might actually have been nerve gas.

==== 9 March ====
On 9 March, a supporter of the president was killed during clashes with anti-government protesters, in the southern province of Hadramawt while another person was injured.

==== 11 March – "Friday of No Return" ====
A "Friday of No Return" protest was called after Friday prayers. Tens of thousands of people gathered in Sanaa calling for the ouster of President Saleh. Hundreds of thousands more protested in other cities throughout the country.

During the night, Yemeni police surrounded protesters encamped in a square in Sanaa. Shortly before dawn the next day, they fired on protesters using tear gas and live ammunition. Three people were killed in Sanaa, while another was killed in Mukalla.

==== 12 March ====
For the second time in two days security forces fired live ammunition and lobbed tear gas grenades during protests in Change Square (University Square) outside Sanaa University on 13 March. Witnesses said at least ten people were injured.

==== 14 March ====
On 14 March, in the Ma'rib Governorate, a group of protesters stabbed Governor Naji al-Zaidi and four bodyguards with daggers. Al-Zaidi was then flown by helicopter to a military hospital in Sanaa. Three soldiers were reported killed during protests in Al Jawf Governorate. The city of Al Jawf was then taken over by the protesters.

==== 16 March ====
On 16 March, at least 120 people were wounded in clashes in Hudaydah as police and government loyalists attacked anti-government protesters with tear gas, rocks and bullets.

==== 17 March ====
On 17 March, five people were killed and eighty wounded in Taiz. There were also reports of one person dead and two hundred more injured in Hudaydah. Four injuries were also reported in protests in Sanaa. Security forces were again reported to have used live ammunition and tear gas against protesters.

==== 18 March ====
External videos
- Raw Video: Yemeni Forces Open Fire on Protesters on YouTube

At least 45 anti-government protesters died and over 200 were injured as unidentified gunmen opened fire on them in Sanaa. Jamal al-Sharaabi, a thirty-five-year-old Yemeni photojournalist, was killed in the attack, marking the first journalist death of the protests.

Sniper fire was also reported. It has been reported that the attackers were pro-government gunmen, though Saleh said that his security forces did not open fire and were even unarmed at the time. There are also reports that some of the protesters who were injured in the attack were taken away in national security vehicles to a local prison for treatment instead of to a regular hospital, sparking fears that the injured will be further harassed. Tens of thousands of people also took to the streets in other cities across the country.

Saleh declared a state of emergency across the country, while state media blamed the violence on "clashes among citizens." The Common Forum, a coalition of the opposition parties led by Ali Mohammed al-Sabry, condemned the shootings.

The Washington Post reported that US President Barack Obama and US Secretary of State Hillary Clinton and French President Nicolas Sarkozy had condemned the attack.

==== 19 March ====
On 19 March, The Battle of Sa'dah began

==== 20 March ====
On 20 March, Sheikh Sadiq al-Ahmar, the leader of the Hashed, which includes Saleh's tribe, issued a statement asking the president to respond to the people's demands and leave peacefully. It was co-signed by several religious leaders.

Amid a spate of defections and resignations from the army and the diplomatic corps, rival tanks and armoured vehicles from both sides of supporters within the military were deployed in Sanaa.

==== 22 March ====
Saleh stated on 22 March that he would be willing to step down by the end of the year as part of a "constitutional transfer of power," but the opposition rejected the offer out of hand.

Two soldiers were reportedly killed in fighting between defected and loyalist army units in Hadida.

On 22 March, President Saleh issued a statement saying that he considered the protests to be a "coup" and that a civil war would eventually ensue if protests continued.

==== 23 March ====
On 23 March, the parliament enacted a thirty-day emergency law which suspended the constitution, allowed media censorship, banned street protests and gave security forces far-reaching powers to arrest and detain suspects.

==== 24 March ====
State-owned media reported that there was a massive gun battle between the army and Al Qaeda forces in the province of Abyan and Marib, with soldiers killing fifteen terrorists and arresting others. The government said that the terrorists killed three soldiers and wounded three others. Meanwhile, the army fought the Presidential guards in the town of Mukalla on Thursday with army units backing opposition groups, and around 10,000 protesters gathered in Sanaa, chanting slogans such as "Go, go, you coward; you are an American agent."

Saleh accepted the opposition's transition plan later on that day.

==== 25 March – "Friday of Departure" ====
The opposition has called on Friday to be a day of mass protests dubbed the "Friday of Departure" (or "Day of Departure"). Hundreds of thousands across Yemen showed up to protest against President Saleh, including in Sanaa. President Ali Abdullah Saleh announced at a public appearance in Sanaa, where "tens of thousands" government supporters gathered, that he would not step down but would seek dialogue with anti-government protesters and make concessions.

==== 26 March ====
Saleh and top general Ali Mohsen al-Ahmar (who had sided with the rebels) continued talks about stepping down from their respective positions simultaneously, transferring power to a civilian-led transitional government. Tribal and military leaders and the U.S. Ambassador were also present. The talks broke down over the choice of those civilians. Reuters reported five suspected al-Qaeda militants were killed in Yemen when they attacked a security checkpoint in Lawdar in the South, and three others there the day before.

==== 27 March ====
General Al-Ahmar said that Saleh is trying to use the Al-Qaeda threat to stay in power. President Saleh warned of "civil war" that "will result to tribes fighting each other and a split of Yemen into four separate parts" in a threat similar to the one Saif al-Islam Gaddafi made to the Libyan people in February.

==== 28 March ====
Some sources indicated on 28 March that a deal was still being worked out with Saleh, despite his assurances to the contrary at public appearances, and that the matter of discussion were the conditions regarding the activities of his sons and other relatives, especially whether they would be immune from prosecution; under the plan, Saleh would hand over power to the vice president (though not the current one, who has indicated he does not wish to have a role in the transitional government; a new one would be appointed before Saleh's resignation), and the new government would amend the constitution before organizing presidential and parliamentary elections.

Following an ammunitions factory explosion in Khanfar, in southwestern Yemen, officials stated that the government had lost control of six out of eighteen of the country's provinces. Saba News Agency, an official Yemeni state media, also made reference to a "caretaker government".

==== 30 March ====
Hundreds of thousands of people took to the streets to protest against Saleh, and accused him of being responsible for the weapon factory explosion. Protesters threatened to storm the presidential palace this Friday if Saleh does not leave. Protesters call for a million man march in Sanaa on Friday, now dubbed "Day of Liberation".

A coalition of opposition groups issued a statement saying they would not leave the square near Sanaa University until Saleh and his allies are removed from power. It called for a temporary presidential council of five experienced individuals of integrity who would run the country for six months, through an appointed technocrat that would form a caretaker government. It also called for the trial of corrupt officials, return of "stolen public and private property", release of political detainees, dissolving the state apparatus and the closing the information ministry – steps similar to those taken in Tunisia and Egypt. They also called for dialogue over the complaints of northern Shias and southerners who wish to secede.

==== 31 March ====
Hundreds of thousands of anti-government demonstrators again turned out in 'Change Square' in Sanaa. Meanwhile, tribe members opposed to the president attacked electricity installations in the Ma'rib Governorate, setting off power outages in parts of the capital, as well as in Aden and Hudaydah.

=== April ===
==== 1 April – "Friday of Enough"/"Friday of Brotherhood" ====
Anti-Saleh protesters named the day a "Friday of enough", while loyalists branded it a "Friday of brotherhood". Thousands of pro-democracy protesters converged on Change Square in Sanaa, with some of them setting up tents and hanging posters of young men recently killed in demonstrations. The opposition movement told Al Jazeera that they had hundreds of thousands of people, in over fifteen provinces in Yemen, including tens of thousands in Sanaa, the largest turnout seen there so far. Meanwhile, state television showed thousands of people near the presidential palace, displaying support for the country's leader. Saleh addressed the crowd, pledging to "sacrifice" himself for the people.

==== 2 April ====
In Sanaa, Saleh thanked thousands of supporters gathered near the presidential palace for backing the constitution. In the Aden Governorate, thousands of protesters clashed with anti-riot police backed by tanks. Protesters called for a general strike and residents responded by skipping work, resulting in a shut down of public transport while many closed shops. In Hudaydah, seven protesters were wounded by riot police, as they used batons and tear gas to disperse them.

The opposition also proposed a transition plan that mandated the country's president to hand power to his vice-president Abd al-Rab Mansur al-Hadi. Part of his interim duties would have been to reorganise the country's security apparatus and the Republican Guard, currently controlled by Saleh's family.

==== 3 April ====
Police used tear gas to disperse pro-democracy protesters in Taiz's main square, resulting in over 600 injuries.

==== 4 April ====
Thousands marched through Taiz toward Freedom Square, where demonstrators have been camped out, but were blocked when passing in front of governor's headquarters by security forces stationed there. Clashes broke out, with some protesters throwing stones, and troops on nearby rooftops opening fire with live ammunition, killing 12 demonstrators and wounding 30. Protests were also held in Mukalla, as well as in Hudaydah, where a protesters' march was blocked and they were fired upon with tear gas and live ammunition by security forces, as they tried to march on a local presidential palace.

==== 5 April ====
The US called for Saleh to step down after Yemeni security forces killed at least seventeen people south of Sanaa, though it did not stop military aid for counterterrorism activities.

==== 6 April ====
On 6 April, thousands of people again took to the streets. In Khormaksar, Aden governorate, hundreds of students set up road blocks, demanding the release of people detained earlier in the day and calling for officials to be triad for massacres against protestors in Sanaa and Taiz. Security forces opened fire and shot tear gas in an attempt to disperse them.

==== 8 April ====
Hundreds of thousands protested against Saleh across Yemen, with tens of thousands in Sanaa's Change Square alone, but thousands also staged a pro-Saleh rally. The president made an address rejecting the GCC's offer for a plan to let Saleh step down.

==== 9 April ====
Security forces shot and wounded thirty people in Sanaa, while eighty others suffered injuries from beatings with batons.

==== 10 April ====
According to doctors, one person was killed and up to 500 people were injured after security forces used live fire on dozens of demonstrators in overnight clashes in Sanaa and Taiz. A mass march to the United Nations building in Yemen's capital was cancelled due to fears of reprisals.

==== 13 April ====
Five people were killed in Sanaa as forces loyal to a defected army general and pro-government fighters clashed, while two more people were killed in Aden in clashes between security forces and anti-regime demonstrators. Later on the same day, approximately 10,000 soldiers from the republican guard defected and joined Ali Mohsen's command.

==== 15 April ====
Hundreds of thousands held anti-regime protests after Friday prayers in Sanaa, while others protested in Aden, Taiz and the Hadramawt Governorate. Meanwhile, thousands of supporters gathered near the presidential office, where Ali Abdullah Saleh called on the opposition, whom he also called liars and "bandits", to join talks to ensure stability, warned of a possible civil war and break-up of the country.

==== 16 April ====
Thousands of women protested in Sanaa, Taiz and other cities against remarks made a day earlier by Ali Abdullah Saleh that it is un-Islamic for women to join men in demonstrations. In Aden, armed men tried to storm a police station and then battled with security forces for half an hour before being driven back by rooftop sniper fire.

==== 17 April ====
Hundreds of thousands of people protested in the streets in Sanaa and as well as in Taiz, Ibb and Hudaydah. Pro-government forces opened fire at an anti-government march in the capital, wounding at least four people, as some tried to march outside the usual protest zone.

==== 18 April ====
Defectors of the ruling party founded the Justice and Development Bloc on 18 April.

==== 22 April ====
Protesters held another large Friday rally, and this time managed to occupy change square. Nearby, Saleh staged a rally in support for him where he encouraged the GCC's plan, while protesters do not believe the GCC's plan is appropriate.

==== 23 April ====
Saleh announced he had accepted the GCC's plan. The proposal included his stepping down and shifting control to his deputy after 30 days. The agreement included immunity for him and his family and further required the opposition to stop public protests and join a coalition with Saleh's ruling party. The opposition, led by Yassin Saeed Noman, accepted the spirit of the agreement but rejected the conditions, citing a preference to allow Saleh's party to finish its term and acknowledging a lack of power to stop protests. The agreement came under heavy pressure internationally. Reactions to Saleh's acceptance have been reserved, without the agreement formalized or accepted by both sides and with the possibility of the stand-off continuing.

==== 25 April ====
The opposition decided to agree to the GCC-brokered deal, confirming they would consider joining a national unity government. Opposition leaders reportedly received assurances from the US that Saleh would hold up his end of the bargain and leave power at the end of the thirty-day period after the deal goes into effect.

==== 26 April ====
Protests continued despite the announcement of a deal between Saleh and the opposition. Security forces loyal to the president fired live ammunition in a bid to break up demonstrations in several locales, wounding several, media reported.

==== 27 April ====
Mohammed Basindwa, a leading opposition figure, announced the deal for Saleh to leave power would likely be formalized in a signing ceremony on 2 May or sooner. In Sanaa, security forces shot at a crowd of about 100,000 protesters. The live rounds killed 12 protesters and injured about 190. About 15 protesters were detained or abducted, the opposition reported.

==== 29 April – "Friday of Loyalty to the Martyrs" ====
Protests against Saleh occurred nationwide, with tens of thousands in Sanaa taking to the streets. Saleh threatened to pull out of the GCC plan because of Qatar's planned presence at the agreement signing event. The opposition also threatened to pull out of the plan due to ongoing protester deaths.

==== 30 April ====
Officials close to Saleh said that he has "reservations" and will not sign the GCC-brokered deal. Some protesters were not too fond of the deal either, as it prevented Saleh from being prosecuted for crimes. The future of the deal is unclear, as the opposition has insisted they will not trust Saleh to honor its terms if he does not sign it himself, but leading members of his ruling party are willing to sign the deal as a sort of proxy.

Protesters in Mansoura fired at security forces loyal to Saleh as they attempted to dismantle roadblocks set up to protest the government, a government official claimed. Three soldiers and one civilian were injured.

The Yemen Post reported that four were killed when security forces raided and burned a protest camp in Aden.

=== May ===
==== 1 May ====
Media reported that the GCC deal appears to be dead, or at least on hold, as the opposition refused to fly to Riyadh for the signing after being informed that Saleh has refused to sign it himself.

==== 2 May ====
Protesters nationwide called for President Saleh to be put on trial. The GCC said it will send an envoy to try to salvage the deal. In Aden, a protester was shot dead by security forces amidst a demonstration calling for a swift trial of police officers accused of killing a suspect in their custody.

==== 4 May ====
An explosion in the southern Yemen area of Zinjibar killed 5 soldiers, while the surviving soldiers killed four civilians in apparent panic.

In Sanaa, protesters launched large demonstrations against the GCC mediation. There was also a women-only rally held to protest the kidnapping of pro-democracy woman activist Badreh Ghallan by security forces.

==== 5 May ====
The Yemeni Defense Ministry said Saleh, ruling party officials, and opposition leaders tentatively agreed to sign the GCC deal at a ceremony in Sanaa and not Riyadh on an undisclosed date, Xinhua reported.

==== 6 May – "Friday of Gratitude to the South" ====
Media reported that hundreds of thousands protested again in the western part of Sanaa and released balloons in pan-Arab colors with slogans calling for Saleh to step down painted on them. A staged counter-demonstration in front of the presidential palace by Saleh also occurred where Saleh promised to resist calls for him to step down. Taiz experienced massive protests as well. The opposition bloc also announced that they have pulled out of the deal because of Saleh's personal refusal to sign it.

==== 7 May ====
A protester was killed in al-Maafir after police used tear gas and live ammunition against a student-led demonstration in the town. Eleven others were injured. Ibb and Hadramawt were also the scene of thousands-strong protests led by youths, who called for Saleh to step down immediately and face trial. The opposition also reaffirmed its refusal to sign the GCC deal if any changes are made to accommodate Saleh or if the president declines to sign it himself.

==== 9 May ====
3 civilians were killed in Taiz when security forces fired on a teachers rally for better pay and against Saleh.

==== 11 May ====
Thirteen protesters were killed by plainclothes officers in Sanaa, and over fifty shot. In Taiz, protesting drastically escalated, with protesters burning down the local police station and seizing three government buildings including the oil ministry; two protesters were killed. Protesters have called for escalations in demonstration by expanding camps, general strikes, and seizing the presidential palace on Tuesday if Saleh does not step down by then.

==== 12 May ====
Protesters prepared for their next big Friday, and intend to march on government buildings, though expecting strong security resistance. Several hundred tribesmen came to Sanaa in an attempt to protect protesters from security forces.

==== 13 May ====
Sit ins increased, with a tent camp spreading two miles long. The oil minister of Yemen said oil output was down to half. Tens of thousands rallied in Change square demanding Saleh's ouster, but Saleh gave a speech to one of his staged rallies saying that he will not step down.

Three protesters died in Ibb, a city in Yemen, after being shot by security officers. The rally in Sanaa against Saleh was four miles long, making it one of the largest so far.

==== 15 May ====
Protests across Yemen continued. The opposition refused any GCC initiative which extend Saleh's time as president, and said the GCC plan is dead. Several soldiers were killed in Southern Yemen by gunmen. Protesters in Aden shut down three government buildings and increased sit-ins. In Mansoura, students protested and several youth activists were injured. On the island of Socotra, hundreds of women demonstrated to call for Saleh's resignation.

==== 17 May ====
As demonstrations across Yemen continued, the opposition said it sticks to the original GCC plan and nothing else, after the GCC suggested altering the deal in Saleh's favor to get him to step down. The opposition warned that if the GCC did not get Saleh to step down soon, the people will try to remove him by force as they wish to prosecute him for crimes.

==== 20 May ====
As nationwide protests continued, President Saleh called for early elections to "end the crisis". Saleh's spokesman said that Saleh would sign the GCC deal on Sunday, a promise which he twice broke. The opposition believes this is just a move to buy time, and promised to keep up the pressure on Saleh.

==== 21 May ====
Opposition groups signed the GCC deal after saying they received assurances Saleh would "definitely" sign on the following day.

==== 22 May ====
Saleh indicated that he would not accept previously agreed terms for the signing of the GCC deal. Several thousand gunmen hired by Saleh's government besieged the United Arab Emirates' embassy in Sanaa, where diplomats from the United States, United Kingdom, European Union, and GCC were staying during international efforts to monitor what diplomats and opposition groups had hoped would be the start of a peaceful transition.

==== 23 May – 2 June – Battles of Sanaa and Zinjibar ====
A day after Saleh refused to sign the transition agreement, Sheikh Sadiq al-Ahmar, the head of the Hashid tribal federation, one of the most powerful tribes in the country, declared support for the opposition and his armed supporters came into conflict with loyalist security forces in the capital Sanaa. Heavy street fighting ensued, which included artillery and mortar shelling, in which, by 26 May, around 120 people were killed, including loyalist and defected soldiers, tribal militiamen and civilians. The militiamen had surrounded and blocked off several government buildings in the capital, taken control of the SABA state news agency and the national airline building and were constantly attacking the Interior Ministry building, which was used by the loyalists as a frontline base. People on the ground were reporting that it looked like the situation was deteriorating into a civil war.

Leaked documents show that the Saleh and the defense ministry have intentionally prepared to start a civil war in Yemen, and are trying to build up brigades to fight against citizens.

===== Battle of Zinjibar =====
As the situation in Sanaa was developing, about 300 Islamic militants attacked and captured the coastal city of Zinjibar (population 20,000). During the takeover of the town, the militants killed five policemen, including a high-ranking officer, and one civilian. Two more soldiers were killed in clashes with militants in Loder.

On 28 May, the Hashid and the government reportedly entered into a ceasefire, the terms of which allegedly stipulated that tribesmen loyal to al-Ahmar would withdraw from occupied government buildings. However, Al Jazeera reported that explosions were heard in Sanaa even after the ceasefire was agreed, and Sanaa remained divided between opposition and government control. According to reports, 120 people were confirmed dead as a result of the week's fierce fighting.

Meanwhile, militants in Zinjibar consolidated their control by capturing six army tanks and several armored vehicles. The military clashed with the alleged Islamist fighters outside the city and shelled the outskirts of the town. By late on 29 May, the militants still had full control of the city. 21 soldiers five militants and eight civilians were reported to have been killed in the fighting by 31 May. Some opposition figures and activists charged that President Saleh allowed the capture of Zinjibar by the supposed Islamists to support his claims that the country would not be able to survive without him.

By 31 May, the ceasefire had broken down and street fighting continued in Sanaa. Tribesmen had taken control of both the headquarters of the ruling General People's Congress and the main offices of the water utility. As of 1 June, the death toll from the street fighting in Sanaa had reached 200.

=== June ===
==== 1 June ====
Fourteen soldiers died in overnight fighting with Hashid tribesmen, the Defence Ministry claimed. The Kuwaiti government said it had evacuated its diplomats from Sanaa due to ongoing clashes in the Yemeni capital. Late during the day, several large blasts rattled the city, though immediate reports on damage and casualties were not available. About 1,000 dissident soldiers loyal to General Ali Mohsen al-Ahmar mobilised in concert with Hashid fighters for the first time in the evening, according to The Wall Street Journal.

==== 2 June ====
The Christian Science Monitor, a United States-based daily, reported that President Ali Abdullah Saleh deployed U.S.-trained counterterrorism forces to combat the coalition of Hashid fighters and army defectors battling security troops in Sanaa.

== See also ==
- Outline of the Yemeni crisis, revolution, and civil war (2011-present)
- Timeline of the Yemeni crisis (2011–present)
- Karama Has No Walls—a short documentary film on the events of Friday 18 March 2011
- Timeline of the Yemeni revolution
