= Al-Masdar Online =

Yemeni online daily newspaper

- Type: Print newspaper (2007–2015); Online newspaper (2009–present)
- Founded: 13 November 2007
- Ceased publication: 26 March 2015 (print)
- Political alignment: Independent
- Language: Arabic
- Country: Yemen
- Website: almasdaronline.com

Al-Masdar Online (Note: Arabic: المصدر أونلاين, lit. 'The Source Online') is a Yemeni online newspaper. It was originally established in 2007 as the printed weekly newspaper Al-Masdar, (Note: Arabic: المصدر, lit. 'The Source') with the daily online version later launching in 2009. The newspaper frequently came in conflict with the Yemeni government due to its reporting, and had become a top newspaper in the country by 2010. The newspaper extensively covered the Yemeni revolution; one of its photojournalists, Jamal al-Sharabi, was the first reporter to be killed by security forces during the protests. The printed newspaper was converted to a daily in 2012, but was forced to shut down in 2015 after the Houthis raided their offices in Sanaa. Since then, the newspaper has operated exclusively in a digital manner and remains one of the largest publications in Yemen, noted for its independence.

== History ==
The Al-Masdar newspaper was first launched in printed form on 13 November 2007. It was published on a weekly basis on Tuesdays. Its website was later launched in mid-2009, operating instead in a daily format.

An article written by Al-Masdar contributor Munir Mawari in May 2009 saw him criticize the Yemeni military's conduct during the Houthi insurgency and likened the rule of President Ali Abdullah Saleh to a weapon of mass destruction. In response, the Yemeni government's press court tried and sentenced him in absentia on 31 October 2009 to a two-year prison sentence and a lifetime ban on practicing journalism, while Al-Masdar editor-in-chief Samir Jubran was also given a one-year suspended sentence and a ban on journalist activities for that period. Jubran said the sentence was politically charged and that he would appoint another staff member to run Al-Masdar Online during the timeframe.

The Al-Masdar Online website was blocked in Yemen in February 2010, while Jubran and four other journalists from the newspaper were charged with "disturbing public order, inciting regionalism and threatening national unity", although they among other journalists were pardoned by Saleh on 8 June, with the newspapers' website becoming accessible again shortly afterwards. Al-Masdar Online was ranked the foremost leading news website in Yemen during 2010 according to "an evaluation carried out by Yemeni websites, prominent journalists and readers" cited by Yemen Times. Articles published by the newspaper include a report which documented the stories of 500 alleged slaves in Yemen. Al-Masdar was one of the few newspapers in Yemen to cover the United States diplomatic cables leaks at the end of 2010, which implicated Saleh in lying about US military operations in the country and boasting about whiskey.

Amidst its coverage of the Yemeni revolution, the Al-Masdar Online website went down on 26 February 2011 for the fifth time since its opening. Editor-in-chief Yaser Al-Arami accused the National Security Bureau of facilitating the shutdown due to the newspapers' coverage of the protests. Al-Masdar photojournalist Jamal al-Sharabi was among the 52 people killed by security forces at a demonstration in Sanaa on 18 March, becoming the first journalist who was killed during the revolution. Al-Masdar continued to report on the revolution in support of the opposition. The pro-regime Republican Guard seized 3,000 copies of the newspaper at a Sanaa checkpoint on 5 July.

Restrictions on journalism in Yemen were relaxed the aftermath of the revolution and the removal of Saleh from power, leading to the Al-Masdar editorial board deciding to convert the newspaper to a daily format in order to better keep up with events in the country. The newspaper stopped publishing issues in mid-2012 until 9 December, when the conversion was officially announced and implemented.

On 17 April 2013, a bomb at the entrance to Al-Masdar's offices in Sanaa, which also house the Yemen Youth TV channel, was spotted and later defused by authorities. No entity claimed responsibility for the incident, but Ministry of Interior experts speaking to Al-Masdar noted the bomb was similar to those used by intelligence services. Deputy editor-in-chief Ali Al-Faqih said their staff felt threatened but would continue to work unabated; security was also increased at the newspaper thereon.

After their capture of Sanaa and subsequent takeover of Yemen, the Houthis cracked down on independent media including Al-Masdar Online. Jubran reported that the newspapers' staff had suffered harassment by the Houthis for weeks before their Sanaa offices were ransacked and several staff members detained on 26 March 2015, the latter whom were released the following day. Al-Masdar Online resumed operations in a digital-only format based outside of Houthi-controlled Yemen where it is banned, retiring its printed version. It remains a leading news website in Yemen as of 2026.

== Organization and positions ==
Prior to the shutdown of its printed version, the Al-Masdar Media Foundation operated two main platforms, the printed newspaper Al-Masdar and the digital version Al-Masdar Online. It is published in the Arabic language, but also maintains an English language version, Al-Masdar Online English.

The newspapers' operations consist of "a small core staff that select and revise the content provided by freelance correspondents based all over the country. However, since these stringers are rarely professional journalists, they are slow to produce content which often requires heavy editing." Its success was attributed by an editor to its coverage of breaking news and multimedia usage.

Al-Masdar Online is an independent Yemeni news source, and "carries largely balanced coverage" politics-wise according to BBC Monitoring. The newspaper has been characterized as supportive of Islah, and critical of the Houthis and the Southern Transitional Council.
