= Syria–Yemen relations =

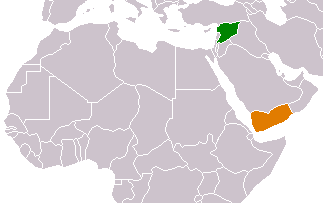
- Syria: Yemen

Syria–Yemen relations refer to the relationship between Yemen and Syria. Yemen has an embassy in Damascus; while Syria has an embassy in Sanaa. Both are members of the Arab League. Both countries generally enjoy good relations and currently have ongoing civil wars, the Syrian Civil War and the Yemeni Civil War.

== History ==
In January 2007 Yemeni Prime Minister Abdul Qadir Bajamal arrived in Damascus for a three-day visit and meetings of the joint Syrian-Yemeni Higher Committee to boost the two countries' bilateral cooperation.

In May 2008 The Yemeni-Syrian Higher Joint Committee held a meeting in Sana'a, co-chaired by Yemen's Prime Minister Dr. Ali Muhammad Mujawar and his Syrian counterpart Muhammad Naji al-Otari. The two states affirmed their firm support for the establishment of security and peace in the Middle East.

The 10th session of the Yemeni–Syrian Higher Committee concluded in August 2010 with the signing of 14 documents including cooperation agreements, programs and protocols.

On the 20th anniversary of the Yemeni unification, Yemeni Ambassador in Damascus Abdel-Wahhab Tawaf said the united Yemen was an example for the inter-Arab relations as they should be, adding that this unity enabled Yemen to play its pan-Arab role aiming at enhancing joint Arab action and cooperation with brotherly countries. Tawaf hailed Syria's supportive stances to Yemen's stability and security, adding he is proud of President Bashar al-Assad's efforts regarding pan-Arab issues and strengthening Arab partnership ties.

In February 2011 Yemen and Syria talked on the possibility of enhancing cooperation between the two countries in fields of theater and cinema. Culture Minister Mohammad al-Maflahi and Syrian ambassador to Yemen Abdul Ghafor Sabouni reviewed means to send Syrian trainers for training Yemeni cadres in areas of script writing, directing film and theater.

=== Syrian Civil War ===
In 2011, Yemen was showing unconditional support to the Syrian government, and is one of the few Arab countries that has supported President Bashar al-Assad. In addition, Yemeni Shiite militias, such as Houthis have also showed support for Assad and has sent militiamen to Syria to fight for the government. Besides Lebanon, Yemen was the only Arab league member absent on a vote to expel Syria from the respective organization. In February 2012 Yemeni Opposition Parliament member Mohammed Nassar al-Hazmi described the step taken by GCC states in expelling Syrian ambassadors and withdrawing Gulf diplomats from Syria as a good and positive, demanding that the Yemeni government to take a similar procedure and expel the Syrian ambassador in Yemen. One month later, in March 2012 a diplomat of the Foreign Affairs Ministry said the Yemeni government could ask the Syrian Ambassador to leave Yemen. Also, Yemeni protesters have been taking to streets, condemning what they dubbed as massacres committed by the Syrian government against the Syrian people, demanding the Yemeni government to immediately expel the Syrian Ambassador.

=== Yemen Crisis ===
The conflict, which roots in the Arab Spring, in Yemen broke out when the longtime authoritarian leader – Ali Abdullah Saleh – handed over his power to his deputy, Abdrabbuh Mansour Hadi, in 2011. The uprise was supposed to give some stability to Yemen however president Hadi had trouble dealing with problems which includes jihadist attacks, separatist movement in the south, the continuing loyalty of security personnel to Saleh along with corruption, unemployment and food insecurity. Because of such instability, the Houthi movement took advantage by taking control of their northern heartland of Saada province and neighboring areas. Many ordinary Yemenis who were disillusioned with the transition, supported the Houthis movement which in result, forced president Hadi to flee abroad in March 2015. Alarmed by such uprise, Saudi Arabia and seven other Arab states started a campaign in effort to restore Mr. Hadi's government. The coalition of those Arab states received support from the US, UK and France.
