= Belquis Al Lahabi =

- بلقيس الذهبي
- Born: 1972 (age 53–54); Sana'a, Yemen
- Occupations: Political activist, organizer, speaker
- Organization: Arab Sisters Forum for Human Rights

Belquis Al Lahabi (Arabic: بلقيس الذهبي; b. 1972) is a Yemeni civil and feminist political activist, organizer, and figure in the Yemeni revolution. Throughout her life, she became increasingly involved with political and activist organizations, mostly in the realm of women's rights, human rights, and political freedom. She was a speaker at the 2018 Oslo Freedom Forum.

== Early life and activism ==
Al Lahabi was born in 1972 to a poor family in Sana'a, Yemen, in a society she describes as "traditional but colorful, [where] women participated in everything" during day to day life. As she grew older during the 1980s, she noted society growing stricter, with conflicts around the status of women.

In 2006, Al Lahabi became one of the leaders of a coalition of social movement organizations which protested the government with tactics such as sit-ins and protests. She was one of the organizers of a 2007 forum against the civil war between the government and the Houthi movement.

== Arab Spring and Yemeni revolution ==
As they observed the Tunisian Revolution in 2011, she and the other protestors took note of the possibility of toppling a regime through civilian action, which they saw Tunisia had achieved. During the early protests, she and other protestors demonstrated in front of the Tunisian Embassy in Yemen; Al Lahabi spoke to an Al Jazeera reporter with a message for Ali Abdullah Saleh, then-president of Yemen: "I hope that the movement progresses and for the fall of the regime of Ali Abdullah Saleh, who threatened us with Afghanization, Iraqization, and Somalization. Today, we say to him, we threaten him with Tunisization!" To The New York Times, she noted that, initially, women led many protests and many of the issues raised were on maternal mortality, child marriage, and the uneven burden of illiteracy and poverty on women – though by the end of the first month, women were beaten in the town square they once led.

After Saleh's fall in 2012, the National Dialogue Conference was organized as part of the Yemeni crisis reconciliation efforts. 30% of the seats were reserved for women, Al Lahabi being one of them. Though she attempted to raise specific women's issues, she and the other women were pushed back again, with scarce advancement during the revolution in which women had played a central role. In an interview, she noted the continuing violent conflicts between various factions in the country and that even progressive government officials and women continued stating that it was not the right time for women's freedom.

== Aftermath ==
In April 2015, shelling destroyed Al Lahabi's house and forced her into exile; she fled to Jordan with no desire to return.

Al Lahabi was one of the speakers at the 2018 Oslo Freedom Forum and spoke on nonviolent resistance against authoritarianism.
