= Battle of Amran =

Summer 2014 battle in Yemen

- Part of the Houthi insurgency and Yemeni crisis
Date	4–10 July 2014 (6 days)
Location	'Amran, Yemen
Result	Decisive Houthi victory; Fall of Al Ahmar reign in Amran; Houthis eventually launch a new offensive to capture the capital Sanaa

Belligerents
Republic of Yemen; Security Forces; Al-Islah militias	Houthis

Commanders and leaders
(Yemen) Hameed Al-Qushaibi † (Yemen) Abdrabbuh Hadi	Abdul-Malik al-Houthi; Mohammed Ali al-Houthi; Mohammed Abdul Salam

Units involved
310th Armored Brigade	

Casualties and losses
- 460 killed and 180 wounded from all the sides including civilians
- 81,000 people displaced from the region during October 2013-February 2014 Another 10,000 families displaced in the July

The battle of 'Amran was a battle that took place in July 2014 between the Houthi rebels and the Yemeni government of President Abdrabbuh Mansur Hadi. The government's forces consisted of units belonging to the 310th Armored Brigade, which is backed by Al-Islah loyalists, of which the Al Ahmar clan of Hashid tribes hailed from. The Houthis eventually won the battle, ending the Al Ahmar reign in Amran, and eventually leading them to the capture of Sanaa.

== Background ==
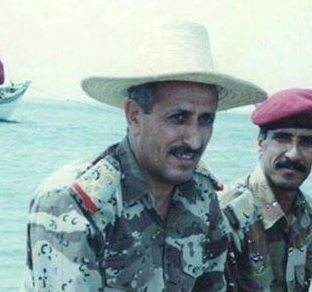
Hameed Al-Qushaibi in 2004

=== Houthi-Islah tensions ===
Since 2014, Houthi rebels have established control Saada Governorate following their decisive victories in Sadaa and Dammaj. They have begun to set their sights on Amran as it hosts the powerful Al Ahmar family of the Hashid tribal confederation, whom the family has strong ties with Al Islah Islamist party.

Despite their temporal alliance against former president Ali Abdullah Saleh during the 2011 uprising, tensions between Houthi rebels and Islah loyalists have risen due to differences over the latter role of Sadaa Wars in fighting against Houthi insurgents, as well as ideological and sectarian differences from each other.

=== Clashes in rural Amran ===
Houthi rebels have already briefly clashed with Islah-backed forces in Sadaa, Al Jawf and Hajjah. Since February 2014, they began engaging with tribal forces loyal to Al Islah in the rural regions of Amran, when they first attacked the government held areas from mountains around them.

During the first week of the clashes, an estimated number of 7,100 people, left the city, and some 450,000 to be inside the regions of the 'Amran Governorate. 81,000 residents have abandoned the town since October 2013.

In March 2014, Houthis have demanded that the government to replace leading government officials in Amran held by Al Islah loyalists. Although president Hadi has partly conceded to the Houthis' demands by appointing Mohammed Saleh Shamlan as the new governor of Amran on 8 June, the changes did not include Brigadier-General Hameed Al-Qushaibi, who the Houthis allege is acting in the interests of Islah.

Hadi government has been reluctant to send forces to support the 310th Armored Brigade fight against Houthi rebels, thus leaving Amran to be the only battleground between Houthi and Islah forces. As a result, Houthi forces were able to advance and taking control most of rural areas in Amran. A ceasefire brokered by Hadi government was reached in June 2014. However, it did not last long until 4 July, when the main battle slowly approaches Amran city itself.

== The main battle ==
On 8 July 2014, Houthi rebels stormed the city of Amran, guarded by the general Hameed Al-Qushaibi. Army reinforcements belonging to units of 310th Armored Brigade clashing with Houthi rebels in Dharawan, 15 kilometres (nine miles) from Sanaa, and in and around the city itself. On the same day, government fighter jets bombed Amran's Warak neighborhood, hours after it was seized by Houthi rebels. At least 460 people were dead and some 160 to be wounded during the 1st day of the battle, which includes civilians.

The fighting continues on next day in 9 July. Houthi rebels managed to advance inside the city and take large swathes of the city neighbourhood. The Houthis stormed in the headquarters of the 310th Armored Brigade, looted weapons and equipment there, and killed a number of soldiers and officers. The rebels finally captured the leader of 310th Armored Brigade, Brigadier-General Hameed Al-Qushaibi, and killed him during the battle.

The Houthi fighters has brokered the deal between them and 310th Armored Brigade forces, of which Houthis allowed the troops to abandon the city, and bringing an end to the fight in Amran. By 10 July, Amran was fully captured by the Houthi rebels.

A new pact was made between the government and Houthis in which Houthis will retreat from Amran city, but the pact never took place, allowing the Houthis to set their sights on Sanaa later on.

== Aftermath ==
After the fall of Amran in August, the Houthis began holding mass demonstrations in Sana'a, pressuring President Abd Rabbuh Mansur Hadi to reverse a cut to fuel subsidies and calling on the government to step down. Representatives of the group met with government officials in an attempt to find a solution to the standoff, but the Houthis rejected the government's concessions as insufficient. On 9 September, Houthi protesters in northwest Sana'a were fired upon by security forces as they marched on the cabinet office. Seven were killed. the Houthis, finally stormed the Sana'a in 16 September, and captured in 21 of the month.

== Conspiracy theories ==
During a film by Al Jazeera, some officials with hidden faces claimed that the fall of Amran was allowed by the Hadi government, to eventually remove General al-Qushaibi from power, eventually lead him in death, and the capital on the Houthis. Many believe that the Houthis and Hadi were concerted to leave Amran to fall to the Houthis.
