= Mohammed Ali al-Ahwal =

Yemeni banker and diplomat (1950-2013)

Mohammed Ali Mohsen al Ahwal
- Mohammed Ali Mohsen al Ahwal
- Born: 12 December 1950; Bayhan District, Yemen
- Died: 13 December 2013 (aged 63); King Faisal Specialist Hospital, Riyadh, Saudi Arabia
- Occupations: Banker, diplomat
- Known for: Ambassador to Saudi Arabia

Mohammed Ali Mohsen al-Ahwal (Arabic: محمد علي محسن الأحول; 12 December 1950 – 13 December 2013) was a Yemeni banker and diplomat who was the director general of the Central Bank of Yemen from 1985 to 1995, and held various other senior government positions. He was ambassador to Saudi Arabia between 2005 and 2012. In March 2011 he publicly sided with the youth protesters who were demanding a change of government during the Yemeni Revolution.

== Early life and education ==
Al-Ahwal was born in Bayhan District, Yemen on 12 December 1950. He was from the Almusobein tribe of Ain District of Shabwa. (Note: Al-Ahwal's brother, Ahmed Ali Mohsen al-Ahwal, became a brigadier general and governor of al Mahwit Governorate. In December 2013 there were armed clashes between Salafis and Houthi tribespeople in the area east of Sanaa, with both sides erecting road blocks. Ahmed Ali al-Ahwal survived an ambush of his motorcade, which was returning from his village in Shabwa.) Al-Ahwal attended elementary and middle school in Yemen, then moved to Egypt to pursue his secondary education and university studies. He graduated with a Bachelor of Commerce and Economics degree from Ain Shams University in 1974. He also earned a degree in Finance and Economics from the University of Ottawa in Canada and received a certificate from the International Monetary Fund in Washington. His study areas included finance policies, financing, central and commercial banking, computing and investment.

== Career ==
In 1975, al-Ahwal began working for the Central Bank of Yemen. He served as Director General of the bank from 1985 to 1995. Al-Ahwal was a member of the General Committee of the General People's Congress from 1990 to 1998. He was a member of the Presidential Council from 1991 to 1994. In 1992, he was promoted to Deputy Prime Minister (Finance). Al-Ahwal received the Order of Yemeni Unity in 1994. He was in charge of land and real estate in Yemen between 1995 and 1998. In 1998, al-Ahwal was appointed Consul General in Jeddah, Saudi Arabia, with ambassadorial rank, a position he held until 2005.

Al-Ahwal was appointed Ambassador Extraordinary and Plenipotentiary of the Republic of Yemen to Saudi Arabia by presidential decree of 19 November 2005. He was also Permanent Representative to the Organization of the Islamic Conference in Jeddah, and Yemen's ambassador to the General Secretariat of the Gulf Cooperation Council. One of the issues he addressed was the condition of Yemeni refugees displaced by conflict between the Yemeni government and the Houthis. The Saudis were refusing to aid refugees and turning them back to Yemen. In a meeting in Riyadh in April 2010 to discuss this issue with Abdul Rahman bin Hamad Al Attiyah, secretary general of the Gulf Cooperation Council, Al-Ahwal was assured that the Arab states of the Persian Gulf saw Yemen's security as part of their security.

On 21 March 2011, The Guardian reported that al-Ahwal had resigned in sympathy with the youth revolution in Yemen. According to Al Jazeera, Ahwal had said "I announce my support for the youth revolution, and for change in Yemen" but his statement did not make it clear whether he was leaving his post or resigning from Saleh's ruling party. The protesters were demanding the departure of President Ali Abdullah Saleh. Al-Ahwal's statement followed similar steps from dozens of military and tribal leaders in Yemen. The Yemeni ambassador in Egypt, Abdul-Wali al-Shameri, said that the ambassadors who had announced they were joining the rebels would continue to represent the Yemeni people in Egypt and the Arab League.

In April 2013, it was reported that al-Ahwal had been recalled from his post as acting ambassador to Saudi Arabia after the signature of a memorandum of understanding on Yemeni expatriates with Saudi recruitment firms. The Saudi authorities were escalating efforts to deport Yemeni workers who were not covered by contracts. There was some confusion over whether the report reflected the official Yemeni position. It was later reported that Al-Ahwal had resigned seven months earlier and was now based in Sanaa.

== Death ==
Al-Ahwal died at dawn on Friday 13 December 2013 at the King Faisal Specialist Hospital in Riyadh, to which he had been admitted several days earlier. He was aged 63. His body was taken to the Yemeni capital of Sanaa. The ministry of foreign affairs organized a memorial service for him under the patronage of President Abdrabbuh Mansour Hadi, President of the Republic, attended by many diplomats, politicians and public figures. He was praised for his work in assisting Yemeni expatriates in Saudi Arabia and his role in the development of relations between Yemen and Saudi Arabia. Ali Abdullah Saleh, president of the General People's Congress, was among those who sent telegrams of condolences.
