= Fathi Tawfiq Abdulrahim =

Yemeni politician

Tawfiq Abdulrahim was a Yemeni politician and businessman. He quit his position as head of the Finance Committee of Parliament over the Yemeni revolution. He was a prominent businessman who owned major oil business companies in Yemen. He died on 12 September 2013.
