= Abdel-Malik Mansour =

Yemeni diplomat

Abdel-Malik Mansour Al-Masabi is a Yemeni diplomat. On 22 March 2011, he announced his support of the rebels in the 2011 Yemeni uprising, causing president Ali Abdullah Saleh to replace him in April 2011 as Yemeni representative to the Arab League. On 25 September 2011, Mansour accused Saleh of sending an assassination squad to murder him in his home in Cairo.

== Education ==
Ph.D. Tunis El Manar University (Sociology), 2007.

Ph.D. Sanaa University (Philosophy), 2000.

M.A. Sana’a university (Law), 1995.

B.A. Sana’a university (Law), 1977.

== Publications ==
- FUTURE PROSPECTS OF THE HUMAN SOCIETY.
- EMIGRATION PHENOMENON: CASE OF YEMEN.
- ISLAM & INTERNATIONAL RELATIONS.
- THE HUMAN RIGHTS ORIGINS: ISLAMIC PERSPECTIVE.
- CONFLICT & DIALOGUE ISLAMIC PERSPECTIVE.
- ORIGINS OF ISLAMIC JURISPRUDENCE AND IJTIHAD: A CRITIQUE OF AL-SHOWKANI’S PERCEPTIONS.
- ISLAM & GLOBALIZATION.
- INSURRECTION: A STUDY INTO ARMED POLITICAL CONFLICT.
