= Lawder =

Lawder is a surname. Notable people with the surname include:

- Edward James Lawder (1821–1900), British military officer
- Harry C. Lawder (1844–1921), American politician
- Margaret Lawder (1900–1983), Irish and South African botanist
- Nicole Lawder (born 1962), Australian politician
- Robert R. Lawder (died 1967), American politician
- Standish Lawder (1936–2014), American artist and historian
