= 2005 Yemeni uprising =

The 2005 Yemeni uprising was a nationwide revolution and popular protest movement against president Ali Abdullah Saleh after fuel price hikes on 19 July. Mass protests first broke out in Aden on 20 July, but spread nationwide between 20 and 23 July. Growing mass street protests, massive civil disobedience and disturbances, and increasingly violent street demonstrations characterised by riots and Civil disorder hit and rocked Yemen, mainly Sanaa and Aden. The rioting and uprising consisted of lobbying, rallies, looting, arson attacks and battles between police and demonstrators. In Hudaydah, thousands demonstrated against fuel price hikes and soon, Stone-throwing took place and 8 were killed. 36 were killed in the bloody crackdowns, in which the military was deployed to disperse and quell the mass uprising by using live ammunition and rubber bullets to dispel the fuel price hike movement and anti-government revolt.

== See also ==
- Yemeni Revolution
- 2014 Yemeni Revolution
