= Yahya Hussain Al-Aarashi =

Yemeni diplomat and government minister

- يحيى حسين العرشي

Minister of Foreign Affairs of Yemen Arab Republic
- In office 1984–1990

Personal details
- Born: Yemen Arab Republic
- Profession: diplomat, politician

Yahya Hussain Al-Aarashi (Arabic: يحيى بن حسين العرشي; born 1947) is a Yemeni diplomat and politician. Starting in the 1960s he held positions in Al Hudaydah Governorate. By the 1970s he was directing a Yemeni Development bank. He served as minister of culture and information in 1976. From 1986 until 1990 he served as minister of state for unity affairs. From 1993 until 1999 he served as minister of culture and tourism.

He quit his position as ambassador to Qatar over the Yemeni revolution.

== Sources ==
- Publitec Publications (2011). Who's Who in the Arab World 2007–2008. Walter de Gruyter. pp. 112–113. ISBN 978-3-11-093004-7.
