= Mohammad Sewar =

Yemeni politician

Mohammad Ali Ahmed Sewar is a Yemeni politician. He quit his position as Assistant Secretary General of the Cabinet over the 2011 Yemeni uprising.

== See also ==
- Politics of Yemen
