= Ahmad Daifallah Al-Azeib =

Yemeni diplomat (died 2022)

Ahmad Daifallah Al-Azeib (Arabic: أحمد ضيف الله العزيب) was a Yemeni diplomat. He served as ambassador to Saudi Arabia, France, the United Kingdom, Libya, and Oman. He quit his position as ambassador to Oman over the Yemeni revolution. He died on 18 March 2022.
