= Mohamed Saleh Qara'a =

Yemeni politician

Mohamed Saleh Qara'a is a Yemeni politician. He quit his position as a ruling party member over the 2011 Yemeni uprising.
