= Abdu Ali Abdul Rahman =

Yemeni diplomat

Abdu Ali Abdul Rahman al-Shawafi (Arabic: عبده علي عبدالرحمن الشوافي) was a Yemeni diplomat. He quit his position as ambassador to Pakistan over the Yemeni revolution. He was later reported to have resumed his role. He previously served as the deputy minister of foreign affairs of first South Yemen and then united Yemen until 1998. He also served as ambassador to Russia and Syria. He served as the head of the Taiz branch of the General People's Congress party and as a member of the Shura Council. He helped demarcate the border between Saudi Arabia and Yemen. On 13 November 2019, he received a call from former Yemeni president Ali Abdullah Saleh's son Ahmed, to reassure him of his health after undergoing heart surgery in a hospital in Pakistan. He died on 20 January 2024.
