= Hameed Al-Qushaibi =

Brigadier in the Yemeni army (1956-2014)

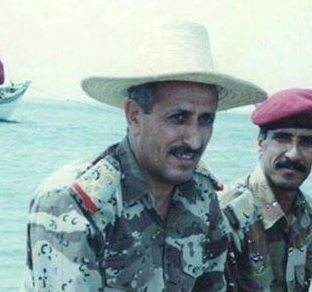
- Hameed Al-Qushaibi in 2004
- Born: 1956; Khamir District, 'Amran Governorate, North Yemen (present-day Yemen)
- Died: 8 July 2014 (aged 57–58) 'Amran, Yemen
- Military career
- Allegiance: Yemen
- Branch: Yemen Army
- Service years: 1977–2014
- Rank: Brigadier general
- Commands: 310th Armoured Brigade (1978—2014)
- Conflicts: Yemeni Civil War (1994); Yemeni revolution Houthi insurgency: Battle of Amran †

Hameed bin Hameed Mansour Al-Qushaibi Al-Hashidi (Arabic: حميد بن حميد منصور القشيبي الحاشدي, romanized: Ḥamīd ibn Ḥamīd Manṣūr alqshyby al-Ḥāshidī; 1 January 1956 – c. 9 July 2014) was a Yemeni brigadier in the Yemeni Army. He quit his position as Head of the 310th armoured Brigade in the 'Amran Governorate during the Yemeni revolution. He later resumed his position, but was reportedly killed in 2014 by Houthi militants during the Battle of Amran on 9 July.
