= Abdulwahed Mohamed Fara =

Yemeni diplomat (born 1949)

Abdulwahed Mohamed Fara (Arabic: عبد الواحد محمد فارع; born 1949) is a Yemeni diplomat. He served as ambassador to Indonesia from 1995 until he quit over the 2011 Yemeni uprising. In 1983 he was appointed as ambassador to Kuwait, serving in that role as well as the non-resident ambassador to Bahrain, Qatar, and Oman from 1984 until 1987. From 1987 to 1990, he served as ambassador to Tunisia and as permanent representative to the Arab League as well as the non-resident ambassador to Morocco from 1988. From 1990 to 1995, he served as the director general for the planning department at the ministry of foreign affairs. On 17 March 1998, he was appointed as ambassador to Singapore. He later served as ambassador to the United Arab Emirates.
