= Nasser Eljahori =

Yemeni army officer

Nasser Eljahori is a Yemeni Brigadier in the Yemeni army. He quit his position as Head of Brigade 121 over the 2011 Yemeni uprising.
