= Ali Taysir =

Yemeni politician

Ali Taysir is a Yemeni politician. He quit his position as undersecretary at the Human Rights Ministry over the 2011 Yemeni uprising.
