= Abdallah al-Qahdi =

Yemeni brigadier in the Yemeni army

- Allegiance: Yemen
- Branch: Yemeni Land Forces

Abdallah al-Qahdi is a Yemeni brigadier in the Yemeni army. He quit his position as a senior military general from Aden over the Yemeni revolution.
