= Marwan Abdullah Abdulwahab Noman =

Yemeni diplomat

Marwan Abdullah Abdulwahab Noman is a Yemeni diplomat. He became the Yemeni ambassador to Japan in November 2007. He quit his position as ambassador over the 2011 Yemeni uprising but was denied by the government.
