= Jalal Faqira =

Yemeni politician

Jalal Faqirah
- جلال ابراهيم عبدالله فقيرة

Ambassador of Yemen to Jordan
- Incumbent
- Assumed office 3 April 2023
- Preceded by: Ali Al-Imrani

Personal details
- Born: 26 May 1967 (age 59) Al Hudaydah, Yemen

Jalal Ibrahim Abdullah Faqira (Arabic: جلال ابراهيم عبدالله فقيرة; born 26 May 1967) is a Yemeni politician and diplomat. He has been serving as the ambassador of Yemen to Jordan since 3 April 2023. In 2011 he quit his position as a central committee member over the Yemeni uprising. He is a political scientist at Sanaa University.
