= Ismail ibn al-Ahmar =

Andalusian historian

Abū l-Walīd Ismāʿīl ibn Yūsuf Ibn al-Aḥmar (Arabic: أبو الوليد إسماعيل بن يوسف ابن الأحمر) (Granada? 1324/1326 – Fes 1404/1407) was an Andalusian historian of the fourteenth century, the time of the Marinid dynasty. He was a contemporary of Ibn Khaldun. He was the official historian of the Marinid dynasty.

Ismail Ibn al-Ahmar was born in Granada son of a Nasrid prince. He fled al-Andalus with his father as an infant and took refuge in present-day Morocco where he was welcomed by the Marinids. In addition to his works on history, he composed many works in poetry mainly in the praise of the Marinids and lamenting the feud with his royal cousin in Granada.

== Works ==
Books by Ibn al-Ahmar:

- Rawdat al-nisrin fi dawlat Bani Marin (written in 1404) A defense of Marinid policies, attacking the Abdalwadid of the Kingdom of Tlemcen.
- Nafha al-nisriniyya
- Nathir faraid al-djuman fi nazm fuhul al-azam, ed. Muhammad Ridwan al-Daya (Beyrouth 1967)

== See also ==
- Ibn abd al-Malik al-Murrakushi
