= Wadi al Ahmar =

Coordinates: 30°59′41.91″N 17°29′14.96″E

Wadi-al-Ahmar, also known as Wadi-al-Hamra, is a place in Libya's Sirte District. In English, its name translates to "the red valley". Wadi-al-Ahmar is located just over 100km east of Sirte, the hometown of former Libyan leader Muammar Gaddafi and the capital of the Libyan Arab Jamahiriya remnants.

The National Transitional Council claimed its forces took control of the area on 8 September 2011, nearly two weeks after the fall of Tripoli.
