= Jamal al-Sharabi =

Yemeni photojournalist (1976-2011)

Jamal al-Sharabi جمال الشرعبي
- Born: c. 1976; Republic of Yemen
- Died: March 18, 2011 (aged 34–35); Sana'a, Republic of Yemen
- Cause of death: Gunshot wound
- Occupation: Photojournalist
- Children: 4

Jamal Ahmad al-Sharabi, (Arabic: جمال احمد الشرعبي, c. 1976 – 18 March 2011) was a Yemeni photojournalist with the independent weekly, Al-Masdar, in Sana'a, Yemen.

Jamal al-Sharabi was the first journalist in Yemen to die while covering the 2011–2012 Yemeni revolution, which were part of the Arab Spring. He was one of 50 who were killed by Yemeni security forces, and 600 others were injured, during a demonstration against President Ali Abdullah Saleh held on March 18, 2011.

== Personal ==
Jamal al-Sharabi was thirty-five years old and he was a father to four children.

== Career ==
Jamal al-Sharaabi was employed as a photographer for the independent weekly newspaper, Al-Masdar. [Not verified as al-Sharaabi was not mentioned in the linked article: update info]

== Death ==
Jamal al-Sharabi was killed in the capital city Sana'a, Yemen.

Jamal Ahmed al-Sharabi was shot when authorities fired on the protesters in Sana'a on Change Square, in the capital of Yemen, while he was reporting on the scene. Many of the dead were shot in the neck and head, with the bodies being left in the streets.

=== Events leading up to his death ===
External videos
- Raw Video: Yemeni Forces Open Fire on Protesters on YouTube

At least 45 anti-government protesters died and over 200 were injured as unidentified gunmen opened fire on them in Sana'a. Jamal al-Sharabi, a thirty-five-year-old Yemeni photojournalist, was killed in the attack, marking the first journalist death of the protests.

It has been reported that the attackers were pro-government gunmen, though Saleh said that his security forces did not open fire and were even unarmed at the time. There are also reports that some of the protesters who were injured in the attack were taken away in national security vehicles to a local prison for treatment instead of to a regular hospital, sparking fears that the injured will be further harassed. Tens of thousands of people also took to the streets in other cities across the country.

Saleh declared a state of emergency across the country, while state media blamed the violence on "clashes among citizens." The Common Forum, a coalition of the opposition parties led by Ali Mohammed al-Sabry, condemned the shootings.

The Washington Post reported that US President Barack Obama and US Secretary of State Hillary Clinton and French President Nicolas Sarkozy had condemned the attack.

=== Impact ===
Irina Bokova, director-general of UNESCO expressed great disapproval for the death of Jamal Ahmed al-Sharabi during the attack that killed and injured of dozens of unarmed civilians on March 18, 2011. Jamal Ahmed al-Sharabi was among the first to be shot in front of the capital while covering a crowd of protesters. Irina Bokova said, "The killing of Jamal Ahmed al-Sharabi is an attack against the basic human right of the people of Yemen to freedom of expression." He continued by saying, "It is the duty of the authorities to ensure that journalists are able to carry out their professional duties in the safest possible conditions." In the year following the attacks the former president of Yemen, Ali Abdullah Saleh, threatened to arrest the Prime Minister Mohammed Salem Basindawa because of their differences in how the regime should be run. As a result, this has continued to increase tension between the new and former Yemeni regimes.

=== Reactions ===
As a reaction to Friday's government violence against the protesters, Yemen is now in a state of emergency.

The U.S. Secretary of State, Hillary Clinton, said the Yemeni people deserve the right to demonstrate peacefully, to freely assemble, and to express themselves without fear of being harmed. And United States President Barack Obama said he deplored the unrest in Yemen and mentioned that an international investigation was needed.

Even in the past, Ann Cooper, the executive director of CPJ, urged the Yemeni government to publicly condemn these types of brutal attacks against the media. She believes it is extremely important that law enforcement holds a proper investigation into such events in order for more there to be more accountability to the law.

== See also ==
- List of journalists killed in Yemen
