= Khirbet ar-Ras al-Ahmar =

- Place

Arabic transcription(s)
  - Arabic: خربة الراس الاحمر
- Location of Khirbet ar-Ras al-Ahmar within Palestine
- Coordinates: 32°16′4″N 35°27′27″E
- Palestine grid: 196/186
- State: State of Palestine
- Governorate: Tubas

Population (2017)
  - Total: 74

Khirbet ar-Ras al-Ahmar is a small Palestinian village in the Tubas Governorate of the West Bank. The village is located in Area C of the West Bank, and Israel has designated it a closed military zone for weapons training. In 2017, the village had 74 residents.
