= Abdul-Wali al-Shameri =

Yemeni diplomat, poet, and writer (born 1956)

Abdul-Wali al-Shameri (Arabic: عبدالولي الشميري; born 4 August 1956) is a Yemeni diplomat, poet, and writer. He quit his position as ambassador to Egypt over the Yemeni revolution. He was born on 4 August 1956 in Shamir province, Taiz Governorate. He is a Yemeni poet and writer. He resigned from his position as the Ambassador of Yemen to the Arab Republic of Egypt on 19 March 2011. Chairman of the Forum of Arab intellectuals Cairo and Chairman of the Foundation for creativity and culture Sanaa.
