= Rasm Al-Ahmar =

Rasm Al-Ahmar رسم الأحمر
- Village
- Location in Syria
- Coordinates: 35°19′15″N 37°29′18″E
- Country: Syria
- Governorate: Hama
- District: Salamiyah District
- Subdistrict: Al-Saan Subdistrict

Population (2004)
  - Total: 754
- Time zone: UTC+3 (AST)
- City Qrya Pcode: N/A

Rasm Al-Ahmar (Arabic: رسم الأحمر) is a Syrian village located in Al-Saan Subdistrict, Salamiyah District, Hama. According to the Syria Central Bureau of Statistics (CBS), Rasm Al-Ahmar had a population of 754 in the 2004 census.
