= Sam Yahya Al-Ahmar =

Yemeni politician

Sam Yahya Al-Ahmar is a Yemeni politician who served as deputy minister of culture from 24 July 2008 until resigning over the 2011 Yemeni uprising.
