= Edward James Lawder =

- Born: 1821
- Died: 2 March 1900 (aged 78–79); London
- Military career
- Allegiance: United Kingdom
- Branch: British Indian Army
- Service years: 1839–
- Rank: General
- Conflicts: Indian Rebellion of 1857

General Edward James Lawder (1821 - 2 March 1900) was a British Indian Army officer.

== Military career ==
Lawder was born in 1821, and entered the army in 1839. He served in India during the Indian Rebellion of 1857, as acting quartermaster-general with the Field Force established to relieve Saugor, taking part in the skirmish at Kubrai, the battle of Banda, the relief of Kirwee, and the storming of the heights of Punwarree. For his services he was mentioned in despatches and received the brevet rank of major. He transferred to the Madras Staff Corps, and received the brevet rank of colonel in 1871. He was promoted to major-general in 1881, and was placed on the unemployed supernumerary list in 1886. He was subsequently promoted to lieutenant-general in 1887, and received the rank of general on 1 March 1891.

General Lawder died at 36, Campden-hill-gardens, on 2 March 1900.

== Family ==
He was married to Dora Jane, who died in Kensington on 27 May 1877. They had children, including:

- James Ormsby Lawder, High Sheriff of Leitrim 1909
- Edward John Lawder, who married in Chuddeghat, Hyderabad on 28 November 1885 Madge Ellis, fifth daughter of George Ellis, of the Madras civil service
- Arthur Henry Lawder, who married in Oaklake, Manitoba on 1 December 1892 Blanche Adeline Luff, second daughter of John W. Luff, of Old House, Blandford
- Dora Ellen Lawder, who married in 1874 Francis G. Bertram, of Beaulieu, Jersey, Lieutenant of the 86th (Royal County Down) Regiment of Foot

== Arms ==
Coat of arms of Edward James Lawder

Notes
Posthumously confirmed 20 August 1913 by Nevile Rodwell Wilkinson, Ulster King of Arms.
Crest
A solan goose standing on one leg on a rock all Proper.
Torse
Of the colours.
Escutcheon
Gules a griffin segreatn Argent charged on the breast with a trefoil slipped Vert within a double tressure flory counter flory of the second.
Motto
Sub Umbra Alarum Tuarum
