= Abdel-Wahhab Tawaf =

Yemeni diplomat

Abdel-Wahhab Hadi Mohsin Tawaf is a Yemeni diplomat. He quit his position as ambassador to Syria and as a member of the ruling General People's Congress party over the 2011 Yemeni uprising. He later served as a political adviser to the Yemeni ambassador in London from 2014 to 2018.
