= Hashid Abdullah al-Ahmar =

Yemeni politician

Hashid Abdullah al-Ahmar is a Yemeni politician who quit his position as Deputy Minister of Youth and Sports over the 2011 Yemeni uprising.
