= Mohammed al-Sabry =

Yemeni politician (died 2016)

Mohammed al-Sabry (also spelled al-Sabri) was a Yemeni politician and an opposition leader (also identified as a spokesman) for the Common Forum coalition of opposition parties (which includes Reform, Socialist, Nasserist, Popular Force and al-Haq) in the 2011 Yemeni protests. He had also been described as a spokesman for the opposition coalition known as the Joint Meeting Parties (JMP), which includes Islah, the country's largest Islamic party, as well as the Socialist Party and the Nasserite Party.

Sabry was a critic of the Houthi coup d'état in 2015, predicting it would lead to Yemen being isolated on the international and regional stage. He died on 25 November 2016.

== See also ==
- 2011 Yemeni protests
- Political parties in Yemen
