= Yemeni revolution =

Yemeni upheaval occurring simultaneously with the Arab Spring (2011)

- Part of the Arab Spring and the Yemeni Crisis
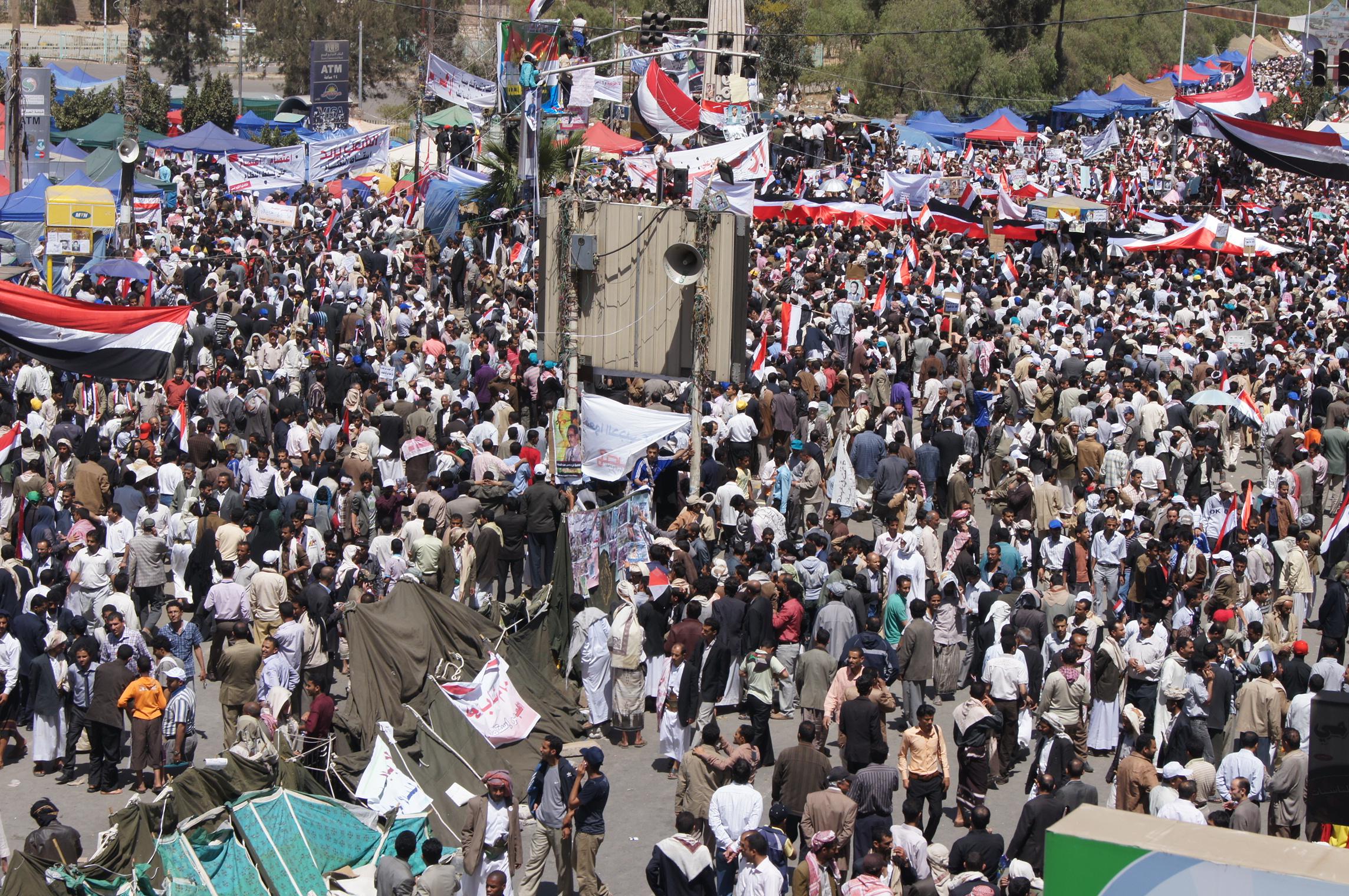
- Tens of thousands of protesters marching to Sanaa University, joined for the first time by opposition parties
- Date: 27 January 2011 – 27 February 2012 (1 year and 1 month)
- Location: Yemen
- Caused by: Economic conditions (poverty, unemployment); Authoritarianism and political corruption; Human rights violations; Government's proposals to modify the Constitution of Yemen to make Saleh president for life; Inspiration from concurrent regional protests
- Methods: Civil disobedience; Civil resistance; Demonstrations; Riots; Self-immolations; Strike actions; Mutiny; Defections; Insurgency; Non-violent revolutions; Armed confrontations between Hashid militiamen and loyalist soldiers.; Internet activism
- Result: Overthrow of Saleh government: Resignation of Prime Minister Mujawar; Resignation of MPs from the ruling party; Occupation of several regions and cities in Yemen by Al-Qaeda and Houthi rebels; AQAP declares the Islamic Emirate of Yemen; Restructure of the military forces by sacking several of its leaders; Approval of President's immunity from prosecution by Yemeni legislators; One candidate Presidential election held to replace Saleh as the new president of Yemen; Abdrabbuh Mansur Hadi elected and inaugurated

Parties
(Yemen) Opposition; Joint Meeting Parties; Al-Islah; Yemeni Socialist Party; Southern Movement; Houthis; Student activists; Hashid; Alliance of Yemeni Tribes; Defected soldiers; Civil Bloc; National Dialogue Committee	Government of Yemen; Yemeni Armed Forces; Yemeni Army; Yemeni Republican Guards; Yemeni Air Force; Ministry of Interior; Central Security Organization; General People's Congress

Lead figures
(Yemen) Sadiq al-Ahmar (Yemen) Ali Mohsen al-Ahmar (Yemen) Hameed Al-Qushaibi (South Yemen) Ali Salem al-Beidh; Abdul Malik al-Houthi	(Yemen) Ali Abdullah Saleh (Yemen) Abdrabbuh Mansour Hadi (Yemen) Ahmed Saleh (Yemen) Abdul Aziz Abdul Ghani (Yemen) Ahmed bin Saeed (Yemen) Ali Nasser Gatami †

Casualties
- Deaths: 2,000 (by 18 March 2012)
- Injuries: 22,000
- Arrested: 1,000

The Yemeni revolution, also known as the Yemeni intifada, was a series of major anti-government protests and armed uprisings that raged through Yemen from January 2011 to February 2012. It occurred concurrently with the Arab Spring that broke out throughout the Middle East and North Africa in 2011. In its early phase, protests in Yemen were initially against unemployment, economic conditions, corruption, and the authoritarian regime led by President Ali Abdullah Saleh as well as against the government's proposals to modify Yemen's constitution. The protesters' demands then escalated to calls for the resignation of Saleh. Mass defections from the military, as well as from Saleh's government, effectively rendered much of the country outside of the government's control, and protesters vowed to defy its authority.

A major demonstration of over 16,000 protesters took place in Sanaa, Yemen's capital, on 27 January. On 2 February, Saleh announced he would not run for reelection in 2013 and that he would not pass power to his son. On 3 February, 20,000 people protested against the government in Sanaa, while others protested in Aden, a southern Yemeni seaport city, in a "Day of Rage" called for by Tawakkol Karman, while soldiers, armed members of the General People's Congress and many protesters held a pro-government rally in Sanaa. In a "Friday of Anger" on 18 February, tens of thousands of Yemenis took part in anti-government demonstrations in Taiz, Sanaa and Aden. On a "Friday of No Return" on 11 March, protesters called for Saleh's ousting in Sanaa where three people were killed. More protests were held in other cities, including Mukalla, where one person was killed. On 18 March, protesters in Sanaa were fired upon, resulting in 52 deaths and ultimately culminating in mass defections and resignations.

Starting in late April, Saleh agreed to a Gulf Cooperation Council-brokered deal, only to back away hours before the scheduled signing three times. After the third time, on 22 May, the GCC declared it was suspending its efforts to mediate in Yemen. On 23 May, a day after Saleh refused to sign the transition agreement, Sheikh Sadiq al-Ahmar, the head of the Hashid tribal federation, one of the most powerful tribes in the country, declared support for the opposition and his armed supporters came into conflict with loyalist security forces in the capital Sanaa. Heavy street fighting ensued, which included artillery and mortar shelling. Saleh and several others were injured and at least five people were killed by a 3 June bombing of the presidential compound when an explosion ripped through a mosque used by high-level government officials for prayer services. Reports conflicted as to whether the attack was caused by shelling or a planted bomb. The next day, Vice President Abdrabbuh Mansour Hadi took over as acting president while Saleh flew to Saudi Arabia to be treated. The crowds celebrated Saleh's transfer of power, but Yemeni officials insisted that Saleh's absence was temporary and he would soon return to Yemen to resume his duties of office.

In early July, the government rejected the opposition's demands, including the formation of a transitional council with the goal of formally transferring power from the current administration to a caretaker government intended to oversee Yemen's first-ever democratic elections. In response, factions of the opposition announced the formation of their own 17-member transitional council on 16 July, though the Joint Meeting Parties (JMP) that have functioned as an umbrella for many of the Yemeni opposition groups during the uprising said the council did not represent them and did not match their "plan" for the country.

On 23 November, Saleh signed a power-transfer agreement brokered by the Gulf Cooperation Council in Riyadh, under which he would transfer his power to his vice-president, Abdrabbuh Mansour Hadi, within 30 days and leave his post as president by February 2012, in exchange for immunity from prosecution. Although the GCC deal was accepted by the JMP, it was rejected by many of the protesters and the Houthis. A presidential election was held in Yemen on 21 February 2012, with Hadi running unopposed. A report claims that the election had a 65% turnout, with Hadi receiving 99.8% of the vote. Hadi took the oath of office in Yemen's parliament on 25 February 2012. Saleh returned home on the same day to attend Hadi's inauguration. After months of protests, Saleh resigned from the presidency on 27 February 2012 and formally transferred power to his successor, marking the end of his 33-year rule.

== Background ==
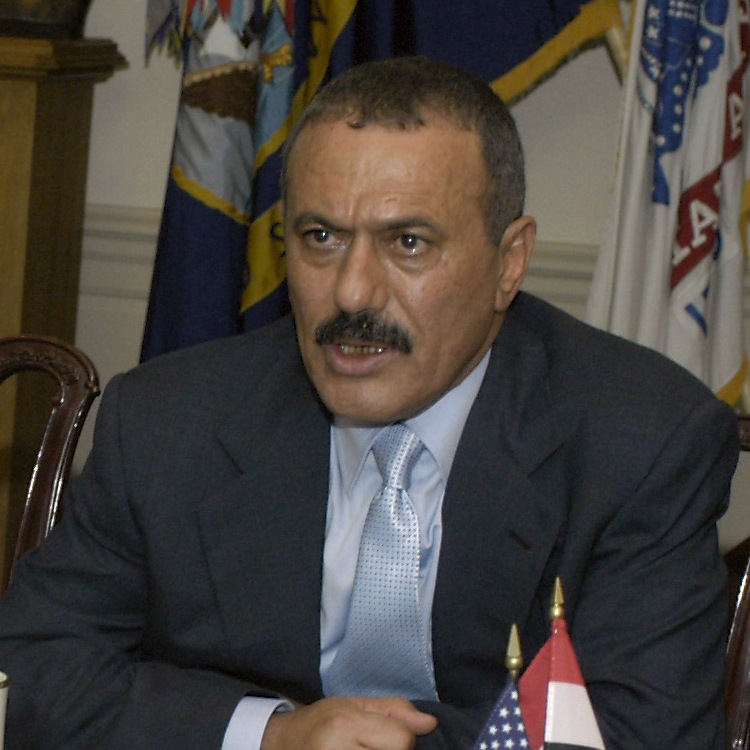
Ali Abdullah Saleh had been President of Yemen from 1990 to 2012, and President of North Yemen from 1978 to 1990

In 2010, Yemen had the fourth lowest Human Development Index rating in the Arab world after Sudan, Djibouti and Mauritania.

It was also facing a conflict with al-Qaeda in the Arabian Peninsula, as well as a revolt from South Yemen secessionists, who wanted to see the old South Yemen reconstituted. In addition, there was a Shia rebellion by Zaidi rebels, known as the Houthis. In the years leading up to the revolution Yemen also faced large-scale civil unrest, including protests in July 2005 over fuel price hikes which led to the deaths of 36 people.

Before his ouster, Ali Abdullah Saleh had been president of Yemen, and previously North Yemen, for 33 years. and many believed his son Ahmed Saleh was being groomed to eventually replace him. Almost half of the population of Yemen lives below the poverty line, and one-third suffer from chronic hunger. Yemen ranks 146th in the Transparency International 2010 Corruption Perceptions Index, and 8th in the 2012 Failed States Index (up two places from 2010).

A draft amendment to the constitution of Yemen was under discussion in parliament despite opposition protests. The amendment sought to allow Saleh to remain in the office of president for life. He urged the opposition to take part in an election on 27 April to avoid "political suicide."

The parliament's mandate was extended by two years after an agreement in February 2009 between the ruling General People's Congress and opposition parties seeking a dialogue on political reforms such as moving from a presidential system to a proportional representation parliamentary system and a more decentralised government. Neither measure was subsequently implemented.

== Timeline ==
=== Protests ===
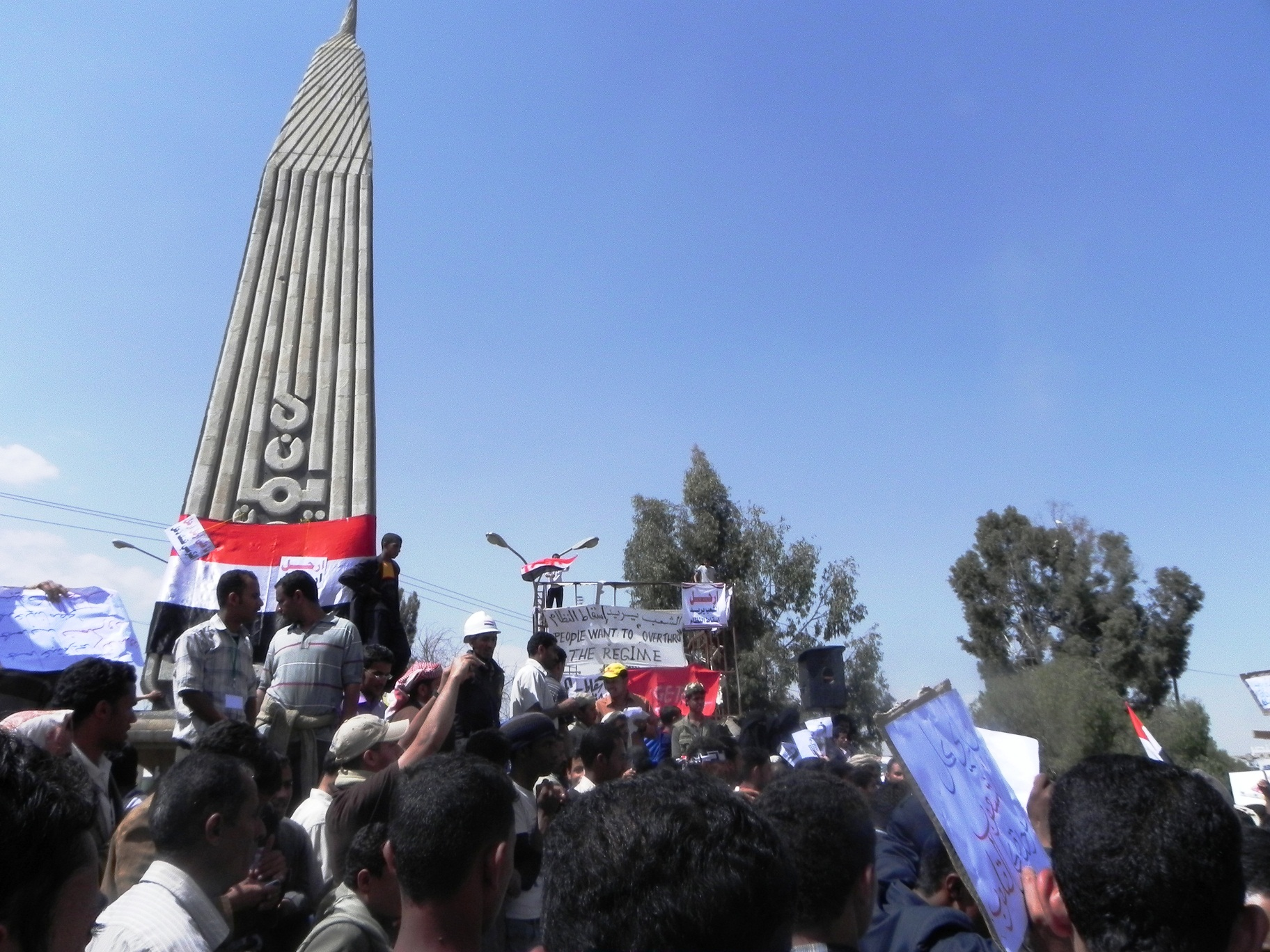
Some of the Yemeni protestors at Sanaa University demanding the dissolution of the current ruling party and calling on the president to resign.

Anti-Saleh protestors chanting Ash-shab yurid isqat an-nizam in Sanaa

External videos
- Raw Video: Yemeni Forces Open Fire on Protesters on YouTube

In January 2011, shortly after the popular ouster of the Tunisian government, major street protests materialized in Sanaa, the Yemeni capital, to demand governmental changes. Protests spread to the traditionally restive south, with particularly aggressive protests in cities like Aden and Taiz. Initially, demonstrators protested against a plan to amend the constitution and over the country's sluggish economy and high jobless rates. However, protests grew larger by late January and took on an increasingly pointed tone of criticism toward President Ali Abdullah Saleh, with many demonstrators beginning to call openly for new leadership in Yemen, including at least 10,000 at Sanaa University.

By February, opposition leader Tawakel Karman called for a "Day of Rage" in the mold of mass nationwide demonstrations that helped to topple the government of Tunisia and put pressure on the government of President Hosni Mubarak in Egypt. The protest drew more than 20,000 participants, as well as a show of force from Saleh's supporters. Security forces responded to protests in Aden with live ammunition and tear gas. After Mubarak quit power in Egypt, demonstrators celebrating the revolution and calling for a similar uprising in Yemen were attacked by police and pro-Saleh tribesmen. Clerics called for a national unity government and elections to be held in six months in an effort to quell violence and place members of the opposition in government. Later in the month, deaths were reported in Taiz and Aden after security forces attacked protesters with lethal force. By the end of February, several major tribes in Yemen had joined the anti-government protests and protests swelled in size to well over 100,000 on several days. Saleh also called for a national unity government, but opposition leaders rejected the proposal and called for Saleh to step down immediately.

In March, opposition groups presented a proposal that would see Saleh leave power peacefully, but Saleh refused to accept it. A number of prominent Yemeni government officials resigned over the violence used to disperse protests. On 18 March 45 protestors were shot dead in Sanaa, an incident that prompted the declaration of a state of emergency and international condemnation. Several days later, Saleh indicated that he would be willing to leave power by the end of the year or even sooner, but he later affirmed that he would not step down. By the end of March, six of Yemen's 18 governorates were out of the government's control, officials said.

=== Mediation attempts ===
In April, the Gulf Co-operation Council attempted to mediate an end to the crisis, drafting several proposals for a transition of power. Toward the end of the month, Saleh signaled he would accept a plan that would see him leave power one month after signing and provided for a national unity government in the lead-up to elections. By the end of the month, though, Saleh reversed course and the government announced he would not sign it, putting the GCC initiative on hold.

In early May, officials again indicated that Saleh would sign the GCC deal, and the opposition agreed to sign as well if Saleh signed it personally in his capacity as president. However, Saleh again backed away, saying the deal did not require his signature, and the opposition followed suit, accusing Saleh of negotiating in bad faith. Protests and violence across the country intensified in the wake of this second reversal by Saleh.

In late May, opposition leaders received assurances that Saleh would sign the GCC plan after all, and they signed the deal the day before the president was scheduled to ink it as well. Saleh however once again decided not to sign, and a brief but tense standoff occurred on 22 May when Saleh's supporters surrounded the embassy building of the United Arab Emirates in Sanaa, trapping international diplomats (including the secretary-general of the GCC) inside until the government dispatched a helicopter to ferry them to the presidential palace.

=== Uprising ===
Territory and areas of influence for rebels (blue) and Islamists (red) in Yemen's uprising, as of 23 October 2011.

On 23 May, a day after Saleh refused to sign the transition agreement, Sheikh Sadiq al-Ahmar, the head of the Hashid tribal federation, one of the most powerful tribes in the country, declared support for the opposition and his armed supporters came into conflict with loyalist security forces in the capital Sanaa after Saleh ordered al-Ahmar's arrest. Heavy street fighting ensued, which included artillery and mortar shelling. The militiamen had surrounded and blocked off several government buildings in the capital and people on the ground were reporting that it looked like the situation was deteriorating into a civil war.

As the situation in Sanaa was developing, about 300 Islamist militants attacked and captured the coastal city of Zinjibar (population 20,000) (see Battle of Zinjibar). During the takeover of the town, the militants killed seven soldiers, including a colonel, and one civilian. Two more soldiers were killed in clashes with militants in Lawdar.

On day three of the fighting, military units that defected to the opposition were hit for the first time by mortar fire killing three soldiers and wounding 10. By the evening, it was reported that tribesmen took control of the Interior Ministry building, SABA state news agency, and the national airline building.

A ceasefire was announced late on 27 May, by al-Ahmar, and the next day, a truce was established.

Opposition demonstrators had occupied the main square of Taiz since the start of the uprising against the rule of president Saleh. The protests were for the most part peaceful. However, that changed on 29 May, when the military started an operation to crush the protests and clear the demonstrators from their camp at the square. Troops reportedly fired live ammunition and from water cannons on the protesters, burned their tents and bulldozers ran over some of them. The opposition described the event as a massacre. (see 2011 Battle of Taiz)

However, by 31 May, the ceasefire had broken down and street fighting continued in Sanaa. Tribesmen had taken control of both the headquarters of the ruling General People's Congress (Yemen) and the main offices of the water utility.

On 1 June, units of the loyalist Presidential Guard, commanded by one of Saleh's sons, shelled the headquarters of an army brigade belonging to the defected 1st Armored Division, even though the defected military units were holding a neutral position in the conflict between the loyalists and the tribesmen. The worst of the fighting was in the northern Hassaba neighborhood, where tribal fighters seized a number of government ministries and buildings. Government artillery fire heavily damaged the house of al-Ahmar and the government cut the area's electricity and water supplies. The government units, led by one of Saleh's sons, and loyalist special forces attacked but failed to recapture the Hassaba administrative building. Tribal fighters also seized the office of the General Prosecutor in the city's northwest. They were backed up by two armored vehicles from the 1st Armored Division. The Interior Ministry stated that the tribesmen had also captured a five-story building in the pro-Saleh Hadda neighborhood. During the 24 hours since the breakdown of the ceasefire, 47 people were killed on both sides during the heavy street fighting, including 15 tribesmen and 14 soldiers.

=== Presidential Palace assassination attempt ===
On 3 June, a bombing at the presidential palace left Saleh injured and seven other top government officials wounded. Saleh, the prime minister, the deputy prime minister, the parliament chief, the governor of Sanaa and a presidential aide were wounded while they were praying at a mosque inside the palace compound. Saleh was initially said to be injured in the neck and treated on the scene; later reports indicated his wounds were far more severe – including a collapsed lung and burns over 40% of his body. Four presidential guards and Sheikh Ali Mohsen al-Matari, an imam at the mosque, were killed.

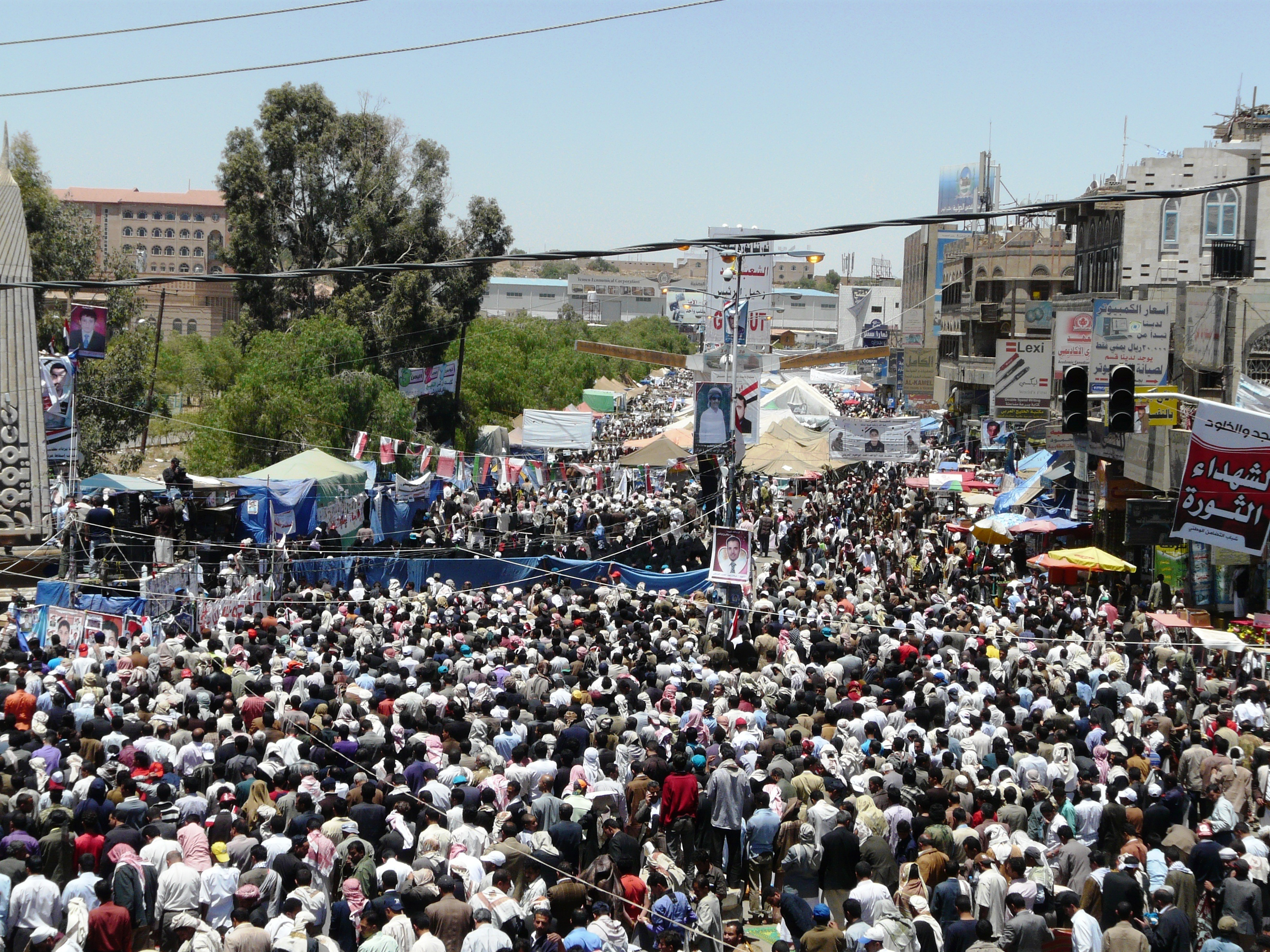
Protesters in Sanaa

As Saleh flew to the Saudi capital of Riyadh for surgery on 4 June, a cease-fire was brokered by Saudi Arabia's King Abdullah. Vice President Abdrabbuh Mansur al-Hadi took over as acting president and supreme commander of the Armed Forces. Despite the ceasefire, sporadic violence continued in the capital. Saleh's powerful sons also remained in Yemen instead of traveling to Saudi Arabia with their father.

On 6 July the government rejected the opposition's demands, including the formation of a transitional council with the goal of formally transferring power from the current administration to a caretaker government intended to oversee Yemen's first-ever democratic election. In response, factions of the opposition announced the formation of their own 17-member transitional council on 16 July, though the Joint Meeting Parties that functioned as an umbrella for many of the Yemeni opposition groups during the uprising said the council did not represent them and did not match their "plan" for the country.

On 6 August Saleh left the hospital in Saudi Arabia, but he did not return to Yemen.

On 18 September troops loyal to president Saleh opened fire on protesters in Sanaa, killing at least 26 people and injuring hundreds. Witnesses said security forces and armed civilians opened fire on protesters who left Change Square, where they had camped since February demanding regime change, and marched towards the city centre. Earlier on that day, government troops fired mortars into Al-Hasaba district in Sanaa, home to opposition tribal chief Sheik Sadeq al-Ahmar who claimed his fighters did not return fire after they were shelled by the Republican Guard.

On 19 September snipers in nearby buildings again opened fire on Monday at peaceful demonstrators and passers-by in the capital's Change Square, killing at least 28 people and wounded more than 100. Additional deaths were reported in the southwestern city of Taiz, where two people were killed and 10 were injured by gunfire from Saleh loyalists. Abdu al-Janadi, Yemen's deputy information minister, rejected accusations that the government had planned attacks on the protesters, and accused what he described as "unknown assailants" of carrying out the acts. On 19 September protesters and ex-soldiers stormed a base of the elite Republican Guards, who are loyal to the president. Reports said not a single shot was fired as the Guards fled the base, leaving their weapons behind.

On 22 September fighting broke out between Republican Guard troops commanded by Saleh's son Ahmed, and dissidents loyal to General Ali Mohsen al-Ahmar. Fighting which had been concentrated since 18 September in the city centre and at Change Square spread on to Sanaa's Al-Hasaba district, where gunmen loyal to powerful dissident tribal chief Sheikh Sadiq al-Ahmar traded fire with followers of Saghir bin Aziz, a tribesman loyal to Saleh.

=== Return of Ali Abdullah Saleh ===
On 23 September, Yemeni state-television announced that Saleh had returned to the country after three months amid increasing turmoil in a week that saw increased gun battles on the streets of Sanaa and more than 100 deaths.

As of 1 October 2011, Human Rights Watch was able to confirm 225 deaths and over 1000 wounded, many from firearms, since the Arab Spring protests began in Yemen. According to the Committee to Protect Journalists, photojournalist Jamal al-Sharaabi from Al-Masdar was the first press fatality of the Yemeni uprising and killed while covering a nonviolent demonstration at the Sanaa University 18 March 2011, but Reporters Without Borders reported that Mohamed Yahia Al-Malayia, a reporter from Al-Salam, was shot at Change Square on the same day but died later. Camera operator Hassan al-Wadhaf captured his own death on camera while assigned a protest in Sanaa on 24 September 2011.

On 7 October, the Nobel Committee announced that protest leader Tawakel Karman would share the Nobel Peace Prize with Liberian President Ellen Johnson Sirleaf and Liberian activist Leymah Gbowee. Karman was the first Yemeni citizen and first Arab woman to win a Nobel Prize.

On 4 December 2017, Ali Abdullah Saleh was killed by Houthi militia in Yemen following days of conflict. His nephew, Tarek Saleh, was thought to have been killed the following day as the fighting between Saleh soldiers and Houthis continued. A few weeks later Tarek Saleh appeared in Aden with various stories about his escape including using women's clothing

=== Power-transfer deal ===
On 23 November 2011, Saleh flew to Riyadh in Saudi Arabia to sign the Gulf Co-operation Council plan for political transition, which he had previously spurned. Upon signing the document, he agreed to legally transfer the powers of the presidency to his deputy, Vice President Abdrabbuh Mansur Hadi within 30 days and formally step down by the presidential elections on 21 February 2012, in exchange of immunity from prosecution for him and his family.

On 21 January 2012, the Assembly of Representatives of Yemen approved the immunity law. It also nominated Vice President Hadi as its candidate for the upcoming presidential election. Saleh left Yemen on the next day to seek medical treatment in the United States, and is reportedly seeking exile in Oman.

A presidential election was held in Yemen on 21 February 2012. With a report claims that it has 65 percent of its turnout, Hadi won 99.8% of the vote. Abd Rabbuh Mansur al-Hadi took the oath of office in Yemen's parliament on 25 February 2012. Saleh returned home on the same day, but did not attend Hadi's swearing-in ceremony. Two days later, Saleh resigned from the presidency on 27 February 2012 and formally transferred power to his successor, marking the end of his 33-year rule. As part of the agreement, al-Hadi would have overseen the drafting of a new constitution and serve only two years, until new parliamentary and presidential elections were to be held in 2014.

== Domestic responses ==
On 27 January, Yemeni Interior Minister Mutaher al-Masri said that "Yemen is not like Tunisia."

On 2 February, President Ali Abdullah Saleh said that he would freeze the constitutional amendment process under way. He also vowed not to pass on the reins of power to his son: "No extension, no inheritance, no resetting the clock;" and that he would quit in 2013. He also called for national unity government. He further promised direct elections of provincial governors and to re-open voter registration for the April election after complaints that about 1.5 million Yemenis could not sign on to the voter rolls. On 1 March, Saleh blamed the United States and Israel over the conflict.

On 10 March, he announced a referendum on moving to a parliamentary system of government would be held later in the year. A spokesperson for the anti-government protesters said this was "too little, too late." He said a new constitution would guarantee the separation of legislative and executive powers and prepare for a new election. On 20 March, Saleh fired the cabinet, Saleh fired all members of his Cabinet of Yemen on the same day including Prime Minister Ali Muhammad Mujawar and vice-Prime Ministers Rashad al-Alimi, Abdul-Karim Al-Ar'haby and Sadiq Amin Abu-Rass. but asked them to remain in a caretaker role until he forms a new one.

The leader of the Yemeni Congregation for Reform (Islah), the largest opposition party in Yemen, Mohammed al-Sabry, stated, "We want constitutional amendments but we want amendments that don't lead to the continuance of the ruler and the inheritance of power to his children." He also doubted Saleh's pledge not to seek re-election. Al-Sabry said Saleh made a promise in 2006 not to run, but then failed to fulfill his pledge.

On 23 March, Saleh, in a letter passed to opposition groups, offered to hold a referendum on a new constitution, then a parliamentary election, followed by a presidential poll before the end of 2011. The opposition groups said they were studying the offer.

On 24 March, Saleh issued a statement that he "has accepted the five points submitted by the JMP, including formation of a government of national unity and a national committee to draft a new constitution, drafting a new electoral law, and holding a constitutional referendum, parliamentary elections and a presidential vote by the end of the year although it was later reported that negotiations between Saleh and the opposition had stalled.

On 30 March, at a meeting with Mohammed al-Yadoumi, head of the Islah party, Yemen's president made a new offer, proposing he stays in office until elections are held at the end of the year but transferring his powers to a caretaker government, with a prime-minister appointed by the opposition. The opposition promptly rejected the offer, with a spokesman calling it "an attempt to prolong the survival of regime".

=== Resignations from the ruling party and government ===
- Head of the ruling party's foreign affairs committee and the Advisor to the Prime Minister, H.E Dr. Mohammed Abdul Majeed Qubaty
- Head of the finance committee of parliament Fathi Tawfiq Abdulrahim
- Deputy Minister of Culture Sam Yahya Al-Ahmar
- Deputy Minister of Youth and Sport Hashid Abdullah al-Ahmar
- MP Ali Al-Imrani, from Al Bayda Governorate
- Businessman Nabil Al-Khameri
- Minister of Tourism Nabil Hasan al-Faqih, from his post and the ruling party
- Minister of Culture and Yemeni Shura Council member Abdulwahab al-Rawhani, from the ministry and council
- Ambassador to Russia Dr. Mohammed Saleh Ahmed Al-Helali
- Party's central committee member Jalal Faqira who also heads the political science department at Sanaa University
- Assistant Secretary General of the Cabinet Mohammad Sewar
- Head of the state news agency and a ruling party member Nasr Taha Mustafa
- Ambassador to Lebanon Faisal Amin Abu-Rass
- Mohamed Saleh Qara'a, a prominent member of the ruling party
- Human Rights Ministry (Yemen) Huda al-Baan, from her post and the ruling party
- Undersecretary at the Human Rights Ministry Ali Taysir
- Representative to the Arab League Abdel-Malik Mansour
- Ambassador to Algeria Jamal Awadh Nasser (denied by the government)
- Ambassador to Belgium Abdul-Wali al-Shameri
- Ambassador to China Marwan Abdullah Abdulwahab Noman (denied by the government)
- Ambassador to Czech Republic Salem Yahya Alkharejah
- Ambassador to Egypt Abdul-Wali al-Shameri
- Ambassador to Indonesia Abdulwahed Mohamed Fara
- Ambassador to Iraq Abdul-Wali al-Shameri
- Ambassador to Jordan Shaea Muhssin
- Ambassador to Kuwait Dr. Khaled Sheikh
- Ambassador to Oman Ahmad Daifallah Al-Azeib
- Ambassador to Pakistan Abdu Ali Abdul Rahman
- Ambassador to Saudi Arabia Mohammed Ali al-Ahwal
- Ambassador to Spain Salim Yahya al-Kharega; (denied by the government)
- Ambassador to Syria Abdel-Wahhab Tawaf
- Ambassador to Qatar Yahya Hussain Al-Aarashi
- Ambassador to the United Nations Abdullah al-Saidi
- Chargé d'affaires to Tunisia Minister Plenipotiary Ahmed Abdullah Naji
- Major General Ali Mohsen al-Ahmar (Ali Mohsen Saleh), head of the North Western Military Zone, and three of his brigadiers:
  - General Abdullah Ali Alewa, adviser of the Yemeni supreme leader of the army
  - Brigadier Mohammed Ali Mohsen, head of the Eastern Division
  - Brigadier Hameed Al-Qushaibi, head of brigade 310 in Omran area
  - Brigadier Nasser Eljahori, head of brigade 121
- 60 military officers and 50 police personnel of the Hadhramaut Governorate
- Abdallah al-Qahdi, a senior military general from Aden

=== Arrests and repression ===
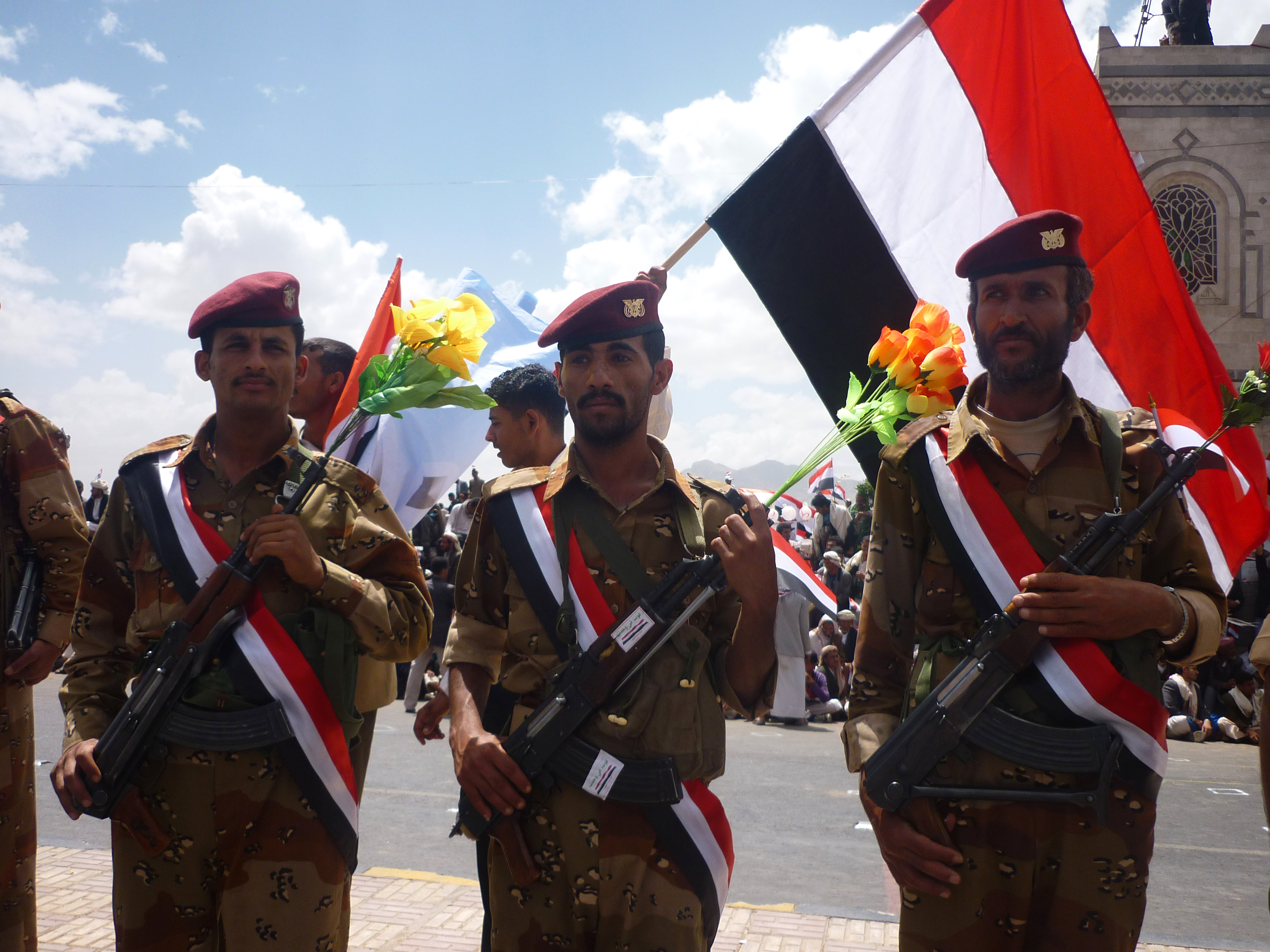
Yemeni soldiers from the 1st Armoured Division on 60th Street in Sanaa, 22 May 2011

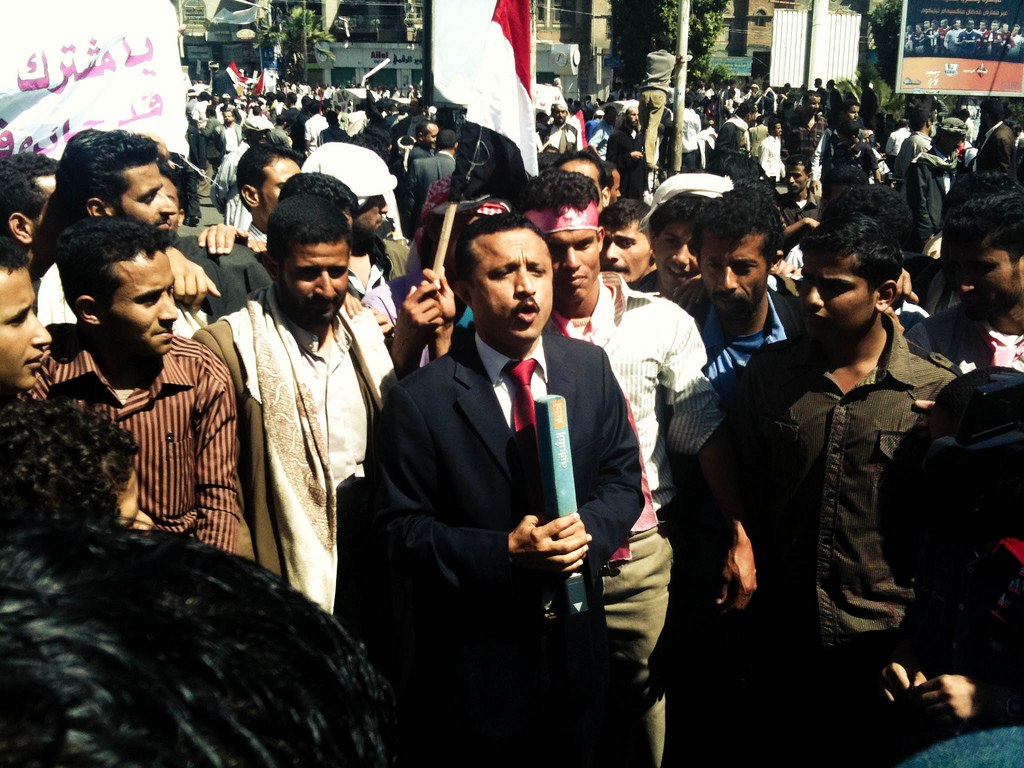
A television reporter in the middle of protesters in Sanaa

On 23 January, Tawakel Karman was detained and charged with "'inciting disorder and chaos' and organising unauthorised demonstrations and marches". Karman was a leader of two student rallies in Sanaa and called for the overthrow of Saleh's regime. Her husband said her whereabouts were not known. Several hundred students protested outside Sanaa University demanding her release. Thousands of people protested against the arrest of Karman and other protestors by a sit-in outside of the prosecutor's office. She was freed 30 hours after her arrest on parole, with the condition not to violate "public order and the law". Karman returned to participating in demonstrations hours after her release.

On 14 March, security forces raided an apartment shared by four Western journalists and deported them. Reporters Without Borders condemned the action and noted that two other foreign journalists were also deported two days earlier. The Committee to Protect Journalists also condemned the expulsions. They also said that two Yemeni journalists informed them that a group of twenty people, believed to be government supporters, went to the Yemeni Journalists' Syndicate in Sanaa day earlier and threatened to burn it down. They further said that Yemeni journalists are facing increasing harassment.

== International reactions ==
The Yemeni government's response to protests prompted a backlash even from traditional allies like the United States and Saudi Arabia. A number of national governments have called on President Saleh to resign, and the Gulf Co-operation Council introduced an initiative calling upon Saleh to relinquish power in favor of a new, democratically elected government. The Obama administration, however, supported "a transitional framework that preserved privileges for established political and military elements of the old regime, rather than respond to the groundswell of genuine support—no, demand—for political pluralism and a civil state."

On 7 October 2011, Tawakul Karman was awarded the Nobel Peace Prize for her visible role as a woman in the Arab Spring movement and as a human right activist in Yemen. She shared the Prize with Liberian President Ellen Johnson Sirleaf and Liberian peace activist Leymah Gbowee. Before their prizes were awarded, only 12 other women had ever been granted the award.

== Analysis ==
=== Use of pink ===
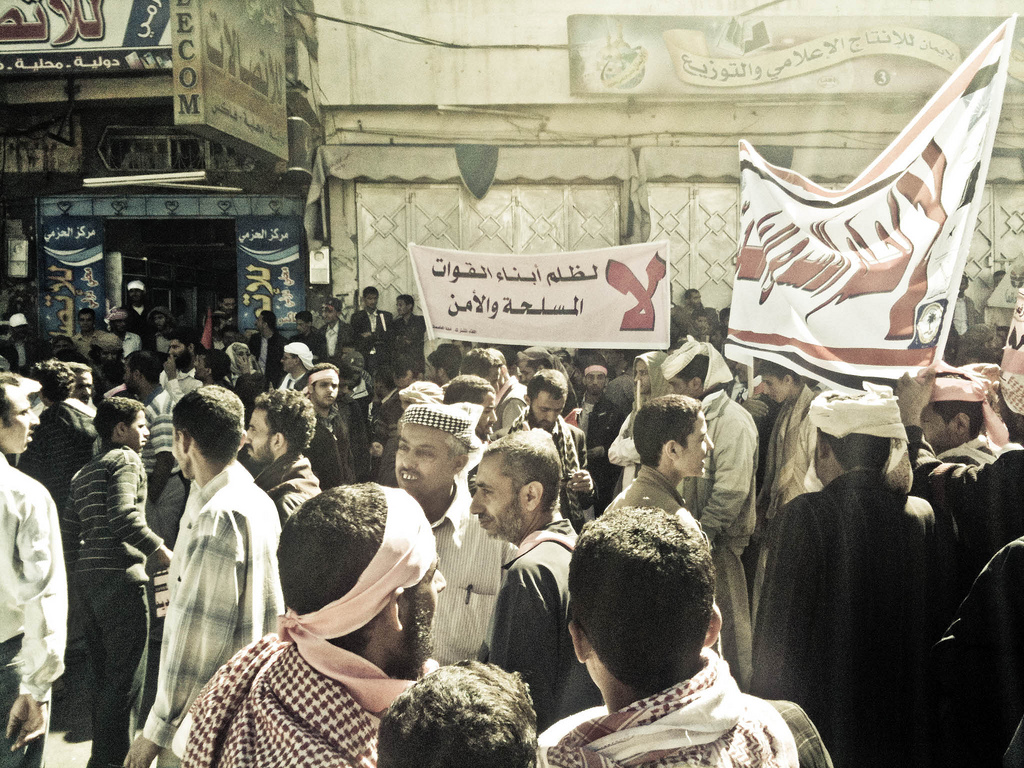
Protesters with pink signs and headwear

Yemeni protesters wore pink ribbons to symbolise the "Jasmine Revolution" and indicate their non-violent intent. Shawki al-Qadi, a lawmaker and opposition figure, said pink was chosen to represent love and to signal that the protests would be peaceful. The preponderance of pink ribbons in the demonstrations showed the level of planning that went into the protests.

=== Opposition factions ===
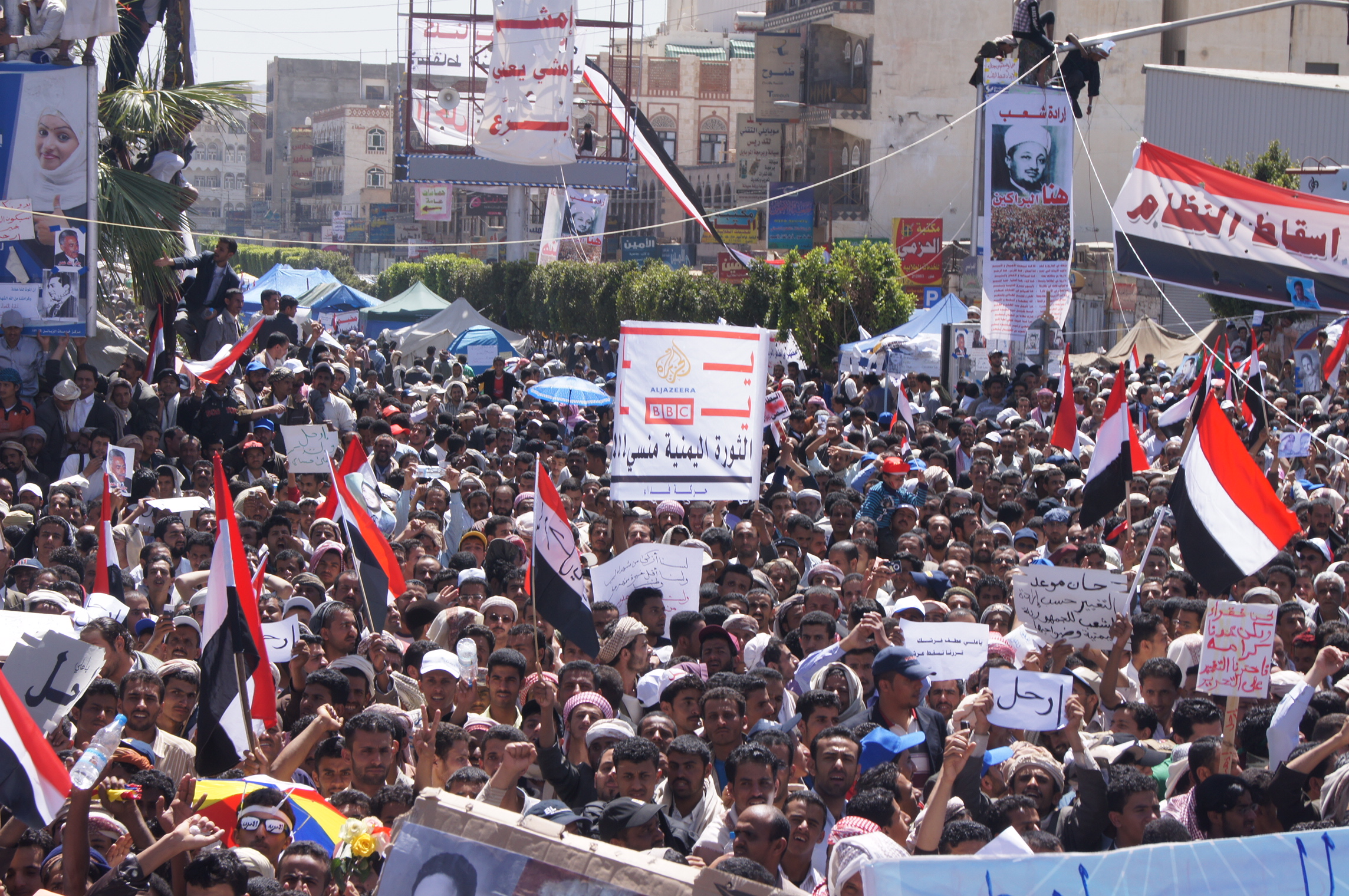
Tens of thousands of protesters marching to Sanaa University, joined for the first time by opposition parties

According to Al Jazeera, the deeply fractured opposition includes the Joint Meeting Parties (JMP; formed in 2002), Islah (also known as Yemeni Congregation for Reform and the major member of JMP), the al-Ahmar family, and various insurrection groups including the Houthis in the north and the South Yemen Movement in the south. These groups include socialist, Islamist and tribal elements with differing goals. Islah, which currently holds about twenty per cent of the seats in the legislature, includes some members of the Ahmar family, Yemen's Muslim Brotherhood, and Salafi preacher Abdul Majid al-Zindani, labeled a "specially designated global terrorist" by the US. The JMP also includes the Yemeni Socialist Party (YSP), Al-Haq, the Unionist party, and the Popular Forces Union party. The al-Ahmar sons – Sadek al-Ahmar and Hamid al-Ahmar – whose late father was a former leader of the Hashid tribal confederation, want power. The Southern Movement has temporarily dropped its calls for secession with calls for Saleh's ouster.

Yemeni human-rights activists and students disagree with political parties regarding tactics for political change in Yemen. Some political parties have called for reform to take place under President Saleh, while students and human rights activists have wished to "channel the momentum of the 2010–2011 uprisings in the region." In late January, a lawyer and human-rights activist involved in organising protests, Khaled al-Anesi, stated "There is a popular movement and a political movement in Yemen. But there is no support from the political parties for the popular movement, which is not organised. It is still weak and in the beginning stages."

On 21 March, the Financial Times reported that in the absence of obvious candidates for the presidency, the transition of power is likely to be controlled by those who made the pre-emptive strike against him: Hamid al-Ahmar of Islah and the JMP, radical cleric Abdul Majid al-Zindani, and Islamist-allied General Ali Mohsen al-Ahmar (also called Ali Mohsen Saleh).

==== Southern groups ====
Southern secessionist groups said they were holding three Yemeni soldiers kidnapped towards the end of January. On 2 February, clashes in the south also resulted in three injuries. A growing number of protesters in the north sees with interest the rise of the South Yemen Movement, maybe hoping that the southern secessionists may overthrow the government.

==== Al Qaeda ====
On 6 March, Al Qaeda in the Arabian Peninsula (AQAP) claimed responsibility for the shooting of five soldiers two separate attacks during the ongoing protests. Four of the soldiers were killed in Ma'rib Governorate when the perpetrators opened fire on a passing military vehicle. Two of the soldiers were part of the Republican Guard. The other death was that of an army colonel who was shot as he went shopping in Zinjibar, Abyan Governorate.

On 31 March 2011, AQAP declared an "Islamic Emirate" in the southern Abyan Governorate.

==== Joint Meeting Parties ====
On 2 March, six members of the JMP issued a five-point list of demands: right to demonstrate, investigations into violence, peaceful transition of government, time schedule within current year, and dialogue with those both inside and outside of Yemen.

On 4 April, the JMP issued a statement that any new regime, after Saleh's fall, would be a strong ally in the "War on Terror".

==== Alliance of Yemeni Tribes ====
A group of anti-government tribes, most prominently the Hashid tribal federation, declared the formation of the Alliance of Yemeni Tribes on 30 July. The Alliance is headed by Sheikh Sadiq al-Ahmar, the leader of the Hashid and a former ally of President Saleh, and is aligned with Yemen Army defectors under the leadership of General Ali Mohsen al-Ahmar. In its first declaration, it vowed solidarity with the protest movement and warned the government that any attack on protesters or areas under the control of the Yemeni opposition would be seen as attacks on the tribes.

On 13 March 2011, a coordination council of the Sanaa University protestors presented a list of seven demands, starting with the removal of Saleh and the creation of a temporary presidential council made up of representatives drawn from Yemen's four main political powers along with one appointed by the national security and military establishment. Many members of the Revolutionary Coalition of Youth for Peaceful Change (12 organizations) and the Organization of Liberal Yemeni Youth appear to be represented by this coordination council. On 17 March they sent a letter to US President Barack Obama, copying British PM David Cameron and EU President John Bruton, explaining their group, positions and proposals.

On 8 April 2011, the Civil Coalition of Youth Revolution (CCYR), a Yemen-based civil movement which includes 52 alliances of revolutionary youth activists around Yemen representing more than 10,000 members, released its Statute Draft including its "vision, revolution objectives, principles, duties, mechanisms and goals of the interim phase".

==== National Dialogue Conference ====
On 20 March, the National Dialogue Conference issued a position paper and list of demands. Their members are the JMP, independents, some General People's Congress members, and social figures including political, tribal and businessmen. It is headed by Mohammed Basindawa, an adviser to the president, and Sheik Hameed Al-Ahmer of Islah is its Secretary General.

==== Civil Bloc ====
On 24 March, the Civil Bloc, an umbrella group of civil society organisations, called for a transitional council of nine figures "not involved with the corruption of the old regime" to draw up a new constitution over a six-month period ahead of elections.

== See also ==
- Outline of the Yemeni crisis, revolution, and civil war (2011–present)
- 1962 coup d'état in Yemen
- Al-Qaeda in the Arabian Peninsula
- Democracy in the Middle East and North Africa
- Freedom in the World
- Yemeni civil war (1994)
- List of modern conflicts in the Middle East
- Poverty in Yemen
- Tawakkol Karman
- Houthi takeover in Yemen
- 2005 Yemeni uprising
