= List of Yemeni artists =

The following list of notable Yemeni artists (in alphabetical order by last name) includes artists of various genres, who are notable and are either born in Yemen, of Yemeni descent or who produce works that are primarily about Yemen.

== A ==
- Alia Ali (1985), multi-media artist
- Hashem Ali (1945–2009) painter
- Boushra Almutawakel (born 1969), photographer
- Amna Al-Nasiri (born 1970), plastic artist, art critic
- Shatha Altowai (born 1989), visual artist, painter

== E ==
- Alaa Al-Eryani, photographer, filmmaker, writer, and feminist activist

== F ==
- Fuad Al-Futaih (1948–2018), painter, graphic artist

== G ==
- Haider Galib (1958–1983), painter

== H ==
- Sabri Al-Haiki (born 1961), painter, poet, dramatic arts critic

== L ==
- Issa al-Laith (born 1985), zamil performer and poet

== J ==
- Saba Jallas, poet, cartoonist, and social media artist

== N ==
- Abdul Jabbar Numan (1949–2019) realist painter

== S ==
- Jamal al-Sharabi (c. 1976–2011), photojournalist
- Murad Subay (born 1987), street artist, stencil artist, political activist

== See also ==
- List of Yemenis
- Gargush
- Yemenite silversmithing
