= Palestine–Yemen relations =

- Palestine: Yemen

Palestine–Yemen relations are the bilateral relations between the State of Palestine and the Republic of Yemen.

== History ==
Since the 1970s, Yemen has experienced the influx of Palestinian groups in the education sector supported by scholarships. This happened during a period when Yemen was trying to establish stability following approximately ten years of conflict after the 1962 revolution. The influx of individuals occurred in a series of successive phases the most considerable of which were those who arrived subsequent to the Beirut siege of 1982. This particular contingent was primarily composed of individuals, along with their families, who joined the Palestinian militants. The arrival of further groups continued until the final group arrived in 2003 shortly after the American incursion into Iraq.

In 1990, Yemen officially unified into a single state, and the newly formed government continued to support Palestine. Yemen has consistently voted in favor of resolutions supporting Palestinian statehood at the United Nations, and has provided financial and political support to the Palestinians.

After the start of the Gaza war and genocide in 2023, Yemen consistently voted in favor of a humanitarian ceasefire.

The Houthis, an Islamist political and military organization in Yemen, began firing rockets at Israel and attacking ships in the Red Sea, claiming to facilitate humanitarian aid reaching the Gaza strip.The Houthis demanded a ceasefire and an end to the blockade of Gaza in order to end the attacks. The organization cites anti-Zionism and the occupation of Palestine as the reason for "Woe to the Jews" being a part of their controversial slogan, though they have been accused of harassing and attacking members of the country's remaining Jewish community, ordering them to "convert or leave Yemen," though the Houthis deny these claims. Houthis claim that under a reigning Houthi government, Jews in Yemen would have "nothing to fear." Yemenite Jews have migrated from Yemen to Palestine since the 19th century, though around 50,000 Yemenite Jews left for Israel after the establishment of the state in 1948 during Operation Magic Carpet. With Yemenite Jews, most of whom currently live in Israel, seeing the state as the only escape from poverty or persecution, it's unlikely for Yemenites to denounce Zionism and Israeli settler colonialism and return to Yemen without the country first being made into a safe place for Jews to reside under the ruling government.

=== Ancient links ===
Despite the lack of a specific geographical reference within the Quran, the encounter between Solomon and the Queen of Sheba is recorded in this religious text. Nonetheless, as per the insights of a subset of historians and experts, situated in contemporary Yemen, southern Arabia is conceivably the location of Sheba, governed under the authority of the Queen of Sheba. Likewise, it is commonly held that King Solomon presided over the governance of the ancient Israelite people in the land that currently occupies the territory of Palestine.
