= Mohamed al-Ghoom =

Yemeni musician

Mohamed Al-Ghoom
- محمد القحوم
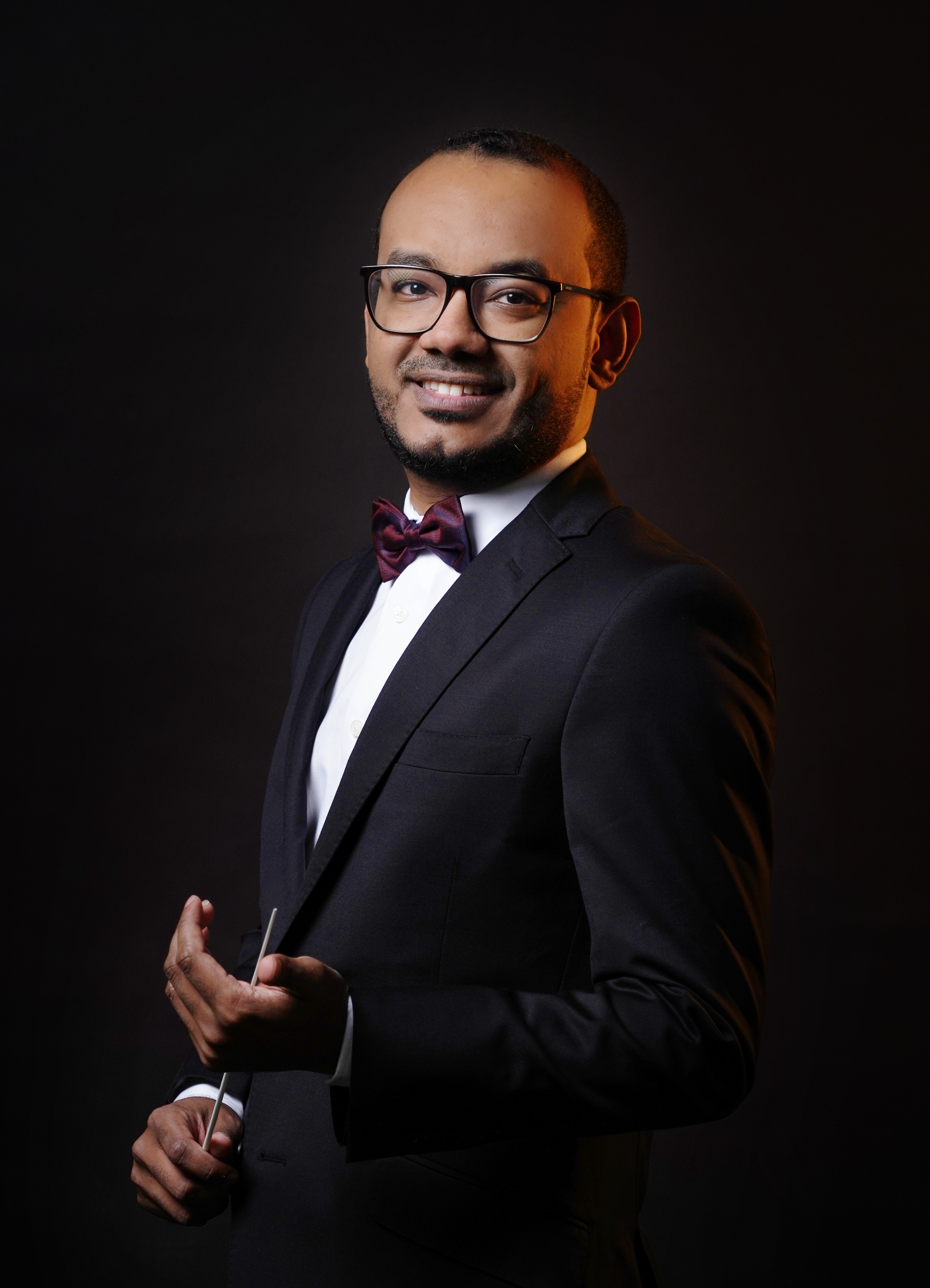
- Mohamed Al-Ghoom holding a baton
- Born: Mohamed Salem Al-Qahoom; 1991 (age 34–35); Tarim, Hadhramaut Governorate, Yemen
- Education: civil engineering (B.A), Hadhramout University
- Occupation: Music composer
- Years active: 2006–present
- Known for: Heritage Symphonies
- Website: www.hsymphonies.com

Mohamed Salem Al-Ghoom (Arabic: محمد سالم القحوم; born in 1991 (age 34–35)) is a Yemeni composer and maestro known for his efforts in preserving and promoting Yemeni musical heritage on an international scale. He is the founder of the Heritage Symphonies project, which combines traditional Yemeni music with orchestral styles to showcase the country's cultural heritage internationally.

He has organized and conducted concerts in various countries including Malaysia, Egypt, Saudi Arabia, Qatar, Kuwait and France. These performances highlight Yemeni traditional instruments and dances alongside classical orchestral music. Al-Ghoom aims to bring attention to Yemen's cultural richness and to inspire global audiences while preserving its traditions. Despite the challenges of Yemen's circumstances, Al-Ghoom has made a notable impact in the music scene.

== Early life ==
Al-Ghoom was born in the city of Tarim in Hadhramaut, Yemen.

== Musical career ==
In April 2019, Al-Ghoom presented his first international concert titled "Hope from the depth of pain" held in the Malaysian capital, Kuala Lumpur. Al-Ghoom led a musical band of 90 musicians, 30 of whom were from Hadhramaut, on traditional Hadrami musical and percussion instruments, while the rest were from China, India, Malaysia, Japan, and Uzbekistan.

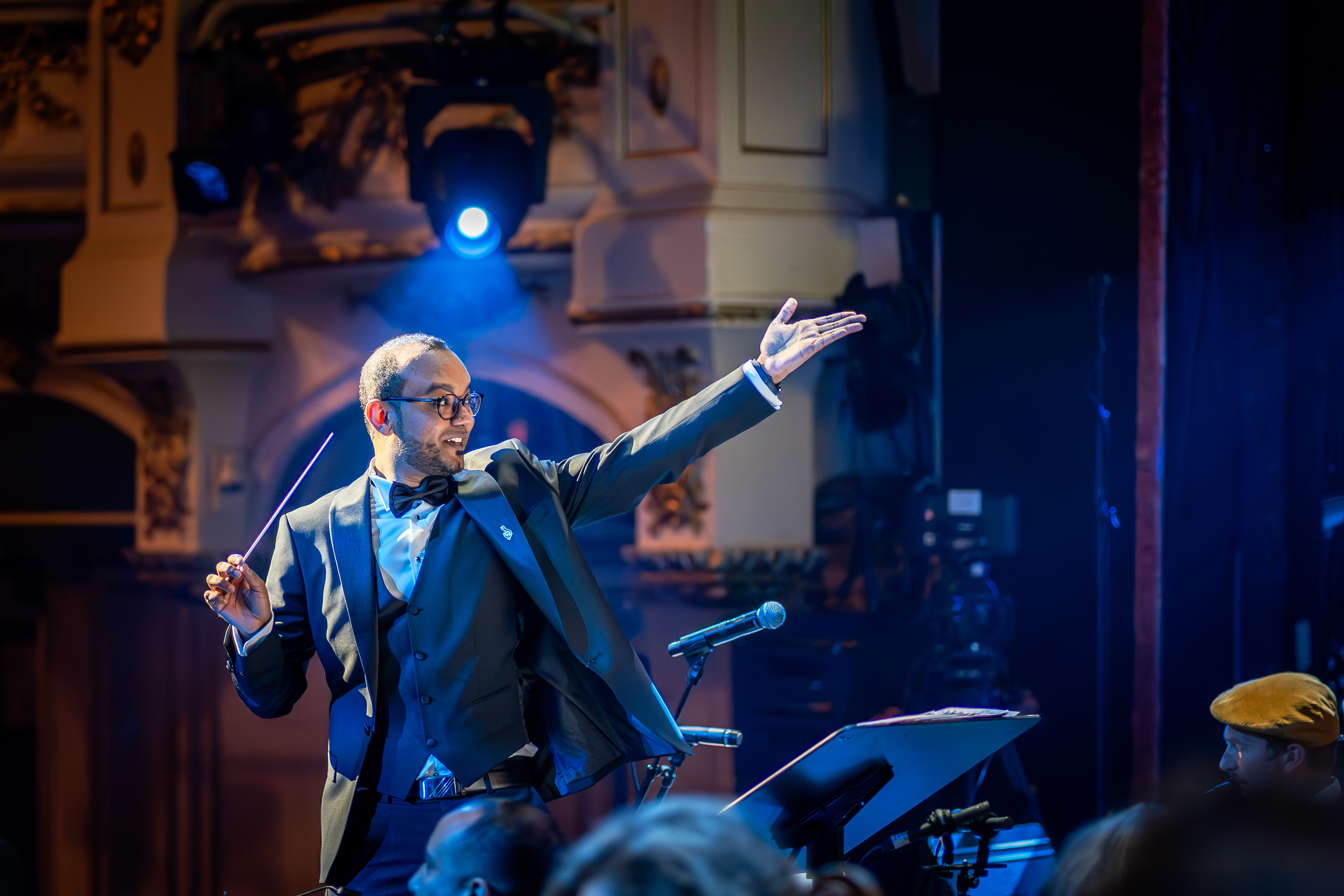
al-Gahoom performing in the Théâtre Mogador

On March 10, 2021, al-Ghoom led a second orchestral concert entitled "Yemeni melody on the banks of the Nile" in Cairo, presenting Yemeni and Egyptian musical genres.

In October 2023, a concert was held in Paris where Al-Ghoom performed in the Mogador Theatre with more than 1,500 live viewers. This event features 70 musicians, presenting pieces inspired by Yemeni heritage and classical music. The concert of 10 musical pieces was aimed "to transform the world's perception of Yemen through its rich musical tapestry". Each of the symphonies had its own story, for example, the first symphony entitled "El-Kasir" is a form of marine singing performed by Yemeni fishermen. The second, “War and Peace,” expresses a folk dance symbolizing war and reconciliation.

On 18 and 19 February 2024, the Hadhrami Orchestra held two evening concerts at the Sheikh Jaber Al-Ahmad Cultural Centre in Kuwait. These performances marked the inaugural event for the Heritage Symphonies project in the Gulf Cooperation Council.

On 20 May 2024, a concert titled "Yemeni Tunes in Doha" was held at the Opera House in Katara Cultural Village, Doha, Qatar. The event featured dozens of Yemeni musicians collaborating with the Qatar Philharmonic Orchestra and showcased 12 musical pieces.

On 19 November 2024, the "Yemeni Orchestra" was held at the King Fahad Cultural Centre in Riyadh, Saudi Arabia. The event was attended by Assistant Minister of Culture, Rakan Altouq and Yemen's Minister of Information, Culture and Tourism, Moammar Al Eryani.

== See also ==
- Heritage Symphonies
- Music of Yemen
- Saber Bamatraf
