= Amna Al-Nasiri =

Yemeni artist, author, and academic (b. 1970)

Amna Al-Nasiri آمنة النصيري
- Born: January 1, 1970 (age 56); Radda, Yemen Arab Republic (now Yemen)
- Education: Moscow Surikov State Academic Institute of Fine Arts and Peoples' Friendship University of Russia
- Years active: 1986–present
- Known for: art, authorship, and academia
- Children: 1
- Parent(s): Hila Atiq (mother); Ali Al-Nasiri (father)

Amna Al-Nasiri (Arabic: آمنة النصيري) (born 1970) is a Yemeni visual artist, art critic, and academic, she is regarded as a leading figure in the contemporary Yemeni and Arab art world. Amna is also a professor specialising in the Philosophy of Aesthetics at the College of Literature, Sanaa University, Yemen. She has held over 17 solo exhibitions in countries including Yemen, Germany, the Netherlands, Brazil, and Ireland. Al-Nasiri is also a writer, with three published books that explore themes of art and aesthetics.

== Early life and education ==
Amna Al-Nasiri was born in 1970 in Radda, Yemen Arab Republic (now Yemen). She grew up in a small family that included her mother, a sister, and two brothers. Her mother, Hila Atiq, was an exceptional woman for her time, she stood out in Radda for her literacy skills, which were uncommon among women in Yemen; particularly in rural areas like Radda. She was not only literate but also skilled in reading and drawing, qualities that played a pivotal role in shaping Al-Nasiri's early artistic education and fostering her passion for the arts.

In several interviews, Amna Al-Nasiri has recounted an anecdote from her second grade, where she failed an art assignment for deviating from the instructions. While her classmates were tasked with replicating a drawing of a tree, she chose to add her own creative touch by incorporating additional branches, which led to her failing the task.

Al-Nasiri’s mother, Hila, also displayed a strong commitment to her daughters' education. She filed a legal case against her husband in an effort to prevent him from restricting their educational opportunities. Although she lost the case, she moved with her children to Egypt, where they lived for four years. This experience had a profound impact on Al-Nasiri’s personal growth.

After returning to Yemen, Al-Nasiri completed her secondary education and began studying philosophy at Sanaa University. While nearing graduation with a degree in philosophy, she received a scholarship to study art, a field she was more passionate about but had found limited opportunities to pursue in Yemen. She travelled to Moscow, where she earned a master’s degree in Art History and Theory from the Moscow Surikov State Academic Institute of Fine Arts. Upon her return to Yemen in 1994, she joined the Aesthetic Science branch at Sanaa University.

In 1998, Al-Nasiri returned to Moscow to pursue a PhD at the Peoples' Friendship University of Russia. She completed her doctoral studies in 2001, earning a PhD in the Philosophy of Art. Following her return, she joined Sanaa University as a professor, contributing to the academic and artistic community.

== Career ==
Amna Al-Nasiri has held over 17 solo exhibitions in Yemen and internationally. Her critical writings on visual art have been featured in numerous local and Arab newspapers and magazines, and she has contributed regular columns to multiple Yemeni publications. She has authored three critical works on visual art and participated in various seminars, exhibitions, and workshops at local, regional, and international levels. Additionally, she has served as a jury member for several local and Arab art awards.

While still a student, Al-Nasiri held her first exhibition in 1985 at the Cultural Centre in Sana’a, featuring over 25 portraits of renowned writers and intellectuals from around the world.

After earning her master's degree in Moscow, Al-Nasiri returned to Yemen in 1994 and joined the Aesthetic Science branch at Sanaa University as an assistant professor.

Al-Nasiri's early works focused on women’s issues, particularly their fears and struggles, as explored in her debut exhibition after graduation, "Closed World." Over time, her focus shifted from gender-specific concerns to broader humanitarian themes, influenced by her philosophical studies, which she credits for broadening her artistic vision.

Following her PhD in Philosophy of Art in 2001, she became a professor at Sanaa University. In the same year, the Society of Russian Critics awarded Amna Al-Nasiri the Memorial Medal and granted her honorary membership in recognition of her contributions.

In 2009, Al-Nasiri founded and headed the Kawn Atelier Foundation for Culture and Visual Development, which ceased operations following the political unrest in Yemen in 2014. She also served as the editor-in-chief of the newspaper Tashkeel and played a key role in establishing the Contemporary Art Group, the Sana’a Atelier, and the Yemeni Fine Artists Syndicate. She is also a member of The International Association of Art (AIAP) and serves as the Secretary of the Yemeni International Cultural Circle.

=== Published works ===
- مقامات اللون (Maqamat Al-Lawn, translated as: Scales of Colour: Essays and Insights in Visual Art), (Ministry of Culture 2004),
- مواقيت لأحزان سبأ (Mawaqeet L'ahzan Saba, translated as: “Times for Sorrows of Sheba”) in collaboration with the poet Ahmed Al-Awadhi, (Ministry of Culture 2004),
- متوالية القديم والجديد (Matawalya AlQadeem wal-Jadeed, translated as: Matawalya (Old And New Sequence)) in collaboration with Dr. Omar Abdel Aziz, Department of Culture and Information, (Sharjah) 2003,

=== Notable exhibitions ===
- 2010 – Sieges (حصارات), held at the French Cultural Centre, Sana'a, Yemen.
- 2011 – Poetry and Painting (الشعر واللوحة), hosted at the Schwarzbach Gallery, Wuppertal, Germany.
- 2011 – Vision from Within (رؤية من الداخل), organised by the Dutch Embassy, Sana'a, Yemen.
- 2011 – Land of the Queen of Sheba (أرض ملكة سبأ), a collaborative exhibition with artists Mazhar Nazar, Abdullah Al-Amin, and Rangila Art, held in Dublin, Ireland.
- 2013 – Vision from Within (رؤية من الداخل), presented at the House of Culture, Sana'a, Yemen.
- 2014 – White (أبيض), exhibited at the Al-Saeed Foundation, Taiz, Yemen.

=== Research and articles ===
- 2021 – Changes in Artistic Discourse During and After the Arab Spring: Graffiti in Yemen as a Case Study (المتغير في الخطاب الفني أثناء وبعد الربيع العربي: فن الجرافيتي في اليمن أنموذجا), forthcoming publication.
- 2021 – The Artistic Journey of Ayad Al-Nimr: Exploring Vision Through Color (التشكيلي عياد النمر: رحلة الرؤية في مختبر اللون), forthcoming in a book featuring the artist’s work and career.
- 2020 – Art Between the Dominance of Technology and the Inevitability of Evolution (الفن بين سطوة التكنولوجيا وحتمية التطور), presented at the Fifth Arts Forum, Katara, Doha, Qatar.
- 2018 – Art Between the Values of Tolerance and the Discourse of Violence (الفن بين قيم التسامح وخطاب العنف), presented at the Fourth Arts Forum, Katara, Doha, Qatar.
- 2014 – Young Artists and the Challenges of Time (الفنانين الشباب وتحديات الزمن), presented at the International Parallel Symposium of the First Tunis International Biennial, Tunis, Tunisia.
- 2013 – Trajectories of Yemeni Visual Arts (مسارات التشكيل اليمني), presented at the Annual Symposium of Al-Arabi Magazine, Kuwait.
- 2012 – Art When It Masters Pain (الفن عندما يحترف الألم), presented at the Tolerance Symposium, House of Folklore, Sana'a, Yemen.
- 2010 – As If Their Death Is Yours: A Study on the Art of Naji Al-Ali (كأنك مقتلهم لا القتيل: دراسة في فن ناجي العلي), presented at the Naji Al-Ali Symposium, House of Folklore, Sana'a, Yemen.
- 2010 – The Image of the Letter in Contemporary Arab Art (صورة الحرف في التشكيل العربي المعاصر), presented at the Sharjah Forum for Calligraphy and Ornamentation, Sharjah, United Arab Emirates.
- 2009 – Vision Disparity: A Self-Made Artifact or a Search for Identity? (تفاوت الرؤية صنيعة ذاتية أم بحث في الهوية؟), presented at the International Symposium on Art and Power, Visual Arts Center, Doha, Qatar.
- 2008 – Art in the Equations of Conflict (الفن في معادلات الصراع), presented at the Parallel Symposium of the First Arab Arts Forum, Sana'a, Yemen.
- 2008 – Between Text Chaos and External Chaos (بين فوضى النص وفوضى الخارج), presented at the International Islamic Art Symposium, National Council for Culture, Arts, and Heritage, Doha, Qatar.
- 2008 – Yemeni Visual Arts: The Power of Traditional Culture and the Rebellion of the Text (المحترف التشكيلي اليمني: سلطة الثقافة التقليدية وتمرد النص), published by Casa Árabe (Arab House), Madrid, Spain.
- 2008 – The Image of Women in Arab Art Beyond Aesthetic Modeling (صورة المرأة في العربي خارج النمذجة الجمالية), presented at the International Symposium marking the 50th anniversary of Al-Arabi Magazine, Kuwait.
- 2007 – Qatari Visual Arts: Between Creative Aspirations and External Influences (المحترف التشكيلي القطري: بين رهانات الإبداع وشروط الخارج), presented at the Parallel Symposium, Qatar Society of Fine Arts, Doha, Qatar.
- 2006 – Arab Visual Arts: The Authority of the Machine or the Temptation of Experimentation? (التشكيل العربي: سلطة الآلة أم غواية التجريب؟), presented at the International Parallel Symposium of the Third Cairo Graphic Triennial, Cairo, Egypt.
- 2006 – Globalization of Violence in Art and Its Impact on Individuals and Society (عولمة العنف في الفنون وتأثيرها على الفرد والمجتمع), presented at the Sociology Department Symposium, Faculty of Arts, Sana'a University, Yemen.
- 2005 – Omani Visual Arts: Celebrating Heritage and Humanity in Modernist Texts (التشكيل العماني: احتفاء بالتراث والحياة الإنسانية في نصوص حداثية), published in Nizwa Magazine, Issue 12, July 2005.
- 2004 – One-Dimensional Vision (الرؤية من بعد واحد), presented at the International Symposium for Al-Arabi Magazine on The West Through Arab Eyes, Kuwait.
- 2004 – The Adventure of Hashim Ali: Experimentation in Colorful Spaces (مغامرة هاشم علي: التجريب في فضاءات ملونة), published in the book Hashem Ali, Ministry of Culture, 2004.
- 2003 – Social Determinants in the Discourse of Arab Female Artists (المحددات الاجتماعية في خطاب التشكيلية العربية), presented at the Arab Women Creators Conference, Cairo, Egypt.
- 1999 – Arab Art and Questions of Identity (الفن العربي وأسئلة الهوية), presented at the International Parallel Symposium of the Sharjah Biennial, Sharjah, United Arab Emirates.

== See also ==
- Murad Subay
- Shatha Altowai
- Hashem Ali
- Women in Yemen
