= Murad Subay =

Yemeni artist and activist

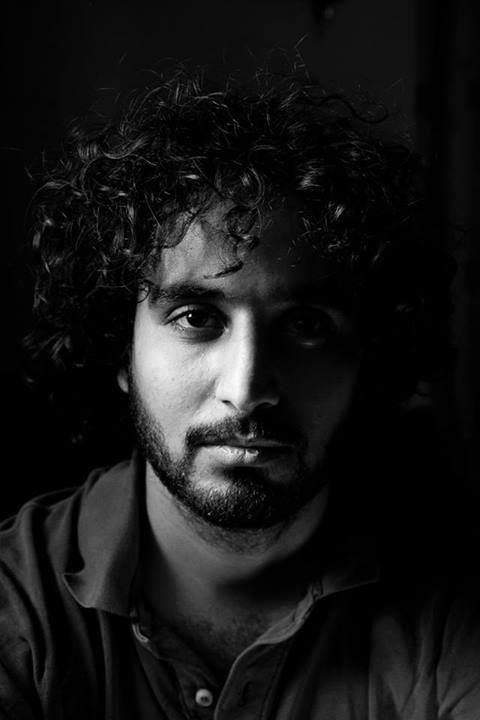
- Murad Subay, 2013
- Born: July 3, 1987 (age 38); Dhamar, Yemen
- Known for: Street art, painting, stencil
- Notable work: Color the Walls of Your Streets (2012); The Walls Remember Their Faces (2012); 12 Hours (2013); Ruins (2015)
- Awards: Freedom of Expression Award (2016); Art for Peace Award (2014)
- Website: https://muradsubay.com/

Murad Subay (born July 3, 1987, in Dhamar) is a Yemeni contemporary artist, street artist and a political activist. He has launched several street art campaigns of which society engagement marked one of their important elements. He first started to paint on the streets after the revolution of 2011, in a campaign he called "Color the Walls of Your Street".

He became widely known as an activist after launching several street art campaigns that criticized the political situation in his country and the conflicts which broke out in 2015 in Yemen. He always paints in the light of day and invites people to join him paint openly in the streets. People from different backgrounds and ages have joined him in his campaigns to express their own views around the political scene in Yemen. The influence of these campaigns spread to other cities such as Sana'a, Taiz, Aden, Ibb and Alhudaydah where similar campaigns were launched soon after. Subay has been compared to fellow street artist Banksy.

== Early life and education ==
Murad Subay was born in Dhamar, Yemen on July 3, 1987. He was raised there until the age of 6, before his family moved to live in the capital Sana'a. He lived in Sana'a with his mother and six siblings. Murad used to draw at school, but he only became interested in art in the age of 14 when he painted his first sketch and received encouragements from his family. He studied English literature from 2007 to 2011 at Sana'a University.

In the spring of 2011, specifically with the start of the peaceful Yemeni revolution, Murad was one of earliest to join the protestors in their demand of a just, civil state. He used to spend most of his time inside the change square, inspecting the entrants for weapons and joining the peaceful rallies. When the political parties seized control of the course of the revolution, he left the change square disappointed.

== The campaigns ==
=== Color The Walls of Your Streets ===
Subay drew his inspiration to launch his first campaign "Color the Walls of Your Street" from the damaged walls of the streets. He went down alone to the streets with his tools on March 15, 2012, to paint contemporary murals on the walls. He then posted a public invitation for people through his Facebook page to join him in painting openly. A week later, many people showed up to paint with him on March 22, 2012. He then invited people every Thursday morning to join him in painting murals openly, and often painted alone in other days.

This campaign lasted for three months of which artists, passers-by, elders, children, men, women and even soldiers painted alongside him in different areas in Sana'a city. The idea of this campaign spread between people and similar campaigns were launched soon after in other cities.

=== The Walls Remember Their Faces ===
Soon after finishing his first campaign, Subay launched his second campaign which marked the transition to political art. He called the campaign "The Walls Remember Their Faces" on September 8, 2012, to highlight the forcibly disappearance of political activists and journalists from the late 1960s and until 2011. He used stencil technique to paint the faces of the forcibly disappeared on the walls of the cities and invited their families and people in general to join him.

For seven months, Subay asked people on different media to supplement him with information around the forcibly disappeared. Many families responded to him and provided him with pictures, stories and sometimes belongings of the victims. They also joined in painting their disappeared relatives and friends and they held several protests during the campaign. Some of the consequences of this campaign were the creation of a special committee to investigate the cases of enforced disappearance, the discussion over the elaboration of a transitional justice law and the UN pressure on the Yemeni government to sign a convention against enforced disappearance.

Subay and his friends painted the pictures of 102 forcibly disappeared victims in many areas in the cities Sana'a, Taiz, Alhudayda and Ibb. Many of these murals were defaced by unidentified people; however, this act did not discourage Subay and his friends from making dozens of duplicates across the city.

=== 12 Hours ===
On July 4, 2013, Subay launched the third campaign "12 Hours" to discuss 12 political and social issues affecting the Yemeni society and led it off with a mural about spread of weapons. Fellow artists started to join him during the second activity of the campaign which was about sectarianism.

For a whole year, Subay and fellow artists painted murals about a certain subject each month in the streets of Sana'a city. The 12 topics they discussed were spread of weapons, sectarianism, kidnappings, tempering with homeland, US drones, poverty, civil war, terrorism, children recruitment, treason, corruption and an open topic in the 12th activity of the campaign.

Not long enough after "12 Hours" campaign ended, unknown actors vandalized some murals discussing different political issues by covering the original murals with white paint or slogans. The vandalized murals belonged to the tenth hour "treason" that mostly discussed USA, Saudi Arabia and Iran's influence and involvement in the mounting conflicts, and the eleventh hour "corruption" that discussed different forms of corruption in the country.

=== Dawn Sculptures ===
In early 2015, specifically on January 15, 2015, Subay launched a forth campaign that he called "Dawn Sculptures". He led it off with an installation about "Elmuqah", an ancient Yemeni symbol that represents the unity of Yemenis and their state 3000 years ago. Subay was meaning to continue working on this campaign, had it not for the power outages and lack of funding that forced him to postpone the activity.

=== Ruins ===
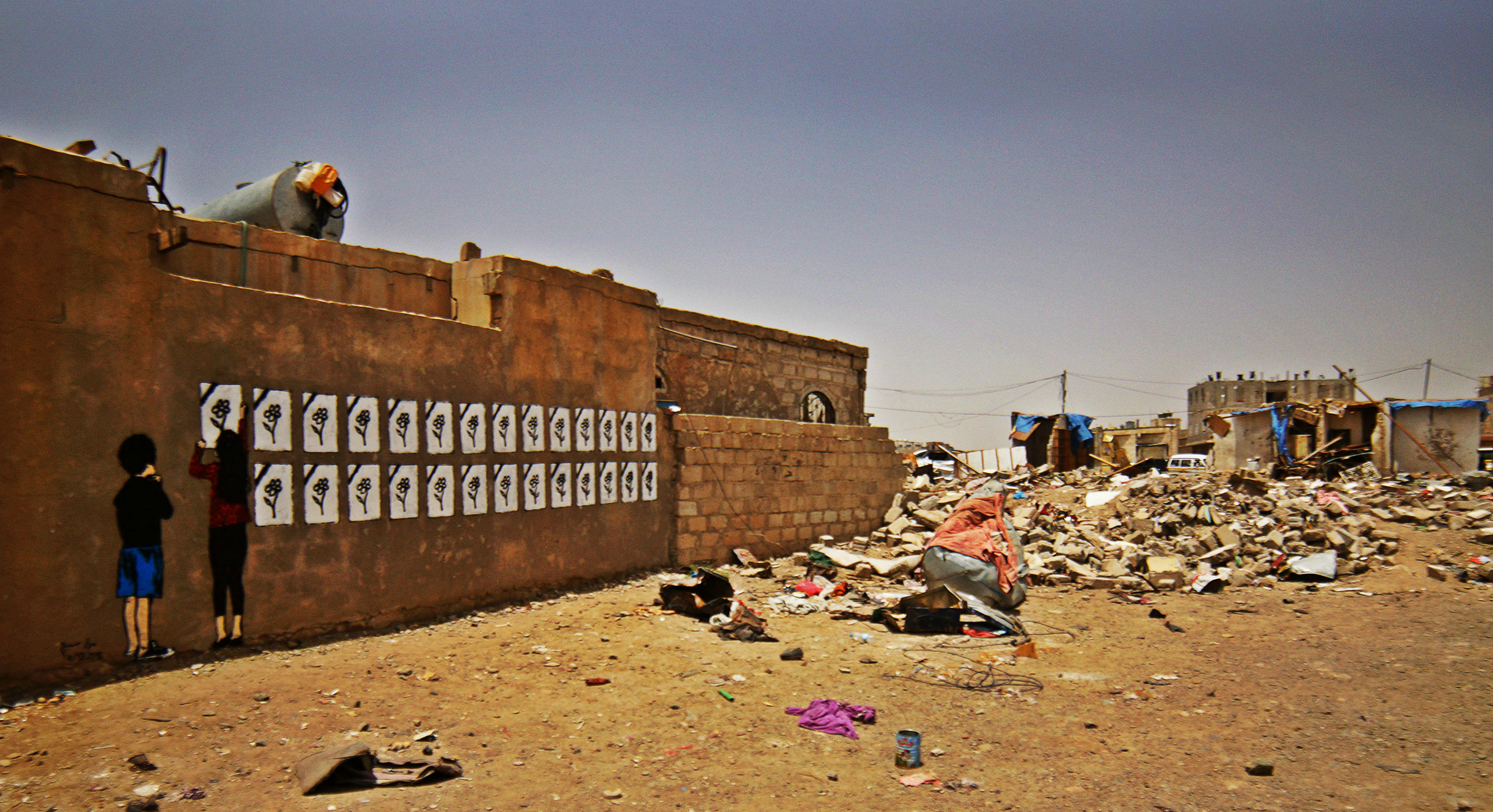
A mural by artist Murad Subay in the first activity of Ruins campaign, painted in Bani Hawat area, Sana'a, on May 18, 2015.

After the regional and internal conflicts broke out in Yemen in 2015, Subay launched the fifth campaign "Ruins" on May 18, 2015, to commemorate the victims of the conflicts and to highlight the catastrophic situation of the country. He often paints in the areas ruined due to the conflicts. Subay painted his first mural in the campaign in an area called "Bani Hawat" located in the suburbs of Sana'a, where an airstrike killed almost 27 civilians, including 15 children.

His friends began to join him during the second activity of the campaign, in an area called "Faj Attan", a heavily populated area inside the capital Sana'a where a heavy air strike on a weapons storage facility nearby left behind tens of killed and injured civilians and destroyed the homes of hundreds of people.

In the third activity of the campaign, he painted a mural in Taiz city, a city that is witnessing a great losses due to the internal and regional conflicts in Yemen. He painted the mural in the outer parts of the city because he was banned to go further inside the city by one of the conflict parties.

For The fourth activity of this campaign, he was planning to paint mural in Aden city, another city torn by the internal and regional conflicts in Yemen. However, because of the dangerous security situation, he could not travel there, so he and his friends painted their murals in Sawan area in Sana'a, yet another area that was targeted by an air strike, leaving tens of killed and injured civilians.

The fifth activity discussed another important issue, and that is limiting the journalistic freedoms. Subay and his friends painted the murals inside the Syndicate of Yemeni Journalists, to highlight the systematic detention of journalists and the violations committed against the journalistic freedoms.

After that, in the sixth activity of the campaign, they discussed the issue of the siege on Yemen, whether it was placed by the regional conflict parties or the internal ones, limiting the access of food, medicine, water and humanitarian assistance to those who need it.

Subay painted the seventh mural in London, where he discussed the ignoring of international community and media of the conflicts in Yemen.

In the eighth activity of "Ruins" campaign, Subay and fellow artists painted about the economy collapse in Yemen. They painted the murals in front of Yemen Central Bank after the value of Yemeni Rial against the US Dollar dropped significantly, adding another misfortune to the already impoverished nation.

== Open Painting Days ==
Aside from painting in the streets through campaigns that each have a special theme, Subay invited people to paint openly in the streets on the third and forth anniversaries of his first street art campaign "Color the Wall of Your Street" on March 15.

=== March 15, 2015 ===
Through his Facebook page, Subay invited people to paint openly along with him in the streets on the third anniversary of his first street art campaign "Color the Walls of Your Streets" on March 15, 2015, an event which he called "Humans and Art Day". He invited people to the event to express their love for life, beauty, homeland, and their fear of an expected civil war. They painted on one of the walls of Hadda street in Central Sana'a city.

=== (March 15 – March 17), 2016 ===
Due to the many requests Murad received from people next year, he extended the duration of the open painting day event to become three days instead of one, so that many people could have the chance to join in. Murad chose a wall in front of a police station, and from the first day of the event, soldiers and police officers joined them in painting the walls.

== Exhibitions ==
2016 – Group Exhibition, Yemeni Film & Arts Festival, The Yemen Peace Project, NY, USA.

2016 – Group Exhibition, Yemeni Film & Arts Festival, The Yemen Peace Project, DC, USA.

2014 – Group Exhibition, Talk Love .. Act Peace, Contemporary Art Platform (CAP), Kuwait.

2014 – Group Exhibition, Unrest: Art, Activism & Revolution, Helen Day Art Center, VT, USA.

== Awards/Grants ==
2016 - Freedom of Expression Arts Award and Fellowship Program, Index on Censorship Organization, London, UK.

2015 - Certificate of Appreciation, UN (ESCWA), Beirut, Lebanon.

2014 - The Art for Peace Award, Veronesi Foundation, Milan, Italy.

2014 - The Youth Shield for Creativity, Yemeni socialist Party, Sana'a, Yemen.

2013 - The Innovation Shield, the American Islamic Congress Organization, Sana'a, Yemen.

== See also ==
- Amna Al-Nasiri
- Shatha Altowai
- Hashem Ali
- Yemeni Revolution
