= Human rights film festival =

Activist film festival

A human rights film festival is an activist film festival that screens films on human rights-related topics and hosts pre/post-screening events to promote awareness for human rights causes. Human rights film festivals fall beneath the category of topic specific film festivals. These festivals employ the use of universal human rights language, made popular by the United Nations Declaration of Human Rights, to convey the importance of the festivals' programmes to their audiences. The first human rights film festival to take place anywhere around the world was the New York City based Human Rights Watch International Film Festival (HRWIFF) in 1988. Since then many other human rights film festivals have formed around the world with the most notable festivals being One World International Human Rights Documentary Film Festival in Prague, Movies that Matter in The Hague, International Film Festival and Forum on Human Rights (FIFDH) in Geneva, Festival Internacional de Cine de Derechos Humanos (FICDH) in Buenos Aires, and Freedom Film Festival (FFF), organized in Kuala Lumpur. Movies that Matter has also created The Human Rights Film Network which aids in facilitating the creation of new human rights film festivals, while also allowing existing human rights film festivals membership to their network by agreeing to abide by their Charter. Although human rights film festivals are widely praised for their efforts to raise awareness on human rights issues they have also been subject to criticism surrounding issues of the "humanitarian gaze", NGOization, and commercialization.

== History ==
The Human Rights Watch International Film Festival (HRWIFF) was the first film festival to focus specially on human rights films. It began in 1988 the same year that the parent organization Helsinki Watch was renamed becoming Human Rights Watch at the end of the Cold War. As a result of the end of the Cold War and the victory of liberalism over socialism many of the films shown at HRWIFF reflect civil and political rights (individual freedoms) versus economic, social and cultural rights (group rights) as has been the case with most human rights film festivals. The festival became a yearly event starting in 1995 and takes place at the Lincoln Center, a major arts and cultural institution in Manhattan, New York. New York is a significant location for human rights as it is the location of the headquarters of the United Nations, the international organizational body that created the United Nations Declaration of Human Rights. It is widely referred to and has been normalized as the basis for human rights language and discourse. HRWIFF was a founding member of the Human Rights Film Network but is no longer listed as a member.

== Notable festivals ==
Amnesty International Film Festival, which began in 1995, became Movies that Matter International in 2006. Originally the festival's headquarters were shared with the headquarters of Amnesty International in Amsterdam, Netherlands. Although the festival's main sponsor is still Amnesty International it has since moved to The Hague, the Netherlands a city widely known to host many non-government organizations (NGOs) working towards promoting human rights related goals. According to film festival scholar Marijk de Valck the main priority when programming the festival is to appease the desires of the audience and cater to partner/sponsor NGOs all the while promoting human rights causes. Movies that Matter created the Human Rights Film Network and helps other festivals through funding, a network of collaboration, and education on how to run a human rights film festival.

One World International Human Rights Documentary Film Festival (known as One World) began in 1999 in Prague, Czech Republic, under the leadership of Igor Blaževiĉ and is the largest human rights film festival in the world. One World boasts the largest number of thematic sections in a human rights film festival and runs for eleven days. It is a competitive festival with jury prizes. The competitions for festival prizes focus on both aesthetics and commitment to human rights issues. It is also used as a meeting place for documentary filmmakers and professionals with interests in the documentary film field as the festival hosts the East Doc Platform a training, and funding event by the Institute for Documentary Film.

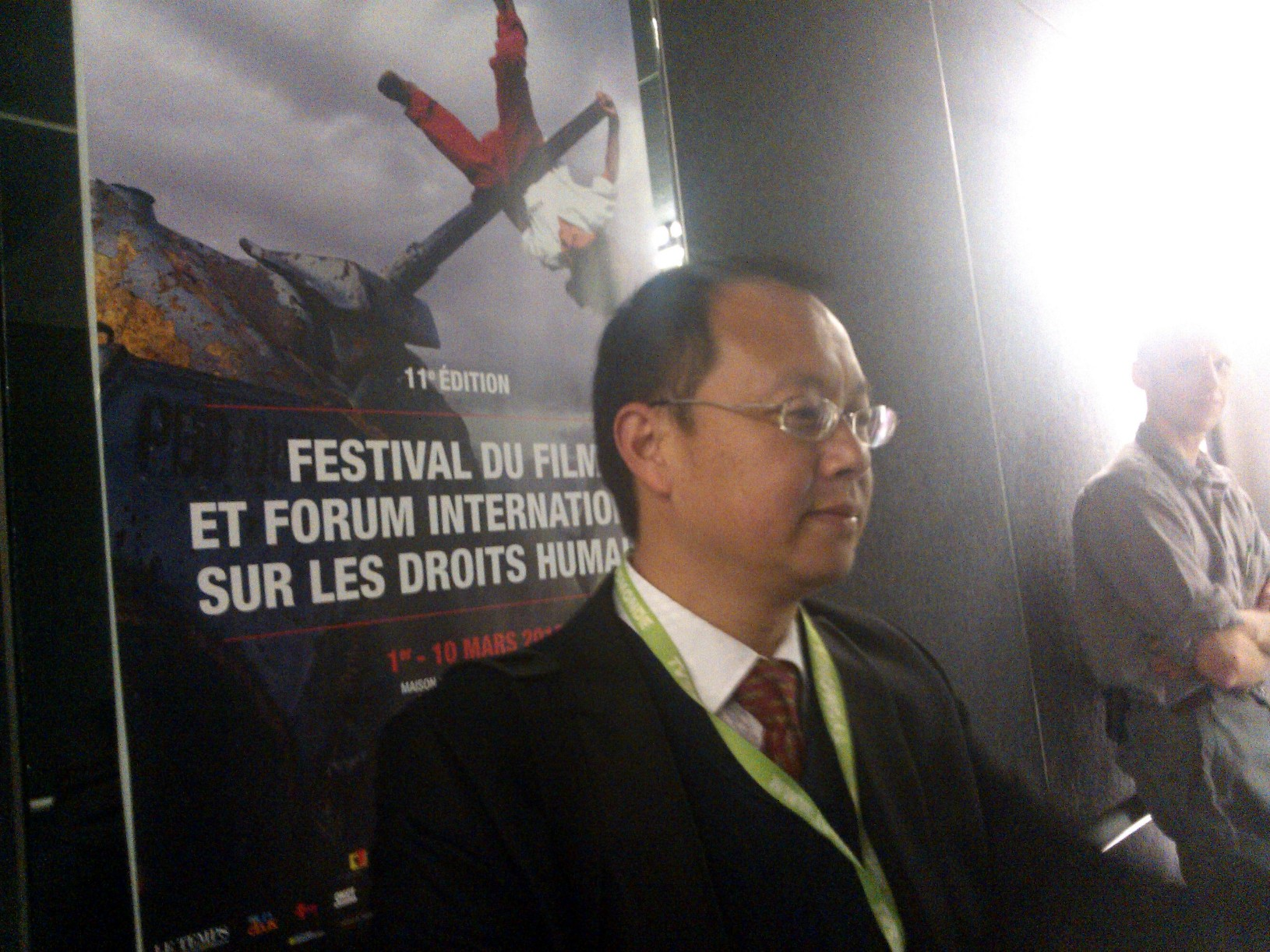
Festival du Film et Forum International sur les Droits Humains/International Film Festival and Forum on Human Rights (FIFDH

International Film Festival and Forum on Human Rights (FIFDH) takes place annually in Geneva, Switzerland and has been running since 2002. Geneva is a significant location for the festival as it houses many human rights NGOs and is known as the "international capital of human rights". The festival is supported by the World Organization Against Torture and coincides annually with the main meeting of the United Nations Human Rights Council. The festival promotes its forum as the most important human rights event of the year.

While many human rights film festivals are located in the Global North, many important film festivals also occur in the Global South, such as the Festival Internacional de Cine de Derechos Humanos (FICDH) in Buenos Aires, Argentina, which has taken place since 1997 and has been one of the most important human rights film festival events ever since. Over the years it has dealt with issues of the military dictatorships in Argentina in the 1970s and 1980s. It has also focused its screening attention on the cause of the Madres de Plaza de Mayo. Since the economic crisis that took place in 2001, after a failed attempt of government imposed neoliberalism, the festival has also dealt with issues of immigration caused by the opening of Latin American borders and land grabs impacting Indigenous Peoples.

Freedom Film Festival (FFF) is a travelling human rights film festival, which is organized in Kuala Lumpur and travels throughout Malaysia. It has taken place every year since 2003 and is supported by the largest local human rights NGO Komas. It is the country's only international human rights film festival. The festival acts as a meeting place for activists and filmmakers to show films/videos while also functioning as a local distribution network where copies of films are exchanged. Freedom Film Festival films screened in 2012 and 2014 at StoS Festival in Jakarta, Indonesia, funded by partner NGO EngageMedia. This allowed the Indonesian audience to see similar activism happening across the region creating a solidarity network. It also allowed films strictly censored in Malaysia to reach an audience in Jakarta.

== Criticism ==
Some criticisms levelled at human rights film festivals, according to social work studies scholar Sonia Tascón, are their tendency, in a 'Western' context, to look out. Looking out is problematized by Tascón when gazing at Others occurs without having the gaze returned, also called the "humanitarian gaze". Tascón also raises the issues of the politics of representation and what is involved in the ability to show the suffering of Others. Film festival scholars Ezra Winton and Svetla Turnin also explain that since film festivals are commercial spaces, depicting human rights in this context raises questions regarding their commodification under capitalism and neoliberalism. These criticisms have been levelled by Winton and Turnin to consider how films on human rights topics can be shown in a film festival setting without losing their radical and revolutionary characteristics, to make the audience feel activated rather than only empathetic.
