= Saba Jallas =

Yemeni artist

- Education: University of Sanaa
- Known for: Drawing and poetry

Saba Jallas is a Yemeni artist, whose work gained recognition during the Yemeni Civil War. Her work transforms images of smoke from airstrikes and bombings in Yemeni cities.

== Education ==
Jallas graduated with a degree in French Literature from Sanaa University in 2007.

== Life and work ==
Inspired by the work of Palestinian artists Tawfik Gebreel, Bushra Shanan and Belal Khaled, Jallas manipulates photographs of smoke taken on her phone of airstrikes and bombs in Yemeni cities to create images of hope. Her work centres images of women, often embracing children or looking happy. As Jallas explains, "Maybe because I see women as a symbol of compassion". Through her artwork, Jallas finds an outlet to express her “humanity and absolute optimism...I find that the solution lies in loving each other. And that’s why I was keen on showcasing, through my artworks, even a sliver of beauty in this war.”

In 2010, Jallas' brother, an officer in the Yemeni army, was killed in conflict.

Egypt's Opera House held a solo exhibit, "Awtar," of Jallas's work in 2021.

== See also ==
- Murad Subay
