= Saber Came to Tea =

2021 short play

- Promotional poster for Saber Came to Tea
- Original language: Arabic (with live English surtitles)
- Written by: Robert Rae; Saber Bamatraf; Shatha Altowai; Ghazi Hussein
- Music by: Saber Bamatraf (composition and piano); Phil Westwell (Uilleann pipes and flute); Katherine Campbell (cello)
- Characters: Afnan (bride); Saber (groom); Ali (uncle); Ahmed (father); Seham (mother); Khalid (brother); Arwa (Aunt)
- Genre: Drama; Entertainment

Premiere
- Date: 8 October 2021
- Place: Southside Community Centre, Edinburgh, UK
- Directed by: Robert Rae

Saber Came to Tea is a dramatic short play collaboratively written by Yemeni artists-in-exile Saber Bamatraf and Shatha Altowai, Palestinian poet Ghazi Hussein and Scottish playwright and director Robert Rae. The play premiered in October 2021 at the Southside Community Centre, Edinburgh.

Supported by Art27Scotland, IIE-Artist Protection Fund and IASH at the University of Edinburgh, the production integrates original music and multimedia elements. Based on real events, it tells the story of a young Yemeni couple navigating cultural traditions and personal aspirations amid societal expectations and conflict.

== Background ==
Bamatraf and Altowai relocated to Edinburgh in November 2020 with the support from the Artist Protection Fund after the escalation of the civil war in Yemen posed significant risks to their artistic activities. The couple had previously been featured in the short documentary, Voice of the Rainbow, which explored their shared artistic practice and themes of women's freedom and societal constraints in Yemen. The film sparked controversy and backlash from the Houthi group resulting in threats against them. Following their relocation to Edinburgh, Saber Came to Tea emerged as one of the creative research outcomes of their fellowships at the University of Edinburgh.

At the same time, Art27Scotland, a newly established organisation in Edinburgh co-founded by playwright Robert Rae and Helen Trew with a focus on cultural rights, was seeking to engage with artists from diverse backgrounds. Rae, reflecting on their meeting with Bamatraf and Altowai, stated in an interview with The National, "It struck me that here’s a real opportunity in terms of the context of what Art27 does."

== Plot and themes ==
The play is set in a traditional Hadhrami household and revolves around a young groom who visits his new wife's family in a rural village. The narrative delves into cultural practices, particularly gender segregation customs in Hadhramaut, where men and women are separated by a curtain during family gatherings over Bukhari tea— a steamed tea served as part of Hadhrami cultural rituals, involving specific teaware. Through this setting, the play examines social dynamics, gender roles, and the tensions between tradition and modernity.

Based on the couple's real-life experiences, the play introduces a dramatic twist by exploring what might happen if these strict societal roles were challenged. It delves into the potential consequences, differing perspectives, and the complex interplay of cross-generational and intercultural dynamics within a conservative society, alongside the challenges amid the ongoing Yemeni conflict.

The drama, performed in Arabic with English subtitles, is accompanied by visual elements, including footage from the civil war in Yemen and excerpts from the documentary Voice of the Rainbow. Director Robert Rae noted in an interview that the play juxtaposes the destruction of war with the beauty of Yemeni culture.

== Inspiration ==
Saber Came to Tea was inspired by real-life experiences from Bamatraf and Altowai's early marriage, including their having to live apart due to the civil war and their struggles with societal expectations. The concept for the play originated with Bamatraf and Altowai while they were still in Yemen; however, societal sensitivities prevented them from developing it further. After presenting their idea to Rae in Edinburgh, he collaborated with the couple to translate their experiences into a theatrical narrative, an outcome they had not initially anticipated, as mentioned in an interview with Shabab House.

The couple aimed to introduce Yemeni cultural practices to Scottish audiences, using the play as a medium to foster cross-cultural understanding. While inspired by the real-life event of Saber's first visit to Shatha's village and his encounter with their traditions, they introduced a dramatic twist by posing the question, "What if these household roles were broken in the room?" as Bamatraf explained in an interview with Shabab House. This addition provided a theatrical narrative with a deeper dramatic exploration.

The play's title is a nod to the well-known children's book *The Tiger Who Came to Tea*.

== Cast and performances ==
The original cast featured:

- Shatha Altowai as Afnan (the bride)
- Saber Bamatraf as Saber (the groom)
- Ghazi Hussein as Uncle Ali (Afnan's uncle)
- Ahmed Ali as Khaled (Afnan's brother-in-law)
- Waseem Abuaglain as Ahmed (Afnan's father)
- Seham Ali as Fatima (Afnan's mother)
- Azza Dhaif-Allah as Arwa (Afnan's aunt)

Altowai noted that portraying a character based on her own experiences was emotionally challenging, to ease the emotional burden, she decided to change the character's name.

== Music ==
The performance incorporates live music on stage, with four compositions by Saber Bamatraf performed on piano, accompanied by Scottish musicians Phil Westwell (Uilleann pipes and flute) and Katherine Campbell (cello). Three of the compositions were performed as a prelude to the play, while the final piece was featured in the outro

The compositions performed in the play include:

- Mirrored Autumn
- The Alleys
- Arabia
- The White Canvas

== Productions ==
=== Southside Community Centre (October 2021) ===
The play premiered over two consecutive evenings at the Southside Community Centre in Edinburgh. The event featured a panel discussion with Bamatraf and Altowai, moderated by UK-based human rights activists and journalists, including Shaista Aziz, Samina Chaudhry and Yasmin Luqman. The discussions explored themes related to the role of art, women in exile, and the impact of the Yemeni conflict.

The event was held alongside Altowai's exhibition, Scratched Identities, which garnered support from several MSPs, including Labour representatives Sarah Boyack and Monica Lennon. The exhibition explores themes that align with those in the play, such as the challenges faced by Yemeni women who are compelled to conceal their identities.

The event is considered the first theatrical production by Yemeni artists to be presented in Scotland.

=== ZOO Venues at Edinburgh Festival Fringe (August 2022) ===
Saber Came to Tea was re-staged at the Edinburgh Festival Fringe in August 2022 as part of Art27Scotland's Firsthand series in ZOO Venues. The play ran for two days and received positive engagement from audiences and critics alike.

== Reception ==
The play was well received by the diverse communities in Edinburgh, as well as critics. Audiences were immersed in its blend of music, multimedia, and personal storytelling. Critics highlighted its ability to provide insight into Yemeni culture while addressing universal themes of love, tradition, and resilience. Bamatraf's music, particularly the piece Arabia, was praised for its role in enhancing the narrative and fostering an emotional connection with the audience.

== See also ==
- Saber Bamatraf
- Shatha Altowai
- Women in Yemen
- Amr Gamal
- The Tiger Who Came to Tea
