= Heritage Symphonies =

Cultural foundation project in Yemen

- السيمفونيات التراثية
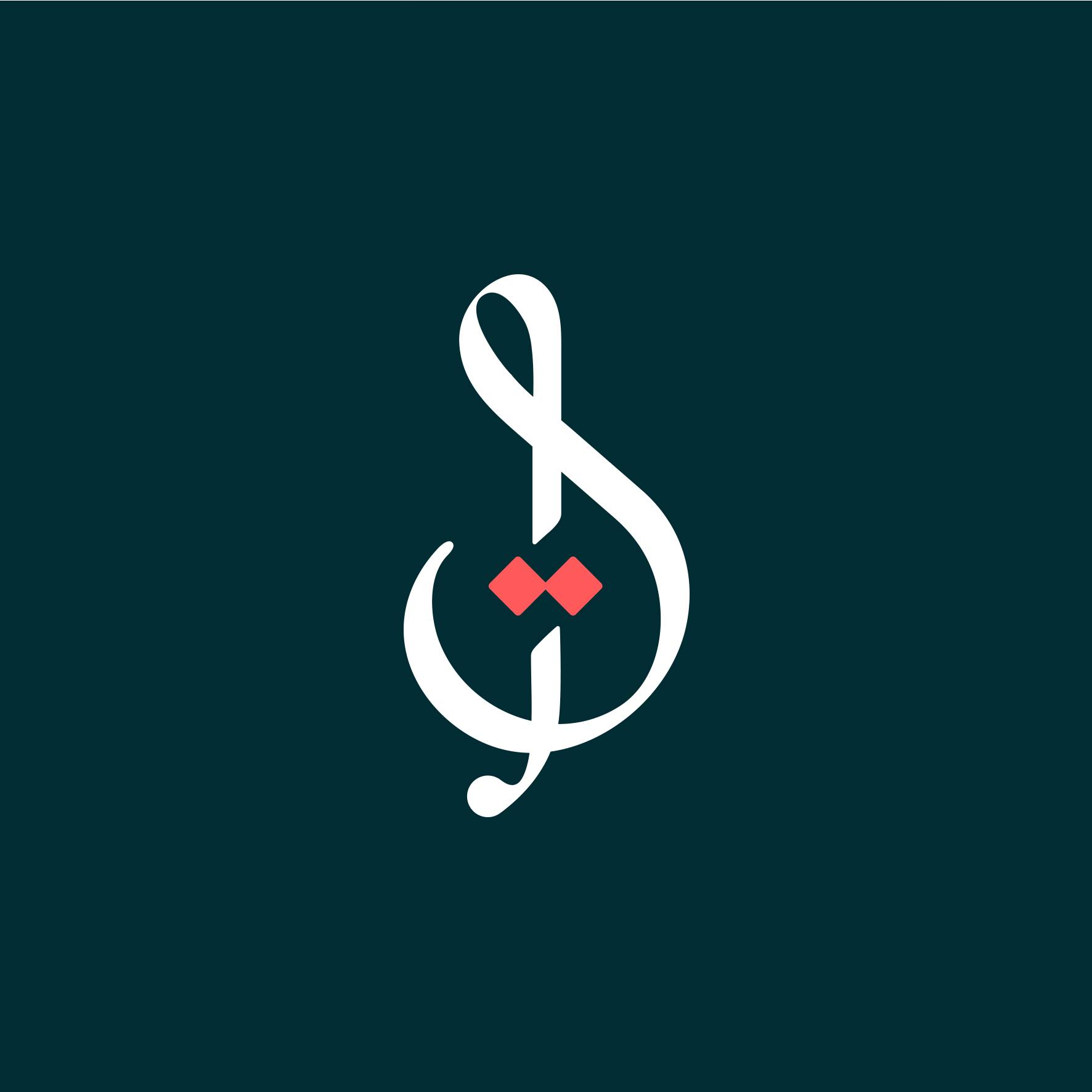
- Formation: 2019
- Concerts Manager: Radhi Hudijan
- General Director: Mohamed Al-Ghoom
- Parent organization: Hadhramout Culture foundation, Ministry of Culture (Yemen)
- Website: https://hsymphonies.com

Heritage Symphonies (Arabic: السيمفونيات التراثية, romanized: Al-Symphoniat Al-Thuratiah) is a cultural foundation project founded in 2019 in Yemen, it aims to promote and disseminate folk music, by integrating it into an orchestral performance that combines folk music styles and traditional instruments with Western instruments.

In addition to the music, the project showcases the performers with their distinctive cultural identity, represented by musical instruments, traditional rhythms, folk dance, and traditional dresses, in addition to presenting other cultural events accompanying the concert activities.

== Events ==
In 2019, Mohamed Al-Ghoom performed an orchestral concert in Kuala Lumpur, Malaysia, titled "Hope from the depth of pain". He led an orchestra comprising 90 musicians, including 30 from Hadramout, who played on traditional Hadrami musical and percussion instruments while the other musicians were from China, India, Malaysia, Japan, and Uzbekistan.

On March 10, 2022, Mohamed led a second orchestral concert titled "Yemeni melody on the banks of the Nile" in Cairo, in which more than 120 musicians of different nationalities performed on the stage of the Grand Theater at the Egyptian Opera House, and eight musical pieces of traditional colors was presented in an orchestral format.

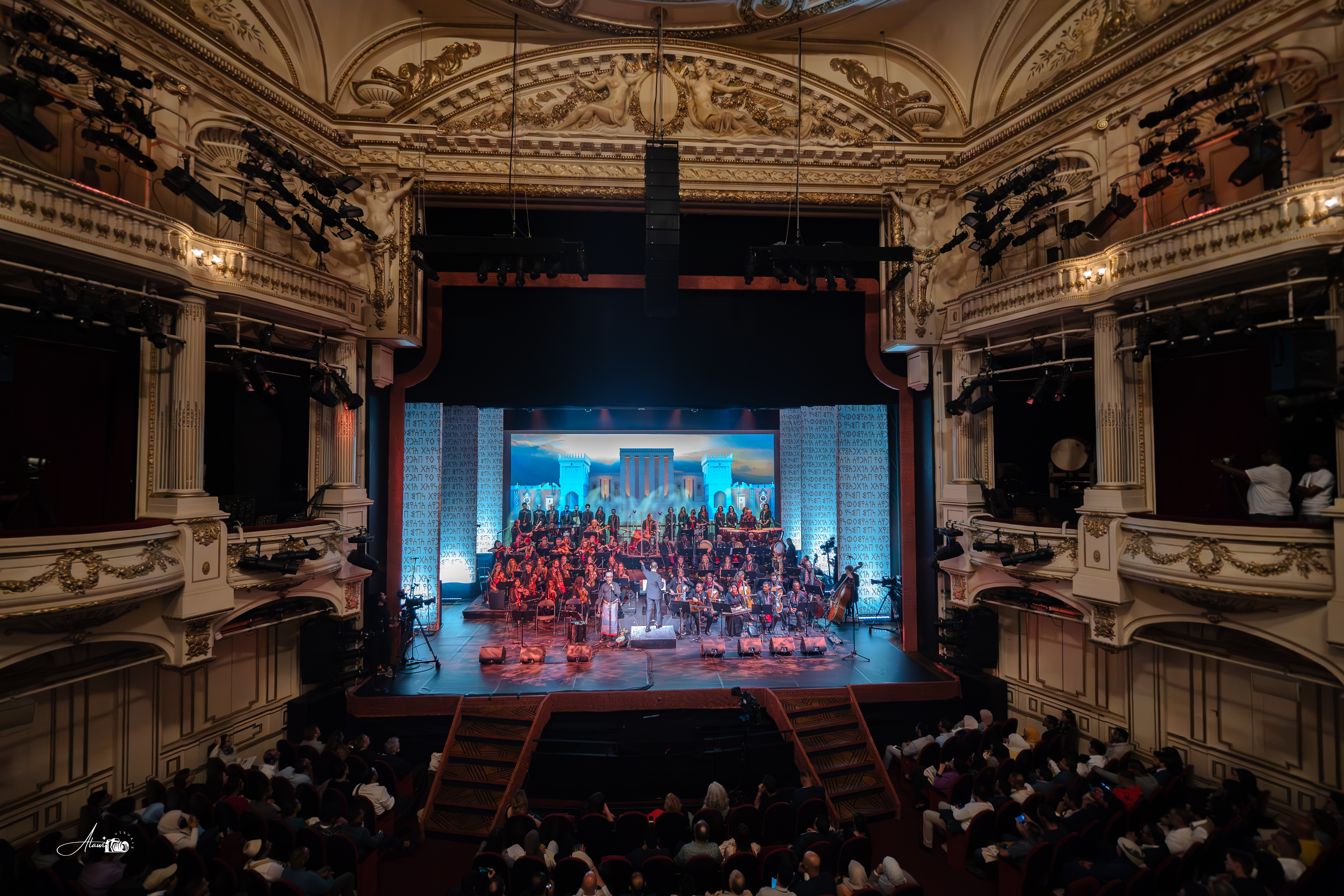
"Yemeni Tunes in Paris" led by Mohamed Al-Ghoom in the Théâtre Mogador

On October 2, 2023, a third orchestral concert titled "Yemeni tune in Paris" was held in France.

Event name	Location	Date	Video link
Hope from the depth of pain	Malaysia	13 April 2019	–
Yemeni melody on the banks of the Nile	Egypt	10 March 2022	
Yemeni tunes in Paris	France	2 October 2023	
The Hadhrami Orchestra	Kuwait	18 October 2023 changed to 18-19 February 2024	–
Yemeni Tunes in Doha	Qatar	20 June 2024	
Yemeni Orchestra	Saudi Arabia	17 November 2024	
	Qatar	29-30 November 2024	–
	Kuwait	8-9 January 2025	–
	Dubai	25 January 2025	–
	Bahrain	20 February 2025	–
	Oman	April 24 and 25, 2025	–
	United States		–
