= Shatha Altowai =

Yemeni visual artist (b. 1989)

Shatha Altowai شذى التوي
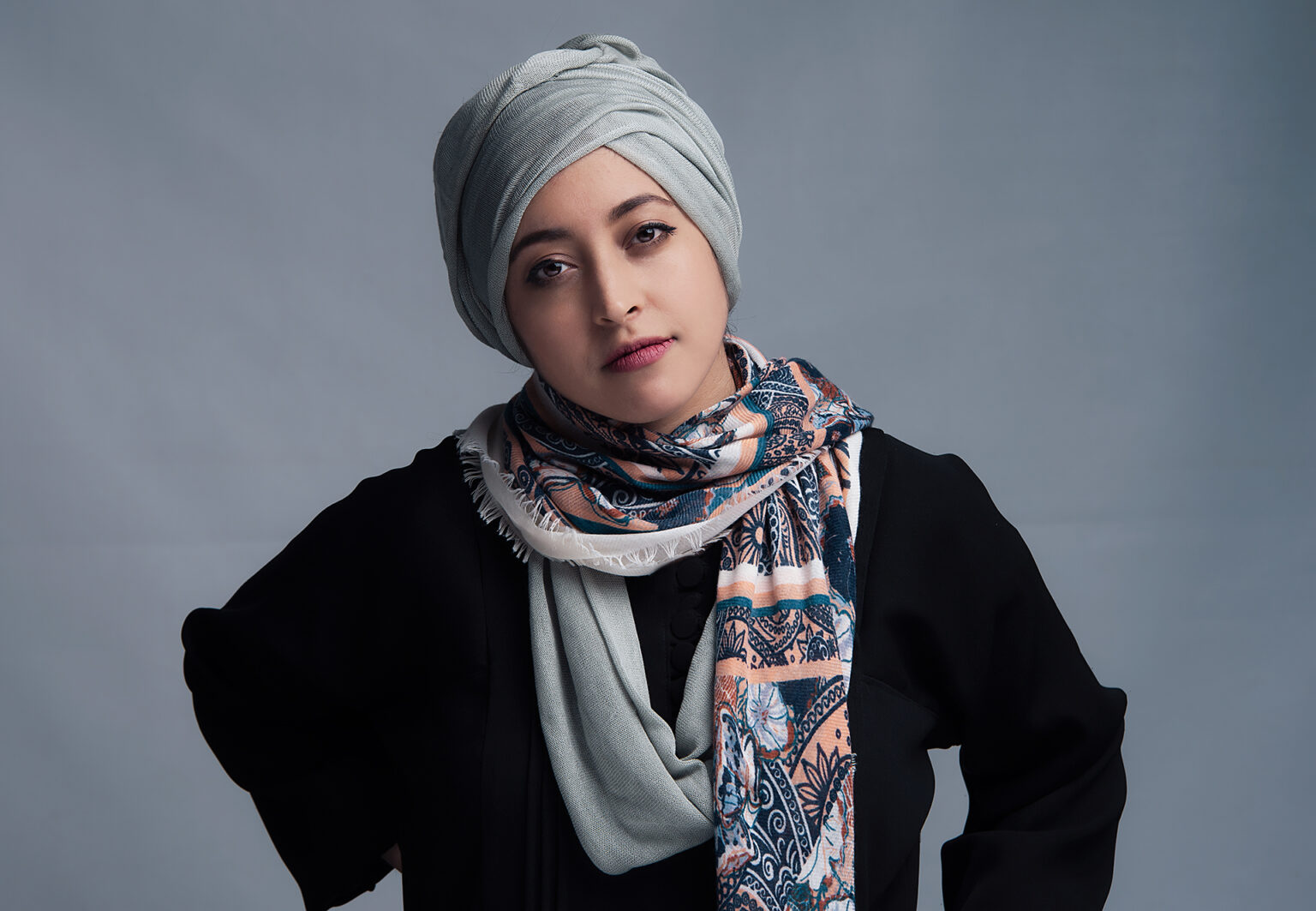
- Shatha Altowai in 2019
- Born: October 21, 1989 (age 36); Aden, Democratic Yemen (now Yemen)
- Education: Universiti Utara Malaysia
- Years active: 2014–present
- Employer: University of Edinburgh
- Known for: Visual art, painting
- Spouse: Saber Bamatraf (m. 2014–present)
- Website: www.shathaaltowai.com

Shatha Altowai (Arabic: شذى التوي) is a Yemeni visual artist known for her figurative, cubist, and abstract oil paintings. She lives in Edinburgh, Scotland. Her work explores issues such as identity, displacement, women, children, and the impact of the civil war in Yemen. She is also known for her artistic collaboration and activism with her husband, the Yemeni pianist and composer Saber Bamatraf.

Altowai has received multiple awards, this includes the IIE-Artist Protection Fund award that was hosted at the Institute for Advanced Studies in the Humanities (IASH) within the University of Edinburgh from 2020 to 2021,The John Byrne Award in 2021, and The Scottish Women's Award 2022.

She has been based in Edinburgh since November 2020.

== Early life and education ==
Shatha Altowai was born in 1989 in Aden, Democratic Yemen (now Yemen), to a Hadhrami family descending from Shibam. She spent most of her life in the Yemeni capital, Sana'a, where she completed her schooling. In 2014, she graduated with a Bachelor of Information Technology with honours from Universiti Utara Malaysia, studying at its Sana'a branch.

During her university years, she met her future husband, Saber Bamatraf, who was also pursuing the same degree. The couple married in August 2014, just a month before the fall of Sana'a to the Houthi rebels.

== Early career in Yemen ==
After her graduation in 2014, Altowai worked in various administrative and IT roles. By 2017, she decided to leave her professional career entirely and focus fully on her artistic pursuits.

In several interviews, Altowai has stated that her connection with art began during her early childhood, with her paintings often displayed in the hallways of her school, earning her the nickname "the violet painter." However, as she grew older, her artistic passion waned due to the lack of art schools in Yemen and, as she explained in an interview with Al-Madaniya Magazine, her focus also shifted during adolescence to academics and other priorities, which temporarily distanced her from art. She credits her marriage in 2014 as the catalyst for rediscovering her artistic spirit, inspired by her husband’s musical compositions on the piano.

The couple began their artistic journey together by hosting small-scale events, gradually moving to public venues like the Basement Cultural Foundation and TEDx events. Their collaborative performances, which combined Altowai's paintings with Bamatraf's piano compositions, quickly gained popularity and marked the beginning of their shared artistic journey.

=== Struggle during wartime ===
In July 2015, Altowai’s house was damaged in a Saudi-led Coalition airstrike that hit a neighbouring building, forcing her and her husband to become displaced. According to Altowai and Bamatraf, navigating the public sphere as an artistic couple in Yemen posed substantial challenges, particularly due to the country’s conservative and patriarchal norms, which often restrict women's participation in public life and artistic expression. The ongoing conflict further complicated these dynamics, creating an intensified environment for artists.

Despite these hardships, Altowai continued to participate in various artistic and public events across Yemen alongside her husband. She has often described her art as a form of resilience and self-expression, allowing her to navigate and confront the challenges posed by the war and societal constraints.

=== Voice of the Rainbow (2018) ===
Altowai's story and her artistic collaboration with her husband Bamatraf gained wider attention and were featured in a short documentary Voice of the Rainbow (Arabic: صوت قزح), which was selected to be screened at the Karama Human Rights Film Festival that was supposed to take place in Sana'a in October 2018.

The poster for the film, depicting Altowai and her husband surrounded by art and music materials, led to a backlash from Houthi rebel group, resulting in the suspension of the festival and threats against the couple, forcing them to suspend their public art practice during their remaining time in Yemen.

For more detailed information, see The controversy around the film.

=== I Have Met the Enemy (2019) ===
Altowai participated in theatre in October 2019, taking part in the Commonwealth Theatre's production of I Have Met the Enemy (and the Enemy is Us) as one of the three main actors. The play explored the UK arms trade and its global impact through a collaborative and personal narrative.

Altowai's performance, delivered via a pre-recorded video projection, incorporated her experiences, including the impact of the 2015 airstrike that damaged her house.

== Move to Edinburgh ==
In November 2021, Shatha Altowai relocated to Edinburgh after receiving the Artist Protection Fund Fellowship Award, with the Institute for Advanced Studies in the Humanities (IASH) serving as her host institution at the University of Edinburgh. This opportunity enabled her to resume her artistic endeavours and create new collections of work, including the Family Series, which earned her the first prize in the John Byrne Award for four paintings from the series, accompanied by a statement titled "What is More Painful? Hunger or Fear?". Another collection she developed during this period was Scratched Identities.

Altowai’s work was showcased in several exhibitions, including The White Canvas exhibition in July 2021 at (IASH), where she presented the entire set of the Family Series. Additionally, she exhibited Scratched Identities in collaboration with Art27Scotland.

=== The White Canvas (2021) ===
The White Canvas exhibition by Shatha examined the challenges faced by Yemeni families during the ongoing war, with a particular focus on the experiences since the conflict escalated. The series aims to document and reflect on the daily struggles for basic necessities—such as food, water, electricity, fuel, and security—as well as the solidarity among families in Yemen.

Shatha’s work captures the complex interplay of strength and fear experienced by those living under constant threat. After relocating to Edinburgh, she observed a stark contrast between the ease of accessing basic needs in her new environment and the hardships endured by families back home. This led her to explore the theme of family more deeply in her art. In this series, she numbers the families rather than naming them, a choice that mirrors the reduction of individuals to mere statistics in both Yemeni and international media narratives.

The exhibition comprises 17 oil paintings on canvas. Notable works include:

- Family No. 1 (Winner of The John Byrne Award): This painting depicts a mother holding her children amid the chaos of bombardments. It references the moment in March 2015 when Shatha and her family first heard an approaching airstrike, shortly after the Saudi-led coalition began its attacks in Yemen.
- Family No. 3 (Winner of The John Byrne Award): This work portrays a neighbourhood where, during intensified air raids, women and children gathered in a single house with an underground shelter while the men waited outside. The painting also alludes to the destruction of that shelter by two airstrikes in July 2015, which resulted in casualties and significant damage to Shatha’s own home, displacing her and her husband for two years.
- Family No. 12: This painting, styled to echo the composition of traditional Last Supper artworks, shows family members gathered around a single dish. The work poignantly raises the question that Shatha associated with her entry for The John Byrne Award, "What is more painful? Hunger or fear?".

In addition to the paintings, the exhibition features an audio-visual component titled *The White Canvas: There Was a Family Here*. In collaboration with her husband, Saber, Shatha co-created this piece. Saber composed a piano piece using the white keys of the D minor scale, which accompanies a stark, entirely white painting. The composition and image together evoke a reflective mood, prompting viewers to consider the absence of life and the loss experienced by communities affected by conflict.

=== Scratched Identities (2021) ===
In Scratched Identities, Shatha Altowai sought to highlight the challenges faced by Yemeni women who are compelled to conceal their identities. As an act of solidarity, she invited women in Scotland to participate in the project. The exhibition garnered support from several MSPs, including Labour representatives Sarah Boyack and Monica Lennon. Lennon said: “Shatha’s exhibition is a powerful visualisation of what happens when freedom is taken from women because of societal constraints. Being involved in the project has made me more determined to fight for gender equality.”

=== Saber Came to Tea (2021) ===
As part of the collaboration with Art27Scotland, Altowai and her husband co-created a short play titled Saber Came to Tea. In this production, the couple performed the main roles.

Following the completion of her fellowship, Altowai joined Art27Scotland as an artist-in-residence in 2022. During this time, she re-presented the play Saber Came to Tea at the Edinburgh Festival Fringe in August 2022.

== Other endeavours ==
In 2022, Altowai's artistic contributions were recognised with The Scottish Women’s Award for Art and Culture Moreover, a segment of her story with her husband, featured in BBC Scotland’s Loop (Series 4, Episode 3), was named a finalist in the Refugee Festival Scotland Media Awards 2022.

In 2023, Altowai began a residency at Edinburgh Printmakers, where she explored printmaking for the first time. During this residency, she created an artwork entitled Monument of Loss, which was exhibited at the Uprooted Visions exhibition at Edinburgh Printmakers in May 2023.

Shatha Altowai's artwork Monument of Loss has been described as "stunningly intricate," conveying a profound sense of weight and burden. Rendered in a striking blood-red colour, the abstract figures are composed of numerical tallies resembling surgical stitches. A reviewer noted that one of the pieces features six contorted figures supporting oval forms, evocative of infants, symbolising the heavy emotional toll carried by parents amid the ongoing civil war in Yemen. The artwork consists of 3 prints aims to reflect on the devastating impact of the Yemeni conflict, which has resulted in the deaths and severe injuries of over 11,000 children since 2015.

Altowai participated in an event titled Reflections on Exile and Displacement from Institute of Middle Eastern, Central Asia and Caucasus Studies (MECACS) at the University of St Andrews. She also led a community art project with women from diverse backgrounds in Edinburgh, culminating in an art installation titled Inherited Incantations, which was showcased at the Festival of Migration in June 2023.

Altowai joined the musical ensemble The Other as a visual artist-in-residence. She created digital visual artworks that served as backdrops for the ensemble’s live performances during the Migration Festival. Her collaboration with the ensemble continued into 2024, including a notable performance at the Edinburgh Festival Fringe, where she and her husband joined the ensemble on stage and brought a multi-media piece called Just Like Her Mum.

In November 2024, Shatha Altowai was selected as a member of the inaugural Global Community for Women’s Leadership (GCWL) cohort by the IIE.

== Selected exhibitions ==
- 2021 – Solo Exhibition, The White Canvas, IASH (University of Edinburgh), Edinburgh, UK.
- 2021 – Solo exhibition, Scratched Identities, Art27Scotland, Edinburgh, UK.
- 2021 – Group exhibition, Art as a Tool for Peace, PeaceRep, at Edinburgh Law School.
- 2022 – Group exhibition, Women Artists Exhibition, Art27Scotland
- 2022 – Solo exhibition, The Displaced Paintings at Youth peacebuilding, Scotland and the World event, Bute Room, National Museum of Scotland.
- 2023 – Group exhibition, Uprooted Vision, Edinburgh Printmakers.
- 2023 – Group exhibition, Manchester Yemeni Community, Manchester, UK.
- 2023 – Group exhibition, Themes of displacement, statelessness, and exile across MECACS, University of St Andrews.
- 2023 – Group exhibition, Inherited Incantation, Art27Scotland's Festival of Migration.

== See also ==
- Saber Bamatraf
- Saber Came to Tea
- Amna Al-Nasiri
- Murad Subay
