= Théâtre Mogador =

Theatre in Paris, France

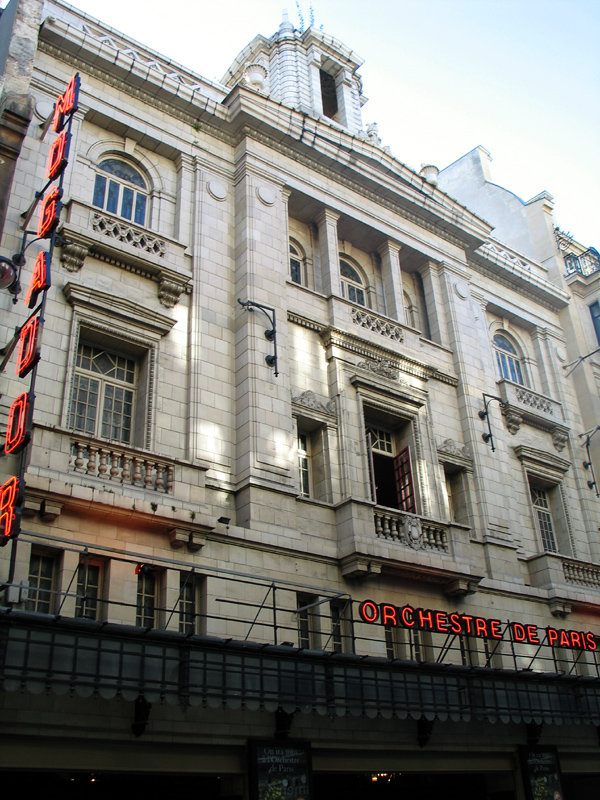
- Interactive map of Théâtre Mogador
- Address: 25, Rue de Mogador
- Location: Paris
- Coordinates: 48°52′31″N 2°19′52″E
- Owner: Stage Entertainment
- Capacity: 1,800

Construction
- Opened: 1913
- Renovated: 1983
- Architects: Bertie Crewe and Édouard Niermans

Website
- www.theatremogador.com

Théâtre Mogador (French pronunciation: [teɑtʁ mɔɡadɔʁ]), founded in 1913 with design by Bertie Crewe, is a Parisian music hall theatre located at 25, Rue de Mogador in the 9th arrondissement. It seats 1,600 people on three tiers (orchestra: 787 seats, boxes: 432 seats, balconies: 381 seats).

== History ==
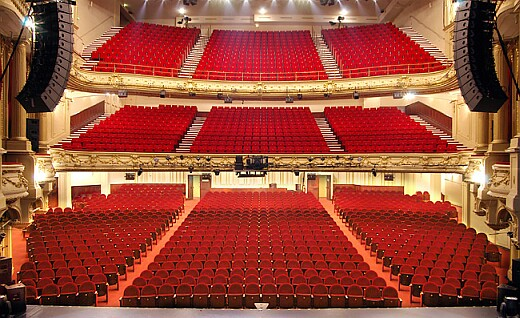
Théâtre Mogador's auditorium

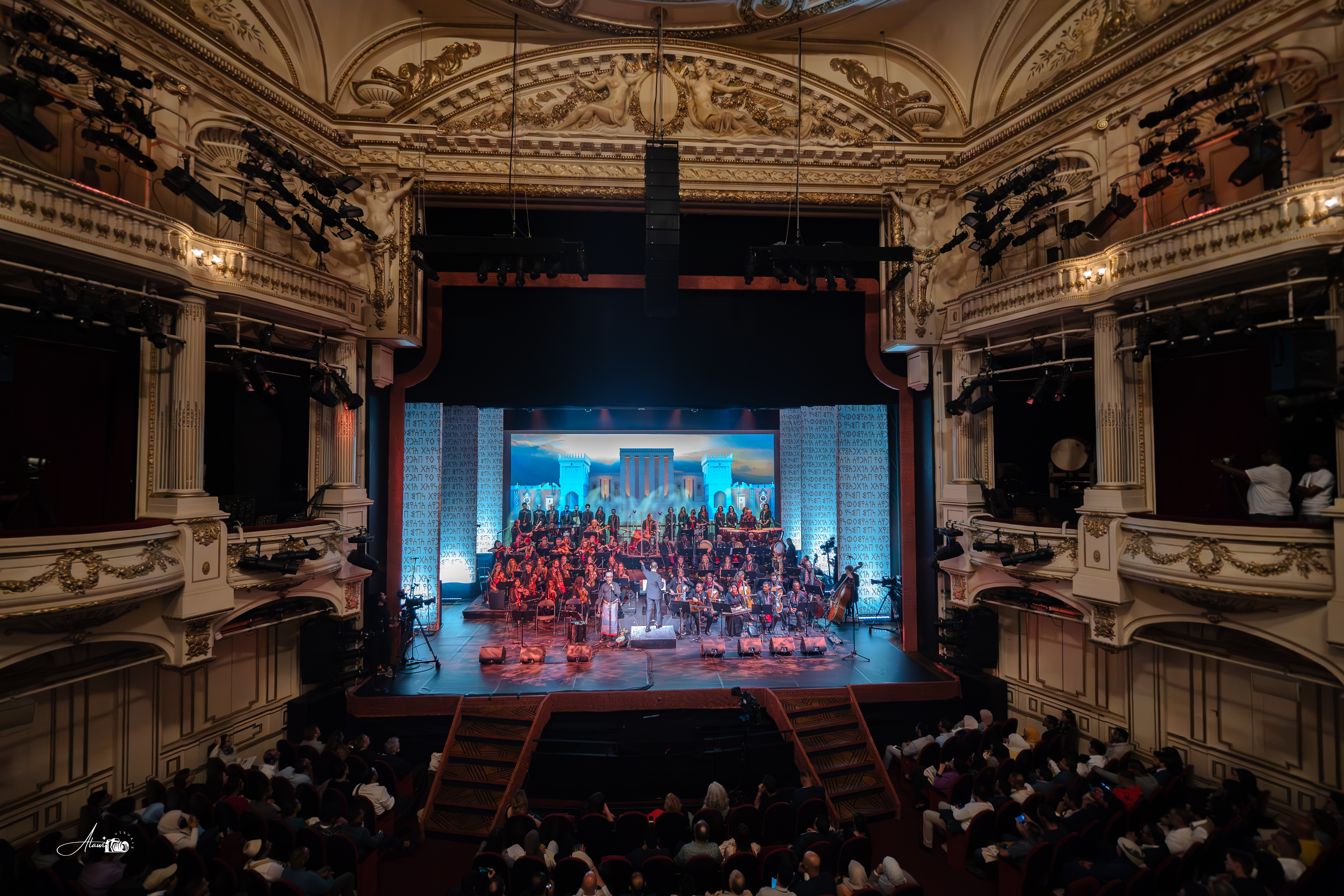
The theatre during the Yemeni Tunes in Paris concert

In 1913 financier Sir Alfred Butt rented an area in Paris. Built according to English music hall principles and style during World War I, the theatre was originally named the "Palace Theatre", after the like-named one in London, in order to appeal to British soldiers. The name was shortly thereafter changed to "Théâtre Mogador", Mogador being the old name of the town of Essaouira in Morocco. The 21 April 1919 official inauguration guests included US President Woodrow Wilson, in France to negotiate the Treaty of Versailles, as well as his successor Franklin Delano Roosevelt.

From 1920, it gained fame with the performances of Sergei Diaghilev's Ballets Russes, as well as with the Thés Mogador – performances of operettas and plays in the afternoon. In 1923–1924, it was renamed "Théâtre Cora Laparcerie" for a brief period, after the name of its then owner, Cora Laparcerie, before acquiring its current name from its street address. In 1924, it was a Cine-variety for a few months, before closing. The Isola brothers, Émile and Vincent Isola, re-opened it in 1925, launching the new American style of performances exemplified by shows such as No, No, Nanette, Rose-Marie and L'Auberge du Cheval blanc.

Until the 1970s, Théâtre Mogador was mainly used for performances of operettas, including Mistinguett. Marcel Merkès was a regular performer here from the late 1940s to the mid-1970s. An extensive renovation restored the building to new splendour in 1983. In 2005, it was purchased by the Stage Entertainment group (then called the "Stage Holding - The Theatre Group"). The theatre hosted the nineteenth Molière Awards (French theatre awards, known locally as the Nuit des Molières) on 9 May that year. It had previously hosted the awards' sixteenth and seventeenth editions on 1 April 2002 and 12 May 2003, respectively.

On 26 September 2016, a fire damaged several parts of the theatre, including the stage and props that would be used in the French-language production of The Phantom of the Opera. Because of this, the show's French premiere was indefinitely postponed.

== Notable productions ==
- The Ballets Russes (1920)
- Le Masque de fer (1 October 1923) – Play in four acts and in verse by Maurice Rostand
- No, no, Nanette (1930)
- L'Auberge du Cheval blanc (1930)
- Ça c'est parisien (1937 onwards)
- Hello, Dolly! (1972 onwards)
- In September 1981 The Clash played a seven-night residency supported by Wah! and The Beat
- Bring on the Night (film) (1985) captured the rehearsals and first performance of Sting and his new band The Blue Turtles
- La Légende de Jimmy, a rock opera about James Dean (22 September 1990 to February 1991)
- Les Misérables (1991–1992)
- Starmania (1993)
- Wild Woman Blues
- The Elvis story (2003–2004)
- Le Roi Lion (2007–2010)
- Time Out! (2011) performed by Ivo Niehe
- Mamma Mia! (2010–2012)
- Sister Act (2012–2013)
- La Belle et La Bête (2013–2014)
- Le Bal des Vampires (2014–2015)
- Cats (2015–2016)
- Le Fantôme de l'Opéra; the production would have taken place in 2016, but due to the September fire, it was cancelled
- Grease (2017–2018)
- Chicago (2018–2019)
- Ghost the Musical (2019)
- Le Roi Lion (2020–present)

== See also ==
- List of concert halls
