= Fuad Al-Futaih =

Yemeni artist (1948–2018)

- Born: Fuad Al-Futaih; 1 May 1948; Taiz of Yemen
- Died: 28 February 2018 (aged 69); Aden, Yemen
- Known for: Painting
- Movement: graphic

Fuad Al-Futaih (1948–2018) One of the pioneers of graphic art in Yemen, participated in 1978, (Graphic Exhibition of Arab artists), which was held by the Iraqi Cultural Center in London, representing Yemen. With three paintings: (fisherman) (Dodhiya) and (woman).

== Biography ==
He held several personal exhibitions in West Germany and Paris.

He participated in various international exhibitions, including the International Biennale of Art, San Francisco in 1973–1974.

He participated in the Arab Cultural Week West Germany in 1975. And in the Biennale of Ljubljana, Pennsylvania Biennale, 1976.

He held many personal exhibitions in Belgium, the Netherlands, Japan, France and other countries. He participated in group exhibitions, inside and outside Yemen.

Perform illustrations for a number of children's stories.

Fouad Alfatih was born in the stone in 1948.

He received a Diploma in Fine Arts from the Academy of Fine Arts in Düsseldorf, Germany.

Director of Fine Arts in the Ministry of Culture Sana'a. He then founded the first art gallery for a period of time.

It was then closed and emptied to the administration of the National Center for the Arts until it was discontinued in 2012.

He moved to Aden in recent years from 'Umrah after he divorced his German wife and married a Yemeni.

He stopped painting almost since 2012, and stayed in Aden until he died in 2018.
