= Israel, Palestine, and the United Nations =

Articles relating to the relationship of Israel and Palestine with the United Nations include:

- Israel and the United Nations
  - List of United Nations resolutions concerning Israel
- Palestine and the United Nations
  - List of United Nations resolutions concerning Palestine
