= List of human rights film festivals =

A human rights film festival is a subject specific film festival that presents films on topics related to human rights. They are a type of activist film festival. Many human rights film festivals show documentary films, however, some also include fiction, animated and short films. The first film festival with the title of a human rights film festival was the Human Rights Watch International Film Festival inaugurated in 1988. Many have emerged since then with the largest being the One World International Human Rights Documentary Film Festival in Prague. Under the stewardship of another prominent human rights film festival, Movies that Matter, the Human Rights Film Network has created a communal circuit of human rights film festivals which work with a guiding Charter towards an atmosphere of support and collaboration. The Human Rights Film Network uses the Universal Declaration of Human Rights as their moral centre. A large majority of the human rights film festivals listed below are members of the Human Rights Film Network.

== List ==
| Name | State, Province, Region, or City | Country | Established | Notes |
|---|---|---|---|---|
| 1905 International Human Rights Film Festival | Hong Kong | China | 2016 | Creating an Asia-Pacific hub for human rights filmmakers while engaging audiences on human rights issues. |
| ACT Human Rights Film Festival | Colorado | United States | 2016 | Created by the Department of Communication Studies at Colorado State University. |
| Active Vista International Human Rights Film Festival | Quezon City, Metro Manila | Philippines | 2005 | Takes place annually in September to coincide with the introduction of Marshal Law in the Philippines. Raises awareness to help spark the desire for change in the eyes of the public. |
| Addis International Film Festival | Addis Ababa | Ethiopia | 2007 | The festival focuses on human rights issues in Ethiopia and globally. It hopes to inspire future generations to be more critically engaged. |
| AfricanBamba Human Rights Film Festival | Thiaroye, Dakar | Senegal | 2012 | Works with local and international NGOs to provide free health consultations and to raise awareness about local social issues. |
| Bergen International Film Festival (BIFF) | Bergen | Norway | 2000 | The largest film festival in Norway features mainly documentary but also fiction films. Their human rights festival Checkpoint is featured during BIFF. |
| Censurados Film Festival | Lima | Peru | 2014 | Promotes itself as a meeting place for activists, a place to see films on human rights topics and films which have been censured. |
| Chesnok Human Rights Documentary Film Festival | Tiraspol | Moldova | 2016 | A travelling film festival within Moldova which presents feature and short human rights documentaries. The festival's goal is to engage the public on the human rights issues of the world. |
| Ciné Droit Libre | Ouagadougou | Burkina Faso | 2005 | Its points of focus are human rights and freedom of expression. Screens and distributes films which have been censored in order to activate audiences on human rights issues. |
| Ciné Droit Libre Abidjan | Abidjan | Ivory Coast | 2008 | Focuses on films from Africa which have been censored by showing them and distributing them. |
| Docudays UA International Human Rights Documentary Film Festival | Kyiv | Ukraine | 2003 | Promotes human rights in Ukraine and documentary filmmaking. |
| Document Human Rights Film Festival | Glasgow | Scotland | 2003 | Is a meeting place for documentary filmmakers from across the United Kingdom and focuses on showing human rights films largely ignored by mainstream media. |
| ENTRETODOS | São Paulo | Brazil | 2007 | An entry fee free short film human rights film festival. |
| Fast Forward Human Rights Film Festival | Podgorica | Montenegro | 2010 | Encourages the people of Montenegro to stand up for their rights and the rights of others. |
| Festival de Cine MÁS | Managua | Nicaragua | 2015 | Helps spread awareness about human rights to more people in Nicaragua through association with educational institutions in the country. |
| Festival de Cine y Derechos Humanos Donostia | San Sebastian | Spain | 2003 | This festival promotes human rights, respect and solidarity through fiction features, documentaries and short films. |
| Festival Del Cinema Dei Diritti Umani Di Napoli | Naples | Italy | 2008 | As a city which has been a crossing point for immigrants, Naples desires to promote itself through this festival as an integral meeting space for people from countries to the south fighting for democracy and freedom. |
| Festival des Libertés | Brussels | Belgium | | Through screening documentaries, and hosting events, the festival promotes freedom and universal democracy. |
| Festival du Film et Forum International sur les Droits Humains (FIFDH) | Geneva | Switzerland | 2003 | Coincides with the UN Human Rights Council Meeting in Geneva. |
| Festival Internacional de Cine Derechos Humanos (FICDH) | Buenos Aires | Argentina | 1997 | The festival's primary focus is the dictatorship in Argentina. Since 2004, under new leadership, immigration and Indigenous issues have also become a focus. |
| Festival Internacional de Cine de los Derechos Humanos “El séptimo ojo es tuyo” | Sucre | Bolivia | 2004 | A festival, cultural centre for study and film production in Bolivia. |
| FiSahara | Tindouf | Algeria | 2003 | The festival takes place in the Sahrawi refugee camps in Algeria. It organizes screenings, activities and workshops. |
| Free Zone Film Festival | Belgrade | Serbia | 2005 | Showcases films about human rights from around the world and raises awareness about the responsibility to protect others. |
| Freedom Film Festival | Petaling Jaya | Malaysia | 2003 | Brings filmmakers and activists together to see and listen to untold stories about human rights issues. The festival also includes a travelling festival. |
| HUMAN International Documentary Film Festival | Oslo | Norway | | A film festival and forum for professionals as well as students on documentary filmmaking as an agent for change. |
| Human Rights Arts and Film Festival (HRAFF) | | Australia | 2006 | This festival uses the language of the Universal Declaration of Human Rights to engage newcomers and those already knowledgeable on the topic. |
| Human Rights Watch International Film Festival | Manhattan, New York | United States | 1988 | The first human rights film festival to occur anywhere in the world. |
| Human Rights Film Festival: Inconvenient Films | Vilnius | Lithuania | 2007 | Through a focus on new documentary filmmakers, global human rights issues are related to those that are local to Lithuania. |
| Human Rights Nights (HRN) | Bologna | Italy | 2001 | Celebrates the risks taken by filmmakers to make the voices and pain of others known to a wider public. |
| HUMANS Fest - Festival Internacional de Cine y Derechos Humanos | Valencia | Spain | 2008 | The festival shows screenings in person and online, organizes activist projects and raises awareness for human rights related issues around the world. |
| International Human Rights Film Festival in Albania | Tirana | Albania | 2006 | Created by the Academy of Film and Multimedia Marubi in association with many non government organizations, it includes music performances, exhibitions as well as film screenings. The festival focuses on global human rights issues of interest to Albania. |
| Karama Beirut Human Rights Film Festival | Beirut | Lebanon | 2016 | The festival is run by the NGO Art Factory 961 and is an event for professionals, activists, and community members in the promotion of human rights through screenings, outreach programs and workshops. |
| Karama Human Rights Film Festival | Amman | Jordan | 2009 | Run by NGO Ma'mal 612 and in the wake of the issues facing the Arab region since 2010 this festival raises awareness about human rights issues through film, music education and art. They also help other festivals form through the Arab Network for Human Rights films. |
| Miradas Diversas - Festival Internacional de Cine de Derechos Humanos | Caracas | Venezuela | 2018 | Works with organizations to bring awareness about human rights issues to multiple cities outside of Caracas during the week of the festival. |
| MOVE IT! Film Festival for Human Rights and Development | Dresden | Germany | 2004 | The festival focuses on women and children's rights related films that have not yet been screened in Dresden. |
| Movies that Matter International | The Hague | Netherlands | 2006 | Originally, beginning in 1995, the Amsterdam branch of the Amnesty International Film Festival. Amnesty International is still the largest supporter of the festival. |
| Muestra de Cine Internacional Memoria Verdad Justicia | Guatemala-City | Guatemala | 2010 | This festival focuses on memory and brings audiences together to watch film that are not seen in the region. It especially looks for films which are from the region but have been taken away. They locate, try to acquire their rights and subtitle these films. |
| Muestra de Cine Social y Derechos Humanos (MUSOC) | Asturias | Spain | 2012 | This festival screens documentary, fiction and animation films from around the world to raise awareness on human rights topics. |
| Nepal Human Rights International Film Festival | Kathmandu | Nepal | 2010 | Film is in an important tool for this festival to reach people about human rights in communities who are marginalized and illiterate. To activate them to stand up for their rights. |
| Nuremberg International Human Rights Film Festival (NIHRFF) | Nuremberg | Germany | 1999 | Germany's largest human rights film festival. This festival focuses on art house films of exceptional quality with juries, prizes and a youth programme. |
| One World International Human Rights Documentary Film Festival | Prague | Czech Republic | 1999 | The largest human rights film festival in the world. |
| One World Slovakia | Bratislava | Slovakia | 1999 | This festival is an online and in person festival which shows documentary films from around the world on human rights issues. |
| Red Carpet Human Rights Film Festival | Gaza City | Palestine | 2015 | As the only human rights film festival in Palestine the festival focuses on human rights issues in both Palestine and around the world. It runs in collaboration with the Karma film festival in Jordan. |
| Seoul Human Rights Film Festival | Seoul | South Korea | 1996 | This festival shows films which have been censored, works to sustain engagement with human rights issues, and delivers a festival that is accessible for those with disabilities. |
| Tenemos que Ver | Montevideo | Uruguay | 2011 | By hosting workshops and educational screenings at schools this festival engages with the audience and community beyond the exceptional films screened at the festival. |
| Vermont International Film Festival | Vermont | United States | 1985 | As the oldest festival in Vermont, VIFF shows arthouse films aimed at both entertainment and engaging with the issues of the world. |
| Verzio International Human Rights Documentary Film Festival | Budapest | Hungary | 2004 | This festival is an event that includes Q&A sessions and workshops which engage community members, professionals and aspiring filmmakers on topics related to human rights. |
| WATCH DOCS Belarus Human Rights Film Festival | Minsk | Belarus | 2015 | Funded largely by crowdfunding and the support of WATCH DOCS Poland this festival shines light on human rights abuses while supporting Belarusian documentary filmmakers. |
| WATCH DOCS. Human Rights in Film International Film Festival | Warsaw | Poland | 2001 | This festival boasts an international jury, workshops, and online screening library for those who access it from Poland. It works with various leading NGOs and institutes to put on a festival that shows exceptional documentaries while maintaining a space for debate. |
