= Poverty in Yemen =

According to the United Nations, Yemen ranks 168th out of 177 countries on the human development index (HDI), a measure of life expectancy, education, and standard of living. Yemen has the lowest HDI rank among the Arab states. Several welfare programs are in place, but they have generally been considered inadequate to meet the needs of Yemen's impoverished citizens (estimated to exceed 45 percent of the total population).

The main social assistance program is the Social Welfare Fund, initially established to compensate for reductions in economic subsidies. This program provided 650,000 beneficiaries direct cash payments in 2005 capped at US$11 per month and lump-sum payments for emergencies. In July 2005, the government announced it would extend coverage to an additional 200,000 beneficiaries. The Social Development Fund and the Public Works Project were established almost 10 years prior with World Bank funds. These programs attempt to raise living standards through various community development, capacity-building, and micro-financing programs; it has been difficult, however, to obtain the necessary commercial bank credit to make these programs viable. In early 2005, Yemen's parliament adopted a government budget requiring that the government provide additional resources for social safety nets to lessen the impact of economic reforms that might result in higher consumer prices.

== See also ==
- Poverty by country
