= Hashem Ali =

Hashim Ali
- Born: Hashim Ali Abdulah Al Douilah; 1 January 1945; Hadramout of Yemen
- Died: 7 November 2009 (aged 64); Taiz, Yemen
- Known for: Painting
- Movement: Modernism

Hashem Ali (1945–2009) was an early plastic artist in Yemen.

== Background ==
After his birth in the village of (Duwailah) in Mukalla, his father took him to Indonesia. He lived there 13 years of his first years, where he studied in a Chinese school to the sixth primary. He then returned with his family to Hadramout. And then moved to Aden. Then to Taiz where he settled in Taiz and founded his own studio there. He made his studio open to all young talents, educated and trained until he died in 2009. Participated in many exhibitions inside and outside Yemen. One of the founders of the art movement in Yemen, he studied many plastic artists.

== Notable awards ==
- Order of Literature and Arts, First Class, 1989.
- Received the Golden Medal of Sana'a, First Class 1997.
- The Honorary Shield (Al-Saeed Foundation for Culture and Science) 2001.
- The Ministry of Culture awarded him the souvenir of Sana'a, the capital of Arab culture in 2004.
- (Hashim Ali) The new Fine Art Hall was named the cultural center in Sana'a as of 2004.
