= Yemen–European Union relations =

- European Union: Yemen

Yemen–European Union relations describe the diplomatic relationship between the Yemen and the nations and organizations that compose the European Union. Prior to Yemeni unification, the territory of the modern Republic of Yemen comprised North Yemen and South Yemen.

== History ==
In 1978 the European Commission began cooperation with Yemen and relations were formalised in 1984 through a Development Co-operation Agreement with North Yemen, which was extended in 1995 to cover the entire country following unification in 1990.

Following the Arab Spring and the departure of Yemeni President Ali Abdullah Saleh, the European Parliament urged the High Representative to reassess ties to Yemen. While Parliament were supportive of the uprising, the High Representative concentrated on organising evacuation of EU citizens due to fear of civil war.

== Trade and financial support ==
Yemen relied heavily on oil exports (90%). The EU is its second largest import partner, but only its fifth largest trading partner overall. In January 2025, the EU announced €95 million of humanitarian aid for North Africa and Yemen.

== Yemen's foreign relations with EU member states ==
- Austria
- Belgium
- Bulgaria
- Croatia
- Cyprus
- Czech Republic
- Denmark
- Estonia
- Finland
- France
- Germany
- Greece
- Hungary
- (Republic of Ireland) Ireland
- Italy
- Latvia
- Lithuania
- Luxembourg
- Malta
- Netherlands
- Poland
- Portugal
- Romania
- Slovakia
- Slovenia
- Spain
- Sweden

== See also ==
- Foreign relations of the European Union
- Foreign relations of Yemen
