= Somalis in Yemen =

- (Somalia) (Yemen)
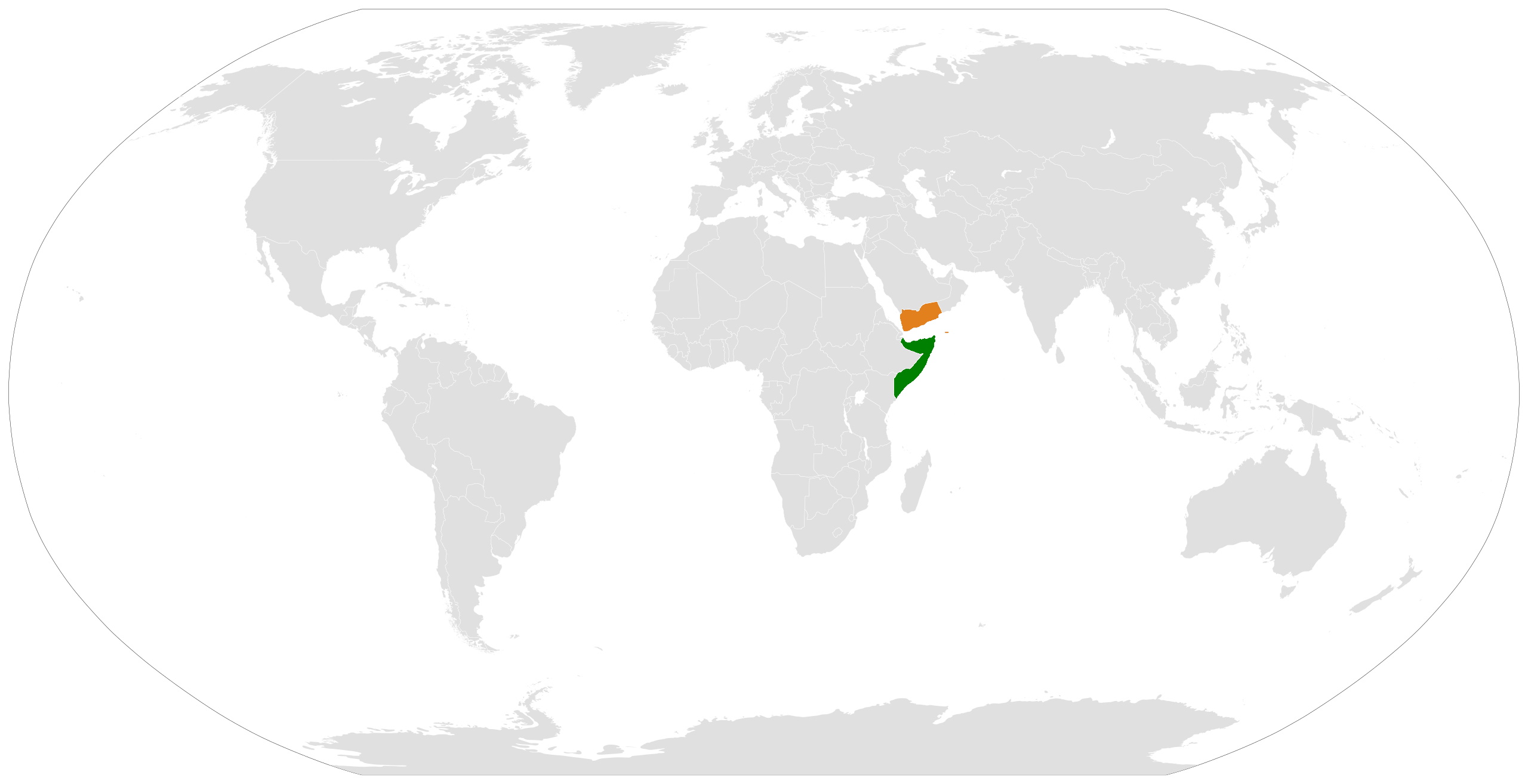

Total population
- 285,211 (41,171 refugees)

Regions with significant populations
- Aden, Sana'a, Ibb, Lahj Governorate

Languages
- Somali, Arabic

Religion
- Islam

Related ethnic groups
- Oromo, Afar, Saho, and other Cushitic-speaking peoples

Somalis in Yemen make up the historical Somali population in Yemen. Around 285,211 Somalis live in Yemen, of which 41,171 are refugees.

== History ==
Many Somalis fled to Yemen during the Somali Civil War.

== Demographics ==
There are around 285,211 Somalis in Yemen, mostly concentrated around Aden. There are also some on Lahij Gvernorate.

Many Somalis in Yemen now speak Arabic instead of their native Somali language due to language shift. But also due to the fact that there are no Somali teachers in the refugee camps or enough budget to allocate funds to teach the Somali language.

Many Somalis have returned back to their homeland deeming its safe enough to return. "The voluntary returns are part of UNHCR’s Assisted Spontaneous Return (ASR) programme". Since 2017 over 6,200 Somali refugees have returned home

== Conditions ==
In 2010, Reuters reported that poverty among Somali refugees in Yemen remains common. Following the outbreak of COVID-19 in 2020, the World Health Organization reported that migrant groups faced stigmatization as "transmitters of disease" after a Somali refugee was identified as the first case in the country.

=== Yemeni refugees in Somalia ===
Following the outbreak of the Yemeni civil war, some refugees from Yemen have moved to Somalia. In 2022, Anadolu Agency reported that many Yemeni refugees have felt welcomed by Somali society. As of late December 2021 there are 8,341 registered Yemeni refugees and asylum seekers in Somalia

== See also ==
- Somalia–Yemen relations
- Somali diaspora
- Immigration to Yemen
