= Immigration to Yemen =

Immigration to Yemen is regulated by the Passport and Immigration Department of Yemen.

== Regulation ==
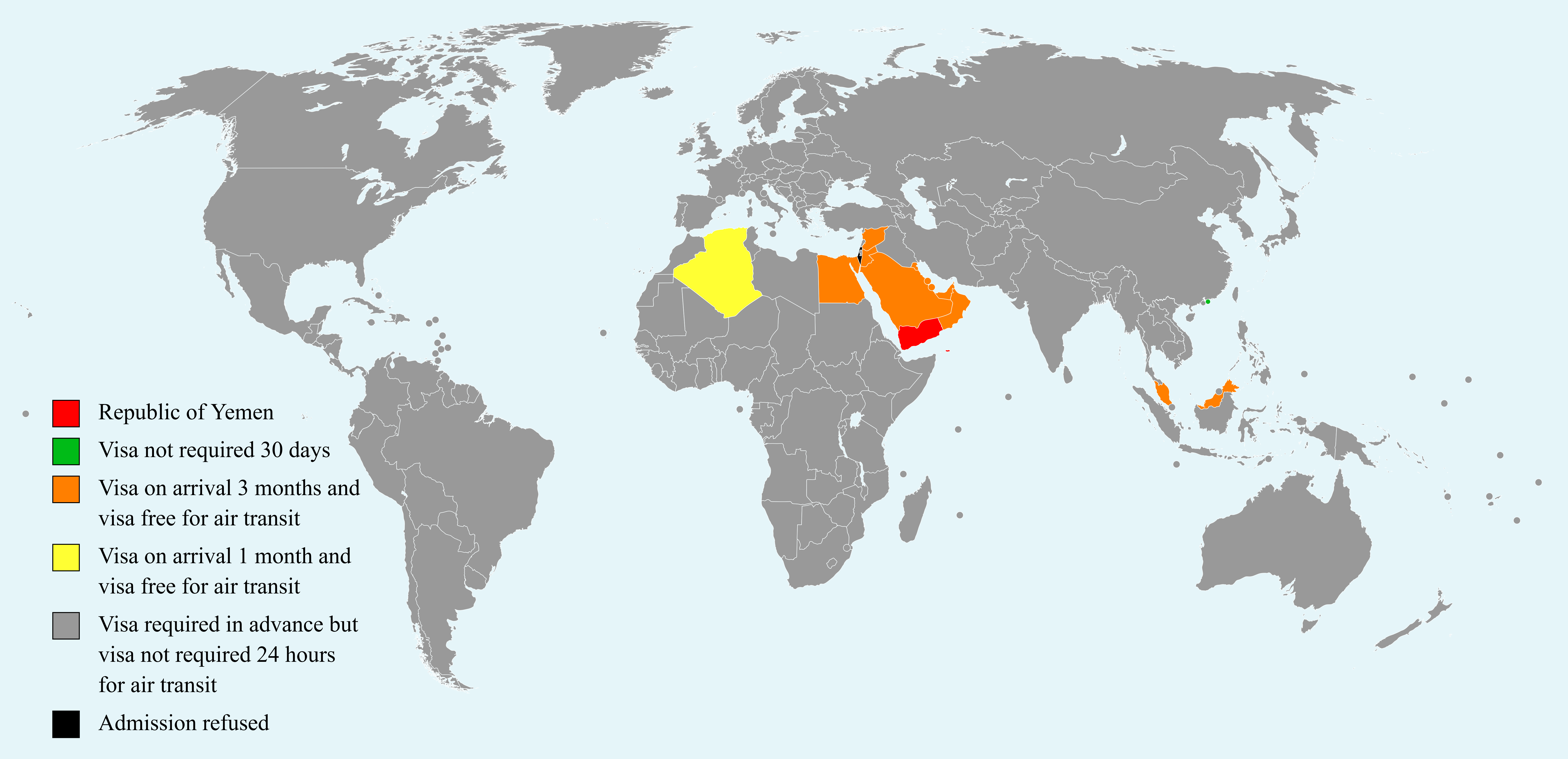
Visa policy of Yemen.

Visitors to Yemen must obtain a visa from one of the Yemeni diplomatic missions, unless they come from one of the visa countries whose citizens may obtain visa on arrival.

Until January 2010, Yemen had a visa on arrival policy for some 50 nations.

== Demographics ==
Tourism in Yemen is overseen by the Government of Yemen's Ministry of Tourism.

According to the World Bank, there were an estimated 1,174,000 international inbound tourists in Yemen in 2012. Additionally, the USCRI indicates that Yemen hosted a population of refugees and asylum seekers numbering around 124,600 in 2007.

== Citizenship ==
According to Article 44 of the national constitution, Yemeni nationality is regulated by the law. Citizenship may not be withdrawn unless it is in accordance to the law.

In addition, per Article 45 of the constitution, a citizen of Yemen cannot be extradited to a foreign authority.

== See also ==
- Demographics of Yemen
- Foreign relations of Yemen
- Yemeni passport
