= Iraq–Yemen relations =

- Iraq: Yemen

Diplomatic relations between the Republic of Yemen and the Republic of Iraq are old, religious and ethnic relations that began before the establishment of republics in the two countries.

Relations go back to almost a century, when Yemeni army officers were trained in Iraq, and have included various events that have perhaps strengthened the ties between the two, in particular the Gulf War and when the Arab Cooperation Council was formed, consisting of four countries, including Iraq and North Yemen.

Present-day Iraq and Yemen have historically had relatively limited bilateral relations. However, relations between Yemen’s former president, Ali Abdullah Saleh, and Iraq’s former president, Saddam Hussein, were very close, as Saleh supported Iraq in the Gulf War. Iraq has an embassy in Sana’a, and Yemen has an embassy in Baghdad.

== History ==
In 1930, a number of Yemeni army officers learned in Iraqi military institutes, including Colonel Ahmed bin Yahya Al-Thalaya. On February 16, 1989, Yemen, Jordan, Iraq, and Egypt signed an agreement in order to establish the Arab Cooperation Council in Baghdad. Iraq’s president, Saddam Hussein, and Yemeni president, Ali Abdullah Saleh were closely allied. Saleh opposed the US-led coalition in the Gulf War but did not fight against the coalition.

Despite these efforts to strengthen relations, the ongoing conflict in Yemen and the political instability in Iraq have presented challenges to the development of a more robust bilateral relationship. Furthermore, Houthi spokesman Mohamed Abdel Saleh claimed that Iraqi Prime Minister Haider al-Abadi recognised them as “representative of Yemen”. However, both countries have expressed a desire to continue working together to promote regional stability and cooperation.

In recent years, former Iraqi Prime Minister Haidar al-Abadi expressed sympathy for Yemen, stating he would “want to stop this conflict as soon as possible.” He has gone on to say that he doesn't think US-supported airstrikes in Yemen are helping the situation "at all," and Saudi Arabia should not be conducting them.

Iraq has perhaps been seen as a mediator for the Yemeni Civil War, as they have hosted five rounds of talks over the past year between Sunni-majority Saudi Arabia and Shia-majority Iran, aimed at restoring relations between the two. If this turned out successful, the two would be able to pressure Houthi militias in reaching a realistic political settlement.

In 2004, the UNHCR estimated that 100,000 Iraqis were living in Yemen.

In June 2024, during the Gaza war, the Yemeni Houthis in control of Sana'a and the Islamic Resistance in Iraq began launching joint military operations on Israel and ships in Haifa Port in support of Palestinians of Gaza Strip.

== Gulf War ==
During the Gulf War, Yemen officially condemned the US-led coalition's military intervention in the region and opposed the involvement of non-Arab countries. President Ali Abdullah Saleh also observed that intervention by a massive multinational force was liable to “destabilize the entire region. Yemen’s refusal to join the coalition caused the deepest plummet in the relations between the United States and Yemen since June 1967, but it also captured US attention. As a result, the Republic of Yemen has had to face the sudden suspension of Saudi, Kuwaiti and Iraqi aid, the embargo of Iraqi oil shipments, the collapse of tourism and the decline in regional commerce, which cost Yemen nearly $2 billion in 1990. Furthermore, the Kingdom of Saudi Arabia expelled over a million Yemenis as a result of Saleh favouring Iraq in the Gulf War.

== See also ==
- Foreign relations of Yemen
- Foreign relations of Iraq
- Iraqi invasion of Kuwait
