= Pakistanis in Yemen =

Community of the Pakistani diaspora

- (Pakistan) (Yemen)
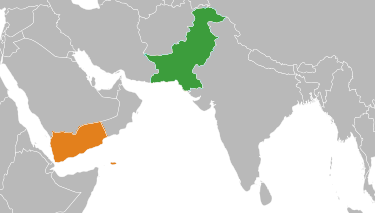

Total population
- 1,000

Regions with significant populations
- Sana'a · Aden · Mokallah

Languages
- Urdu · Punjabi · Arabic

Religion
- Islam

Pakistanis in Yemen comprise Pakistani people who live in Yemen and people born in Yemen of Pakistani descent. There are around 1,000 Pakistanis in Yemen while there are up to 110 Pakistani prisoners in Yemeni prisons for various offenses.

The Houthi rebels are reported to have Pakistani fighters in their ranks.

== Notable people ==
- Ammar al-Baluchi
- Samir Khan (1985 – 2011)
- Rizwan Khan

== See also ==
- Pakistan–Yemen relations
- Evacuation of Pakistani citizens during the Yemeni Civil War (2015)
- Yemenis in Pakistan
- Human trafficking in Yemen
- Pakistani diaspora
- Immigration to Yemen
