= Cooperation Council =

Cooperation Council may refer to:

- Arab Cooperation Council, an international economic organization
- Gulf Cooperation Council, a regional organization involving the six Persian Gulf Arab States
- Euro-Atlantic Partnership Council, a NATO organisation
- Pacific Economic Cooperation Council, a network of member committees composed of individuals and institutions
