= United Kingdom–Yemen relations =

- United Kingdom: Yemen

United Kingdom–Yemen relations have existed since the independence of South Yemen. The United Kingdom and Yemen have a long history of bilateral relations, dating back to the 20th century when the UK played a significant role in the region as a colonial power. The UK was a key influence on the modern state of Yemen, as it played a role in the creation of the independent South Yemen, which it had colonized previously. However, relations recently have been quite mixed, due to the United Kingdom's involvement in the Yemeni Civil War. Yemen has an embassy in London, and the United Kingdom has one consulate in Hodeidah and an embassy based in Sana'a, however, its operations have been suspended due to the Yemeni Civil War.

Relations are quite complex, including British colonialism, the Yemeni Civil War, geostrategy, and counter-terrorism. The United Kingdom is a longstanding donor to the humanitarian relief effort in Yemen and provides training to the Saudi and Yemeni forces in order to combat the Houthi rebels.

The United Kingdom has a non-resident ambassador in Muscat. Yemen has an embassy in London.

== History ==
=== 19th and 20th century ===
Yemenis arrived in the United Kingdom as early as 1860, making them the longest-established Arab community in the United Kingdom. Tensions after World War I led to Yemenis rioting in South Shields alongside others. As a result, many were deported back to Yemen, which perhaps was a great downfall in the relationship between the Yemenis and the United Kingdom.

Yemenis then began leaving the United Kingdom, possibly due to the reunification of Yemen, Saudi Arabia was normally the best destination for Yemenis trying to leave the United Kingdom. However, as a result of the Gulf War, Saudi Arabia expelled over a million Yemeni workers, sharply deteriorating Saudi-Yemeni relations. This consequently led to the United Kingdom receiving a large number of Yemenis from Saudi Arabia. Today, approximately 80,000 reside in the United Kingdom, with the majority living in Birmingham.

=== 21st century ===
Following 9/11, the United Kingdom provided Yemen with counter-terrorism training to deal with Al-Qaeda in the Arabian Peninsula, but instructors officially withdrew in 2015 when the British embassy had to close due to the war breaking out. Furthermore, Saudi and Western forces, including British forces have been accused of operating at an eastern airport in Yemen. When Britain's ambassador Michael Aron was repeatedly questioned over these allegations, he did not deny them, stating these forces were sent in order to “support efforts of fighting terrorism and smuggling.” These allegations have been confirmed, and the reason for the British Special Forces’ deployment in Eastern Yemen was to “track down the Houthi perpetrators of a tanker attack.”

Despite their long history, relations today have been quite tense. The United Kingdom has been supplying the Saudi Arabian-led intervention in Yemen with arms sales and technical assistance, alongside the United States. The United Kingdom has been accused for spending more money on arms for the Saudi-led coalition than humanitarian aid for Yemen and their inhabitants. Furthermore, many countries, including the United Kingdom, have implemented their foreign policy towards Yemen based on many factors, including Yemen's geostrategic location and proximity to the Bab el-Mandeb strait, which accounted for almost 10 percent of total sea-borne petroleum shipments in 2017.

Hamish Falconer, British under-secretary for the Middle East, underscored the UK's support for the Yemeni Coast Guard during an official tour of their headquarters in Aden in 2025, marking the first visit to Yemen by a UK minister since 2019.

== Economic relations ==
As of 2022, the UK exported goods to Yemen worth 48 million pounds. In return, the UK imported goods from Yemen worth 5 million pounds. This is a visible increase from 2021, where the UK exported goods to Yemen worth 23 million pounds, while importing 1 million pounds in return. Due to the civil war in Yemen, which has limited the country's trade and impacted its relations with other countries, it is the UK's joint 167th largest trading partner. This is due to the UK's financial sanctions placed on Yemen.

== See also ==
- Foreign relations of the United Kingdom
- Foreign relations of Yemen
