= Bangladesh–Yemen relations =

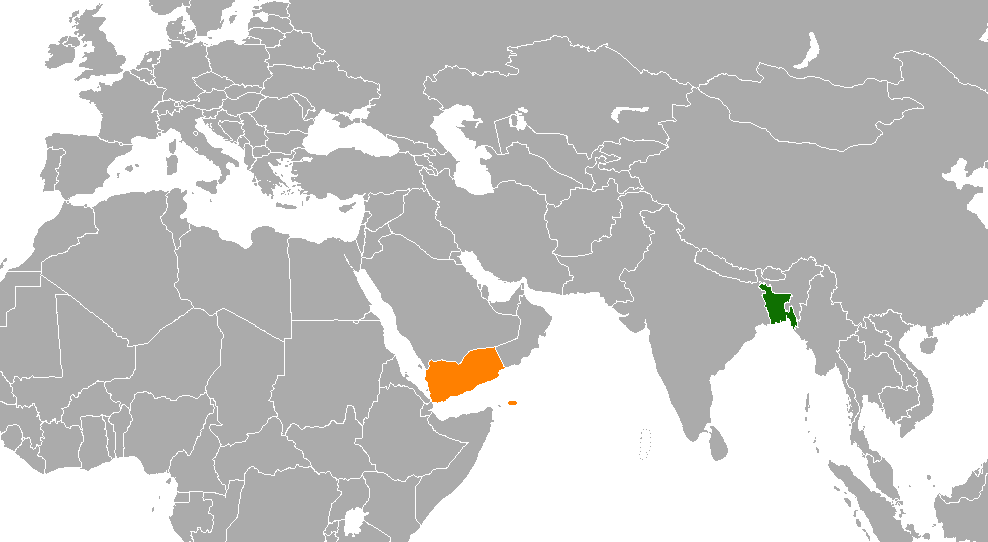

- Bangladesh: Yemen

Bangladesh–Yemen relations are the bilateral relations between Bangladesh and Yemen. In 2014 Mohammad Ashab Uddin was named Bangladeshi ambassador to Yemen.

== Recognition ==
South Yemen, today integrated in Yemen, recognized Bangladesh on June 15, 1971. South Yemen was the first Arab state to recognize Bangladesh (other Arab states had supported Pakistan in the 1971 war), and the support for Bangladeshi independence marked an emerging split between South Yemen and China. South Yemen also supported the membership of the emerging Bangladeshi state in the World Health Organization. Diplomatic relations Bangladesh and the Yemen Arab Republic were established in 1973 when North Yemen recognized Bangladesh. According to Sheikh Mujibur Rahman the opening of diplomatic relations between Bangladesh and the Yemen Arab Republic (as well as several other Arab states) was a result of the support of Bangladesh to the Arab cause in the 1973 Arab-Israeli war.

== 1975 coup ==
Following the coup d'état in Bangladesh in 1975, North Yemen was one of the first states to recognize the government of Khondaker Mostaq Ahmad.

== 1987 presidential visit ==
Bangladeshi president Hussain Muhammad Ershad visited North Yemen in July 1987, seeking to boost trade and cooperation. Two agreements on bilateral cooperation were signed during this visit. This was the first Bangladeshi presidential visit to North Yemen.

== Educational cooperation ==
The education sector has been identified as a potential field to expand bilateral cooperation between Bangladesh and Yemen. Both sides have expressed the need to hold educational exchange programs, especially in the fields of engineering and information technology.

== Economic cooperation ==
Economic ties between Bangladesh and Yemen increased in the 1990s, with surge in trade and labour migration.

Bangladesh and Yemen have expressed mutual interest to expand the bilateral trade and investments between the two countries. Bangladeshi pharmaceuticals, ceramic, melamine, jute and fabric, leather products etc. have been identified as promising industries with huge demand in the Yemeni market. In 2013, the Yemeni President Abd Rabbuh Mansur Hadi expressed his desire to have some patrol ships for Yemen Coast Guards built in the Bangladeshi shipyards. Yemen has proposed to sign an agreement on Trade and Commerce with Bangladesh. Besides, the need for exchanges of business delegations between the two countries has also been stressed.

== See also ==
- Foreign relations of Bangladesh
- Foreign relations of Yemen
