= Yemenis in Pakistan =

Community of the Yemeni diaspora

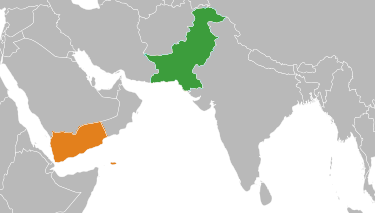

Total population
- 5,000 (2014)

Regions with significant populations
- Karachi; Islamabad

Languages
- Yemeni Arabic; Urdu

Religion
- Islam

Related ethnic groups
- Yemeni diaspora; Arabs in Pakistan

Yemenis in Pakistan are residents of Pakistan who are of Yemeni descent.

== Demographics ==
Over 5,000 expatriates from the Yemeni city of Aden reside in Karachi. There are also over a hundred Yemeni international students pursuing higher education in different universities in Pakistan. They include 40 Yemeni pupils studying on scholarships provided by the Government of Pakistan. In addition, some Yemenis in Pakistan are reported to have been militants operating for insurgent networks in the northwestern tribal areas on the Afghan border.

There is an embassy of Yemen in Islamabad which provides services to Yemeni citizens in Pakistan. The embassy along with the Yemeni community observes various national and cultural events such as Unity Day.

== Notable people ==
- Annie Khalid, singer and model

== See also ==
- Immigration to Pakistan
- Pakistanis in Yemen
- Pakistan–Yemen relations
- Yemeni diaspora
