= Indonesia–Yemen relations =

- Indonesia: Yemen

Indonesia–Yemen relations are current and historical bilateral relations between Indonesia and Yemen since 21 April 1962. Indonesia and Yemen shared similarity as the Muslim majority countries, Indonesia is the most populous Muslim country in the world, while Yemen is also a Muslim majority nation. Indonesia has an embassy in Sana'a, while Yemen has an embassy in Jakarta. Both the countries have many cultural proximities and similar view on international issues and these nations are members of the Non-Aligned Movement, Indian-Ocean Rim Association and Organisation of Islamic Cooperation (OIC).

History and the relations between Yemen and Indonesia goes back hundreds of years. One of the common theories of the spread of Islam in Indonesia are through the efforts of Arab (particularly Yemeni) merchants and tradesmen who settled within the region, the indigenous population would slowly convert to Islam through the missionary efforts of the merchants and the native Hindu-Buddhist kings would follow suit.

Many Arab Indonesians traces their ancestral origin to Yemen, particularly the Hadhramaut region, The Arabs have frequented the Indonesian archipelago as early as the 8th Century, and intermarried with the local population, creating a particularly large Arab population in the country. Some of the royal dynasties in Indonesian archipelago are founded by Arabs or of mixed Arab descent, the most notable being the Alkadrie Dynasty of the Sultanate of Pontianak, which was founded by an Arab Hadharem explorer.

== See also ==
- Azmatkhan
- Ba 'Alawi sada
- Foreign relations of Indonesia
- Foreign relations of Yemen
