= Italy–Yemen relations =

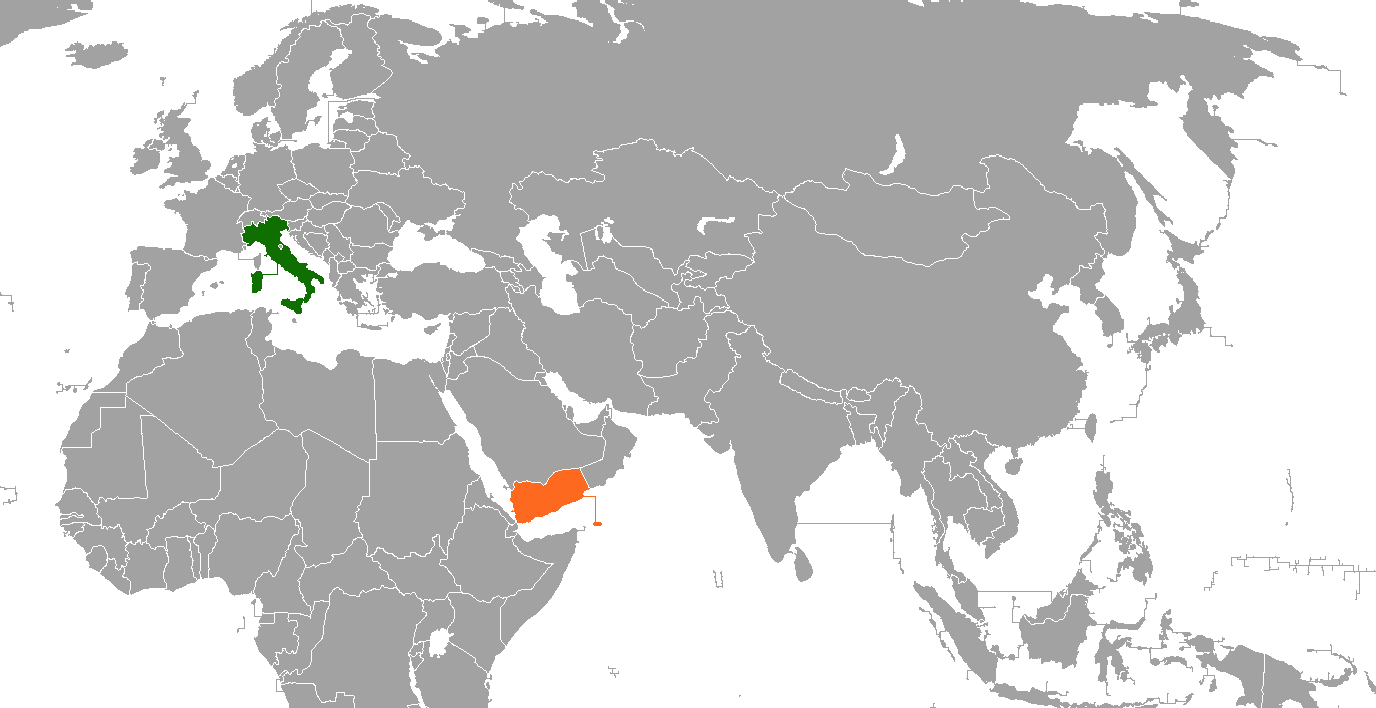
- Italy: Yemen

Italy–Yemen relations refers to the current and historical relationship between Italy and Yemen. Yemen has an embassy in Rome. Italy had an embassy in Sana'a, which was closed in 2015 due to concerns over security and the withdrawal of staff.

Asmahan Abdulhameed Al-Toqi is the current Ambassador of Yemen to Italy.

== History ==
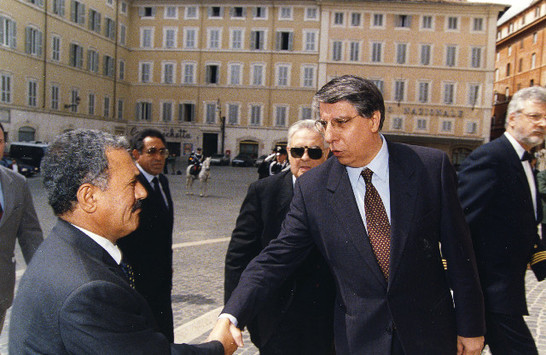
Saleh shaking hands with Carlo Giovanardi in 2000

Diplomatic relations between Italy and Yemen began on September 2, 1926, when the Italo-Yemeni Treaty was signed. This made Italy the first country formally to recognize Yemen's independence. This treaty granted Italy, then ruled by Benito Mussolini, control over the east coast of the Red Sea.

As part of Italian imperialism under fascism, Italy had some plans to conquer or at least transform Yemen into a Client state, as Mussolini wanted the Red Sea to be the new "Mare Nostrum" of the Italian Empire. So, it was very important that Southern Arabian territories (like the Kingdom of Yemen and British Aden) were integrated into Italy's Sphere of influence.

== See also ==
- Foreign relations of Italy
- Foreign relations of Yemen
- Yemen–European Union relations
