= Eritrea–Yemen relations =

- Eritrea: Yemen

Eritrea–Yemen relations refers to the current and historical relationship between Eritrea and Yemen. The states fought briefly over the Hanish Islands in the Red Sea in 1995. In 2004, Eritrean President Isaias Afewerki was invited to and visited Yemen for a two-day working visit. He was accompanied by a number of government ministers and high-ranking military personnel, including foreign minister Ali Said Abdella.

== Hanish Islands conflict ==
The Hanish Islands conflict was a dispute between the two countries over the island of Greater Hanish in the Red Sea, one of the largest in the Zukur-Hanish archipelago, which was disputed between Yemen and Eritrea. Fighting took place over three days from 15 December to 17 December 1995. It was an Eritrean military victory by the second day, and the Eritreans held the islands until 1998. In 1998, the Permanent Court of Arbitration determined that most of the archipelago belonged to Yemen.

== See also ==
- Foreign relations of Eritrea
- Foreign relations of Yemen
