= Germany–Yemen relations =

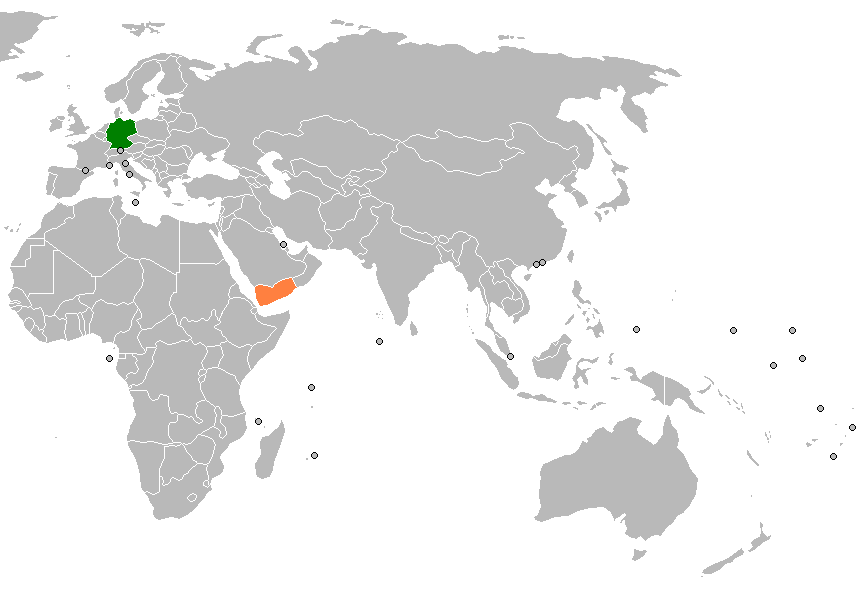

- Germany: Yemen

Germany–Yemen relations have existed since the 1960s. During the civil war in Yemen, the Federal Republic of Germany provided humanitarian aid to the country.

== History ==
As early as 1606, the lansquenet Hans Wild reached Yemen and later published reports of his experiences in the Islamic world. In the 18th and 19th centuries, German-speaking explorers such as Carsten Niebuhr, Ulrich Jasper Seetzen, Alfred von Kremer and Eduard Glaser traveled and explored the country. In the early 20th century, the German Empire unsuccessfully sought to lease a naval base in Al Hudaydah. As part of the Stotzingen Mission, Germany sought to establish a military intelligence station in Al Hudaydah during World War I, which also failed. In 1933 and 1935, the composer Hans Helfritz traveled to Yemen and made films on behalf of UFA. In doing so, he deliberately circumvented Joseph Goebbels' directive to portray foreign peoples as culturally inferior. The Mutawakkilite Kingdom of Yemen remained a neutral power during World War II.

In the postwar period, the FRG envoy in Cairo toured the city of Aden and British-occupied southern Yemen in 1953 with the German consul in Jeddah. Three years later, Muhammad al-Badr visited the GDR, and soon after the latter established a trade mission with consular authority in the Kingdom of Yemen (from 1962 on the Yemen Arab Republic or North Yemen). Diplomatic relations between the Federal Republic and the Yemen Arab Republic were established in 1962 and the FRG made significant contributions to the development of the hitherto isolated country, with German development workers, teachers, physicians and archaeologists coming to the country. Diplomatic relations with the People's Republic of Yemen or South Yemen were also established in 1967. In the same year, the ARD correspondent Walter Mechtel was killed in Aden. The GDR established close relations with the Socialist People's Republic of Yemen from 1969 and also established relations with the Yemen Arab Republic in 1972. The reunification of the two Yemeni states took place in 1990, almost in parallel with German reunification.

Due to the poor security situation in the country, the German Embassy in Sanaa had to be closed in 2015. The ensuing civil war led to foreign intervention in the country and a severe humanitarian crisis. German weapons were also used in the war, as German arms companies had supplied weapons to participants in the foreign coalition in Yemen, such as Saudi Arabia and the United Arab Emirates. In 2017, the German government under Angela Merkel offered to accept a mediation role between the warring parties. In 2019, members of the German Armed Forces participated in UN missions in Yemen.

== Economic relations ==
In 2013, Germany exported goods worth 227 million euros to Yemen and imported goods worth 4 million euros in return. With the start of the civil war in 2015, the exchange of goods between the two countries decreased. In 2021, the bilateral trade volume was around 180 million euros, placing Yemen 123rd in the ranking of Germany's trading partners.

There is a double taxation agreement between the two countries for the aviation sector (2007) and an investment protection agreement (2008). However, due to the difficult situation in Yemen, there has been little investment by German companies.

== Development cooperation ==
Germany has been providing development aid in Yemen since the 1960s. In 1983, the German Society for International Cooperation opened an office in Sanaa. Yemen-Kinderhilfe Aichach e. V. was founded in 2003. German development aid focuses on education and water supply. In 2021, the German government allocated 200 million euros to combat the humanitarian crisis and hunger in the country.

== Cultural relations ==
The German Archaeological Institute has been involved in the preservation of Yemen's cultural heritage and some Yemenis have studied in Germany. German culture and research has a good reputation in Yemen, however, cultural exchange is hampered by the poor security situation in Yemen.

The German-Yemeni Society has promoted cultural contact between the two societies since 1970.

== Migration ==
In 2021, just under 9,000 Yemenis lived in Germany, nearly 1,200 more than two years earlier. Well-known German Yemenis include Green Party politician Tarek Al-Wazir.

== Diplomatic missions ==
- Germany has an embassy in Sanaa. (operated from Amman since 2015).
- Yemen has an embassy in Berlin and a consulate general in Frankfurt.

== See also ==
- Foreign relations of Germany
- Foreign relations of Yemen
