= Pakistan–Yemen relations =

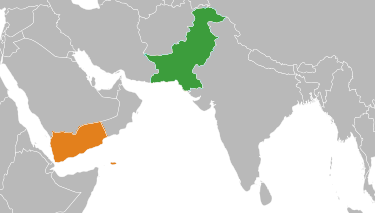
- Pakistan: Yemen

Pakistan and Yemen enjoy relations as both share bonds of religion, culture and values. Relations date back when both nations were part of trading routes of ancient times. Parts of the land that now constitutes Pakistan and the territory of Yemen were part of the Persian Empire, and later of Umayyad and Abbasid Caliphates. Both countries seek to further boost bilateral ties and cooperation, and Yemen has confirmed Pakistan is in support of resolving the crisis through means of dialogue.

== Yemeni civil war ==
Under Prime Minister Shehbaz Sharif, Pakistan voiced support for Saudi Arabia against the Houthis in the Yemeni civil war. Pakistani defense minister Khawaja Asif warned on 9 September that the Houthi attacks on Saudi Arabia could activate the pact. Pakistan said on 10 September that there were no talks regarding military actions, but that the country would act "when the time comes." A condemnation of the Houthi attacks was made by Pakistani Prime Minister Shehbaz Sharif on 13 September, the Saudi Press Agency reported.

== See also ==
- Pakistanis in Yemen
- Yemenis in Pakistan
- Foreign relations of Pakistan
- Foreign relations of Yemen
