= Arabs in Pakistan =

Ethnic Arabs residing in Pakistan

Regions with significant populations
- Azad Jammu & Kashmir, Balochistan, Gilgit-Baltistan, Islamabad, Khyber Pakhtunkhwa, Punjab, Sindh

Languages
- Arabic

Religion
- Islam (Sunni, Shia)

Arabs in Pakistan consist of a small community of foreign workers and students from the Arab world.

== Numbers ==
=== Egyptians ===
There were some 1,500 Egyptians living in Pakistan during the 1990s. Following the 1995 attack on the Egyptian embassy in Pakistan by Egyptian Islamic Jihad militants, the Egyptian government renewed its security focus and collaborated with the Pakistani government to remove any Egyptian nationals from the country who were found to be involved in militant activities. As a result, a significant number of Egyptian residents in Pakistan were forcibly expelled or subjected to stringent measures by the Pakistani government. An extradition treaty was signed between the two countries, ensuring that any wanted Egyptians apprehended in Pakistan could be more efficiently mainlined back to Cairo.

=== Emiratis ===
Emirati nationals and royalty periodically visit Pakistan for the purpose of hunting local animals, such as falcons (namely MacQueen's bustards). In the city of Rahim Yar Khan in Pakistani Punjab, the founding father of the United Arab Emirates, Sheikh Zayed, built his own summer palace and an airport for his personal use whenever he visited Pakistan for hunting and recreation. The tradition has been revived by many other royal figures, amid rage by ecologists over the declining population of falcons and other wildlife.

=== Jordanians ===
The Jordanian diaspora in Pakistan mainly consists of international students.

=== Syrians ===
There are approximately 200 Syrian Arabs in Pakistan, many of whom are also students enrolled in Pakistani institutions. In May 2011, Syrian expatriates were seen protesting outside the Syrian embassy in Islamabad and condemning Bashar Al-Assad, the president of Syria from 2000 until 2024, amid nationwide protests in Syria.

=== Palestinians ===
There were around 300 Palestinians in Pakistan as of 2023, according to Palestinian ambassador, Ahmed Jawad A.A. Rabei.

== See also ==
- Arab–Pakistan relations
- Arab diaspora
- Yemenis in Pakistan
- Omanis in Pakistan
- Lebanese in Pakistan
- Bahrainis in Pakistan
- Kuwaitis in Pakistan
- Qataris in Pakistan
- Algerians in Pakistan
