= Foreign relations of Yemen =

The foreign relations of Yemen are the relationships and policies that Yemen maintains with other countries. It is a member of the United Nations, the Arab League, and the Organisation of Islamic Cooperation. Yemen participates in the nonaligned movement. The Republic of Yemen accepted responsibility for all treaties and debts of its predecessors, the YAR and the PDRY. Additionally, Yemen acceded to the Nuclear Non-Proliferation Treaty and has stressed the need to render the Middle East region free of nuclear and other weapons of mass destruction.

== History ==
=== North Yemen ===
The geography and ruling Imams of North Yemen kept the country isolated from foreign influence before 1962. During the 1920s, the government of Yemen forged relations with the Italian government under Mussolini, which led to the Italo-Yemeni Treaty on September 2, 1926. This gave the Sanaa government diplomatic support vis-a-vis the Saudi government, which had aggressive designs on Yemeni territory. The country's relations with Saudi Arabia were defined by the Treaty of Taif in 1934 which delineated the northernmost part of the border between the two kingdoms and set the framework for commerce and other interactions. The Taif Agreement has been renewed periodically in 20-year increments, and its validity was reaffirmed in 1995. Relations with the British colonial authorities in Aden and the south were usually tense.

The Soviet and Communist Chinese Aid Missions established in 1958 and 1959 were the first important non-Muslim presence in North Yemen. Following the North Yemen civil war, the Yemen Arab Republic became closely allied with and heavily dependent upon Egypt. Saudi Arabia aided the royalists in their attempt to defeat the Republicans and did not recognize the Yemen Arab Republic until 1970. Subsequently, Saudi Arabia provided Yemen with substantial budgetary and project support. At the same time, Saudi Arabia maintained direct contact with Yemeni tribes, which sometimes strained its official relations with the Yemeni government. Hundreds of thousands of Yemenis found employment in Saudi Arabia during the late 1970s and 1980s.

Ali Abdullah Saleh's foreign policy as the then-president of North Yemen was characterized by the principles of "positive neutrality" and Arab unity. Under Saleh, Yemen cultivated close ties with Saudi Arabia and other pro-West states in the region. He also purchased military equipment from the United States and expanded economic relations with the West. At the same time, Saleh also tried to maintain friendly relations with the then-Soviet Union (which broke apart in 1991). In October 1984, he renewed the treaty of Friendship and Cooperation that was originally signed in 1964 by San'a and Moscow.

In February 1989, North Yemen joined Iraq, Jordan, and Egypt informing the Arab Cooperation Council (ACC), an organization created partly in response to the founding of the Gulf Cooperation Council and intended to foster closer economic cooperation and integration among its members. After unification, the Republic of Yemen was accepted as a member of the ACC in place of its YAR predecessor. In the wake of the Persian Gulf crisis, the ACC has remained inactive.

=== South Yemen ===
British authorities left South Yemen in November 1967 in the wake of an intense resistance campaign. The People's Democratic Republic of Yemen, the successor to British colonial rule, had diplomatic relations with many nations, but its major links were with the Soviet Union and other Communist countries. Relations between it and the conservative Arab states of the Arabian Peninsula were strained. There were military clashes with Saudi Arabia in 1969 and 1973, and the PDRY provided active support for the Dhofar Rebellion against the Sultanate of Oman. The PDRY was the only Arab state to vote against admitting new Arab states from the Persian Gulf area to the United Nations and the Arab League. The PDRY provided sanctuary and material support to various international terrorist groups.

=== Unified Yemen ===
The Persian Gulf crisis dramatically affected Yemen's foreign relations. As a member of the UN Security Council (UNSC) for 1990 and 1991, Yemen abstained from several UNSC resolutions concerning Iraq and Kuwait and voted against the "use of force resolution". Western and Persian Gulf Arab states reacted by curtailing or canceling aid programs and diplomatic contacts. At least 850,000 Yemenis returned from Saudi Arabia and the Persian Gulf.

After the liberation of Kuwait, Yemen continued to maintain high-level contacts with Iraq. This hampered its efforts to rejoin the Arab mainstream and to mend fences with its immediate neighbors. In 1993, Yemen launched an unsuccessful diplomatic offensive to restore relations with its Persian Gulf neighbors. Some of its aggrieved neighbors actively aided the South during the 1994 civil war. Since the end of that conflict, tangible progress has been made on the diplomatic front in restoring normal relations with Yemen's neighbors. The Omani-Yemeni border has been officially demarcated. In the summer of 2000, Yemen and Saudi Arabia signed an International Border Treaty settling a 50-year-old dispute over the location of the border between the two countries. Yemen settled its dispute with Eritrea over the Hanish Islands in 1998.

== Diplomatic relations ==
List of countries which Yemen maintains diplomatic relations with:

#	Country	Date
1	Italy	2 September 1926
2	Ethiopia	22 March 1935
3	France	1 June 1942
4	Turkey	4 March 1946
5	United States	4 March 1946
6	Egypt	11 April 1946
7	United Kingdom	20 January 1951
8	Pakistan	4 February 1952
9	Lebanon	1953
10	Russia	31 October 1955
11	Sudan	21 April 1956
12	Czech Republic	3 September 1956
13	China	24 September 1956
14	Saudi Arabia	21 June 1957
15	Romania	17 December 1957
16	Poland	21 December 1957
17	Serbia	28 December 1957
18	Hungary	21 March 1959
19	Libya	22 August 1960
20	Somalia	18 December 1960
21	Iraq	7 March 1961
22	Norway	23 March 1961
23	Jordan	17 April 1961
24	India	15 March 1962
25	Indonesia	21 April 1962
26	Bulgaria	12 October 1962
27	Germany	24 October 1962
28	North Korea	9 March 1963
29	Vietnam	16 October 1963
30	Algeria	22 December 1964
31	Syria	23 May 1965
32	Cambodia	19 March 1968
33	Spain	24 September 1968
34	Austria	11 July 1969
35	Kuwait	19 March 1970
36	Kenya	15 August 1970
37	Mongolia	28 August 1970
38	Japan	22 September 1970
39	Sweden	29 September 1970
40	Chad	10 November 1970
41	Afghanistan	11 March 1971
—	Iran (suspended)	May 1971
42	Netherlands	5 October 1971
43	Belgium	8 November 1971
44	Switzerland	23 February 1972
45	Tanzania	April 1972
46	Cuba	4 May 1972
47	Bahrain	13 May 1972
48	Qatar	20 May 1972
49	United Arab Emirates	23 June 1973
50	Uganda	17 December 1973
51	Argentina	14 March 1974
52	Oman	12 May 1974
53	Portugal	18 April 1975
54	Denmark	1 May 1975
55	Mexico	5 August 1975
56	Canada	30 December 1975
57	Republic of the Congo	25 March 1976
58	Mauritius	March 1976
59	Laos	26 July 1976
60	Senegal	1976
61	Malta	24 February 1977
62	Philippines	4 May 1977
63	Angola	2 November 1977
64	Madagascar	31 December 1977
65	Finland	1 April 1978
66	Albania	May 1978
67	Mali	April 1979
68	Nigeria	12 May 1979
69	Jamaica	12 September 1979
70	Sri Lanka	September 1979
71	Luxembourg	10 December 1979
72	Djibouti	13 March 1980
73	Guyana	14 June 1980
74	Greece	5 December 1980
75	Australia	20 December 1980
76	Mauritania	19 February 1983
77	Nicaragua	21 February 1983
78	Singapore	8 March 1983
79	Bangladesh	21 March 1983
80	Thailand	5 April 1983
81	Iceland	20 July 1983
82	Cyprus	7 November 1983
83	Maldives	1 November 1984
84	Brunei	28 December 1984
85	Niger	4 January 1985
86	Comoros	6 January 1985
87	Gambia	28 March 1985
88	Brazil	7 May 1985
89	Zimbabwe	15 May 1985
90	Gabon	21 August 1985
91	South Korea	22 August 1985
92	Nepal	25 December 1985
93	Malaysia	7 April 1986
94	Colombia	3 October 1988
95	Morocco	21 February 1989
96	Bolivia	30 June 1989
97	Burkina Faso	25 January 1990
98	Namibia	26 November 1990
99	Latvia	13 February 1992
100	Azerbaijan	25 February 1992
101	Ukraine	21 April 1992
102	Lithuania	22 May 1992
103	Uzbekistan	25 May 1992
104	Slovakia	1 January 1993
105	Croatia	17 January 1993
106	Eritrea	23 May 1993
107	Moldova	27 January 1995
108	Turkmenistan	27 February 1995
109	Armenia	26 May 1995
110	Belarus	7 August 1995
111	Georgia	5 September 1995
112	Slovenia	12 October 1995
113	Ghana	30 November 1995
114	Bosnia and Herzegovina	19 December 1995
115	South Africa	3 January 1996
116	Tajikistan	25 February 1997
117	Kyrgyzstan	20 May 1997
118	Kazakhstan	9 December 1997
119	North Macedonia	6 October 1998
—	Holy See	13 October 1998
120	Ireland	25 July 2000
121	San Marino	22 February 2005
122	Costa Rica	4 September 2007
123	Zambia	22 November 2007
124	Dominican Republic	24 September 2009
125	Eswatini	21 October 2009
—	Kosovo	11 June 2013
126	Montenegro	27 September 2013
127	Benin	24 February 2014
128	Fiji	6 June 2014
129	New Zealand	2 May 2018
—	State of Palestine	Unknown
130	Seychelles	Unknown
131	Sierra Leone	Unknown
132	Tunisia	Unknown

== Africa ==
Country	Formal Relations Began	Notes
Djibouti	13 March 1980	See Djibouti – Yemen relations Both countries established diplomatic relation on 13 March 1980. Relations between Yemen and Djibouti are good, and cooperation takes place on many levels. A causeway between the two countries has been proposed.
Eritrea	23 May 1993	See Eritrea–Yemen relations Both countries established diplomatic relations on 23 May 1993 when Mr. Ahmed Abdella al Basha presented his credentials as the Yemeni Ambassador to President of Eritrea Issaias Afwerki. In 1995, there was a war between Yemen and Eritrea over the Hanish islands. Yemen was deemed to have most of the island group in 1998.
Somalia	18 December 1960	See Somalia–Yemen relations Following the outbreak of the civil war in Somalia in the 1990s, the Yemeni authorities maintained relations with Somalia's newly established Transitional National Government and its successor the Transitional Federal Government. The subsequent establishment of the Federal Government of Somalia in August 2012 was also welcomed by the Yemeni authorities, who re-affirmed Yemen's continued support for Somalia's government, its territorial integrity and sovereignty. Additionally, Somalia maintains an embassy in Yemen, with the diplomatic mission led by Ambassador Ismail Qassim Naji. Yemen also has an embassy in Mogadishu. Both nations are also members of the Arab League.
Sudan	21 April 1956	As of 2011, relations between Yemen and Sudan were not particularly strong, but they took on added importance after Yemen, Sudan, and Ethiopia developed an alliance late in 2003. The leaders of the three countries subsequently met frequently; the focus of their concern was often Eritrea. This alliance took an interesting twist at the end of 2004, when Yemeni president Ali Abdallah Salih offered to mediate differences between Sudan and Eritrea. As Sudan–Eritrea relations improved, the tripartite alliance with Ethiopia became dormant. The heads of government of Sudan, Yemen, Ethiopia, and Somalia did meet in Addis Ababa early in 2007, where they focused on the situation in Somalia. Sudan and Yemen also signed 14 cooperative agreements in mid-2007. As of early 2011, Sudan–Yemen relations were cordial but less significant than they had been several years before.

== Americas ==
Country	Formal Relations Began	Notes
United States	4 March 1946	See United States-Yemen relations Embassy of Yemen in Washington, D.C. Traditionally, Yemen's relations with the United States have been tepid, as the lack of strong military-to-military ties, commercial relations, and support of Yemeni President Ali Abdullah Saleh has hindered the development of strong bilateral ties. During the early years of the George W. Bush administration, relations improved under the rubric of the war on terror, though Yemen's lax policy toward wanted terrorists has stalled additional American support.

== Asia ==
Country	Formal Relations Began	Notes
Bangladesh	21 March 1983	See Bangladesh–Yemen relations Both countries established diplomatic relations on 21 March 1983. South Yemen was the first Arab state to recognize Bangladesh (other Arab states had supported Pakistan in the 1971 war), and the support for Bangladeshi independence marked an emerging split between South Yemen and China.
China	24 September 1956	See China–Yemen relations China and the Kingdom of Yemen established diplomatic relations at ministerial level on September 24, 1956, and upgraded bilateral relations to ambassadorial level on February 13, 1963. China established ambassadorial-level diplomatic relations with the Democratic People's Republic of Yemen on January 31, 1968. After Yemen was united, China and Yemen set September 24, 1956 as the date of the establishment of bilateral diplomatic relations. The two countries signed a treaty of friendship in 1958, with an agreement to cooperate in commercial, technical and cultural development.: China has an embassy in Sanaa.; Yemen has an embassy in Beijing.
India	15 March 1962	See India–Yemen relations Diplomatic relations between these countries were established on 15 March 1962. Relations continue to be in good shape notwithstanding India's close partnership with Saudi Arabia or Yemen's close ties with Pakistan.: India has an embassy in Sanaa.; Yemen has an embassy in New Delhi.
Indonesia	21 April 1962	See Indonesia-Yemen relations Both countries established diplomatic relations on 21 April 1962. Indonesia and Yemen shared similarity as the Muslim majority countries, Indonesia is the most popular Muslim country in the world, while Yemen also a Muslim majority nation. Indonesia has an embassy in Sanaa, while Yemen has an embassy in Jakarta. Both the countries have many cultural proximities and similar view on international issues.
Iran	May 1971	See Iran-Yemen relations Following the first two decades of the Islamic Revolution, ties between Tehran and Sanaa were never strong, but in recent years the two countries have attempted to settle their differences. One sign of this came on December 2, 2003, when the Yemeni foreign ministry announced that "Yemen welcomes Iran's request to participate in the Arab League as an observer member." However, relations have also been tense in recent years, particularly for the alleged Iranian support to Houthi rebels in Yemen, as part of the Shia insurgency in Yemen.
Iraq	7 March 1961	See Iraq–Yemen relations Relations between Yemen's former president, Ali Abdullah Saleh, and Iraq's former president, Saddam Hussein, were very close, as Saleh supported Iraq in the Gulf War.: Iraq has an embassy in Sanaa.; Yemen has an embassy in Baghdad.
Israel		See Israel–Yemen relations There are no diplomatic relations that exist between Israel and Yemen and relations between the two countries are very tense. Yemen refuses the admission of people with an Israeli passport or any passport with an Israeli stamp, and the country is defined as an "enemy state" by Israeli law. Notwithstanding the hostility between the two countries, approximately 435,000 Jews of Yemenite origin reside in Israel.
Malaysia	7 April 1986	See Malaysia–Yemen relations Both countries established diplomatic relations on 7 April 1986. The relations between the two countries can be traced back on the 15th century, with many Hadhrami people playing an important role during the Islamisation of the Malay people. This also proved with the current culture of Malaysian Muslim in the present day resembles an Arab culture. Currently, both countries in the process to enhance bilateral trades. In 2013, the bilateral trade stood over U$200 million with the major import from Yemen such as seafood products, coffee, honey, leather and fruits while the export from Malaysia are the cooking oil which Malaysia consider as the biggest producers and exporters to Yemen and also to the Middle East.Both countries also has signed a joint commission and promote bilateral relations in higher education. Since the outbreak of the Yemeni Civil War in 2015, Malaysia was added into the coalition led by Saudi Arabia to deter Houthis, though Malaysian involvement is minimal. There has been criticism over Malaysia's involvement in the war.: Malaysia formerly had an embassy in Sanaa, of which its operations had been relocated to Muscat, Oman (due to the Yemeni Civil War).; Yemen has an embassy in Kuala Lumpur.
Oman		See Oman–Yemen relations Oman and Yemen are generally enjoying good relations. The two countries share a border. Both Oman and Yemen were part of the Persian Empire, and later of Umayyad and Abbasid Caliphates. Yemen has an embassy in Muscat. Oman is represented in Yemen through its embassy in Sanaa.
Pakistan	4 February 1952	See Pakistan–Yemen relations Both countries established diplomatic relations on 4 February 1952. Relations date back when both nations were part of trading routes of ancient times. Parts of the land that now constitutes Pakistan and the territory of Yemen were part of the Persian Empire, and later of Umayyad and Abbasid Caliphates. Pakistan has an embassy in Sanaa. Many Pakistanis worked in Yemen.
Saudi Arabia	21 June 1957	See Saudi Arabia–Yemen relations Both countries established diplomatic relations on 21 June 1957 when the Government of Saudi Arabia is establishing a Legation in Yemen and appointed Abdul Rahman Abikan as its first Minister of Saudi Arabia to Yemen. The two countries at one time did enjoy good relations and closely cooperated in military, economic and cultural issues. Now because of the ongoing Yemeni Civil War and the realignments of power in the Middle East with the emergence of al-Qaeda and the radicalization of some factions of Islam, Saudi Arabia has led a military intervention into Yemen.: Saudi Arabia has an embassy in Sanaa.; Yemen has an embassy in Riyadh.
Turkey		See Turkey–Yemen relations Turkey and Yemen have a very long and deep historical ties, spanned from the Ottoman Empire to the modern era. However, their relationship is mostly very complicated with both the Ottoman occupation and Yemeni rebellion against the Turks.: Turkey has an embassy in Sanaa, but it closed down in 2015, after the outbreak of Yemeni Civil War.; Yemen has an embassy in Ankara.
United Arab Emirates	1971	See United Arab Emirates-Yemen relations The UAE and Yemen have a complex and strained relationship, as the UAE has played a significant role in regional politics in Yemen, and has at various points been an adversary of the country, as the UAE's involvement in Yemen, for example the United Arab Emirates takeover of Socotra, and its support for the Southern Transitional Council, a secessionist organization in Southern Yemen, has been a source of tension between the two countries, and has contributed to the ongoing conflict and humanitarian crisis in the country. Furthermore, the UAE has been involved in other efforts in Yemen that have been controversial. The country has been accused of backing local militias and separatist groups that have sought to gain more autonomy or independence from the central government. Some critics have accused the UAE of using these groups to further its own interests in the region, rather than working towards a broader peace and stability in Yemen.

== Europe ==
Country	Formal Relations Began	Notes
Italy		See Italy-Yemen relations Diplomatic relations between Italy and Yemen began on September 2, 1926. The signing of the Italo-Yemeni Treaty under which Italy was granted the right of control over the east coast of the Red Sea was described as a friendship treaty. Italy was in this era ruled by Benito Mussolini, who had arrested the reins of power in 1922, and his policy was based on conquest and expansion.: Yemen has an embassy in Rome.; Italy has an embassy in Sanaa.
Russia	31 October 1955	See Russia-Yemen relations Both countries established diplomatic relations on 31 October 1955. Russia and Yemen enjoy both warm and friendly relations that goes back to more than a century. Russia has supported both the Yemen Arab Republic and the People's Democratic Republic of Yemen on several occasions and established close relations with them. After Yemeni unification, both countries maintain close ties.
United Kingdom	24 October 1951	See United Kingdom–Yemen relations Yemen established diplomatic relations with the United Kingdom on 24 October 1951.: Yemen maintains an embassy in London.; The United Kingdom is accredited to Yemen through its embassy in Sanaa.; The UK governed the southern Yemen from 1837 to 1967, when it achieved full independence as South Yemen. Both countries share common membership of the World Trade Organization. Bilaterally the two countries have a Development Partnership, and an Investment Agreement.

== International organization membership ==
Yemen is a member of the United Nations (UN) and the following UN affiliates and specialized agencies:

- Food and Agriculture Organization
- International Civil Aviation Organization
- International Fund for Agricultural Development
- International Labour Organization
- International Maritime Organization
- International Telecommunication Union
- UN Conference on Trade and Development
- UN Educational, Scientific and Cultural Organization
- UN High Commissioner for Refugees
- UN Industrial Development Organization
- Universal Postal Union
- World Health Organization

Yemen is also a member of the following organizations:

- Arab Fund for Economic and Social Development
- Arab Monetary Fund
- Council of Arab Economic Unity
- Group of 77
- International Atomic Energy Agency
- International Bank for Reconstruction and Development
- International Civil Aviation Organization
- International Confederation of Free Trade Unions
- International Criminal Court (signatory)
- International Criminal Police Organization
- International Federation of Red Cross and Red Crescent Societies
- International Finance Corporation
- International Monetary Fund
- Islamic Development Bank
- League of Arab States
- Multilateral Investment Guarantee Agency
- Organisation for the Prohibition of Chemical Weapons
- Organisation of Islamic Cooperation
- World Intellectual Property Organization
- World Meteorological Organization
- World Customs Organization

Yemen was granted observer status at the World Trade Organization (WTO) in 1999 and in 2002 and 2003 submitted necessary documentation for full membership. The WTO working party on Yemen met in 2004 and twice thereafter to discuss Yemen's accession; negotiations are expected to take several years.

=== Relations with the Gulf Cooperation Council ===
Yemen desires to join the 24-year-old Gulf Cooperation Council (GCC), a sub-regional organization which groups Saudi Arabia, Kuwait, Bahrain, Qatar, the United Arab Emirates, and Oman in an economic and security alliance. GCC members have traditionally opposed accession of additional states. Currently, Yemen has partial observer status on some GCC committees, and observers believe that full membership is unlikely. Others assert that it is in the GCC's interest to assist Yemen and prevent it from becoming a failed state, lest its instability spread to neighboring Gulf countries. This has helped Yemen greatly. In November 2006, an international donors' conference was convened in London to raise funds for Yemen's development. Yemen received pledges totaling $4.7 billion, which are to be disbursed over four years (2007–2010) and represent over 85% of the government's estimated external financing needs. Much of these pledges came from Yemen's wealthy Arab neighbors.

The impediments to full GCC membership are steep. Reportedly, Kuwait, still bitter over Yemen's support for Saddam Hussein during the first Gulf War, has blocked further discussion of membership. Meanwhile, Yemen needs to export thousands of its workers each year to the Gulf in order to alleviate economic burdens at home. Foreign remittances are, aside from oil exports, Yemen's primary source of hard currency.

== Arab–Israeli conflict ==
Yemen has usually followed mainstream Arab positions on Arab–Israel issues, and its geographic distance from the conflict and lack of political clout make it a minor player in the peace process. Yemen has not established any bilateral mechanism for diplomatic or commercial contacts with Israel. The Yemeni Jewish community (300 members) continues to dwindle, as many of its members emigrated to Israel decades ago. On December 11, 2008, Moshe Nahari, a Jewish teacher, was murdered in a market in Raidah, home to one of the last Jewish communities in Yemen. After the attack, President Saleh pledged to relocate Yemeni Jews to the capital.

Yemen supports the Arab Peace Initiative, which calls for Israel's full withdrawal from all occupied territories and the establishment of a Palestinian state in the West Bank and Gaza Strip in exchange for full normalization of relations with all Arab states in the region. In the spring of 2008, President Saleh attempted to broker a reconciliation agreement between the competing Palestinian factions Hamas and Fatah. During a March meeting in Sanaa, Palestinian representatives from both groups signed a declaration (the Sanaa Declaration) calling for the creation of a national unity government, but the talks fell apart over the issue of Hamas's role in a unified Palestinian Authority.

== Major international treaties ==
Yemen is a signatory to various international agreements on agricultural commodities, commerce, defense, economic and technical cooperation, finance, and postal matters. Yemen is a Non-Annex I country under the United Nations Framework Convention on Climate Change. Yemen is not a signatory to the Kyoto Protocol but has acceded to it, which has the same legal effect as ratification. Yemen is a signatory to the Nuclear Non-Proliferation Treaty, is a party to the Biological Weapons Convention, and has signed and ratified the Chemical Weapons Convention. Yemen is also a party to environmental conventions on Biodiversity, Desertification, Environmental Modification, Hazardous Wastes, Law of the Sea, and Ozone Layer Protection.

== 2010 embassy closures ==
In late December 2009, the U.S. Embassy asked Americans in Yemen to keep watch for any suspicious terrorist activity following a terrorist incident on board a flight to the US that was linked to Yemen. On January 3, 2010, following intelligence and threats from al-Qaeda, the U.S. embassy in Sanaa was closed. A statement issued on the embassy's website said: "The US Embassy in Sanaa is closed today, in response to ongoing threats by Al-Qaeda in the Arabian Peninsula (AQAP) to attack American interests in Yemen". Al Jazeera reported that the closure of the embassy can mean only that "they believe al-Qaeda threat is very serious". No reopening date was given.

On the same day, the United Kingdom withdrew their presence in the country for similar purposes. The following day, France closed its embassy. Although the French Embassy was closed, staff remained inside. The French foreign ministry issued a statement saying, "Our ambassador decided on January 3 not to authorise any public access to the diplomatic mission until further notice." At the Italian Embassy, only those with prior appointments were allowed to enter. Ambassador Mario Boffo noted, though, that "if things remain as they are, then tomorrow or the day after we will return to normality." The embassy of the Czech Republic closed the visa and consular departments "amid fears of terrorist attacks." Japan, South Korea, Spain and Germany also made changes to their security arrangements and embassy accessibility. In addition to extra security at embassies, Yemen increased security at Sanaa International Airport.

According to the BBC, Yemeni media say the embassy closures come after "six trucks full of weapons and explosives entered the capital, and the security forces lost track of the vehicles." Trucks driven by militants, previously under security surveillance, had entered Sanaa and lost the surveillance at that point.

The French, UK, and US embassies later reopened the following day.

== 2015 embassy closures ==
Following the Houthi takeover in Yemen, many nations closed their embassies. France, United Kingdom, and United States closed their embassies on 11 February 2015, Germany, Italy, and Saudi Arabia closed their embassies on 13 February, Spain, Turkey, and United Arab Emirates closed their embassies on 14 February, Japan closed its embassy on 16 February, and Egypt closed its embassy on 23 February.

== See also ==
- List of diplomatic missions in Yemen
- List of diplomatic missions of Yemen
- Visa requirements for Yemeni citizens
