= Turkey–Yemen relations =

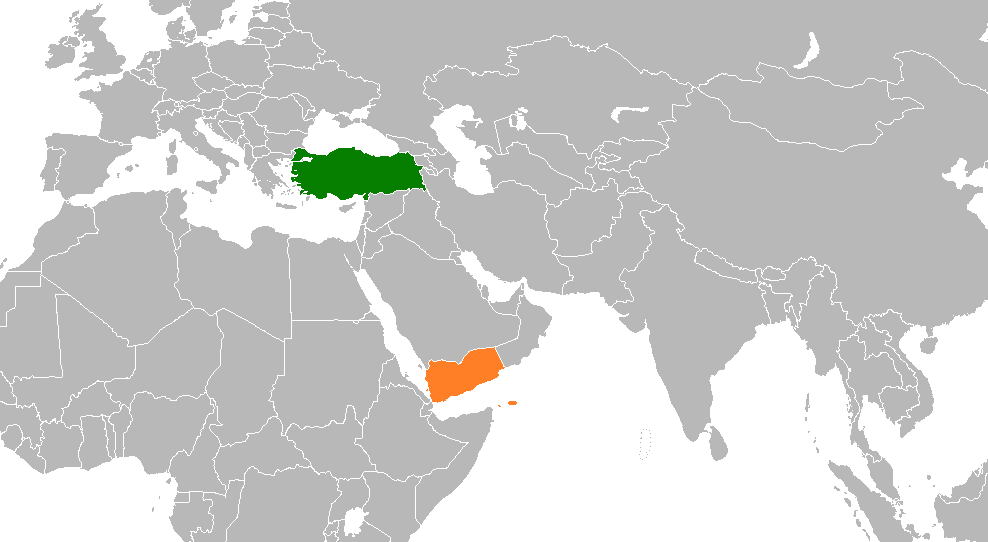
- Turkey: Yemen

Turkey and Yemen have very long and deep historical ties, spanned from the Ottoman Empire to the modern era. However, their relationship is mostly very complicated with both the Ottoman occupation and Yemeni rebellion against the Turks. Turkey had an embassy in Sana'a, but it closed down in 2015, after the outbreak of Yemeni Civil War. Yemen has an embassy in Ankara.

== History ==
=== Yemen under Ottoman Empire ===
The Ottomans began their expansion in Arabia at 16th century and had reached its peak of expansion by entering Yemen. After a number of conflicts between the Turks and Zaydis, the Ottomans effectively conquered Yemen and put it into control. However, anti-Ottoman unrest soon erupted in Yemen and the Ottomans would be soon expelled from the country a century later. Nonetheless, war continued when Al-Mu'ayyad Muhammad, who expelled the Turks, led an army to conquer Mecca. His expedition was a complete disaster as the Ottomans defeated the Zaydis in the city. However, after the war, the Ottomans didn't return to Yemen for two centuries.

At 19th century however, the Ottomans would manage to return to Yemen, and due to the Zaydis' disunity, the Ottomans would be able to put Yemen into its domain for another century. However, widespread corruption and ongoing rebellion against the Turks by Yemeni tribes had costed economic drains for the Ottoman Empire. Nonetheless, the Ottomans were able to keep Yemen until the end of World War I.

=== Modern Yemen ===
Relationship between newly established Turkish Republic with North Yemen and South Yemen were little, as Turkey was more concerned over their own neighboring situation instead. Their modern relations with Yemen only started at 1990, when two Yemens united as one country. During Yemeni War of 1994, Turkey portrayed as a neutral and even attempted to settle peace between. After that, the relations between Yemen and Turkey are neglected due to internal conflicts within Yemen and lack of interest from Turkey to Yemen.

=== Yemeni Civil War since 2014 ===
In the conflict of Yemen, Turkey initially took a pro-Yemeni government stance, supporting globally-recognized legitimate Yemeni government against the Houthis, but has not made any serious military intervention against the Houthis. In 2018, Turkey expressed concerns and wary over the UAE's intervention in Socotra. In 2019, Yemeni Foreign Minister, Khalid Al-Yamani, praised relations with Turkey as deep and historic.

In October 2019, President Recep Tayyip Erdogan and Foreign Minister Mevlüt Çavuşoğlu criticized the Saudi intervention in Yemen, drawing a rebuke from the Yemeni government, which described their remarks as "provocative".

=== 2023 Turkey–Syria earthquake ===
Yemeni embassy in Turkey donated 17 million Turkish liras (approximately $900,000) for humanitarian aid to earthquake victims in Turkey and Syria as a return to Turkey for being a mediator in the Yemeni peace talks with legitimate Yemeni government and Houthi rebels.

== See also ==
- Foreign relations of Turkey
- Foreign relations of Yemen
