= List of diplomatic missions of Yemen =

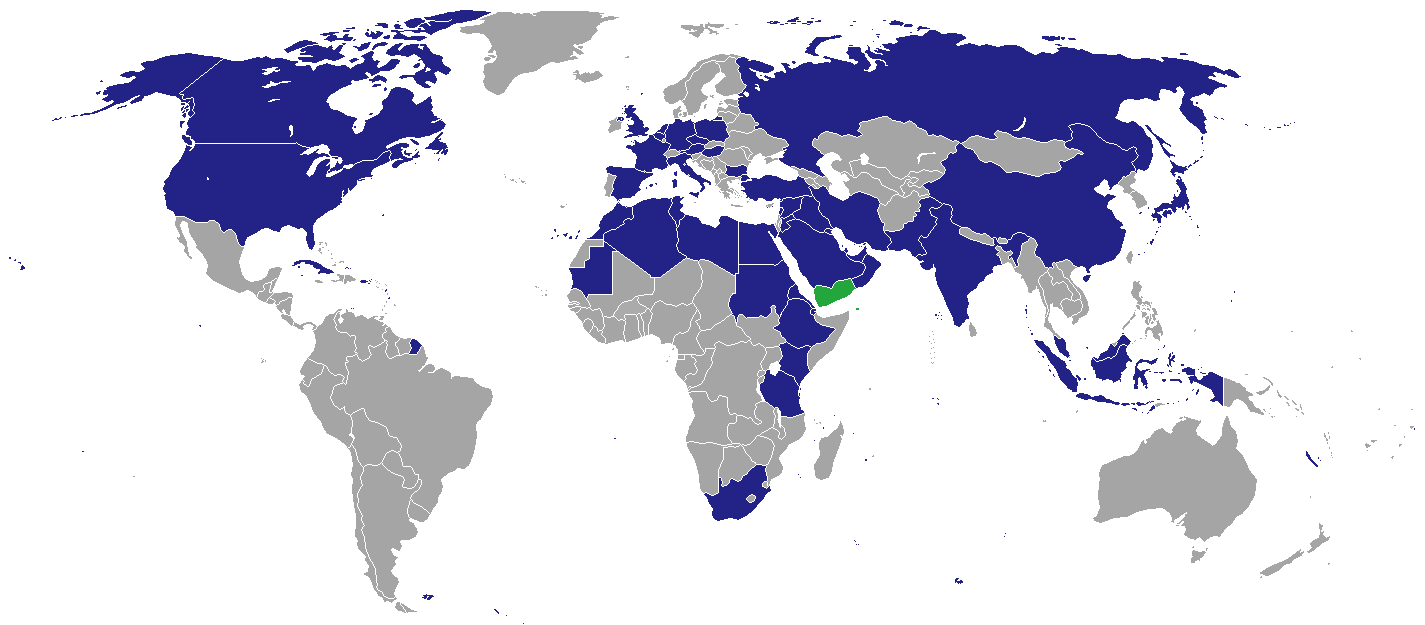
Map of Yemeni diplomatic missions

This is a list of diplomatic missions of Yemen, excluding honorary consulates.

== Current missions ==
=== Africa ===
Host country	Host city	Mission	Concurrent accreditation	Ref.
Algeria	Algiers	Embassy		
Djibouti	Djibouti City	Embassy		
Egypt	Cairo	Embassy	Countries: Comoros	
Eritrea	Asmara	Embassy		
Ethiopia	Addis Ababa	Embassy	Countries: Angola; Congo-Brazzaville; Madagascar; Mauritius; Mozambique; Namibia; Uganda; Zambia; Zimbabwe	
Kenya	Nairobi	Embassy	International Organizations: United Nations; United Nations Environment Programme; United Nations Human Settlements Programme	
Libya	Tripoli	Embassy	Countries: Chad; Malta	
Mauritania	Nouakchott	Embassy	Countries: Senegal; Mali; Niger	
Morocco	Rabat	Embassy		
South Africa	Pretoria	Embassy		
Somalia	Mogadishu	Embassy		
Sudan	Khartoum	Embassy	Countries: Congo-Kinshasa; Ghana; Nigeria	
Tanzania	Dar es Salaam	Embassy		
Tunisia	Tunis	Embassy		

=== Americas ===
Host country	Host city	Mission	Concurrent accreditation	Ref.
Canada	Ottawa	Embassy		
Cuba	Havana	Embassy	Countries: Brazil; Colombia; Costa Rica; Dominican Republic; Nicaragua; Venezuela	
United States	Washington, D.C.	Embassy	Countries: Argentina; Mexico; International Organizations: Organization of American States (Note: Accredited as an observer mission.)	

=== Asia ===
Host country	Host city	Mission	Concurrent accreditation	Ref.
Bahrain	Manama	Embassy		
China	Beijing	Embassy	Countries: North Korea	
India	New Delhi	Embassy	Countries: Bangladesh; Nepal; Sri Lanka	
India	Mumbai	Consulate-General	Countries: Bangladesh; Nepal; Sri Lanka	
Indonesia	Jakarta	Embassy	Countries: Australia; Brunei; Singapore; International Organizations: Association of Southeast Asian Nations	
Iran	Tehran	Embassy (Note: Nominated by the Houthi movement.)		
Iraq	Baghdad	Embassy		
Japan	Tokyo	Embassy	Countries: South Korea	
Jordan	Amman	Embassy		
Kuwait	Kuwait City	Embassy		
Lebanon	Beirut	Embassy	Countries: Cyprus	
Malaysia	Kuala Lumpur	Embassy	Countries: Cambodia; Philippines; Thailand; Vietnam	
Oman	Muscat	Embassy		
Pakistan	Islamabad	Embassy	Countries: Afghanistan; Kazakhstan; Kyrgyzstan; Maldives	
Qatar	Doha	Embassy		
Saudi Arabia	Riyadh	Embassy	International Organizations: Organisation of Islamic Cooperation	
Saudi Arabia	Jeddah	Consulate-General	International Organizations: Organisation of Islamic Cooperation	
Syria	Damascus	Embassy		
Turkey	Ankara	Embassy	Countries: Azerbaijan	
Turkey	Istanbul	Consulate-General	Countries: Azerbaijan	
United Arab Emirates	Abu Dhabi	Embassy		
United Arab Emirates	Dubai	Consulate-General		

=== Europe ===
Host country	Host city	Mission	Concurrent accreditation	Ref.
Austria	Vienna	Embassy	Countries: Croatia; Slovakia; Slovenia; International Organizations: United Nations	
Belgium	Brussels	Embassy	Countries: Luxembourg; International Organizations: European Union	
Bulgaria	Sofia	Embassy		
Czechia	Prague	Embassy		
France	Paris	Embassy	Countries: Portugal	
Germany	Berlin	Embassy	Countries: Bosnia and Herzegovina; Denmark; Finland; Holy See	
Germany	Frankfurt	Consulate-General	Countries: Bosnia and Herzegovina; Denmark; Finland; Holy See	
Hungary	Budapest	Embassy		
Italy	Rome	Embassy	Countries: Albania; Greece; San Marino; Serbia	
Netherlands	The Hague	Embassy	Countries: Norway; Sweden; International Organizations: Organisation for the Prohibition of Chemical Weapons	
Poland	Warsaw	Embassy	Countries: Ukraine	
Russia	Moscow	Embassy	Countries: Belarus; Moldova; Uzbekistan	
Spain	Madrid	Embassy		
United Kingdom	London	Embassy	Countries: Ireland	

=== Multilateral organisations ===
Organization	Host city	Host country	Mission	Concurrent accreditation	Ref.
Arab League	Cairo	Egypt	Permanent Mission		
United Nations	New York City	United States	Permanent Mission		
United Nations	Geneva	Switzerland	Permanent Mission	Countries: Switzerland	
UNESCO	Paris	France	Delegation		

== Gallery ==
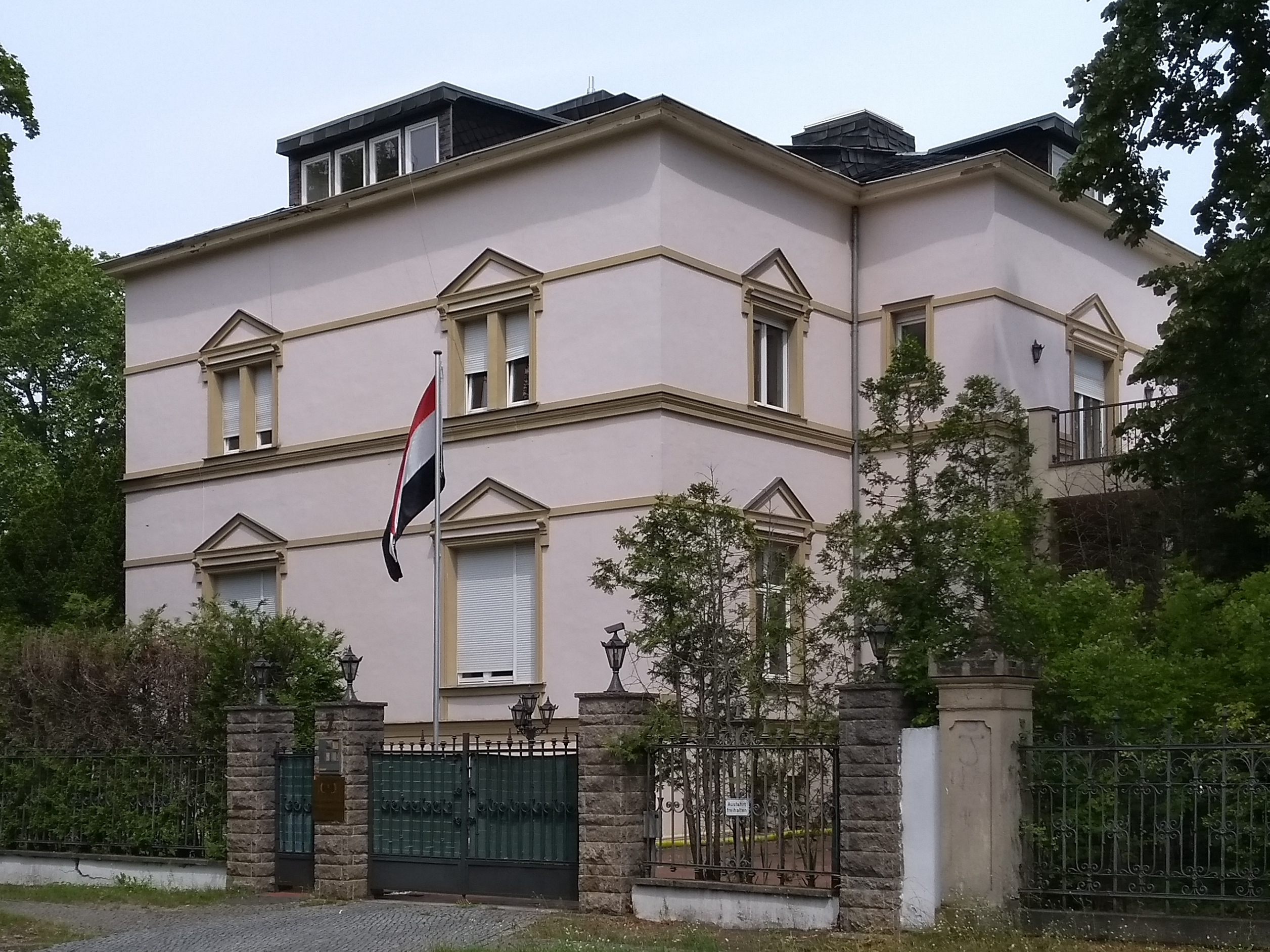
Embassy in Berlin

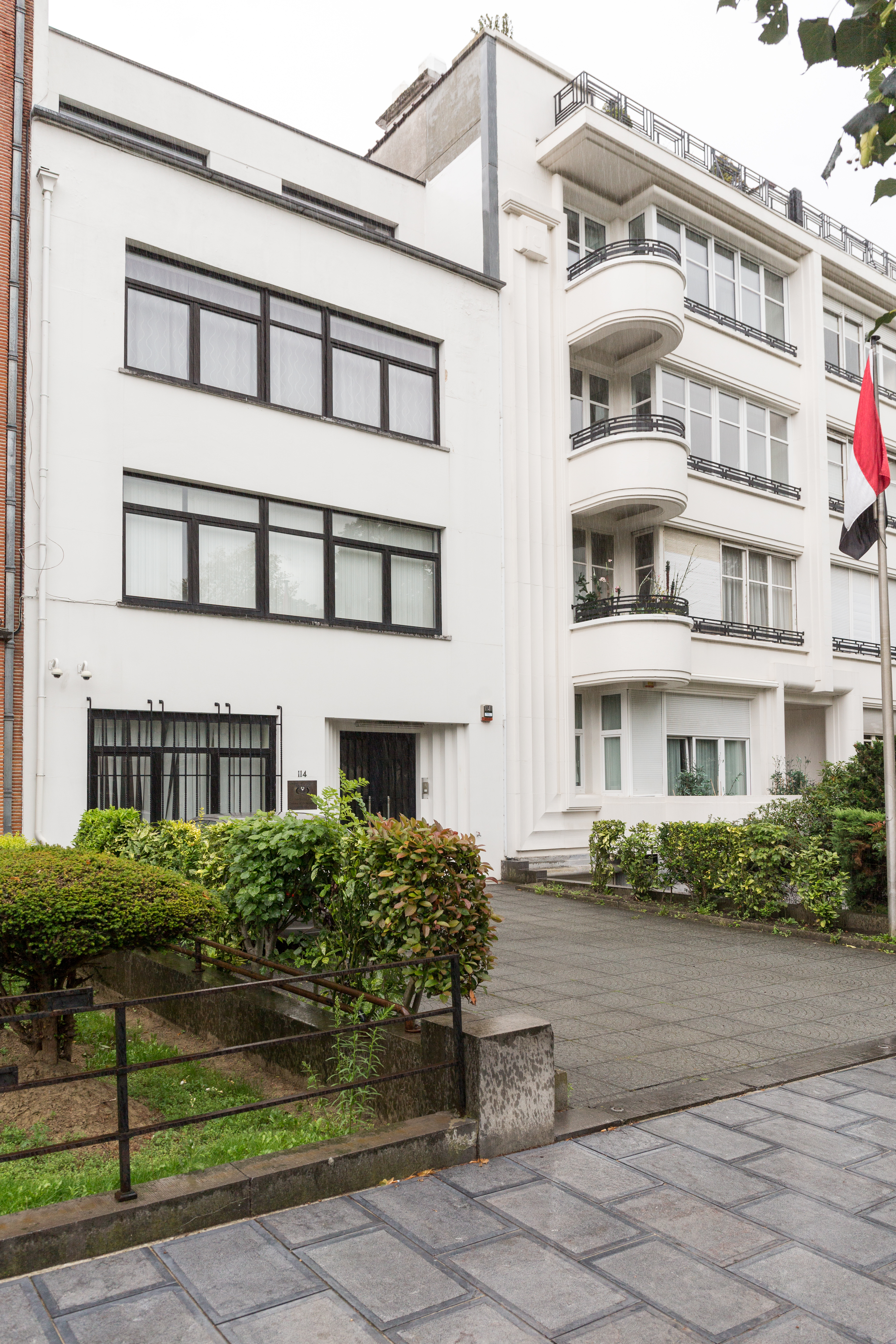
Embassy in Brussels

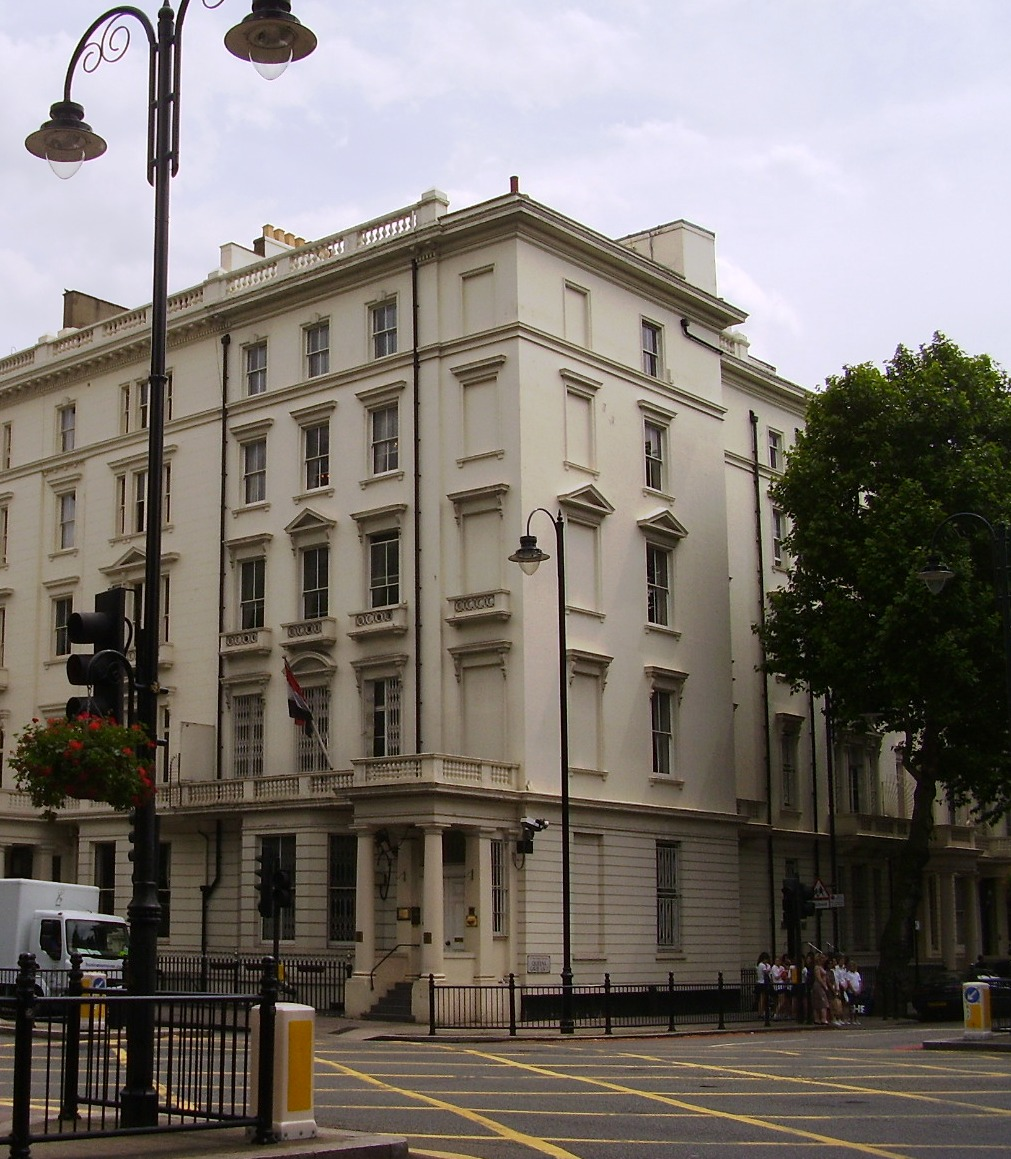
Embassy in London

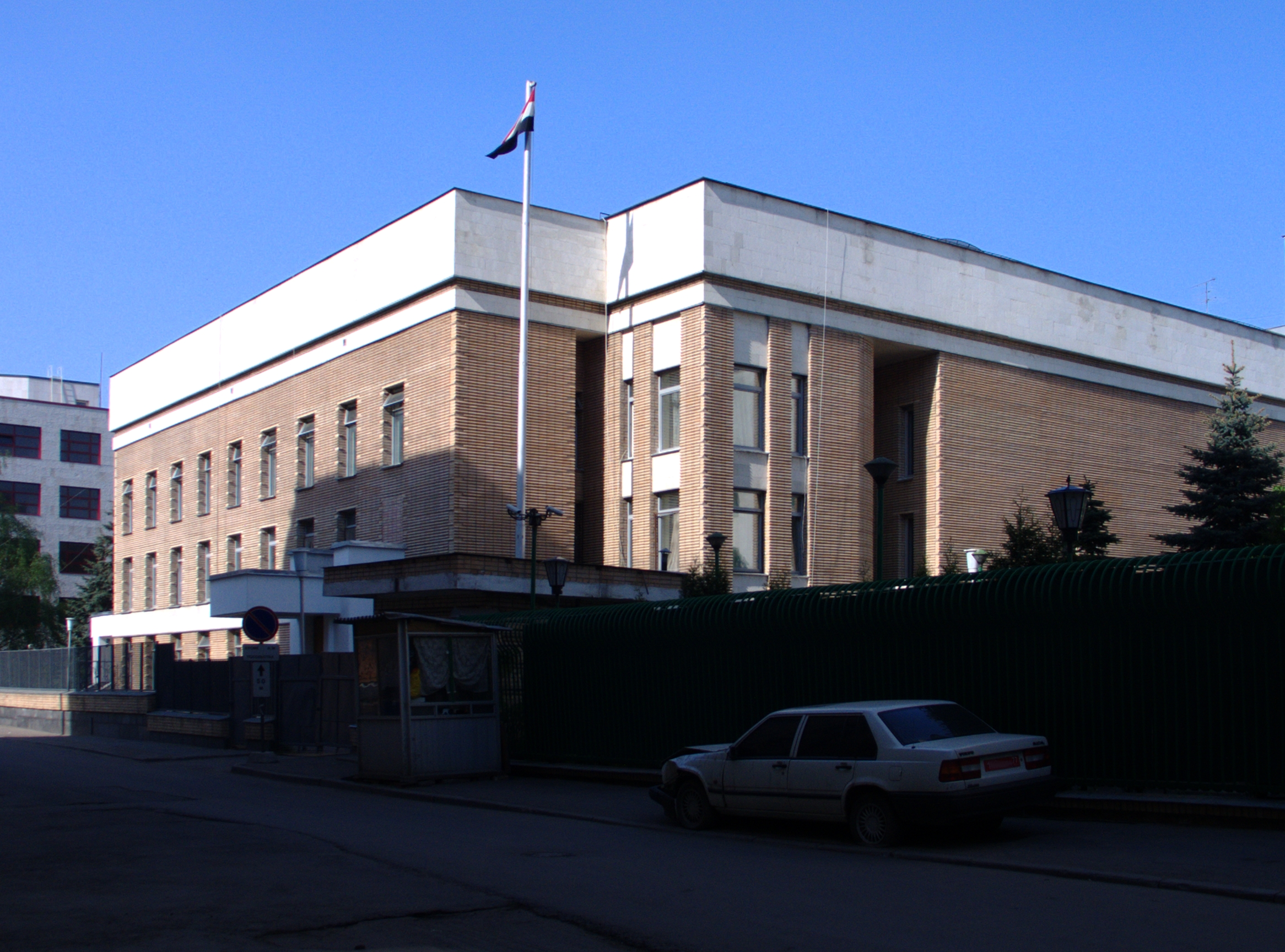
Embassy in Moscow

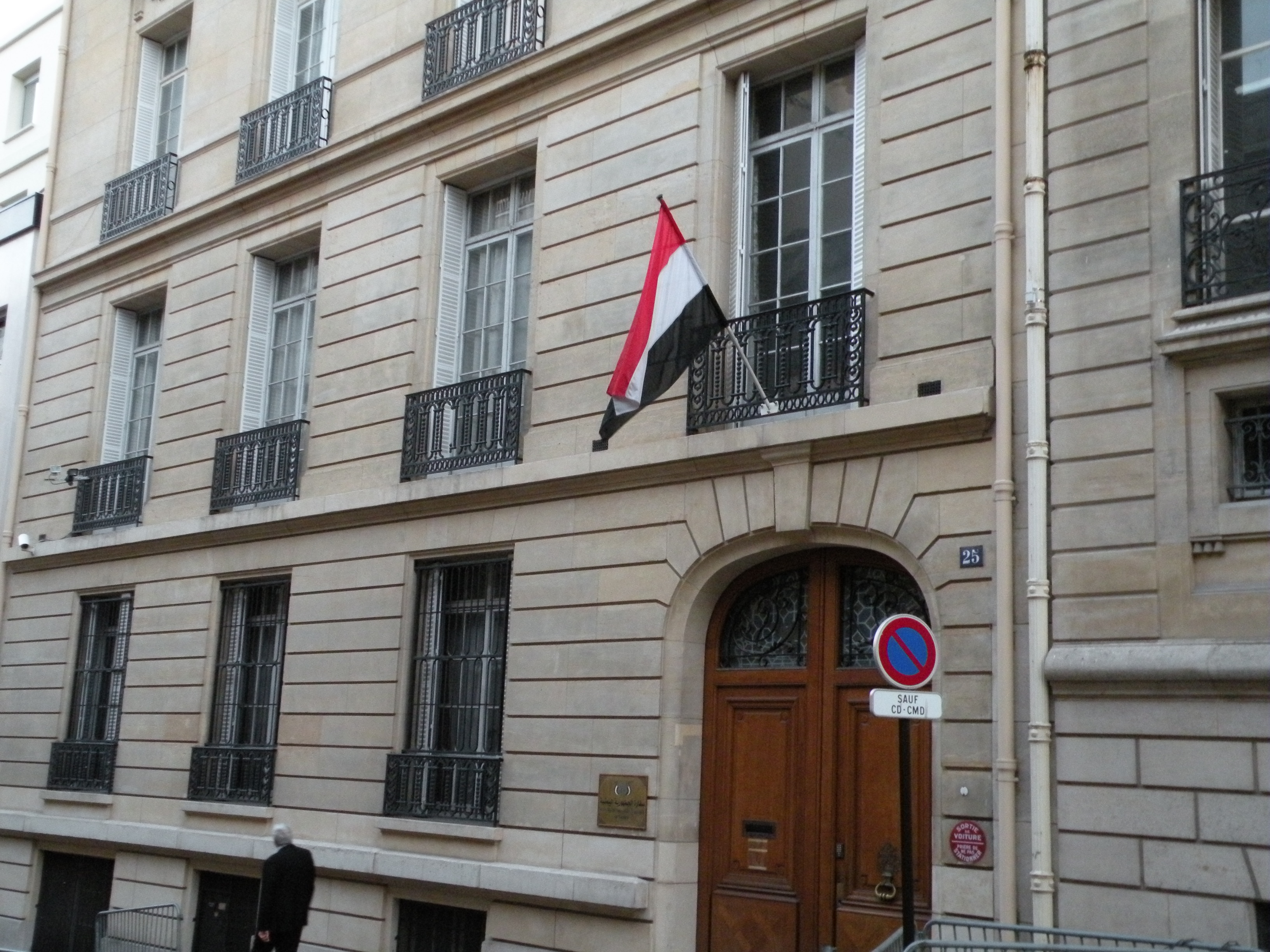
Embassy in Paris

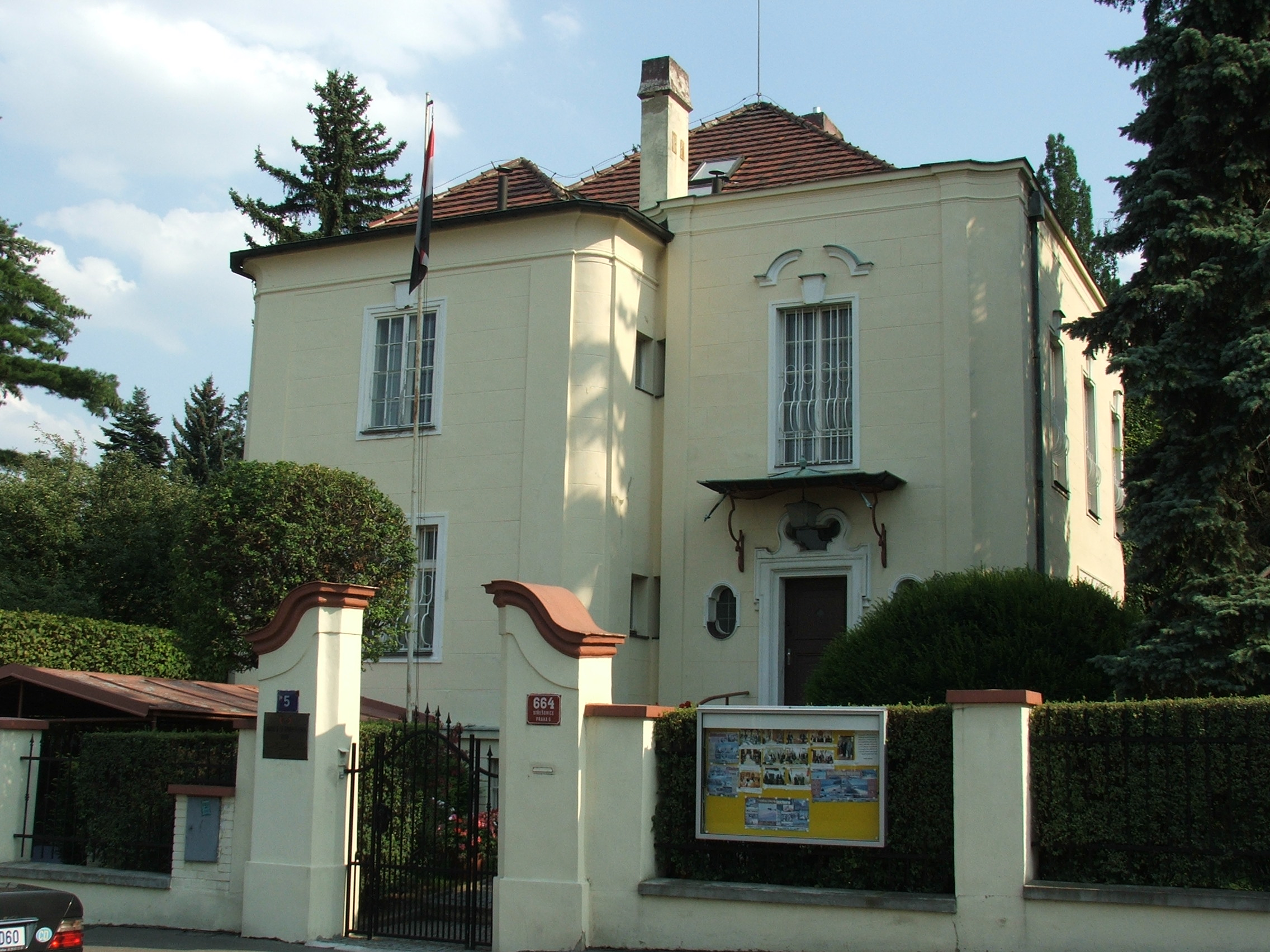
Embassy in Prague

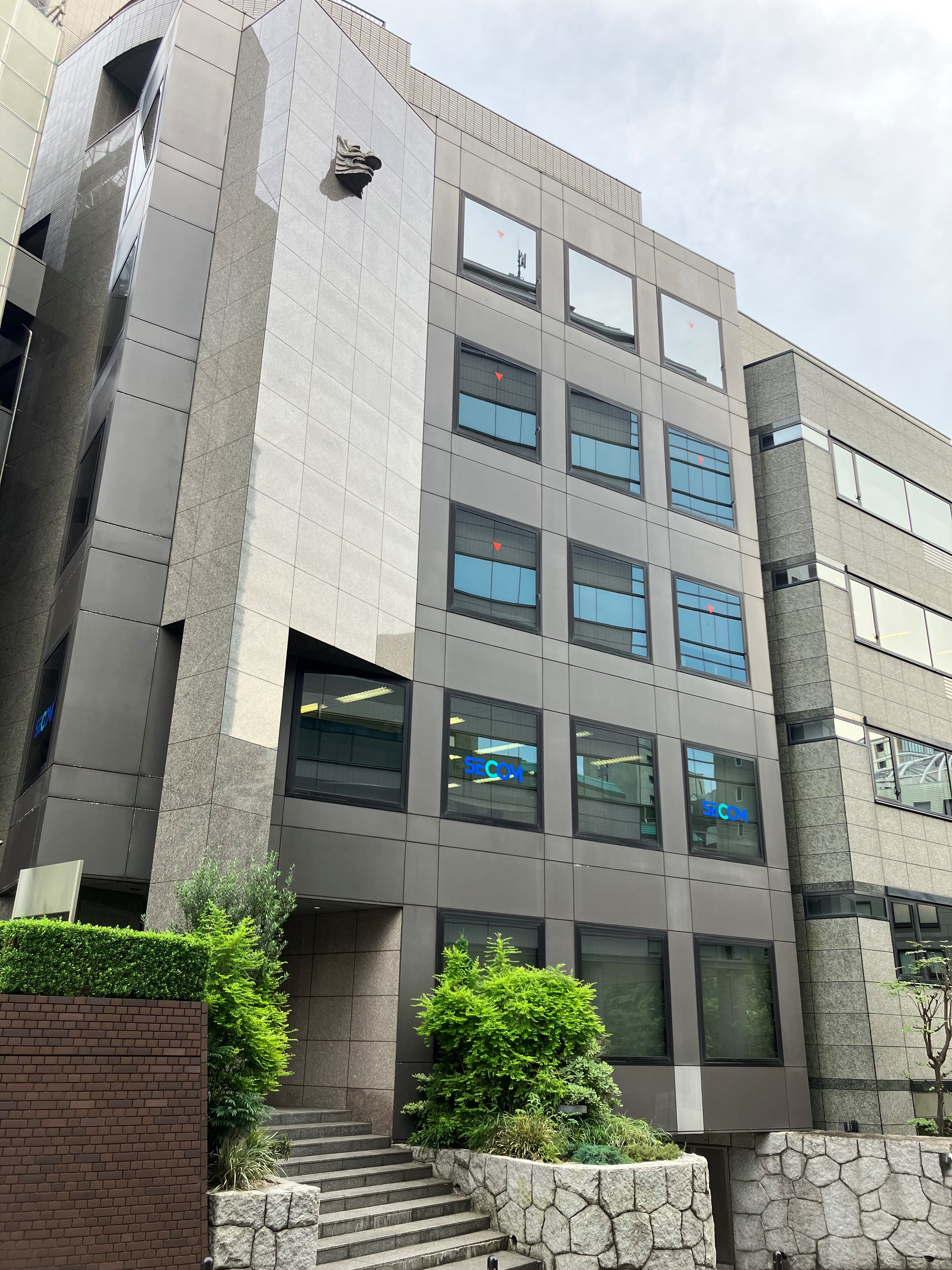
Building hosting the Embassy in Tokyo

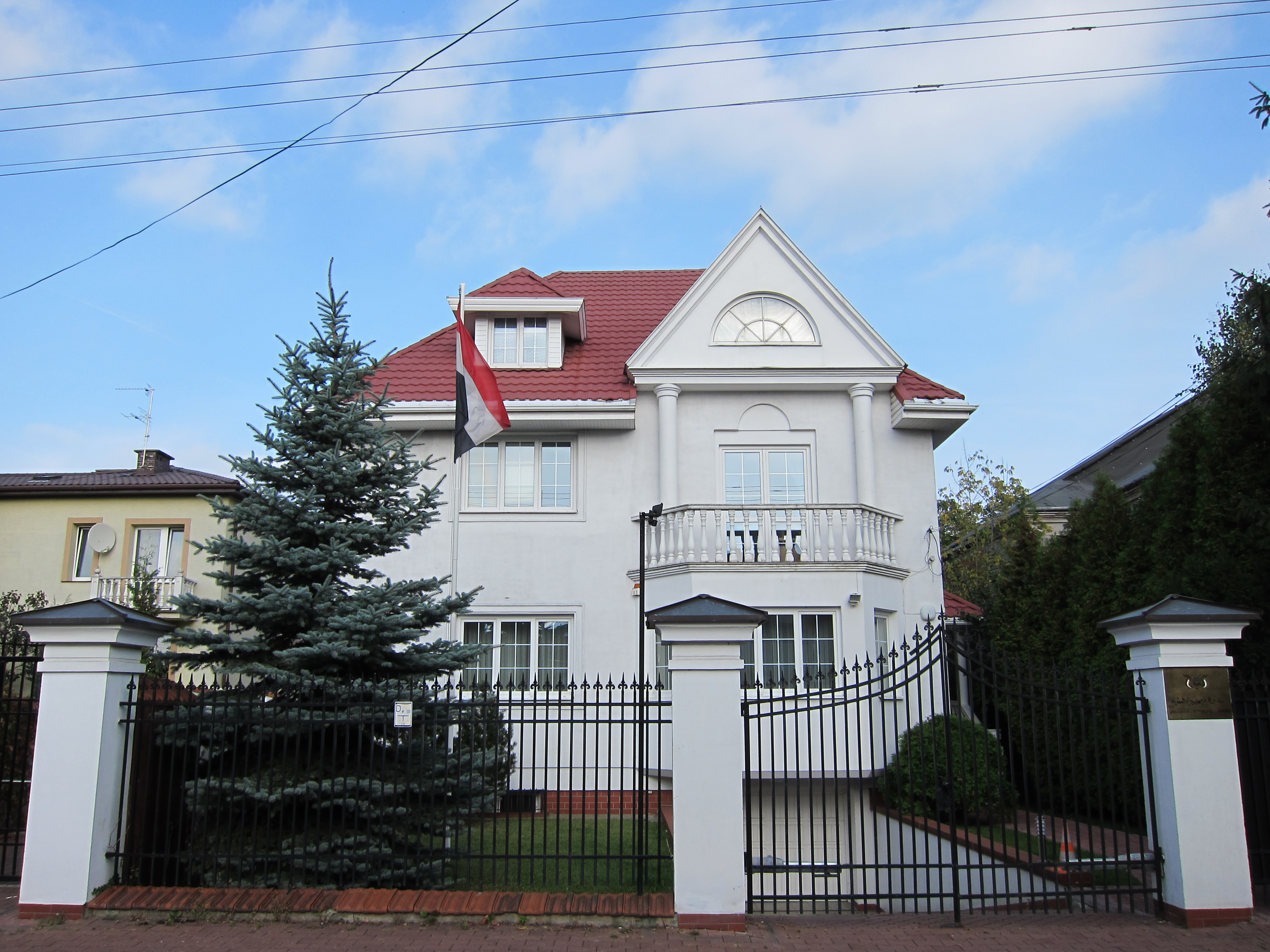
Embassy in Warsaw

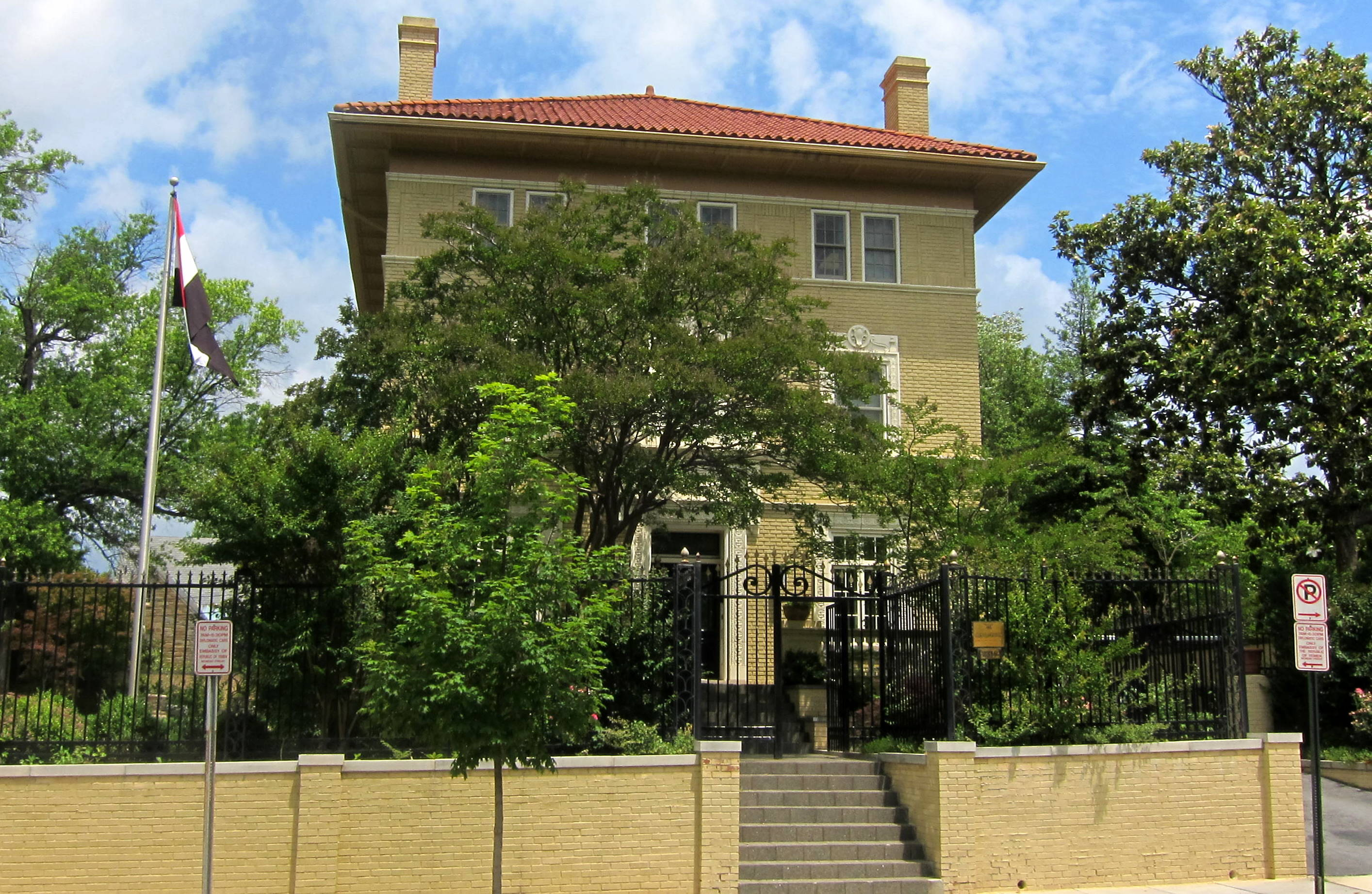
Embassy in Washington, D.C.

== Closed missions ==
=== Asia ===
Host country	Host city	Mission	Year closed	Ref.
South Korea	Seoul	Embassy (Note: Resident in Tokyo, Japan)	2001	
Vietnam	Hanoi	Embassy (Note: Resident in Hanoi, Vietnam)	1993	

=== Europe ===
Host country	Host city	Mission	Year closed	Ref.
Romania	Bucharest	Embassy	2006	

== See also ==
- Foreign relations of Yemen
- List of diplomatic missions in Yemen
- Visa policy of Yemen
