= Italo-Yemeni Treaty =

1926 treaty between Italy and Yemen

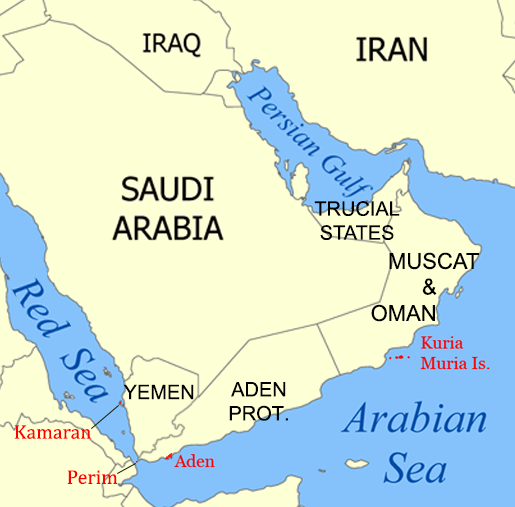
Arabian peninsula, 1937

The Italo-Yemeni Treaty of 1926 (also known as the Treaty of San'a) was a treaty between the Kingdom of Italy and the Mutawakkilite Kingdom of Yemen. Signed on September 2, 1926, it was defined as a friendship treaty that marked the beginning of relations between Italy and represented the first international recognition of Yemen's independence.

At the time, the Kingdom of Italy was ruled by the National Fascist Party with Benito Mussolini as head of government. The treaty recognized Imam Yahya Muhammad Hamid ed-Din as King of Yemen and acknowledged his claims to Aden. The treaty was renewed on October 15, 1937, after Italy had annexed Abyssinia (present-day Ethiopia).

== Background ==
Since the purchase of the Bay of Assab in 1869, Italy has demonstrated its interest in and control over the eastern coast of the Red Sea by putting pressure on the Yemen vilayet, and the Aden Protectorate in order to use the Emirate of Asir and Yemen as strategic and economic gateways to the Arabian Peninsula.

In 1926, Italy reached an agreement with Imam Yahya, who needed Italy's support in his conflict with Britain. Imam Yahya and the Italian Governor of Eritrea, Jacopo Gasparini, signed a treaty in Sanaa wherein Italy would acknowledge Yemeni independence and sovereignty, and both governments consented to promote further trade between the territories, which resulted successfully.

The Red Sea was of strategic importance to the United Kingdom due to both trade and as a route for its navy to pass through in order to reach India among other places. South of Yemen was the British Colony of Aden and Aden Protectorate which were at considerable risk of anti-colonialist rebellions.

Italy had colonies of its own in the region: Eritrea and Somaliland, both of low profitability. There was expectation that increased ties with Yemen would fuel increased trade with the colonies and bring the region into the Italian sphere of influence.

The Kingdom of Yemen at this point had its eye on annexing Aden and Imam Yahya also had aspirations for a Greater Yemen.
