= Visa requirements for Yemeni citizens =

Administrative entry restrictions

Visa requirements for Yemeni citizens are administrative entry restrictions by the authorities of other states placed on citizens of Yemen. As of 2026, Yemeni citizens had visa-free or visa on arrival access to 31 countries and territories, ranking the Yemeni passport 98th in terms of travel freedom according to the Henley Passport Index.

== Visa requirements map ==
Countries and territories with visa-free entries or visas on arrival for holders of regular Yemeni passports. Yemen Visa not required Visa on arrival eVisa Visa required prior to arrival Travel banned by the Yemeni government

== Visa requirements ==
Country	Visa requirement	Allowed stay	Notes (excluding departure fees)
Afghanistan	eVisa	30 days	Visa is not required in case born in Afghanistan or can proof that one of their parents is a national of Afghanistan or born in Afghanistan.; e-Visa : Visitors must arrive at Kabul International (KBL).
Albania	eVisa	90 days	Visa is not required for Holders of a valid multiple-entry Schengen, UK or US visa has been previously used once or residence permit of Schengen, UK, US or UAE 10 years.
Algeria	Visa required		Visa Issuance for passengers with a boarding authorization traveling as tourists to cities in the south of Algeria (Timimoun, Ghardaia, Ilizi, Djanet or Tamanraset) can obtain a visa on arrival for a maximum of 30 days. They must have: a return/onward ticket, a hotel reservation confirmation.
Andorra	Visa required		Although no visa requirements exist, apply the relevant regulations of France or Spain, whichever must be transited to reach Andorra.
Angola	Visa required		
Antigua and Barbuda	eVisa		Holders of a visa or residency issued by Canada, USA, United Kingdom or a Schengen Member State can obtain a visa upon arrival that costs USD100 for a maximum of 30 days.
Argentina	Visa required		
Armenia	Visa required		Spouses, parents, children, brothers and sisters of nationals of Armenia can obtain a visa on arrival. They must present proof confirming the relationship.; Passengers of Armenian origin can obtain a visa on arrival. They must present proof confirming their Armenian origin.
Australia	Online Visa required	12 months	May apply online (Online Visitor e600 visa).
Austria	Visa required		
Azerbaijan	Visa required		
Bahamas	eVisa		
Bahrain	eVisa	30 days	
Bangladesh	Visa required		
Barbados	Visa required		
Belarus	Visa required		Passengers can obtain a visa on arrival at Minsk (MSQ). They must have: documents used during visa application. These documents must have been submitted to the Consular Division at Minsk (MSQ) at least 3 (for short-term visas) or 5 working days (for long-term visas) before departure. Or - a service contract issued according the laws of Belarus; or - an original invitation letter issued by a Belarusian tourist company or a medical/health organization. The letter must be written on official headed paper; and must have: - the passenger's name, passport details, purpose and duration of stay; and - the original signature and official seal of the head of the inviting organization. Exception: This does not apply to passengers arriving from or transiting through the Russian Fed.
Belgium	Visa required		
Belize	Visa required		
Benin	eVisa	30 days	Must have an international vaccination certificate.
Bhutan	eVisa		Visa fee is 40 USD per person and visa application may be processed within 5 business days with duration of stay of 90 days.; e-Visa applicant is also subject to pay Sustainable Development Fee
Bolivia	eVisa		
Bosnia and Herzegovina	Visa required		
Botswana	eVisa		
Brazil	Visa required		
Brunei	Visa required		
Bulgaria	Visa required		
Burkina Faso	eVisa		
Burundi	Visa on arrival	1 month	
Cambodia	eVisa / Visa on arrival	30 days	
Cameroon	eVisa		
Canada	Visa required		US permanent residents (Green card) holders can enter visa free
Cape Verde	Visa on arrival		Visa on arrival at Sal, Boa Vista, São Vicente or Santiago international airports.; Requirement to register online 5 days before arrival; Also pay the airport security fee of CVE 3400 either online or on arrival.
Central African Republic	Visa required		
Chad	eVisa		
Chile	Visa required		
China	Visa required		24-hour visa-free transit through any international airports of China (except Ürümqi), allows domestic travel through different airports. (Note: Custom procedure for 24-hour visa-free transit is required in principle, except in Beijing (both Capital and Daxing), Shanghai Pudong, Hangzhou, Xiamen, Guangzhou, Shenzhen, Chengdu Tianfu and Xi'an if no leaving of international transit areas.); Visa on arrival for Macao
Colombia	eVisa		
Comoros	Visa on arrival	45 days	
Republic of the Congo	Visa required		
Democratic Republic of the Congo	eVisa	7 days	
Costa Rica	Visa required		Holders of a valid multiple-entry visa of any member state of the Schengen Area, Canada, or the United States may enter Cost Rica without a visa for maximum stay of 30 days.
Côte d'Ivoire	eVisa		e-Visa holders must arrive via Port Bouet Airport.
Croatia	Visa required		
Cuba	Visa required		
Cyprus	Visa required		
Czech Republic	Visa required		
Denmark	Visa required		
Djibouti	Visa on arrival		
Dominica	Visa not required	21 days	
Dominican Republic	Visa required		
Ecuador	eVisa		
Egypt	Visa required		Only applies citizens older than 45 or younger than 18 years of age.
El Salvador	eVisa		
Equatorial Guinea	eVisa		
Eritrea	Visa required		
Estonia	Visa required		
Eswatini	Visa required		
Ethiopia	eVisa	90 days	eVisa holders must arrive via Addis Ababa Bole International Airport
Fiji	Visa required		
Finland	Visa required		
France	Visa required		
Gabon	eVisa		eVisa holders must arrive via Libreville International Airport.
Gambia	Visa required		
Georgia	Visa required		Visa Exemptions: Passengers with a visa issued by an EEA Member State, Bahrain, Bermuda, Canada, Cayman Isl., Falkland Isl. (Malvinas), Gibraltar, Israel, Japan, Korea (Rep.), Kuwait, New Zealand, Oman, Qatar, Saudi Arabia, Switzerland, Turks and Caicos Isl., USA, United Arab Emirates or Virgin Isl. (British) for a maximum stay of 90 days. This does not apply to passengers with an e-visa. Information: The maximum stay is granted within 180 days. Passengers with a visa issued by Australia or United Kingdom for a maximum stay of 90 days. Information: The maximum stay is granted within 180 days. Passengers with a visa issued by Australia or United Kingdom for a maximum stay of 90 days. Information: The maximum stay is granted within 180 days. Passengers with Georgian origins for a maximum stay of 30 days.
Germany	Visa required		
Ghana	Visa required		
Greece	Visa required		
Grenada	Visa required		
Guatemala	Visa required		Visa is not required up to 90 days if holding a valid residence permit issued by Australia, Canada, GCC member state the United States the United Kingdom or a Schengen Area Member State.
Guinea	eVisa	90 days	
Guinea-Bissau	Visa on arrival	90 days	
Guyana	Visa required		
Haiti	Visa required		
Honduras	Visa required		
Hungary	Visa required		
Iceland	Visa required		
India	Visa required		Visa Exemptions: Passengers with a Person of Indian Origin (PIO) card. Passengers with an Overseas Citizen of India (OCI) card or booklet.
Indonesia	eVisa	60 days	Yemeni citizens require a guarantor to obtain an Indonesian eVisa; therefore, it is impossible to obtain one directly through the Directorate General of Immigration website. The travel agency acts as your sponsor during the visa application process, and Indonesia issues the visa under that company's sponsorship.
Iran	eVisa	30 days	
Iraq	eVisa		
Ireland	Visa required		
Israel	Visa required		Confirmation from Israeli Foreign Ministry is required before a visa is issued.
Italy	Visa required		
Jamaica	Visa required		
Japan	Visa required		Passengers with a passport transiting through Narita (NRT), Tokyo (HND) or Osaka (KIX) with a confirmed onward ticket for a flight to a third country within 72 hours can obtain a Shore Pass on arrival. They must not be subject to entry restrictions and they must: have documents required for the next destination; and - have proof of sufficient funds to cover their stay; and - arrive at and depart from the same airport.
Jordan	eVisa		eVisa available for 3, 6, 12 Months or 5 Years
Kazakhstan	Visa required		
Kenya	Electronic Travel Authorisation	3 months	
Kiribati	Visa required		
North Korea	Visa required		
South Korea	eVisa		Multiple-Entry Visa may be granted to who entered South Korea 4 or more times within the last 2 years, or 10 or more visits in total (one of those 10 visits should be within the last 2 years).; May apply online
Kuwait	Visa required		e-Visa can be obtained for holders of a Residence Permit issued by a GCC member state under the following conditions: To be 18 years old and over.; The residence permit for a GCC state must be valid for at least another 3 months.; To be accompanied by the sponsor of the residence permit if the sponsor is an individual.; Does not apply to holders of a GCC Student Visa and Non-Skilled Worker Visa
Kyrgyzstan	eVisa		
Laos	eVisa / Visa on arrival	30 days	18 (Note: Savannakhet Airport; Lanetoui - Mengkang (China); Meuangmom - Wan Pong (Myanmar); Banvang - Ban Khok Phai (Thailand); Namngeun - Huay Kon (Thailand); Paksan - Bueng Kan (Thailand); Paktaphan - Pak Saeng (Thailand); Pangmon - Ban Huak (Thailand); Phoudou (Thailand); Dak ta ock - Nam Giang (Vietnam); La Lai (Vietnam); Namkan (Vietnam); Namphao - Cau Treo (Vietnam); Namsoy - Na Meo (Vietnam); Naphao - Cha Lo (Vietnam); Pahang - Long Sap (Vietnam); Panghok - Tây Trang (Vietnam); Phoukeua - Bo Y (Vietnam)) of the 33 border crossings are only open to regular visa holders.; e-Visa may be used to enter Laos through the Luang Prabang, Pakse and Vientiane international airports, 3 Thai-Lao Friendship Bridges (Note: Vientiane (Friendship Bridge 1); Savannakhet (Friendship Bridge 2); Bokeo (Friendship Bridge 4)), in Boten (road and railroad), and in Vientiane (at Khamsavath railway station).; Visa on arrival is available at the Luang Prabang, Pakse and Vientiane international airports, 4 Thai-Lao Friendship Bridges (Note: Vientiane (Friendship Bridge 1); Savannakhet (Friendship Bridge 2); Khammouane (Friendship Bridge 3); Bokeo (Friendship Bridge 4)) and 7 border crossings. (Note: Nongnokkheane - Trapeang Kriel (Cambodia); Boten - Bo han (China); Golden Triangle/Samliemkham (Thailand); Khamsavath railway station (Thailand); Namheuang - Ban Na Kraseng (Thailand); Vang tao - Chongmek (Thailand); Dansavan - Lao Bảo (Vietnam))
Latvia	Visa required		
Lebanon	Visa on arrival		Visa Exemptions: Passengers of Lebanese descent with a foreign passport and a national ID card, expired passport or a civil extract issued by Lebanon. Visa Issuance: Nationals of Yemen can obtain a visa on arrival at Beirut (BEY) for a maximum stay of 1 month. They must have: - at least USD 2,000.- in cash; and - a non-refundable return or circle trip ticket; and - a copy of a hotel reservation confirmation or a private residential address with a telephone number in Lebanon. They can apply to extend their stay for an additional 2 months. Passengers with a confirmation that a visa has been approved before departure issued to businessmen, bankers, directors and investors by the Lebanese Immigration Directorate can obtain a visa on arrival at Beirut (BEY) for a maximum stay of 6 months.
Lesotho	eVisa		
Liberia	eVisa		
Libya	Admission refused		
Liechtenstein	Visa required		
Lithuania	Visa required		
Luxembourg	Visa required		
Madagascar	eVisa / Visa on arrival	90 days	
Malawi	eVisa		
Malaysia	Visa not required	90 days	Extendable to a yearly Yemeni Special Pass visa.
Maldives	Visa on arrival	30 days	
Mali	Visa required		
Malta	Visa required		
Marshall Islands	Visa required		
Mauritania	eVisa		
Mauritius	Visa required		
Mexico	Visa required		Visa Exemptions: Passengers with a multiple-entry visa issued by Canada, Japan, United Kingdom or a Schengen Member State for a maximum stay of 180 days. Entry may be refused by immigration officials for individuals who were previously denied a US visa, even if holding a valid Mexican visa.
Micronesia	Visa not required	30 days	
Moldova	eVisa		
Monaco	Visa required		
Mongolia	Visa required		
Montenegro	Visa required		Visa Exemptions: Passengers with a visa, valid for the period of stay, issued by Australia, Bulgaria, Canada, Ireland (Rep.), Japan, New Zealand, Romania, USA, United Kingdom or a Schengen Member State for a maximum stay of 30 days.
Morocco	Visa required		
Mozambique	eVisa	30 days	
Myanmar	Visa required		
Namibia	eVisa		
Nauru	Visa required		
Nepal	eVisa / Visa on arrival	90 days	
Netherlands	Visa required		
New Zealand	eVisa	6 months	Holders of an Australian Permanent Resident Visa or Resident Return Visa may be granted a New Zealand Resident Visa on arrival permitting indefinite stay (pursuant to the Trans-Tasman Travel Arrangement), subject to meeting character requirements and obtaining an Electronic Travel Authority prior to departure.
Nicaragua	Visa required		Visa on arrival if holding a valid visa of United States, Canada, and Schengen Member state
Niger	Visa required		
Nigeria	eVisa	90 days	
North Macedonia	Visa required		Visa is not required for stays upto 15 days if holding a valid multiple entry visa of Canada, the United States, United Kingdom, Schengen Area member state, or residence permit of Schengen Area member state.
Norway	Visa required		
Oman	eVisa		
Pakistan	eVisa		
Palau	Visa on arrival	30 days	
Panama	Visa required		Visa is not required for holders of a multiple-entry visa valid for at least 6 months at the time of entry or permanent residency issued by Australia, Canada, European Union, Japan, Singapore, South Korea, US, UK.
Papua New Guinea	eVisa	60 days	
Paraguay	Visa required		
Peru	Visa required		
Philippines	Visa required		Residents of the United Arab Emirates may obtain an eVisa through the official Philippine eVisa website. A valid Emirati residence visa must be shown upon an eVisa application.
Poland	Visa required		
Portugal	Visa required		
Qatar	eVisa	30 days	May apply online
Romania	Visa required		
Russia	Visa required		
Rwanda	eVisa / Visa on arrival	30 days	May apply online.; Can also be entered on an East Africa tourist visa issued by Kenya or Uganda
Saint Kitts and Nevis	eVisa		
Saint Lucia	Visa required		
Saint Vincent and the Grenadines	Visa not required	1 month	
Samoa	Visa not required	60 days	
San Marino	Visa required		
São Tomé and Príncipe	eVisa		
Saudi Arabia	Visa required		Passengers with a tourist or business visa issued by USA, United Kingdom or a Schengen Member State traveling as tourists can obtain a visa on arrival for a maximum stay of 90 days. The visa must have been used at least once and should have an entry stamp of the issuing country. Passengers are allowed a total stay of 90 days within a period of 12 months. Visa fee must be paid by credit card.
Senegal	Visa required		Visa on arrival holding an official invitation letter issued by a Senegalese Authority to participants of international events or proof of accommodation
Serbia	Visa required		Visa Exemptions: Passengers with a visa issued by Switzerland, United Kingdom, USA or an EEA Member State for a maximum stay of 90 days. The visa must be multiple entry and valid for the period of intended stay. Information: The maximum stay of 90 days is granted within a 6 month period.
Seychelles	Electronic Travel Authorisation	3 months	
Sierra Leone	eVisa		
Singapore	eVisa		Conditions applies, else regular visa required
Slovakia	Visa required		
Slovenia	Visa required		
Solomon Islands	Visa required		
Somalia	eVisa	30 days	
South Africa	Electronic travel authorization		
South Sudan	eVisa		Obtainable online; Printed visa authorization must be presented at the time of travel
Spain	Visa required		
Sri Lanka	ETA / Visa on arrival	30 days	Electronic Travel Authorization can also be obtained on arrival.; 30 days extendable to 6 months.
Sudan	Visa not required	30 days	Nationals of Yemen arriving from Yemen for a maximum stay of 30 days.
Suriname	eVisa		
Sweden	Visa required		
Switzerland	Visa required		
Syria	Visa not required		
Tajikistan	eVisa / Visa on arrival	45 days	
Tanzania	eVisa		
Thailand	eVisa		
Timor-Leste	Visa on arrival	30 days	At Presidente Nicolau Lobato International Airport or the Dili Sea Port only.
Togo	eVisa	15 days	
Tonga	Visa required		
Trinidad and Tobago	Visa required		May apply online.
Tunisia	Visa required		
Turkey	eVisa	30 days	Must pay an eVisa fee before entering.; e-Visa can be obtained if holding a multiple entry visa or a residence permit from any of the Schengen countries, USA, UK or Ireland.
Turkmenistan	eVisa		Eligible for a visa on arrival for a maximum stay of 10 days if having a letter of invitation issued by a company registered in Turkmenistan and approved by the Ministry of Foreign Affairs
Tuvalu	Visa on arrival	1 month	
Uganda	eVisa	90 days	An East African Tourist Visa issued by Kenya or Rwanda is accepted to enter Uganda if the passenger has first entered the country which has issued the visa. It is a multiple-entry visa and is valid for 90 days.; May apply online.
Ukraine	Visa required		
United Arab Emirates	eVisa		May apply using 'Smart service'.
United Kingdom	Visa required		
United States	Visa restricted		Effective June 9, 2025, U.S. visas will no longer be issued to citizens of 12 countries, with certain exemptions.
Uruguay	Visa required		
Uzbekistan	Visa required		Visa not required for holders of a valid Residency Visa in the United Arab Emirates for at least 3 months.; May apply online.
Vanuatu	Visa required		May apply online.
Vatican City	Visa required		Open borders but de facto follows Italian visa policy.
Venezuela	eVisa		Introduction of Electronic Visa System for Tourist and Business Travelers.
Vietnam	eVisa	30 days	Visa Exemptions: Nationals of Yemen arriving at Phu Quoc (PQC) for a maximum stay of 30 days.; Nationals of Yemen arriving at any international airport in Viet Nam with a connecting flight to Phu Quoc (PQC) on the same calendar day. A maximum stay of 30 days will be granted for Phu Quoc (PQC).
Zambia	eVisa	90 days	
Zimbabwe	eVisa	90 days	

== See also ==
- Visa policy of Yemen
- Yemeni passport
- List of nationalities forbidden at border
