= List of diplomatic missions in Yemen =

This is a list of diplomatic missions in Yemen.

Due to the Yemeni Civil War, several countries have closed their embassies in Sana'a. Other countries have relocated their embassies to the southern city of Aden.

== Embassies ==
=== Sana'a ===
1. Eritrea
2. Iran (Note: Iran recognizes the Houthis as the ruling authority of all of Yemen and does not recognize the UN-recognized government as it broke off diplomatic relations with it.)
3. Lebanon
4. North Korea

=== Aden ===
1. Kuwait
2. Saudi Arabia
3. United Arab Emirates

== Consulates ==
=== Aden ===
- Egypt (Consulate General)
- Somalia (Consulate General)

== Accredited embassies ==
Resident in Abu Dhabi, United Arab Emirates

- Chile
- Colombia
- Costa Rica
- Panama
- Romania
- Seychelles

Resident in Addis Ababa, Ethiopia

- Burkina Faso
- Burundi
- Central African Republic
- Guinea Bissau
- Lesotho
- South Sudan
- Swaziland
- Tanzania
- Togo
- Zambia

Resident in Cairo, Egypt

- Angola
- Congo-Brazzaville
- Croatia
- Djibouti
- Estonia
- Latvia
- Lithuania
- Slovakia

Resident in Muscat, Oman

- Austria
- Indonesia
- Iraq
- Malaysia
- Sri Lanka
- United Kingdom

Resident in Riyadh, Saudi Arabia

- Afghanistan (Note: As of 27 January 2022, Yemen has not yet formally recognized Islamic Emirate of Afghanistan as de jure legitimate government of Afghanistan.)
- Algeria
- Argentina
- Australia
- Azerbaijan
- Belgium
- Brazil
- Bulgaria
- Canada
- China
- Cuba
- Cyprus
- Czech Republic
- Denmark
- Equatorial Guinea
- Finland
- France
- Georgia
- Germany
- Ghana
- Greece
- Guinea
- Hungary
- Ireland
- Italy
- Ivory Coast
- Japan
- Kenya
- Kyrgyzstan
- Liberia
- Libya
- Malta
- Mexico
- Morocco
- Nepal
- Norway
- Peru
- Philippines
- Poland
- Portugal
- Russia
- Senegal
- Serbia
- Sierra Leone
- Somalia
- South Africa
- South Korea
- Spain
- Sudan
- Sweden
- Switzerland
- Tajikistan
- Thailand
- Tunisia
- Turkmenistan
- Ukraine
- United States
- Uzbekistan
- Venezuela
- Vietnam

Resident in other cities

- Brunei (Amman)
- Haiti (Rome)
- Iceland (Paris)
- Marshall Islands (New York City)
- Singapore (Singapore)
- Zimbabwe (Kuwait City)

== Closed missions ==
Country	Mission type	Place	Year
Algeria	Embassy	Sanaa	2015
Bulgaria	Embassy	Sanaa	2020
China	Embassy	Sanaa	2015
Cuba	Embassy	Sanaa	2015
Czech Republic	Embassy	Sanaa	2011
Djibouti	Embassy	Sanaa	2015
Egypt	Embassy	Sanaa	2015
Ethiopia	Embassy	Sanaa	
France	Embassy	Sanaa	2015
Germany	Embassy	Sanaa	2015
Hungary	Embassy	Sanaa	
India	Embassy	Sanaa	2015
Indonesia	Embassy	Sanaa	2019
Iraq	Embassy	Sanaa	2015
Italy	Embassy	Sanaa	2015
Japan	Embassy	Sanaa	2015
Jordan	Embassy	Sanaa	2015
Libya	Embassy	Sanaa	2015
Malaysia	Embassy	Sanaa	2015
Mauritania	Embassy	Sanaa	2015
Morocco	Embassy	Sanaa	2015
Netherlands	Embassy	Sanaa	2015
Oman	Embassy	Sanaa	2015
Pakistan	Embassy	Sanaa	
Palestine	Embassy	Sanaa	2008
Poland	Embassy	Sanaa	2008
Qatar	Embassy	Sanaa	2015
Romania	Embassy	Sanaa	2008
Russia	Embassy	Sanaa	2015
Somalia	Embassy	Sanaa	2015
South Korea	Embassy	Sanaa	2015
Spain	Embassy	Sanaa	2015
Sudan	Embassy	Sanaa	2015
Syria	Embassy	Sanaa	2015
Tunisia	Embassy	Sanaa	2015
Turkey	Embassy	Sanaa	2015
United Kingdom	Embassy	Sanaa	2015
United States	Embassy	Sanaa	2015
Vietnam	Embassy	Sanaa	1995
Hungary	Embassy	Aden	—
Oman	Consulate General	Aden	—
United States	Embassy	Aden	1969

== See also ==
- Foreign relations of Yemen
