= Somalia–Yemen relations =

- Somalia: Yemen

Somalia–Yemen relations are bilateral relations between Somalia and Yemen. Both members of the Arab League, the two countries formally established diplomatic ties on December 18, 1960.

== History ==
=== Ancient ===
Relations between the modern-day territories of Somalia and Yemen stretch back to antiquity. A number of both Yemeni and Somali clans trace descent to the latter region. The 1st century CE Periplus of the Erythraean Sea, among other documents, also reports early commercial exchanges between traders inhabiting city-states on the northern Somalia littoral with Himyarite and Sabaean merchants. Numerous artefacts dating from this period have been uncovered in Somalia, such as at the Damo site in the northeastern Puntland region. In the Middle Ages, the Somali Sultanates often recruited troops from Yemen's Hadhramaut region. During the medieval period, disgruntled Yemenis from the Hadhrami wars additionally sought and received asylum in Somali Kingdoms like Ajuran Empire and Adal Sultanate.

=== Medieval ===
Relationships between Somalis and Yemenis in medieval periods differed from the coastal Somalis who had good trade relations with Yemenis, and the proud Somalis who viewed Arabs in general in a negative light. Some western travellers reported on these accounts a follows:

In their persons the Somalis are neither Negroes nor Arabs. They have woolly hair, drawn out into points, in every direction, but their noses are not flat. They are finely limbed, with a very dark skin, and beautifully white teeth. The expression of their countenance is neither fierce, nor unpleasing. I consulted several of the respectable merchants of Aden and Mocha, respecting the possibility of penetrating into the interior of Africa, by the caravans, which return from Berbera, and they uniformly agreed that, by securing the friendship of one of the Somali chiefs, and learning the language, a European might, in his own character, make the journey in safety. It would certainly however be more wise that he should pass for a Muslim, but not for an Arab, a nation whom they detest.

=== Contemporary ===
Yemen in turn unconditionally opened its borders to Somali nationals following the outbreak of the civil war in Somalia in the early 1990s.

Over the ensuing interim period, the Yemeni authorities maintained relations with Somalia's newly established Transitional National Government and its successor the Transitional Federal Government. In September 2012, at a mini-summit on Somalia held during the 67th session of the UN General Assembly, Yemeni Foreign Minister Abu Bakr al-Qirbi, on behalf of President of Yemen Abd Rabbo Mansour Hadi, welcomed the Somali government's completion of its scheduled shift from a transitional administration to a permanent one and urged the international community to continue its support for the ongoing post-conflict reconstruction efforts in Somalia.

The Federal Government of Somalia was later established on August 20, 2012, representing the first permanent central government in the country since the start of the conflict. The following month, Hassan Sheikh Mohamud was elected as the new government's first President. The election was welcomed by the Yemeni authorities, who re-affirmed Yemen's continued support for Somalia's government, its territorial integrity and sovereignty. During the Houthi insurgency in 2015 in Yemen, Foreign Minister of Somalia Abdisalam Omer likewise reiterated his administration's support for the legitimacy of Yemen's incumbent government led by President Abd Rabbuh Mansur Hadi.

== Trade and agreements ==
In May 2014, the Somali State Minister of Foreign Affairs and International Cooperation Bur’i Mohamed Hamza met with the Yemeni Ambassador to Somalia Fu'ad Mohamed Al Zorqah to discuss bilateral cooperation. The conference was held at the Foreign Affairs Ministry compound in Mogadishu and touched on a number of issues, including the launching of a direct flight between Mogadishu and Sana'a. Operated by Al Saeda Airlines, it is the first air route directly linking both capitals since the collapse of Somalia's former central government in 1991.

In June 2014, the Fisheries Minister of the Puntland State of Somalia Hasan Mahmoud announced that the Somali and Yemeni governments are slated to sign a Memorandum of Understanding to regulate fishing within Somalia's territorial waters by Yemeni fishermen. The Puntland and Yemeni Fisheries ministries are also scheduled to hold talks on bilateral cooperation, with the aim of preserving and effectively exploiting marine resources.

On 14 May 2025, seven Yemeni fishermen were arrested by Puntland security forces near Ras Asir after a local coast guard intercepted their vessel. The officials said the fishermen were using an illegal fishing method known as Hawi and that they did not have a registered agent within Somalia. Both actions are illegal under the region's fishing laws. They were held for over a month until their release on 17 June 2025.

== Diplomatic missions ==
Somalia maintains an embassy in Yemen. The diplomatic mission is led by Ambassador Ismail Qassim Naji.

Yemen also has an embassy in Mogadishu. The diplomatic mission is headed by Ambassador Fu'ad Mohamed Al Zorqah.

In May 2015, Yemen opened a new consulate in Puntland. Additionally, Puntland is slated to open a consulate in Sana'a.

== See also ==
- Foreign relations of Somalia
- Foreign relations of Yemen
