= Visa policy of Yemen =

Policy on permits required to enter Yemen

Visitors to Yemen must obtain a visa from one of the Yemeni diplomatic missions unless they come from one of the visa countries whose citizens may obtain a visa on arrival. Until January 2010, Yemen had a visa on arrival policy for some 50 nations.

== Visa policy map ==
Visa policy of Yemen Yemen Visa not required (30 days) Visa on arrival Visa required Admission restricted Admission refused

== Visa exemption ==
- Hong Kong
Holders of Hong Kong Special Administrative Region passport do not require a visa to enter Yemen, for a maximum stay of 30 days.

Visa is not required for those of Yemeni origin if holding a genuine Yemeni identification document or proof of being of Yemeni origin. The origin can be proved by a birth certificate or any document from the father who has Yemeni nationality.

== Visa on arrival ==
=== Ordinary passports ===
Citizens of the following countries can obtain a visa on arrival in Yemen, valid for a maximum stay of 3 months (unless otherwise stated):

- Algeria (Note: Must arrive from Algeria.) _{(1 month)}
- Bahrain
- Egypt (Note: Must arrive from Egypt.)
- Jordan
- Kuwait
- Malaysia
- Oman
- Qatar
- Saudi Arabia
- Syria
- United Arab Emirates

=== Non-ordinary passports ===
In addition to countries whose citizens are eligible for a visa on arrival, holders of diplomatic, official, service, special passports of Cuba (1 month), Mauritania (1 month), Morocco (1 month), Pakistan (3 months), Turkey (1 month), holders of diplomatic passports of Lebanon (indefinite stay), and holders of Palestine Authority VIP passports (indefinite stay) can obtain a visa on arrival for stays up to the duration listed.

== Electronic visa (e-Visa) ==
Yemen introduced an electronic visa system on June 24, 2025, for certain eligible nationals. Currently, only tourist group applications submitted by accredited travel agencies are permitted. Approved visas can be obtained electronically, but a sticker visa must still be collected from Yemeni embassies or consulates. Tourist groups must have at least ten members, round-trip tickets, and travel through a Yemeni agency accredited by the General Authority for Tourism.

An urgent tourist visa can be issued at border crossings in certain circumstances after approval by the General Authority for Tourism.

== Airside Transit ==
Passengers can transit without visa with a confirmed onward ticket for a flight to a third country within 24 hours. They must stay in the international transit area of the airport and have documents required for the next destination.

== Admission restrictions ==
=== Prior approval required ===
- Comoros
Citizens of the Comoros are specifically required to obtain prior approval from the Director of Immigration at Sanaa International Airport before entering Yemen.

=== Entry restricted ===
- Libya
- Sudan
- Tunisia
Citizens of the following countries are specifically required to begin their journey in their home countries prior to arriving in Yemen. If they do not arrive from their home countries, they will not be allowed to enter Yemen, though they may still transit.

=== Entry banned ===
- Israel
Visitors holding Israeli passports, visas or other Israeli entry documents may be refused entry or transit into Yemen, even if not leaving the aircraft and proceeding by the same flight.

== See also ==
- Visa requirements for Yemeni citizens
- Yemeni passport
- Tourism in Yemen
