= Saudi Arabia–Yemen relations =

- Saudi Arabia: Yemen

Saudi Arabia–Yemen relations refers to the current and historical relationship between the neighbouring sovereign states of Saudi Arabia and Yemen. The two countries at one time did enjoy good relations and closely cooperated in military, economic and cultural issues. Now because of the ongoing Yemeni Civil War and the realignments of power in the Middle East with the emergence of al-Qaeda and the emergence of the Houthi movement in Yemen, Saudi Arabia has led a military intervention in the country.

== History ==
Modern Saudi-Yemeni relations began in 1803 with an attack by Saudi forces of the territory of Zaydi Imamate with the help of some local Yemeni tribes. The Saudis won and had control over the Tihama region until 1818 when the forces of the Ottoman khedive of Egypt, Mohammed Ali Pasha, destroyed the Saudi state.

The establishment of a protectorate over the Idrisi sultanate in Asir led to clashes between Ibn Saud and imam Yahya of Yemen. Ibn Saud captured Asir and Jizan while the imam managed to occupy the oasis of Najran. Negotiations proved fruitless, the Saudis regained control over Najran and occupied about 100 kilometers of the coastal plain In 1948, Saudi Arabia provided aid to Imam Ahmed fearing the "constitutional" nature of an uprising in Yemen.

In 1934, the Saudi–Yemeni War broke out with a Yemeni invasion, responded by strong Saudi offensive. The war ended with Yemen relinquishing control of three modern Saudi provinces, Asir, Jizan and Najran. Since then, the two countries have always had a complicated relationship.

Decades later in 2015, as Yemen was plunged into civil war, Saudi Arabia launched a military intervention in support of the internationally recognized Government of Yemen following the Houthi movement overthrowing the government in Sana'a, with the United Arab Emirates, Bahrain and Qatar joining the military intervention against the Houthis. In response, the Houthis have retaliated by firing rockets and drones at Saudi Arabia, the UAE, Israel, Jordan and Egypt.

== Tensions with Saleh Government ==
Ali Abdullah Saleh served as president of North Yemen, and then a united Yemen between 1978 and 2012. Over these three fraught decades, Yemen's relationship with Saudi Arabia oscillated between low points like Saleh's siding with Saddam Hussein during the first Gulf War, to deepening Saudi sponsorship during the first decade of the War On Terror.

Saleh's falling out of Saudi favor was a contributing factor to his fall from power in 2012. His attempt to regain power by allying with the Houthis, who he had once used the Saudi Air Force to bomb, eventually led to his assassination in December 2017.

=== 1998 clash ===
1998 Saudi Arabia-Yemen clashes
| Date | 21 – 23 July 1998 |
| Location | Duwaima Island, Yemen |
| Result | Yemen retakes Duwaima island |
| Territorial changes | Status quo ante bellum |

Belligerents
| Saudi Arabia | Yemen |

Casualties and losses
| unknown | 3 dead, 9 injured |

Saudi Arabia and Yemen clashed over Duwaima Island in July 1998. According to Yemen, Saudi Arabia sent nine naval vessels to seize the island on 21 July, killing three Yemeni coast guards and injuring nine. The attack was reportedly preceded by a nine-hour artillery bombardment. Two days later, the Yemenis claimed to have landed on the island and retaken it, but this was disputed by Saudi Arabia, who claimed to hold control of 75% of the island.

=== Border ===
In September 2003, in an effort by the Saudi government to control incursions by Yemenis into Saudi Arabia and slow terrorist actions, the Saudis began construction of a wall of cement-filled pipeline, 10 feet (3.0 meters) in diameter along its border with Yemen. Following complaints by the Yemeni government to the Saudis that construction of the wall violated a year 2000 treaty between the two nations, the Saudis stopped work on the wall in February 2004. But by that time, 47 miles (76 kilometers) of cement-filled barrier, of the 1,100 miles (1,800 kilometers) border had been erected.

== See also ==
- Foreign relations of Saudi Arabia
- Foreign relations of Yemen
- List of ambassadors of Saudi Arabia to Yemen
- Saudi Arabia–Yemen border

== Bibliography ==
Gause, F. Gregory, (1990), Saudi-Yemeni Relations: Domestic Structures and Foreign Influence, Columbia University Press, ISBN 9780231070447.
