= Arab Cooperation Council =

- مجلس التعاون العربي
- Formation: February 16, 1989
- Dissolved: 1990s
- Members: Iraq; Jordan; North Yemen; Egypt
- Official language: Arabic

The Arab Cooperation Council (ACC) was founded on 16 February 1989 by North Yemen, Iraq, Jordan, and Egypt.

The ACC was created partly in response to the four countries being left out of the Gulf Cooperation Council (GCC), partly out of a desire to foster closer economic cooperation and integration among its members, and partly as an Egyptian step to rejoin mainstream Arab politics after years of ostracism following its peace treaty with Israel. The members of the ACC, unlike the GCC states, appeared uncomfortable with the grouping's exclusion of other Arab states; the ACC charter explicitly states that "Membership in the ACC shall be open to every Arab state wishing to join it." The short-lived organization held at least 17 formal meetings at the summit or ministerial level in 1989 alone, in addition to dozens of working-level sessions. This level of institutionalization was more extensive than most Arab subregional gatherings had exhibited. Somalia and Djibouti showed interest to join the ACC but were asked to wait until the ACC would be consolidated.

However, the organization did not survive the crisis that followed Iraq's invasion of Kuwait on 2 August 1990. In part, this can be attributed to the four countries' lack of common geopolitical interests, the absence of a true shared identity (beyond common status as Arab states), and tensions between Egypt and Iraq. After the Iraqi invasion of Kuwait, Egypt in particular opposed Iraqi actions—actually joining the coalition that sent troops to Saudi Arabia and eventually liberated Kuwait. In retrospect, Egyptian President Hosni Mubarak said that the security aspects of the ACC were probably designed by Iraq to lure Cairo into backing Saddam Hussein's foray into Kuwait.

Within weeks of the invasion of Kuwait, the ACC's Secretariat canceled upcoming organizational events and the grouping ceased to exist in anything but name. Egypt officially suspended its membership in the ACC in early 1994.

The ACC's failure was no surprise to many observers. Arab political pundit Mohamed Hassanein Heikal wrote in his book Illusions of Triumph (1992) that "The four leaders of the Arab Cooperation Council came [from] different and contradictory worlds, with outlooks so varied that they seemed improbable partners."
