= 2020 Aden airport attack =

Attack in Yemen

- Part of the Yemeni Civil War (2014–present)
- Location: 12°49′32″N 45°02′11″E; Aden, Aden Governorate, Yemen
- Date: 30 December 2020; Around 13:24 AST (10:24 UTC) (Note: Airport CCTV footage appears to show an explosion at 13:24, which Bellingcat notes is corroborated by public reports of the explosion beginning by 13:27 at the latest. (Note: Yemeni Archive first notes the time of the attack as "Between 13:24 – 13:25 Yemen Local Time", but then states that the explosions happened at "13:27 local time in Yemen" later in its report, possibly conflating the time of the attack with the time of the first public report of the event that Bellingcat had found.))
- Target: Aden International Airport
- Attack type: Bombings; Mass shooting Mortar attack (suspected); Drone strike (suspected)
- Deaths: 28 (Note: Belqees TV reported that a total of 29 people had been killed.)
- Injuries: 107
- Perpetrator: Houthis (per UN investigation) (Note: The Houthi rebels denied responsibility. Al-Qaeda in the Arabian Peninsula was also suspected.)

On 30 December 2020, a plane carrying members of the recently formed Yemeni government landed at Aden International Airport in the southwest of Yemen. As passengers disembarked, there were explosions and gunfire, leaving 28 people dead and 107 others injured. None of the passengers were hurt in the attack and the Yemeni cabinet members were quickly transported to Mashiq Palace for safety.

The airport attack allegedly led the Houthis, suspected of carrying out the attack, to be designated as a United States Foreign Terrorist Organization, a move human rights activists argued would worsen famine in Yemen. The designation went into effect the day before U.S. President Joe Biden was sworn in, whose administration revoked the designation about four weeks later.

== Background ==
In order to deal with the infighting between the Yemeni government forces and those of the secessionist Southern Transitional Council, a new cabinet was formed with the backing of neighbouring Saudi Arabia. The formation of the new unity government, which includes equal numbers of representatives from each region of Yemen's northern and southern areas, was the result of over a year's worth of intense negotiations mediated by the Saudis, and was meant to end the infighting so that the two sides could fight together against the Houthi rebels in the ongoing civil war.

Although the Yemeni government had been based in the temporary capital city of Aden after the Houthi rebels took control of the capital city Sanaa, its recent operations had usually been conducted while in exile in Saudi Arabia, since the Southern Transitional Council had seized Aden over a year earlier and forced the government out.

After the new 24-member cabinet was announced earlier in December, the new unity government, led by Prime Minister Maeen Abdulmalik Saeed, was sworn in by President Abdrabbuh Mansur Hadi on 26 December 2020 in Saudi Arabia's capital, Riyadh.

The newly formed and internationally recognized government had planned to televise its return from Saudi Arabia to Yemen, to signal to its citizens that their worries were going to be addressed. The event was also meant to mark the successful result of the lengthy negotiations.

== Attacks ==
External videos
- Attack as seen from near the plane

On 30 December 2020, a Yemenia plane flew from Saudi Arabia to the port city of Aden in southwestern Yemen, carrying members of the newly formed Yemeni government, including the prime minister, as well as the Saudi ambassador to Yemen. (Note: President Hadi, who has been living in Riyadh after the Houthi rebels took control of Sanaa, was not aboard.) The airport hall was crowded with local officials as well as civilians hoping to greet the members of the new cabinet. Hundreds of people had gathered on the airport apron outside.

Around 13:24, as the passengers disembarked, massive explosions were heard. (Note: There are conflicting reports regarding how many explosions there were, with reports ranging from two to four.) A local security source had reported that "three mortar shells had landed on the airport's hall", while Yemeni Communication Minister Naguib al-Awg, who was among those flown in, has suggested they were drone strikes, and a spokesperson for the chairman of the Southern Transitional Council believed they were missiles. The Telegraph has reported that analysis of the explosion footage showed one explosion occurring on the north side of the airport terminal, and the second occurring around 30 seconds later about 20 metres (70 ft) away. One of the wounded recalled that a "missile hit the terminal's gate" while he was metres away.

The explosions sent the crowd of hundreds scrambling for cover, with the disembarking ministers either running back up into the plane or down the stairs to find shelter. Gunfire then erupted from armoured vehicles. Bodies lying on the airport apron and elsewhere at the airport were seen after the attack as thick plumes of black and white smoke emanated from the airport terminal.

Most of the casualties were reportedly civilians—including airport staff—with Voice of America reporting that most of the casualties had reportedly occurred within the terminal. (Note: The Times reported that all casualties had occurred within the terminal.) However, all passengers that were aboard the plane remained unharmed. The cabinet members, as well as the Saudi ambassador, were quickly taken to Mashiq Palace, the presidential palace in Aden, for safety.

Another blast was heard about four hours later around Mashiq Palace. No casualties as a result of the later explosion were reported. Saudi-owned news channel Al Arabiya reported that an "explosive-laden drone" had been intercepted and destroyed nearby.

== Casualties ==
At least 28 people were killed and 107 others were injured, with at least 30 wounded seriously enough to require major surgery. The casualties included aid workers and journalists, as well as government officials and members of the military.

Three members of the International Committee of the Red Cross (ICRC) were killed, including two Yemenis and one Rwandan; three others were wounded, with one seriously so. Also among the dead was a reporter of Belqees TV, a Yemeni television news channel, who was reporting live from the airport when his connection went silent. Yemeni Minister of Information Moammer al-Iryani also reported that at least ten other journalists had also been wounded.

Yasmin al-Awadhi, deputy minister of housing and urban development at the Ministry of Public Works and Highways and one of the few female government officials, was killed in the attack. (Note: Al-Awadhi has also been reported as an "undersecretary at the labour ministry". The New York Times stated that it was the deputy transport minister who was reported dead, but is unclear if it was also referring to al-Awadhi.) It was also reported that a deputy minister of youth and sport as well as a deputy transport minister were amongst those injured. In addition, September Net, a website of the armed forces of Yemen, reported that four colonels had died in the attack.

== Aftermath ==
Yemen's Foreign Minister Ahmad Awad bin Mubarak initially blamed the Houthis for the attack, and stated that four ballistic missiles had been fired at the airport, but made the statement without providing evidence. The Houthis denied responsibility, with its deputy information secretary placing the blame on the continued infighting between the government and the Southern Transitional Council, and naming the latter as the party most likely to have carried out the attack.

The Southern Transitional Council also blamed the Houthis, as well as Qatar and Turkey. Western officials stated that it was likely the work of Houthi rebels, but had not ruled out al-Qaeda in the Arabian Peninsula (AQAP) or dissatisfied southern separatist factions. (Note: Three weeks before, AQAP militants had been suspected of killing five south Yemen separatists in what was believed to be their most significant attack in the region in months.)

Communication Minister Naguib al-Awg insisted that the plane had been the original target of the attacks, as the plane had landed later than previously planned. (Note: A local investigation headed by Interior Minister Haydan reported that a missile had struck the bay where the plane was originally scheduled to park, but the plane had been unable to park there due to the crowd that had gathered on the apron. An open-source investigation by Bellingcat and Yemeni Archive found evidence corroborating this claim.) Deputy Information Minister Oussama Sharem stated that civilians heading to Cairo that were waiting inside had been targeted.

A United Nations flight that was originally heading to Aden that day ended up altering its course due to the attack.

Early the next day, a Saudi-led coalition conducted air strikes on Sanaa, the Houthi-held capital, apparently in retaliation for the previous day's attacks, which it had blamed on the Houthis. Warplanes carried out attacks over several hours, striking the airport as well as other areas of the city. Al Jazeera confirmed that there had been more than eight raids, while Houthi-owned television channel Almasirah reported that fifteen different locations had been hit in the city and the surrounding governorate, including sites in Sanhan and Bani Hashish Districts. Casualties had not been reported.

By morning, military checkpoints had been set up throughout Aden, and streets had been occupied by security forces. The airport reopened on 3 January 2021 amidst continued reconstruction, with Transport Minister Abdel Salam Hamid having announced the previous day that flights would return to normal.

About a week after the attack on the airport, on 6 January 2021, six civilians were killed and seven wounded during a Houthi shelling in the southwestern governorate of Taiz. The Houthi offensive continued for at least five days, with a spokesperson for the Yemeni army reporting that, in total, 12 people had been killed, 30 injured, and 50 taken as civilian hostages.

On 7 January 2021, the UN secretary-general's special envoy for Yemen, Martin Griffiths, visited the airport to review the damage sustained and met with members of the new cabinet. That evening, a loud explosion was heard outside a central prison in Aden. Several cars and a wall were damaged, but no casualties were reported.

=== Terrorist designation ===
On 10 January 2021, U.S. Secretary of State Mike Pompeo announced that he intended to designate the Houthis as a Foreign Terrorist Organization (FTO), effective 19 January 2021, referring to the airport attack as an example of the Houthis' terrorist capabilities. Foreign Policy's sources reported that the attack led the administration "on an irreversible track toward the designation", despite the administration understanding that the designation would likely significantly exacerbate the humanitarian disaster in Yemen.

The Yemeni government welcomed the designation and urged the international community to take similar action, while various UN officials and a number of countries, including China, France, and Russia, voiced their concern over the humanitarian impact of the designation during a meeting of the UN Security Council on 14 January 2021.

UN Under-Secretary-General for Humanitarian Affairs and Emergency Relief Coordinator Mark Lowcock explained that because about 90 percent of the food in Yemen is imported, and formally designating the Houthis as an FTO would result in parties previously contributing to the food supply chain possibly aborting operations for fear of being put out of business or in jail due to U.S. regulations associated with the designation, Pompeo's decision would likely result in "a large-scale famine on a scale that we have not seen for nearly 40 years".

ICRC director of operations Dominik Stillhart also voiced concerns about the designation's "chilling effect", while the executive director of the UN's World Food Programme, David Beasley, stated that the designation "is literally going to be a death sentence to hundreds of thousands, if not millions of innocent people".

In addition, a member of the transition team of then–U.S. president-elect Joe Biden, who took office the day after the terrorist designation became effective, stated that the decision to adopt the designation "feel[s] like sabotage", and accused Pompeo of "literally risking hundreds of thousands of lives" in order to "feed his own domestic political ambitions".

On 19 January, the day the designation went into effect, Biden's nominee for secretary of state Antony Blinken stated, during his Senate confirmation hearing, that the designation did "nothing particularly practical in advancing the efforts against the Houthis", and "propose[d] to review [the designation] immediately to make sure that what we are doing is not impeding the provision of human assistance".

On 22 January, a spokesperson for the U.S. State Department confirmed that they had begun reviewing the designation and were working hard to quickly reach a conclusion. Twenty-two aid groups, including International Rescue Committee, Mercy Corps, Norwegian Refugee Council, Oxfam, and Save the Children, urged the Biden administration to revoke the designation to avoid "put[ting] millions of lives at risk" and "hurt[ing] UN-led efforts to find a peaceful solution to the conflict".

On 25 January, the U.S. Treasury Department announced a temporary exemption from sanctions for some transactions with the Houthis, with the exemption scheduled to expire on 26 February. However, the UN has noted that parties contributing to the food supply chain still intend to withdraw from Yemen due to the terrorist designation, notwithstanding the Treasury's month-long exemption.

Tens of thousands of Yemenis marched in Sanaa on 25 January to protest the terrorist designation. (Note: Hundreds also protested outside the closed U.S. embassy in Sanaa on 18 January, the day before the designation went into effect.)

It has been conjectured that a number of explosions occurring days after the terrorist designation became effective were due to Houthi missiles targeting Riyadh, and that the Houthis were no longer taking responsibility for their attacks partially due to the terrorist designation.

On 5 February, a U.S. State Department official confirmed that the Biden administration was planning to revoke the terrorist designation, after having informed members of Congress of the decision earlier that day. The news came about a day after President Biden announced that he was ending U.S. support of Saudi Arabia's participation in the Yemeni Civil War. Secretary of State Blinken later formally announced on 12 February that he was revoking the designation, effective 16 February.

== Investigations ==
=== Local investigation ===
President Hadi has directed Interior Minister Ibrahim Haydan to head a committee to investigate the attack, with support from the military. Prime Minister Saeed later announced that "[p]reliminary results of the investigation ... show that Houthi militants were behind the attack" which was carried out by guided missiles, and that Iranian experts had also been involved. Saeed also stated that there had been three precision-guided missiles, and that they had targeted the plane, the arrivals hall, and the airport lounge. Saeed added that experts would be examining the missile remains that had been collected by investigators to determine their origins.

On 14 January 2021, Al Arabiya reported that, earlier that day, the interior ministry stated that the missiles used were ballistic, that they had been launched from Houthi-controlled territory over 100 km (60 mi) away, and that "Iranian and Lebanese experts were behind the missile launching systems of the rockets" used in the attack. Interior Minister Haydan noted that the "medium-range surface-to-ground ballistic missiles" used "a navigation system that relied on a precise GPS-guided technology". He added that "only the Houthi militia has this system in Yemen". Haydan also noted that the missiles used had serial numbers similar to missiles used in other Houthi attacks that relied on the same technology. He also added that the missiles had a range between 70 km (43 mi) and 135 km (84 mi).

Minister Haydan's report stated that the first missile hit the airport's lounge at 13:24:34, the second missile hit the aircraft parking area at 13:25:09, and the third missile hit the stone wall of the garden outside the lounge at 13:25:33. The minister also noted that the place where the plane was scheduled to park had been changed at the last moment due to a crowd that had gathered on the apron to receive the plane's passengers. He added that the second missile landed where the plane had been initially scheduled to park, and stated that this confirmed that the plane had been deliberately targeted.

=== Open-source investigation ===
External image
- Locations hit, according to Bellingcat Numbers indicate order of strikes. Image of plane added to depict position during attack.

On 9 February 2021, investigative news site Bellingcat and human rights project Yemeni Archive published the findings of a joint investigation based on publicly available open-source intelligence. The two sites concluded that three missiles had struck the airport, with two of them having been launched from the vicinity of a police training center in Dhamar Governorate about 200 km (120 mi) roughly to the north of Aden International Airport, and one being launched from Taiz International Airport or its environs roughly 140 km (90 mi) from the airport in Aden. The investigators noted that these missile launch sites were in Houthi-controlled territory, suggesting that the Houthis were responsible for the attack. Both parties also noted that there actually appeared to be two missiles that launched from the area around the Taiz airport, but one of them seemed to have failed and landed near a factory close to the Taiz airport. (Note: Bellingcat noted that the factory was about a few kilometres from the Taiz airport, while Yemeni Archive noted that the missile appeared to have landed about 500 m (1,600 ft) from the launch site.) In addition, by analyzing shadows in missile launch videos found online, they determined that the launches occurred not long after 13:00. (Note: Screenshots in the reports of both parties show that most estimates were within a few minutes of when the missiles were reported to have struck the airport, though Bellingcat acknowledged that using shadows to determine the time a video was recorded was not a reliably accurate method.)

The investigators reported that the first missile that struck the Aden airport exploded a few metres up the northern wall of the terminal, underneath an overhanging roof; (Note: Bellingcat noted that this would suggest that the weapon used was not a mortar, which would normally have a trajectory with a high arc.) the second missile hit the airplane parking bay closest to the terminal, about 50 m (160 ft) away from where the plane carrying the ministers was parked; and the third missile impacted a low wall immediately north of the terminal. By analyzing the crater it made and the smoke rising from it after it exploded, the investigators determined that the missile that landed in the parking area came from the northwest, roughly in the direction of Taiz. They also determined that the other two missiles that hit the airport came roughly from the north, but were unable to be much more precise because those two missiles had struck walls. However, due to the missiles' angles of arrival and the timing of the publicly available missile launch videos, the investigators reasoned that these two missiles were the ones seen launched from Dhamar, and the missile that landed in the parking area was the one successfully launched from Taiz.

Yemeni Archive noted that Minister Haydan claimed that the second missile hit where the plane was originally scheduled to park before it was changed at the last moment, and Bellingcat stated that a journalist at Yemeni news site Bawabatii who was present at the attack had also reported the same. Bellingcat also pointed out that a red carpet had been laid out for that bay, which was the one closest to the terminal, and added that about two months earlier, a red carpet had also been laid out for a flight in which passengers had deplaned via a stairway that had lined up with the red carpet.

The investigators were unable to make significant conclusions about the type of missiles used by examining the images of the missile fragments that have been posted publicly. However, images claimed to be those of the missile that fell near the factory in Taiz appear to show that the missile had control-canards, which suggests that guided missiles had been used. (Note: Because these photos were largely focused on the missile remnants, the lack of landmarks meant that the veracity of these photos could not be easily confirmed via geolocation.) Bellingcat also speculated that the Badr-1P, a Houthi guided missile claimed to have a range of 150 km (93 mi), could have been used in the launch from Taiz, but since Dhamar is roughly 200 km (120 mi) from the airport in Aden, those missiles may not have been Badr-1P missiles unless they had been somehow modified.

=== International investigation ===
Varied groups and parties, including the governor of Aden, have requested the United Nations to supervise an international investigation.

On 3 February 2021, Xinhua reported that a local government source stated, on the condition of anonymity, that a UN plane had arrived at the airport that day carrying a team of "senior international experts" to investigate the airport attack. The anonymous source also stated that the team of experts had examined the bombing site and interviewed airport officials before heading to Mashiq Palace to meet with government officials.

An investigation by the UN team of experts found Yemen's Houthis were responsible for the attack.

== Reactions ==
UN Secretary-General António Guterres "condemn[ed] the deplorable attack" on the airport, and offered condolences to the victims' families as well as the Yemeni government and its people, as reported by his special envoy for Yemen, Martin Griffiths. Griffiths also considered the attack "a serious violation of International Humanitarian Law" that "potentially amounts to a war crime".

Arab League Secretary-General Ahmed Aboul Gheit also condemned the attack on the airport, calling it a "cowardly terrorist act". Aboul Gheit also expressed sorrow for the victims and hope that the wounded remained safe.

The European Union strongly condemned the attack and reaffirmed its belief that "there can only be a political solution to the conflict in Yemen", offering condolences to the victims' families and support for those seeking a peaceful resolution.

A spokesperson for the Iranian Ministry of Foreign Affairs condemned the attack in Aden, which he blamed on the Saudi-led coalition, and called for dialogue instead of violence.

A number of other nations, including Egypt, India, Jordan, Turkey, the United Kingdom, and the United States, condemned the airport attack.

== See also ==
- Battle of Aden Airport
- January 2020 Ma'rib attack
- August 2020 Ma'rib attack
- List of massacres in Yemen
