= Mohammed Saeed Al-Jaber =

Saudi diplomat and politician

- محمد سعيد آل جابر
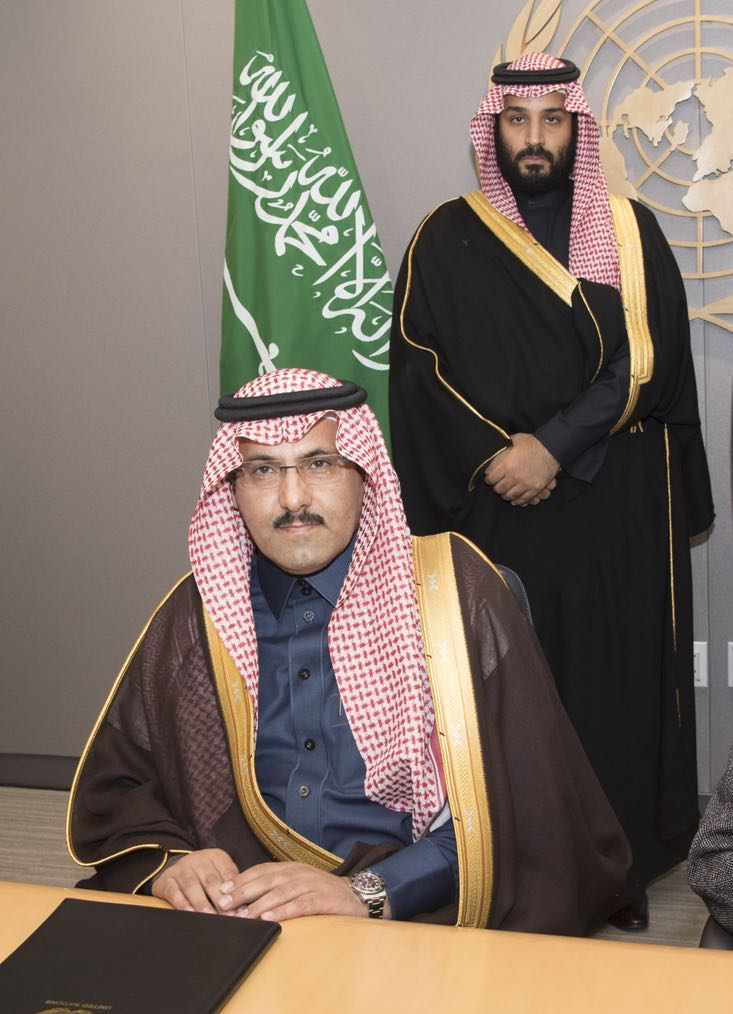

Ambassador of Saudi Arabia to Yemen
- Incumbent
- Assumed office 1 September 2014
- Monarch: Salman
- Preceded by: Ali Mohammed Al-Hamdan

General Supervisor SDRPY
- Incumbent
- Assumed office 1 May 2018

Personal details
- Born: 1970 (age 55–56) Aser, Saudi Arabia

Mohammed Saeed Al-Jaber (Arabic: محمد سعيد آل جابر; born 1970) is a Saudi diplomat and politician. He has been the Saudi Arabian ambassador to Yemen since 2014. He also serves as the General Supervisor of the Saudi Development and Reconstruction Program for Yemen.

== Early life and education ==
Al-Jaber was born in 1970 in Asir, southern Saudi Arabia. He earned a master's degree in Business Administration with First-Class Honors from King Abdulaziz University. Additionally, he obtained a Master's in Military Science from the Saudi Armed Forces Command and Staff College, graduating at the top of his class with the Sword of Honor. He also studied strategic analysis in the US and planning psychological operations in the UK.

== Career ==
Al-Jaber is a diplomat and strategist. He has served as the Kingdom of Saudi Arabia's ambassador to Yemen since 2014, having been appointed just 10 days before the Houthi takeover of the capital, Sana'a, in September 2014. His appointment came during a period of significant tension and instability in Yemen. He quickly became involved in the Kingdom's efforts to back international peace initiatives related to Yemen, working closely to support the efforts of UN special envoys to Yemen, including Jamal Benomar, Ismail Ould Cheikh, Martin Griffiths, and Hans Grundberg.

Al-Jaber led the Saudi delegation during the Geneva Consultations on Yemen peace talks in 2015, as well as the Yemen peace talks in Kuwait in 2016. Later, he participated in the 2018 Stockholm talks and supported the 2022 UN-brokered truce and ceasefire efforts in Yemen. He also oversaw numerous political and diplomatic initiatives related to the Yemeni crisis. In 2023, he led mediation efforts between the Yemeni government and the Houthi militia, and in a significant and courageous move, he visited Sana'a for the first time since 2014 to meet with Houthi officials. After two years of mediation and negotiations between the Yemeni government and the Houthis, a roadmap was agreed upon by both parties.

Prior to leading the Saudi diplomatic mission in Yemen, he held roles as a military attaché in Yemen and Djibouti. He had been entrusted with various political, strategic planning, negotiation issues. He also headed the Strategic Analysis Department at the Saudi Ministry of Defense and was a former lecturer at the Armed Forces Institute of Intelligence and Security. Additionally, he represented the Saudi Ministry of Defense in the quadrilateral border security dialogue held in the United States.

On the humanitarian front, Al-Jaber played a key role in overseeing Saudi and Gulf relief operations in Yemen in January 2015, two months before the Houthis overthrew the Peace and Partnership Agreement and placed the-President Hadi and government officials under house arrest in Sana’a. From 2017 to 2018, he served as the executive director of the Yemen Comprehensive Humanitarian Operations in Yemen. In 2018, he spearheaded the establishment of the SDRPY, leading a team of Saudi experts and specialists to design SDRPY's development strategy. Al-Jaber continues to serve as the General Supervisor of the SDRPY since 2018.
