= Special Envoy of the Secretary-General =

Official of the United Nations

Special Envoy of the Secretary-General (SESG) is a title used by certain United Nations officials who are appointed by the Secretary-General of the United Nations to deal with specific issues.

Examples include the SESGs on HIV/AIDS in Africa, on LRA-affected areas, on indigenous people, to a specific country, et cetera. George H. W. Bush, the 41st president of the United States, was chosen by the UN to serve as the Special Envoy for South Asia in December 2005. Others include Bill Clinton (a former president of the United States), who was named the Special Envoy for Haiti in 2009, and Gordon Brown (a former Prime Minister of the United Kingdom), who was named the Special Envoy for Global Education in July 2012. For much of 2012, Kofi Annan, the seventh Secretary-General of the United Nations, was Joint Special Envoy of the United Nations and the Arab League for Syria. There are many other people of different backgrounds who serve the Secretary-General.

== Current Special Envoys ==
Special Envoys of the Secretary-General (SESGs) active as of May 2025 include:

- Miguel Ángel Moratinos Cayaubé (ESP), Special Envoy of the Secretary-General to combat Islamophobia, appointed 7 May 2025.
- Julie Bishop (AUS), Special Envoy of the Secretary-General on Myanmar, appointed 6 April 2024.
- Retno Marsudi (INA), Special Envoy of the Secretary-General for Water, appointed 13 September 2024.
- Hanna Tetteh (GHA), Special Envoy of the Secretary-General for the Horn of Africa, appointed 22 February 2022.
- Amandeep Singh Gill (IND), Acting Special Envoy of the Secretary-General on Technology, appointed March 10 June 2022.
- Hans Grundberg (SWE), Special Envoy of the Secretary-General for Yemen, appointed 6 August 2021.
- Xia Huang (CHN), Special Envoy of the Secretary-General for the Great Lakes Region of Africa, appointed April 2019.
- Geir Otto Pedersen (NOR), Special Envoy of the Secretary-General for Syria, appointed 31 October 2018.
- Gordon Brown (GBR), Special Envoy of the Secretary-General for Global Education, appointed 13 July 2012.
- Jayathma Wickramanayake (LKA), Envoy of the Secretary-General on Youth.

=== Personal Envoys ===
Personal Envoys of the Secretary-General active as of May 2025 include:

- María Angela Holguín Cuéllar (COL), Personal Envoy of the Secretary-General on Cyprus, appointed 2 March 2025.
- Staffan de Mistura (ITA), Personal Envoy of the Secretary-General for Western Sahara, appointed 6 October 2021.
- Mirko Manzoni(CHE), Personal Envoy of the Secretary-General for Mozambique, appointed 8 July 2019.

== Former Special Envoys ==
The UN has appointed a number of Special Envoys, including:

| Name | (Former) Title | Date of Appointment |
|---|---|---|
| Mark Carney | United Nations special envoy for climate action and finance | March 2020 |
| Mahmoud Mohieldin | Special Envoy on Financing the 2030 Agenda | 4 February 2020 |
| Maria-Francesca Spatolisano | Acting Special Envoy of the Secretary-General on Technology | March 2019 |
| Christine Schraner Burgener | Special Envoy of the Secretary-General on Myanmar | 28 April 2018 |
| Michael Bloomberg | Special Envoy for Climate Action, Special Envoy of the Secretary-General for Cities and Climate Change | 5 March 2018, 31 January 2014 |
| Martin Griffiths | Special Envoy of the Secretary-General for Yemen | 16 February 2018 |
| Maria Soledad Cisternas Reyes | Special Envoy on Disability and Accessibility | 20 June 2017 |
| Macharia Kamau and Mary Robinson | Special Envoys of the Secretary-General for El Niño and Climate | 20 May 2016 |
| Ismail Ould Cheikh Ahmed | Special Envoy of the Secretary-General for Yemen | 25 April 2015 |
| Said Djinnit | Special Envoy of the Secretary-General to the Great Lakes Region | 17 July 2014 |
| Staffan de Mistura | Special Envoy of the Secretary-General for Syria | 10 July 2014. |
| Hiroute Guebre Sellassie | Special Envoy of the Secretary-General for the Sahel | 30 April 2014 |
| Han Seung-soo | Special Envoy of the Secretary-General for Disaster Risk Reduction and Water | 19 December 2013 |
| Kofi Annan | Joint Special Envoy for the United Nations and the Arab League for Syria | 23 February 2012 |
| Haile Menkerios | Special Envoy of the Secretary-General for Sudan and South Sudan | 29 July 2011 |
| Bill Clinton | Special Envoy for Haiti | May 2009 |
| George H. W. Bush | Special Envoy for South Asia | 30 December 2005 |
| Terje Rød-Larsen | Special Envoy of the Secretary-General for the Implementation of United Nations Security Council Resolution 1559 | 3 January 2005 |
| Virendra Dayal | Special Envoy of the Secretary-General for facilitating the Negotiations to end apartheid in South Africa | 1992 |
| George C. Marshall | Special Envoy for negotiating the Chinese Communist Party and the Nationalists (Kuomintang) into a unified government | 1945 |

== See also ==
- Special Representative of the Secretary-General
- Goodwill ambassador
