= 2020 Marib attack =

2020 Marib attack may refer to:

- January 2020 Marib attack
- August 2020 Marib attack
