= International reactions to the Saudi Arabian-led intervention in Yemen (2015–present) =

International reactions to the Saudi Arabian-led intervention in Yemen were mixed. Most other Arab League nations and several Western governments backed the Saudi Arabia-led military coalition, but other governments warned against an escalation in the violent situation in Yemen.

== Political responses and commentary ==
=== Supranational ===
- Arab League – Delegates to the Arab League voted to study the formation of a joint military force on 29 March 2015, days after the intervention in Yemen began. Secretary-General Naril Elaraby affirmed that the intervention would "continue until Houthi militias withdraw and submit their weapons" and asserted that the international operation was necessary.
- European Union – The European Union criticized the military intervention. It suggested that military intervention would not solve the crisis and expressed concern about the "serious regional repercussions" after the Saudi military intervention in Yemen, describing that this move is not a solution, and urging regional powers to "act responsibly". The European Union reiterates its support for all efforts by the United Nations.
- Organisation of Islamic Cooperation (OIC) – Iyad Ameen Madani, secretary-general of the OIC, criticised the Houthis and said military action was made inevitable by their actions. He said he hoped the intervention would restore stability to Yemen.
- United Nations – Zeid Ra'ad Al Hussein, the UN High Commissioner for Human Rights, warned that Yemen appeared to be verging on "total collapse". He expressed concern about civilian casualties, including those apparently caused by a Saudi airstrike on a camp for displaced persons in northern Yemen. Russia called an emergency meeting of the United Nations Security Council for 4 April 2015 to discuss calling for "humanitarian pauses" in the airstrikes. A leaked UN report of January 2016 found that the Saudi coalition had conducted airstrikes that had targeted civilians, including camps for internally displaced people, weddings, schools, religious centers, hospitals, vehicles, and markets.
  - Zeid Ra'ad al Hussein, the UN's Commissioner for Human Rights, told the UN Security Council that the Saudi coalition is responsible for a "disproportionate number" of attacks on civilian areas.
  - UN Humanitarian Coordinator for Yemen, Johannes van der Klaauw, said Saudi-led air strikes violate international law.

=== National ===
- Afghanistan – The Islamic Republic of Afghanistan government announced its support for the military intervention by Saudi Arabia in Yemen.
- Algeria – Minister of Foreign Affairs of Algeria, Ramtane Lamamra, expressed "very great and deep concern" about the events in Yemen and said the "escalation of violence" would only make the situation worse. Lamamra reportedly presented a ceasefire initiative at an Arab League summit in Egypt calling for the Houthis to withdraw from Sanaa and the Yemeni House of Representatives to resume meeting in exchange for an end to the bombing campaign and security guarantees for the Houthis and their allies.
- Australia – On April 14, 2015, Australian Foreign Affairs Minister, Julie Bishop, said she shared the view of U.N. Secretary General, Ban Ki-moon, in calling for a ceasefire. She believes all parties involved in the conflict in Yemen should go back to the negotiating table.
- Bangladesh – The foreign ministry said in a statement that Bangladesh deplored acts of violence perpetrated by Houthis on the people of Yemen "resulting in humanitarian crisis." "Bangladesh supports all efforts led by Saudi Arabia in restoring the legitimate state authority and realisation of aspirations of the people of Yemen, as well as upholding the sovereignty and territorial integrity of Yemen," it said. Bangladesh also urged for resumption of political process guided by the commitments made by the parties within the Gulf Cooperation Council Framework, the National Dialogue Conference outcomes and relevant UN Security Council resolutions.
- Canada – On 27 March 2015, Canadian Foreign Affairs Minister, Rob Nicholson, issued a statement on the situation in Yemen, saying "Canada supports the military action by Saudi Arabia and its Gulf Cooperation Council partners and others to defend Saudi Arabia's border and to protect Yemen's recognized government at the request of the Yemeni president."
- China – The Chinese government expressed deep concern over the situation in Yemen. It urged all parties to resolve the dispute through dialogue.
- Djibouti – Djibouti supports foreign military intervention in Yemen and is prepared to help evacuate its nationals if the security situation there deteriorates, said Foreign Minister Mahamoud Ali Youssouf. Youssouf warned on 2 April 2015 that the Houthis had installed heavy weapons on islands in the Bab-el-Mandeb strait, and he urged coalition forces to remove them, saying they endangered Djibouti and international shipping.
- Eritrea – In a statement, the Eritrean Foreign Ministry said it viewed the Yemeni crisis "as an internal matter". Eritrea denied allegations that it provided support to the Houthis. In late April, Eritrean President, Isaias Afwerki, visited Saudi Arabia for talks on bilateral relations and the situation in Yemen. The two countries reportedly reached a security and martial accord centered on counter-terrorism, illicit trade and maritime security in the Red Sea area, as well as averting "foreign interference" in Yemen's internal affairs.
- Ethiopia – Ethiopian Prime Minister, Hailemariam Desalegn, said his country stands with Sudan, a neighbour and member of the Saudi-led coalition in Yemen. He said the intervention was justified to protect the Yemeni government and defeat the Houthis.
- France – According to the Saudi newspaper, Arab News, the French Embassy in Riyadh released a statement reiterating its support of Hadi's government and concluding, "France stands by its partners in the region to restore stability and unity of Yemen." French foreign minister, Laurent Fabius, expressed his political support for the Saudi-led intervention during an official visit to Riyadh. In May 2019, however, French minister Jean-Yves Le Drian, urged Saudi Arabia and UAE to stop the "dirty war" in Yemen.
- Germany – Frank-Walter Steinmeier, the German foreign minister, said he "can understand" Saudi Arabia's decision to mount a military intervention, and acknowledged the operation had "support from the region" and was carried out at Yemeni President, Abd Rabbuh Mansur Hadi's, request. However, he said the crisis could not be solved by violence and urged a negotiated solution.
  - On 2 December 2015, the Federal Intelligence Service (the BND) warned that Saudi Arabia was at risk of becoming "a major destabilising influence in the Arab world", adding that Saudi Arabia's intervention in Yemen was driven by a desire to show that the country was "willing to take military, financial and political risks in order not to fall behind in regional politics".
- Indonesia – Religious Affairs Minister, Lukman Hakim Saifuddin, expressed concerns over the military intervention and hoped that it would end soon and wouldn't worsen.
- Iran – Foreign Minister Mohammad Javad Zarif called the military intervention a "dangerous development which will destabilize a region", and the Foreign Ministry demanded an immediate halt on all "military aggressions" in Yemen. Iran described and warned that Riyadh was taking a 'dangerous step', making clear that the Saudi deployment of a Sunni coalition against Shi'ite enemies would complicate efforts to end a conflict, and that it was likely to inflame the sectarian animosities fueling wars around the Middle East. A senior official said military intervention in Yemen is not an option for Tehran. "We demand an immediate stop to the Saudi military operations in Yemen," Mohammad Javad Zarif said in an interview with Iran's Arabic-language al-Alam news network, according to Press TV. According to Iran's official news agency, Iran's deputy foreign minister has asked the United Nations Secretary General to do everything possible to halt Saudi-led air strikes in Yemen immediately.
  - Supreme leader Ali Khamenei denounced the Saudi bombings, calling them acts of genocide. He went on to say that Saudi Arabia "will not emerge victorious in its aggression." Khamenei also compared Saudi-led airstrikes in Yemen to Israel's military operation in Gaza last summer.
- Iraq – Foreign Minister Ibrahim al-Jaafari expressed the Iraqi government's opposition to the intervention at an Arab League summit on 26 March 2015.
- Israel – On 29 March 2015, Israeli Prime Minister, Benjamin Netanyahu, criticized Iran's purported support for the Houthis, saying "the Iran-Lausanne-Yemen axis is very dangerous for humanity and needs to be stopped," in a reference to ongoing nuclear negotiations between Iran and the P5+1.
- Lebanon – Lebanese Prime Minister, Tammam Salam's, reaction to the intervention was described by Beirut-based newspaper The Daily Star as "ambiguous". Salam said at an Arab League summit on 28 March 2015 that Lebanon backs "any Arab stance that preserves Yemen's sovereignty and territorial integrity in addition to the cohesion of its social fabric". He also asked the Arab League not to involve Lebanon in any "regional struggles", an apparent reference to the conflict.
  - Seyed Hassan Nasrallah, the Secretary General of the Lebanese Hezbollah, in a 27 March 2015 speech strongly censured Saudi Arabia for its "aggression" against Yemen. He claimed that Saudis decided to invade Yemen because they realized they were losing their influence and control over the country. He praised Iran for "respecting the will of the regions people" and "sympathizing with their causes." He further accused Saudi Arabia of betraying the struggle against Israel as the main Arab cause. Nasrallah said Hezbollah would have joined the fight if it were against Israel, rather than Arabs.
  - Saad Hariri, former Prime Minister of Lebanon, praised Saudi King Salman for what he described as his "wise and brave" decision for military operation against the Houthi rebels. He blamed Iran's intervention in regional conflicts for the current turmoil in the region and supported Saudi Arabia for uniting the Arabs by the action it is carrying out in Yemen.
- Libya – Internationally recognised Libyan Prime Minister, Abdullah al-Thani, compared the conflict in Yemen to the fractious political situation in his country, and said "it is impossible to support legitimacy in Yemen and not do the same thing in Libya".
- Malaysia – Malaysia's Minister of Defence, Hishammuddin Hussein, has affirmed his country's support to Yemen's government and Saudi Arabia's measures to protect its security and sovereignty.
- New Zealand – New Zealand's Deputy-Foreign Minister, Bead Curry, supported Iran's plan for sending humanitarian aid, promoting cessation of hostilities, and national dialogue and unity government in the country on April 14, 2015.
- Oman – Despite being a member of the Gulf Cooperation Council, Oman has decided not to join the coalition, but is providing humanitarian aid to Yemenis. The Omani government has said that it had helped "nationals from 48 countries" leave Yemen and return to their home countries, and that it had taken in 2,695 refugees from Yemen as of mid-April 2015.
- Pakistan – After Saudi disclosures about Pakistan's participation, it was reported that Prime Minister Nawaz Sharif had re-affirmed that any risk to Saudi Arabia's territorial integrity would evoke a strong response from Pakistan, but that Pakistan is not directly participating in the military intervention. The Pakistani Parliament voted to adopt a policy of neutrality toward the conflict in Yemen, rebuffing a direct request from Saudi Arabia to commit troops and aircraft to the operation. However, on 17 April 2–15, Sharif said Pakistan would dispatch warships to enforce the arms embargo against the Houthis in support of the Saudi-led coalition.
  - Pakistan's left-wing opposition and the Pakistan Peoples Party has warned against participating in the conflict, advising the ruling conservative party, the PML(N), "to restore peace and not to participate in war." Pakistan Tehreek-e-Insaf, another major political party, has condemned the military intervention in Yemen.
  - In a press release by Foreign Office's spokeswoman, Tasnim Aslam, Pakistan has refused to be a part of any military campaign that divides the Muslim Ummah, hence adopting a strict neutrality in the conflict. A senior official in the Sharif ministry confirmed the "policy of neutrality" in the conflict, quoting: "Pakistan will not be involved in any action in Yemen itself but will provide support to the Saudis on their own soil if they are threatened."
  - Many in Pakistan protested against the Saudi-led military intervention in Yemen and popular public opinion is opposed to any support of the military intervention.
  - News media in Pakistan is speculating that Pakistan will not take part in the Sunni-led campaign against the Shiite Houthis in Yemen, as Pakistan has a sizable Shia following and enjoys cordial relations with Iran and China who strongly opposed the military intervention. In addition, Pakistan has stronger ties and historical relations with both Iran and Saudi Arabia, maintaining a balance with both states. In a session with Parliament, Defence Minister Khawaja Asif remarked: "We are not and will not fan any conflict that will divide the Muslim world on sectarian lines."
  - Although the Pakistan government repeatedly rejected the claims, numerous foreign news media reported that Pakistan was a participant in the coalition force and quoted an unnamed senior government official. Saudi Arabia asked for both "material and manpower" support from Pakistan— this request was made when National Security Adviser Sartaj Aziz, Special convey Tariq Fatemi, and Defence Minister Muhammad Asif paid an urgent visit to Saudi Arabia. Despite Saudi pressure on Pakistan, Prime Minister Sharif made an emergency trip to Turkey to discuss the issue and to address security issues in Yemen. According to the Foreign Ministry's officials, the Iranian Foreign minister Javed Zarif paid an urgent visit to Islamabad on 8 April 2015 to discuss the issue in Yemen.
  - Pakistan's parliament participated in a broader debate over the complexity and issues involving Saudi Arabia's request, and on 8 April 2016, the MQM– a liberal party– has spoken out against getting involved in Yemen with MQM senator, Tahir Hussain Mashadi, stating that the "aggressor" was Saudi Arabia and the victims were the Yemenis.
- Palestinian Authority – The Palestinian National Authority announced their support of, what they called, the Arab coalition and said a similar coalition should be created against Hamas who, it claimed, had illegally taken over the Gaza Strip during a 2007 coup.
  - Hamas – On 30 March 2015, Hamas announced its support of the Saudi-led coalition. Since at least 2021 however, Hamas has supported and recognized the Houthi movement.
  - Sabireen Movement, the group's leader who is a Shiite convert and supported by Iran condemned the Saudi intervention and called it "an attack on the Yemeni people"
- Russia – President Vladimir Putin sent a letter to the Arab League calling for an "immediate cessation of military activities" in Yemen. The Kremlin also recommended increased efforts to find a peaceful solution to the crisis. Russia introduced a draft resolution to the UN Security Council calling for a ceasefire on April 4, 2015.
- Somalia – President Hassan Sheikh Mohamud indicated that the Federal Government of Somalia supported the Saudi-led military intervention in Yemen. In response to calls from Yemeni President, Abd Rabbuh Mansur, for a collective counter-insurgency effort on the part of the Arab League states, Mohamud also noted that the nation would continue to stand by the Yemeni government. Foreign Minister of Somalia, Abdisalam Omer, reiterated his administration's support for the legitimacy of Yemen's incumbent government. He officially confirmed that the Somali federal government had permitted the coalition to use Somalia's airspace, territorial waters and land. It offered to share its stabilization-related experience with the Saudi-led forces. The approval came after Somalia had leased its airspace to the Gulf states with Bosaso (in the northeast) and Berbera (in the northwest) scheduled to be used by the coalition forces due to their proximity to Yemen.
  - Somaliland – The separatist administration of the Somaliland autonomous region in northwestern Somalia objected to the Somali federal government's decision, arguing that it was an "independent" administration and that the waters fell under its jurisdiction.
- Syria – The Syrian Foreign Ministry expressed "deep" concern over the situation in Yemen. While Syria stressed the need to respect the sovereignty of Yemen and its independence, it called on all Yemeni parties to embark on a dialogue to reach a political solution that meets the aspirations and will of the Yemeni people.
- Tunisia – the Foreign Minister, in a press statement, said that they are concerned about the serious developments in Yemen and urged for dialogues.
- Turkey – President Recep Tayyip Erdoğan said that Turkey supported the Saudi-led military operation in Yemen. He also criticised Iran's regional ambitions in both Yemen and Iraq. However, in a joint meeting between Iran and Turkey, both nations agreed that a political solution is needed in Yemen, despite being on opposing sides of the conflict.
- United Kingdom – The Foreign and Commonwealth Office announced support for the Saudi decision to intervene military in Yemen "following president Hadi's request for support". However the UK said it would not be providing military support, though it later emerged that the UK had sent military advisers to help direct coalition attacks.
- United States – A National Security Council spokeswoman said the US would work jointly with Saudi Arabia to provide military and intelligence support while not participating in "direct military action". President Barack Obama declared that he had authorized US forces to provide logistical and intelligence support to the operation against Houthis as a "Joint Planning Cell' with Saudi Arabia. US support has included UAV video feeds to aid Saudi airstrike targeting, refueling of Saudi fighter aircraft, and search-and-rescue support in the Gulf of Aden. Marie Harf, a spokeswoman for the U.S. State Department, said in April 2015, that the parties to the conflict should "end the fighting" and restart a political dialogue. In the wake of a leaked UN report highly critical of the coalition and of ongoing attacks on civilian targets, the US issued an "unusual" statement that criticized air strikes that killed an ambulance driver working with Doctors Without Borders and a journalist, while making "no mention" of Saudi Arabia or the coalition.

=== Others ===
- Red Cross – The International Committee of the Red Cross is worried by the recent escalation of violence in Yemen, and expressed concern on March 26, 2015 at reports of civilian casualties following air strikes in the capital Sanaa and other parts of the country. Edric Schweizer, head of the ICRC delegation in Yemen, stated "All parties involved in the current round of violence are bound by the rules governing the conduct of hostilities."
- Médecins Sans Frontières (Doctors Without Borders) have condemned airstrikes on multiple occasions. Ban Ki-Moon also condemned attacks on MSF facilities on 3 December 2015.
- International Crisis Group – The ICG concluded in a 27 March 2015 briefing that action by the UNSC to observe a prompt truce, with the aim of restoring the suspended negotiations, was needed. The ICG has also recommended priorities for negotiations, namely having Saudi Arabia persuade Abd Rabbuh Mansur Hadi to give up power and holding talks in neutral Oman.
- Oxfam – On April 19, 2015, international aid agency, Oxfam, condemned Saudi Arabia over airstrikes that it said had hit one of its warehouses containing humanitarian supplies in the Houthi northern stronghold of Saada.
- Amnesty International – Amnesty has said that the coalition's air strikes demonstrate an "appalling disregard" for civilian life, with some attacks amounting to war crimes.
- Reporters Without Borders – Reporters without borders condemned a strike in Sanaa on 20 April 2015 that caused the deaths of four employees of Al-Yemen Al-Youm TV and injured ten others. It also condemned attacks on journalists by pro-Houthi forces.
- Human Rights Watch criticized the UN Security Council repeatedly for "remaining almost silent on coalition abuses".
- UNESCO condemned the destructions by air strikes on the Old City of Sanaa, a UNESCO World Heritage Site, and other heavily populated areas.

== Evacuations and other actions ==
The Royal Saudi Navy evacuated diplomats and United Nations staff from Aden to Jeddah on 28 March 2015.

Pakistan dispatched two special PIA flights to evacuate some 500 stranded Pakistanis on 29 March 2015. Several UN staff members and Arab diplomats were also evacuated following the airstrikes.

The Indian government responded by deploying ships and planes to Yemen to evacuate stranded Indians. Foreign Minister Sushma Swaraj stated that since all the airports in Yemen were closed, they planned to bring people to the neighbouring country of Djibouti by ship, and from there to India by aircraft. India began evacuating hundreds of its citizens on 2 April 2015, via a commercial liner docked in Aden port. An air evacuation of Indian nationals from Sanaa to Djibouti was carried out on 3 April 2015, after the Indian government obtained permission to land two Airbus A320s at the airport. The Indian Armed Forces, in a rescue operation codenamed Operation Raahat, evacuated more than 4640 Indian nationals along with 960 foreign nationals from 41 countries. The operation ended on 11 April 2015.

A Chinese missile frigate docked in Aden on 29 March 2015 to evacuate Chinese nationals from Yemen. The ship reportedly deployed soldiers ashore on 2 April 2015 to guard the evacuation of civilians from the city. The Chinese frigate evacuated 225 foreign citizens from 10 different countries in what Reuters described as "the first time that China's military has helped other countries evacuate their people during an international crisis". China also evacuated 571 of its own nationals and eight foreigners who worked for Chinese companies in Yemen.

The Ethiopian Foreign Ministry said it would airlift its citizens out of Yemen if they requested to be evacuated. There were reportedly more than 50,000 Ethiopian nationals living and working in Yemen at the outbreak of hostilities.

Malaysia also planned to evacuate its 879 citizens from Yemen, according to its Foreign Minister, Anifah Aman, but it was unclear whether they would be moved out by air or land.

== Timeline of events ==
On 4 April 2015, the ICRC called for a 24-hour humanitarian ceasefire after the coalition blocked three aid shipments to Yemen. Russia also called for "humanitarian pauses" in the coalition bombing campaign, bringing the idea before the United Nations Security Council in a 4 April emergency meeting. However, Saudi Arabia's UN ambassador raised questions over whether humanitarian pauses are the best way of delivering humanitarian assistance.

On 7 April, China renewed calls for an immediate ceasefire.

On 10 April, Julien Harneis (UNICEF Yemen representative) said to CNN, "The humanitarian situation is worsening all the time, with increasingly limited access to water, basic sanitation and critical health services,". As a result, UNICEF sent antibiotics, bandages, syringes, IV sets and other medical supplies.

On 10 April, the Pakistani Parliament declined a Saudi Arabian request to join the coalition. The Parliament clarified the wish to maintain a neutral diplomatic stance.

On 14 April, the UN Security Council adopted a resolution placing an arms embargo on three top Houthi leaders, including Abdul-Malik al-Houthi, as well as Saleh and his son, Ahmed Ali Saleh. The embargo also covered their supporters and called on the Houthis to retreat and lay down arms. Other provisions in the resolution include appointing UN Secretary General, Ban Ki-moon, to "facilitate" the provision of aid, including humanitarian pauses. It also called on all involved parties to participate in peace talks in Riyadh. The resolution was sponsored by the Gulf States and Jordan, which held a rotating Security Council seat.

On 16 April, the UN Special Envoy to Yemen, Jamal Benomar, resigned, citing his failure to negotiate an end to the conflicts. Benomar brokered the post-Arab Spring transition in which Hadi replaced Saleh. Following the resignation, Secretary General Ban called for an immediate ceasefire to facilitate the delivery of aid.

On 16 April, a group of US- and UK-based Yemen scholars wrote an open letter, stating that the operation was illegal under international law and calling for the UN to enforce an immediate ceasefire.

On 17 April, Iran submitted to the United Nations a four-point peace proposal aimed at ending the conflict. The proposal called for an immediate ceasefire and end of all foreign military attacks, humanitarian assistance, a resumption of broad national dialogue and "establishment of an inclusive national unity government". Exiled Yemeni officials later rejected the deal, calling it a political manoeuvre. Russia confirmed its backing of the proposal and said that it would use its full capacity to further the plan.

The UN on 17 April called for 274 million US dollars in humanitarian aid to meet the needs of 7.5 million people over three months. The same day, Saudi Arabia pledged to fund the entire appeal. However, the UN agency responsible opted to keep the appeal open, stating that it "urged other donors to provide more support to meet increasing needs across the country."

On 18 April, the Chinese Foreign Ministry announced that general secretary of the Chinese Communist Party, Xi Jinping, had called King Salman and urged him to increase efforts to find a political solution to end the crisis.

On 19 April, Oxfam condemned Saudi Arabia over airstrikes it said hit one of its warehouses containing humanitarian supplies in Saada.

On 21 April, the Iranian Foreign Minister announced that he was hopeful that a ceasefire would be under effect later in the day.

Mauritanian diplomat, Ismail Ould Cheikh Ahmed, was nominated by Secretary General Ban to replace Jamal Benomar, who resigned on 16 April. His nomination was confirmed on 25 April.

On 24 April, the Organisation of Islamic Cooperation announced it would hold an extraordinary meeting to discuss the situation.

Aid groups came out against the air campaign: Amnesty International said some of the coalition's airstrikes "appear to have failed to take necessary precautions to minimize harm to civilians and damage to civilian objects". Reporters without Borders condemned a strike in Sanaa on 20 April that caused the deaths of four employees of Al-Yemen Al-Youm TV and injured ten others; it also condemned attacks on journalists by pro-Houthi forces.

On 24 April, thousands of Nigerians demonstrated in Kano following Friday prayers to denounce the Saudi attacks.

On 25 April, professor Sami Ramadani of London Metropolitan University claimed Hadi was violating Yemen's Constitution. Under article 35, "No organization, individual, group, political party or organization may establish forces or paramilitary groups for whatever purpose or under any name". Additionally, under article 68, "no other [non-state-established] armed force may enter the House premises or take positions near its entrances except at the request of the Speaker."

On 27 April, Benomar told The Wall Street Journal that Yemeni political parties had been close to agreeing on a final peace deal before the airstrikes started.

On 29 April, peace activist group "Women's Power to Stop War" demanded an end to the conflict and sent letters to over 10 embassies and representatives, denouncing the conflict following a plea by Yemeni activist, Amal Basha.

By the end of April, the US government was pressuring Saudi Arabia to end the airstrikes, with National Security Advisor, Susan E. Rice, saying, "There is no military solution to the crisis in Yemen, and the humanitarian situation will only worsen if the conflict continues." Also on 29 April, US State Department spokesperson, Marie Harf, said the US Secretary of State, John Kerry, and EU High Representative for Foreign Affairs, Federica Mogherini, had discussed the situation, with particular emphasis on pushing forward political negotiations.

On 30 April, the ICRC (Red Cross) and the World Food Program (WFP) said aid delivery had become difficult-to-impossible, with WFP suspending operations, due to ongoing fighting, air transport restrictions, and the destruction of Sanaa airport.

On 1 May, the UNSC held an emergency meeting, called by Russia, to discuss the crisis. The council did not agree on a Russian-drafted statement demanding an immediate ceasefire in what the Russian delegate called "amazing indecision." Diplomats said they rejected the Russian statement as they "needed time to consider the wording." A US official said the US was working directly with the Saudi government to facilitate aid delivery, and condemned Houthi and pro-Saleh fighters for failing to abide by an earlier UN resolution calling on them to end fighting. An unnamed diplomat told AFP that diplomats had agreed in principle with the Russian resolution, but failed to agree on the exact wording.

On 2 May, Kerry stated that the US, the UN, Saudi Arabia and the United Arab Emirates were working on peace negotiations between the government and the rebels.

On 4 May, the UN called on the coalition to stop attacking Sanaa Airport to allow delivery of humanitarian aid. ICRC head in Yemen, Cedric Schweizer, said "The harsh restrictions on importations imposed by the Coalition for the past six weeks, added to the extreme fuel shortages, have made the daily lives of Yemenis unbearable, and their suffering immense". WFP stated that its monthly fuel needs had increased from 40,000 to 1 million litres.

On 6 May, Kerry pledged to discuss the implementation of a humanitarian pause with Saudi officials. Kerry, on a visit to Djibouti, urged all sides "to comply with humanitarian law to take every precaution to keep civilians out of the line of fire."

On 7 May, after Saudi/US discussions, Saudi Arabia proposed a five-day ceasefire. Two Houthi leaders told CNN that they would meet soon to discuss the proposal. Hours later, coalition spokesman said that forces would continue "a harsh response" to Houthis' attacks on the areas along the Kingdom's southern border.

On 8 May, the Russian UN envoy said that he expected UN-brokered peace talks to resume quickly and warned that sending ground troops into Yemen would be "a reckless escalation". A UN official commented on the recently announced ceasefire saying that it would not be enough to accommodate Yemen's humanitarian needs stating that a UN-chartered fuel vessel was still waiting off the coast.

On 10 May, the UN Humanitarian Coordinator for Yemen stated that the attacks on Saada province were in breach of international law.

On 29 June, Secretary General Ban denounced a coalition airstrike that had hit a UN compound in Aden the previous day and requested a full investigation.

On 20 January 2016, Angus Robertson, the SNP's Parliamentary Group Leader, said the British Prime Minister, David Cameron, should admit to British involvement in Saudi Arabia's war in Yemen: "Isn't it time for the Prime Minister to admit that Britain is effectively taking part in a war in Yemen that is costing thousands of civilians lives and he has not sought parliamentary approval to do this?"

== See also ==
- Outline of the Yemeni crisis, revolution, and civil war (2011–present)
- Timeline of the Yemeni crisis (2011–present)
