= Yemeni peace process =

Attempts to resolve the crisis in Yemen

The Yemeni peace process refers to proposals and negotiations seeking to address the Yemeni crisis by arranging a transfer of power within the country, and later attempts to arrange a cease-fire in the Yemeni civil war. While initially unsuccessful, the reconciliation efforts resulted in presidential elections in February 2012. The violence in Yemen, however, continued during the elections and after, culminating in the seizure of power by the Houthis and an ensuing civil war.

The subsequent attempt made by Houthi insurgents to form a government under the name of "Supreme Political Council" has come under heavy condemnation from the international community. United Nations has officially described the act as "a clear violation of the Yemeni constitution"; denouncing the council for sabotaging the Yemeni peace process.

== Yemeni Revolution reconciliation ==
=== 2011 mediation attempts ===
In April, the Gulf Co-operation Council attempted to mediate an end to the crisis, drafting several proposals for a transition of power. Toward the end of the month, Saleh signaled he would accept a plan that would see him leave power one month after signing and provided for a national unity government in the lead-up to elections. Though some protesters ballyhooed the deal, criticizing provisions that granted the president immunity from prosecution and required the opposition to join with Saleh and his ministers in the national unity government, opposition leaders eventually agreed to sign it. By the end of the month, though, Saleh reversed course and the government announced he would not sign it, putting the GCC initiative on hold.

In early May, officials again indicated that Saleh would sign the GCC deal, and the opposition agreed to sign as well if Saleh signed it personally in his capacity as president. However, Saleh again backed away, saying the deal did not require his signature, and the opposition followed suit, accusing Saleh of negotiating in bad faith. Protests and violence across the country intensified in the wake of this second reversal by Saleh.

In late May, opposition leaders received assurances that Saleh would sign the GCC plan after all, and they signed the deal the day before the president was scheduled to ink it as well. But Saleh once again decided not to sign, and a brief but tense standoff occurred on 22 May when Saleh's supporters surrounded the embassy building of the United Arab Emirates in Sana'a, trapping international diplomats (including the secretary-general of the GCC) inside until the government dispatched a helicopter to ferry them to the presidential palace.

On 23 November 2011, Saleh flew to Riyadh in Saudi Arabia to sign the Gulf Co-operation Council plan for political transition, which he had previously spurned. Upon signing the document, he agreed to legally transfer the powers of the presidency to his deputy, Vice President Abdu-Rabbo Mansour al-Hadi within 30 days and formally step down by the 21 February 2012 presidential elections, in exchange of immunity from prosecution for him and his family.

=== Saleh step-down agreement and elections ===
On 21 January 2012, the Assembly of Representatives of Yemen approved the immunity law. It also nominated Vice President Hadi as its candidate for the upcoming presidential election. Saleh left Yemen on the next day to seek medical treatment in the United States, and is reportedly seeking exile in Oman.

A presidential election was held in Yemen on 21 February 2012. With a report claiming that it had 65 percent turnout, Hadi won 99.8% of the vote. al-Hadi was sworn in as president of Yemen on 25 February 2012, officially removing Saleh from power, who had ruled the country for 33 years. Saleh returned home at the same day to attend Hadi's presidency inauguration.

== 2015 ==
On 4 April 2015, the International Committee of the Red Cross called for a 24-hour ceasefire to deliver aid and supplies after the Saudi-led coalition blocked three aid shipments to Yemen. On 5 April, Reuters quoted a Houthi leader as saying the group would be willing to sit down for peace talks if the airstrikes stopped and a neutral party acted as mediator. On 7 April, China added its support of a ceasefire in Yemen, following an appeal by the ICRC and Russia for a humanitarian pause.

Despite Saudi Arabia asking for Pakistan's support to join the coalition, the Pakistan government also called for a ceasefire in order to help negotiate a diplomatic solution. Alongside Turkey, Pakistan has taken initiatives to arrange a ceasefire in Yemen. According to analysis written in U.S. News, Pakistan's strategic calculations firmly believes that if the Saudis enter into a ground war in Yemen – with or without Pakistani military – it will become a stalemate; therefore, Pakistan is increasing its efforts to potentially help engineer a face-saving solution to achieve a ceasefire and end the war.

On 12 April, Saudi Arabia rejected Iran's request about a ceasefire in Yemen. Saudi Foreign Minister Prince Saud al-Faisal said in the Saudi capital, Riyadh, at a news conference with his French counterpart Laurent Fabius, that "Saudi Arabia is a responsible for establishing legitimate government in Yemen and Iran should not interfere." Australia called for the ceasefire in Yemen, because of the civilian casualties numbers. On 16 April, Secretary-General Ban Ki-moon requested an immediate ceasefire in Yemen. Also he said all parties must stop war as soon as possible.

On 17 April, Iranian foreign minister Mohammad Javad Zarif submitted four-point Yemen peace plan to United Nations. In this letter he pointed to enormous civilian casualties and destruction of civilian infrastructure. He said the only way to stop the war is to require that Yemeni parties form a national unity government without any foreign military intervention.

In June 2015, a solution to ending the Saudi intervention in Yemen sought the participation of a Yemeni delegation to the Geneva peace talks; the delegation came under attack in the Geneva peace talks.

=== May 2015 cease-fire ===
A five-day ceasefire proposed by Saudi Arabia was accepted by the Houthis and their allies in the military on 10 May 2015. The ceasefire was intended to allow the delivery of humanitarian aid to the country. The temporary truce began on the night of 12 May to allow the delivery of food, water, medical, and fuel aid throughout the country.

On the fourth day of the truce, the fragile peace unraveled as fighting broke out in multiple southern governorates. At least three civilians in Aden and 12 in Taiz were killed on 16 May, despite the ceasefire. Agence France-Presse reported that "dozens" were killed in southern Yemen by the clashes, including 26 Houthi and 12 pro-Hadi fighters.

=== Omani Initiative ===
Around this same time in 2015 reports surfaced in the media suggesting that Oman, which is the only Middle Eastern Monarchy not taking part in the coalition and has a border with Yemen, has presented a 7-point plan to both Iran and Saudi Arabia. Oman has played a vital role as a bridge between Tehran and the West in the past to help in the nuclear negotiations and thus enjoy good relations with Iran as well as its GCC neighbors. It has also been suggested that Oman was responsible to mediate a 24-hour ceasefire although analysts doubt if Oman can help bring about more rigid negotiations.

The following parts constituted the planned initiative:

- The withdrawal of the Houthis and forces loyal to deposed president Ali Abdullah Saleh from all Yemeni cities and the return of military hardware and munitions seized from the Yemeni Army.
- The restoration of the president Abd Rabbo Mansour Hadi and the government of Khaled Bahah.
- Early parliamentary and presidential elections.
- An agreement signed by all Yemeni parties.
- The conversion of Ansarullah into a political party.
- An international aid conference attended by donor states.
- Yemen entering the Gulf Cooperation Council.

== 2016 ==
=== Kuwait Initiative ===
Kuwait hosted the Yemen peace talks for three months in April 2016. However, the negotiations broke down in August, after they failed to yield a deal between the parties involved in the war. A second Yemeni ceasefire attempt on 21 November 2016, collapsed within 48 hours.

== 2018 ==
The U.S. and U.K. put immense pressure on Saudi Arabia following the bombing campaign in Yemen and the brutal killing of Jamal Khashoggi, a Washington Post journalist. On 30 October 2018, US Secretary of State Mike Pompeo said "It is time to end this conflict, replace conflict with compromise, and allow the Yemeni people to heal through peace and reconstruction." Pompeo emphasized that the Houthi rebels must stop firing missiles at Saudi and the UAE, but he also added that "subsequently, coalition airstrikes must cease in all populated areas in Yemen," aiming at Saudi Arabia. Defense Secretary Jim Mattis said all the parties involved in the war need to take part in peace talks initiated by the UN within 30 days. On 10 November 2018, the U.S. announced it would no longer refuel coalition aircraft operating over Yemen. The Saudi-led coalition issued a statement confirming the decision, saying the cessation of aerial refueling was made at the request of the coalition due to improvements in their own refueling capabilities. The move was expected to have minimal impact on the Saudi effort. The U.S. still provides support for the Saudi-led intervention via weapons sales and intelligence sharing.

Many U.S. senators were upset with Trump's response on the murder of Khashoggi. The disapproval of the Trump administration's support then took another turn as U.S. senators advanced a motion to withdraw American support from the Saudi-led coalition fighting in Yemen. The senators voted 63–37 to take forward the bipartisan motion, giving a severe blow to Trump administration, which was in favor of Saudi Arabia.

== 2019 ==
The UN Mission to Support the Hodeidah Agreement, was initiated by the United Nations in Yemen. On 13 March 2019, the U.S. Senate voted 54–46 in favor of ending U.S. support for the Saudi-led war in Yemen and called on the President to revoke U.S. forces from the Saudi-led coalition. On 27 September, Kuwait reiterated its willingness to host the parties involved in the Yemen war for another round of peace talks, in order to seek a political solution to the prolonged crisis.

=== Riyadh Agreement on Yemen ===
On 5 November, a power-sharing deal, Riyadh Agreement on Yemen was signed between the Saudi-backed Yemeni government and the UAE-backed southern separatists, in the presence of Mohammed bin Salman, Mohammed bin Zayed, Abdrabbuh Mansur Hadi, Southern Transitional Council's chief Aidarus al-Zoubaidi and other senior officials. It was signed in Saudi Arabia and was hailed as a wider political solution to end the multifaceted conflict in Yemen. Despite the agreement, clashes between the STC and Hadi government forces took place in December.

== 2020 ==
=== 2020 ceasefire in response to the COVID-19 pandemic ===
After the United Nations urged both sides to pursue peace talks in order to respond to the COVID-19 pandemic in Yemen, the Saudi-led coalition called a unilateral ceasefire beginning 9 April at noon, to support efforts to mitigate the COVID-19 pandemic. However, despite pledging ceasefire in Yemen, the Saudi-led coalition carried out dozens of airstrikes in the span of a week. The Yemen Data Project stated that at least 106 Saudi-led airstrikes, across 26 raids in Yemen had been carried out by the Kingdom in just one week. On July 2, coalition fighter jets launched scores of airstrikes on several Yemeni provinces. The operation was a response to ballistic missile and drone launchings by the Houthis against Saudi Arabia.

In July 2020, Mahmoud Ahmadinejad said he would be prepared to mediate between the hostile parties in Yemen to end the war.

=== Prisoner Exchange ===
On 27 September 2020, the United Nations announced that the Iran-backed Houthi rebels and the Hadi government supported by the Saudi-led military coalition, agreed to exchange about 1,081 detainees and prisoners related to the conflict as part of a release plan reached in early 2020. The deal stated the release of 681 rebels along with 400 Hadi government forces, which included fifteen Saudis and four Sudanese. The deal was finalized after a week-long meeting held in Glion, Switzerland, co-chaired by UN Special Envoy for Yemen, Martin Griffiths. The prisoner-swap deal was done by the UN during 2018 peace talks in Sweden and both parties were agreed on several measures including the cease-fire in the strategic port city of Hodeida. A prisoner swap deal was made as part of the 2018 peace talks held in Sweden. However, the implementation of the plan clashed with military offensives from Houthis and the Saudi-led coalition, which aggravated the humanitarian crisis in Yemen, leaving millions suffering medical and food supply shortages.

== 2022 ==
=== UN brokered ceasefire ===
The UN brokered a two-month nationwide truce on 2 April 2022 between Yemen's warring parties, which included allowing fuel imports into Houthi-held areas and some flights operating from Sana'a airport to Jordan and Egypt. The UN announced on 2 June 2022 that the nationwide truce had been further extended by two months. United States welcomed the truce extension in Yemen, praising Saudi Arabia, Jordan, Egypt, and Oman in helping to secure the truce. In August 2022 the truce was renewed with commitment to ‘an expanded truce agreement as soon as possible’. Two weeks into the truce period, the Houthis signed an action plan with the UN that committed them to cease use of child soldiers.

== 2023 ==
On 20 March 2023, the United Nations and the International Committee of the Red Cross reported that the Yemeni government and the Houthis agreed to release 887 detainees, following 10 days of negotiations in Switzerland. Both parties also agreed to visitation rights in detention facilities and likely more prisoner swaps in the near future. Hans Grundberg, the UN's special envoy for Yemen said that things are finally moving "in the right direction" toward a resolution of the conflict. The possible end to a devastating war in the region comes after the recent Saudi-Iranian rapprochement mediated by China a week earlier. On 14 April 2023, former chief of staff Mahmoud al-Subaihi and intelligence chief and Hadi's brother Nasser were released by the Houthis as part of a prisoner swap with the Yemeni government.

Despite the Houthi involvement in the 2023 Israel–Hamas war, Saudi Arabia and Yemen continued to advance the U.N-led peace process with Yemen, which is largely controlled by the Houthis. But there is growing fear by the Gulf states that attacks by Houthis on cargo ships in the Red Sea could further endanger the signing of a peace agreement. In order not to jeopardise these negotiations, Arab nations in the area did not join Operation Prosperity Guardian, a multinational military entente to protect the important shipping route. The U.S. and European powers are actively interested in a de-escalation with Yemen but their efforts are equally challenged by these attacks. Additionally, the U.S. had accused Iran of directly supplying the Houthis with equipment that facilitates drone and rocket attacks on freighters in the Red Sea, highlighting the complexity of a regional peace agreement after the onset of the Israel-Hamas conflict.

== 2025–2026 ==
High-level diplomatic talks began in Oman in December 2025 with representatives from both governments to discuss a prisoner swap involving approximately 2,900 detainees. Following the groundwork laid in that discussion, the parties entered a 14-week negotiation period in Amman, Jordan to flesh out details. Both sides agreed on the specific names and identities of those to be released to ensure the exchange was balanced. This process was conducted under the oversight of U.N. Special Envoy to Yemen Hans Grundberg and representatives of the International Committee of the Red Cross (ICRC).

On May 14, 2026, following the negotiations, both governments sign a deal to release nearly 1,700 detainees in the largest prisoner swap in the war's history. The Houthi head of the Prisoner's Affairs committee said that 1,100 of the detainees are Houthi-affiliated, while the remaining 580 from the other side include seven Saudis and 20 Sudanese nationals. The ICRC was chosen to facilitate the repatriation process for both sides.

== See also ==
- Outline of the Yemeni crisis, revolution, and civil war (2011–present)
- Timeline of the Yemeni crisis (2011–present)
- List of Middle East peace proposals
- Israeli–Palestinian peace process
- Syrian peace process
