= Aden airport attack =

Aden airport attack may refer to:

- 1965 Aden airport attack
- 2020 Aden airport attack
