= Macharia Kamau =

Kenyan diplomat and environmentalist

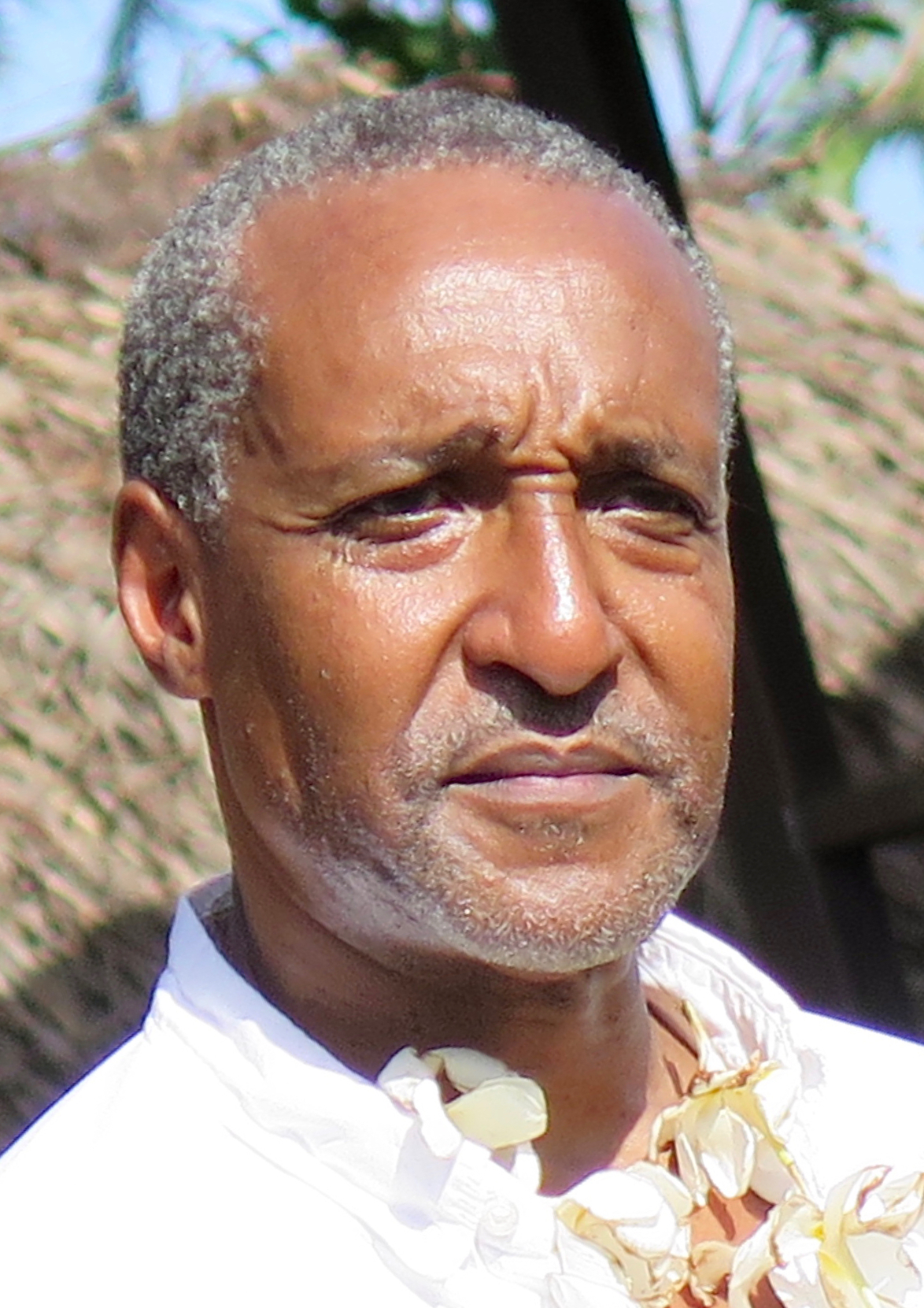
- Macharia Kamau, in 2016

Permanent Representative to the United Nations in New York of Kenya
- In office 2010–2018
- Succeeded by: Lazarus Ombai Amayo

21st President of UNICEF
- In office 2014
- Preceded by: Jarmo Viinanen
- Succeeded by: Maliha Lodhi

Personal details
- Born: 3 March 1958 (age 68)

Macharia Kamau (born 3 March 1958) was Kenya's Principal Secretary to the Ministry of Foreign Affairs (2019-2022). He previously served as Kenya's representative to the United Nations and as the former President of the UNICEF Executives Board.

== Early life and education ==
Kamau was born on 3 March 1958. In 1982, he graduated from the College of Wooster in Ohio, United States, with a B.A. in History, Economics, and Religion. In 1983, he obtained a Master of Education in Administration and Social Policy from Harvard University, in Cambridge, Massachusetts, United States. He lists specializations in "macro-economic policy management and in social policy and planning".

== Career ==
Kamau has had a long career in the service of the United Nations, including with UNICEF and the United Nations Development Programme (UNDP) in Africa, the Caribbean and New York. He previously served as the Permanent Representative of Kenya to the United Nations from 2010 up to 26th Jan 2018, and previously in Nairobi (2009-2010). He has also served on UN special assignments, and was President of the United Nations Children’s Fund (UNICEF) Executive Board (2014); President of UN Forests Forum (2011-2012), Co-Chair of the Ad hoc Working Group on Forest Financing (2010-2011), Vice President of the 67th Session of the UN General Assembly, Co-Chair of the General Assembly Working Group on the Sustainable Development Goals (SDGs) (2012-2014) and as co-facilitator of the post 2015 Development Agenda (2014-2015). He was also Chairperson of the United Nations Peacebuilding Commission.

In May 2016, United Nations Secretary-General Ban Ki-moon appointed Kamau and Mary Robinson, the former president of Ireland, as Special Envoy of the Secretary-General on El Niño and Climate, tasking them with calling attention to the 60 million people around the world affected by severe El Niño-linked drought and climate impacts and mobilising an integrated response that takes preparedness for future climatic events into account. In October 2016, President of the United Nations General Assembly Peter Thomson created a Sustainable Development Goals implementation team "in order to motivate actors at global, regional, national, and community levels" and appointed Kamau as the Special Envoy on Implementation and Climate Change. This team's tasks were to raise public awareness of the goals and their importance and to push for the implementation of the goals to the fullest extent possible by related agencies.

Ambassador Kamau was appointed the Principal Secretary of the Ministry of Foreign Affairs of Kenya in February 2018. He left (retired) from that position sometime during 2022. . On 22 March 2018, Kamau left his positions at the UN and announced his departure to the public via Twitter.

== Publications ==
Kamau is the co-author of Transforming Multilateral Diplomacy: The Inside Story of the Sustainable Development Goals published in February 2018.

== Political views ==
Kamau views that peace can not be had when countries do not respect each other's borders and institutions.

In 2018, Kamau criticized The New York Times and Financial Times on their coverage of Kenya and stated that he hoped they would take an audit on their editorial position on the country.
