= Virendra Dayal =

Indian civil servant and diplomat

Member of the National Human Rights Commission of India
- In office 16 November 1998 – 15 November 2003 Serving with V. S. Malimath (1998–1999); K. Ramaswamy (1998–2002); Sudarshan Agarwal (1998–2001); Sujata V. Manohar (2000–2003)
- Nominated by: Prime Minister of India-headed committee
- Appointed by: President of India
- President: K. R. Narayanan (1998–2002); A. P. J. Abdul Kalam (2002–2003)
- Vice President: Krishan Kant (1998–2002); Bhairon Singh Shekhawat (2002–2003)
- Chairperson: Ranganath Misra (1993–1996); M. N. Venkatachalliah (1996–1998)
- In office 12 October 1993 – 11 October 1998 Serving with M. Fathima Beevi (1993–1997); S. S. Kang (1993–1997); V. S. Malimath (1994–1998)
- Nominated by: Prime Minister of India-headed committee
- Appointed by: President of India
- President: Shankar Dayal Sharma (1993–1997); K. R. Narayanan (1997–1998)
- Vice President: K. R. Narayanan (1993–1997); Krishan Kant (1997–1998)
- Chairperson: M. N. Venkatachalliah (1998–1999); J. S. Verma (1999–2003); A. S. Anand (2003)

Chef de Cabinet and Under-Secretary-General of the United Nations
- In office 1982 – February 1993
- Appointed by: Secretary-General of the United Nations
- Secretary-General: Javier Pérez de Cuéllar (1982–1991); Boutros Boutros-Ghali (1991–1993)

Personal details
- Born: 29 January 1935 (age 91) Allahabad district, United Provinces of British India, British India (Now, Allahabad district, Uttar Pradesh, India)
- Occupation: Retired civil servant (Indian Foreign Service and United Nations civil service officer)
- Awards: Padma Bhushan (1992)

Virendra Dayal (born 29 January 1935) is a retired Indian Administrative Service officer and United Nations civil servant who served as Chef de Cabinet to Secretary General of the United Nations for more than a decade. He has served as the director of the Department of Political and Peacebuilding Affairs of the United Nations and as the special envoy who probed the allegations levelled against a number of India politicians including Natwar Singh, a former Minister of External affairs, in the Paul Volcker Committee report of 2005. A former Indian Administrative Service officer and a Rhodes Scholar of 1956 Dayal sat on the National Human Rights Commission of India as a member for two terms from 1998 to 2006. The Government of India awarded him the third highest civilian honour of the Padma Bhushan, in 1992, for his contributions to society.

== Early and personal life ==
Born on 29 January 1935 in the Allahabad district of the Indian state of Uttar Pradesh, Dayal did his early schooling at Sherwood College in Nainital. Subsequently, he graduated from St. Stephen's College at the University of Delhi in 1954 and continued there to secure his master's degree (MA) in history in 1956. He was selected for the Rhodes Scholarship for the year, which assisted him in pursuing his higher studies at University College at the University of Oxford, which he completed in 1958.

Dayal is married to Indira Gupta and the couple has two daughters, Divya and Jaya.

== Early career ==
Returning to India, Dayal entered the Indian Administrative Service and started his career as the district magistrate and collector (DM) of Nainital district, a Himalayan resort location. He is known to have worked for the rehabilitation of the refugees during his stint at Nainital and after two more DM postings at Rampur and Moradabad districts, he was transferred to the Government of India. In 1962, when Nobel laureate, V. S. Naipaul, and his wife, Patricia, visited India, Dayal hosted the Trinidadian and Tobagonian couple. At the centre, he was posted as a director in the now erstwhile Ministry of Community Development and Cooperation, a post he held till 1965 when he moved to the United Nations.

== United Nations days ==
Dayal's career at the United Nations (UN) started at the Office of the United Nations High Commissioner for Refugees (UNHCR) and a year later, he was appointed as the chief of the UHCR's Asia Desk at Geneva. In 1968, he was promoted as Deputy Regional Representative and in 1971, he became Regional Representative when he was a member of the UNHCR Focal Point Team, working for the rehabilitation of refugees who fled to India during the 1971 Bangladesh genocide. In 1972, he continued his work in the region as a part of the United Nations Relief Operations in Bangladesh for one more year, serving as the special assistant to the chief of mission, but, he returned to UNHCR in 1973, after being posted at the New York Office as Regional Representative. It was during his tenure there, he was involved in the airlifting of refugees in South Asia and in the boat people crisis of Vietnam in his capacity as the executive assistant of the High Commissioner on Refugees. In 1979, he was appointed as the director of the Office of Special Political Affairs, and three years later, he became Chef de Cabinet to Javier Pérez de Cuéllar, fifth Secretary-General of the United Nations.

As Chef de Cabinet, Dayal was given the rank of an under-secretary-general and he attended several diplomatic conferences including the 8th Summit of the Non-Aligned Movement in Harare in 1988. He continued at the post during the tenure of the next secretary-general, Boutros Boutros-Ghali, until his retirement from UN service in 1993. It was during Boutros-Ghali's incumbency that Dayal assisted the secretary-general in preparing An Agenda for Peace: Preventive diplomacy, peacemaking and peace-keeping, which was presented at the Summit Meeting of the Security Council on 31 January 1992. He was also involved in two diplomatic missions to South Africa, accompanying Cyrus Vance, former United States Secretary of State in July 1992 and then visiting the country as Special Envoy of the Secretary-General in September 1992. On these diplomatic missions, he met F. W. de Klerk and Nelson Mandela a number of times as a part of the negotiations to end apartheid in South Africa which were reported to have helped in arranging a meeting of the two leaders and in the eventual transition of power through the South African general elections of 1994.

In 1990, Dayal was proposed to become United Nations High Commissioner for Refugees by the UN secretary-general, Javier Pérez de Cuéllar, but, Dayal's nomination was blocked by the United States due to opposition from Ronald Reagan, the country's president. On this Dayal commented:

Japanese diplomat and academic, Sadako Ogata, was eventually appointed to the post of United Nations High Commissioner for Refugees.

== Post-United Nations career ==
Dayal returned to India in 1993 and soon was included in the Indian delegation to the Vienna Conference on Human Rights of June 1993 which precipitated the Vienna Declaration and Programme of Action. Later that year, he was appointed by the President of India—on the advice of a committee headed by the Prime Minister of India—as a member of the National Human Rights Commission of India (NHRC) for a five-year term; his term was extended by the president for a further of five years in 1998. His stint with NHRC allowed him to be a part of committees such as the United Nations Commission on Human Rights, the International Coordinating Committee of National Human Rights Institutions and the Asia Pacific Forum and to attend several international conferences on human rights, which included the World Conference against Racism of 2001, held in Durban, South Africa. He also served as a commissioner on the Carnegie Commission on Preventing Deadly Conflict, a UN appointed commission which submitted its final report in 1998.

In 2004, the Paul Volcker Committee set up by Kofi Annan, then Secretary-General of the United Nations, reported that some Indian politicians were beneficiaries in the Iraq Oil-for-Food Programme, in repose to this, the Government of India set up a machinery with Dayal, as a special envoy, to liaise with the United Nations agencies and probe the alleged involvement of Indian politicians including Natwar Singh, Minister of External Affairs at the time. He reportedly submitted four notes of his findings in 2005 and 2006, based on 1,200 pages of documents received from the United Nations, but, the reports were never published as the Supreme Court of India, after protracted litigation, accepted the contention of the Prime Minister's Office that the contents could only be used for investigation of possible violations of law.

Dayal is currently serving as the chairperson of the scholarship selection committee of Inlaks Shivdasani Foundation, and is the chair of the board of trustees of Rajeshwar Susheela Dayal Charitable Trust.

== Honours ==
- Dayal was conferred the Padma Bhushan, India's third highest civilian honour, for his contributions in the field of civil service by the president of India in the year 1992.
- Dayal was a member of the UN Focal Point Team of the United Nations High Commissioner for Refugees which was awarded the Nobel Peace Prize in 1981 for its efforts in handling the refugee crisis in the wake of the 1971 Bangladesh genocide.

== See also ==
- 1971 Bangladesh genocide
- Vietnamese boat people
- United Nations High Commissioner for Refugees
- Paul Volcker Committee
- Cyrus Vance
- Special Envoy of the Secretary-General
