= Saudi Development and Reconstruction Program for Yemen =

Saudi Arabian non-profit organization

- البرنامج السعودي لتنمية وإعمار اليمن
- Abbreviation: SDRPY
- Formation: 2018; 7 years ago
- Founder: King Salman
- Purpose: Development, humanitarian, economic
- Headquarters: Riyadh, Saudi Arabia
- General Supervisor: Mohammed Saeed Al-Jaber
- Website: sdrpy

The Saudi Development and Reconstruction Program for Yemen (SDRPY) (Arabic: البرنامج السعودي لتنمية وإعمار اليمن) is a Saudi non-profit organization established in 2018 to support the reconstruction and development of Yemen. It aims to provide economic and development assistance across various sectors in the country.

== Founding ==
SDRPY was launched in May 2018 through a royal decree by King Salman bin Abdulaziz Al Saud. It operates under a comprehensive development agreement between Saudi Arabia and Yemen, focusing on transitioning from humanitarian relief to sustainable development.

== Staff and Presence ==
The SDRPY is led by the Saudi ambassador to Yemen, Mohammed Saeed Al-Jaber. Its staff comprises a select group of Saudi and Yemeni engineers and development specialists. The organization is headquartered in Riyadh and has opened several offices in various Yemeni governorates.

== Program Areas ==
SDRPY's areas of focus include:

-Infrastructure: Rebuilding and restoring critical infrastructure, such as roads, land ports, airports, and seaports.

-Healthcare: Enhancing healthcare services by constructing and equipping hospitals, clinics, and medical centers, providing medical supplies, and training healthcare workers.

-Education: Constructing and renovating schools, supplying educational materials, and providing teacher training to ensure that Yemeni children have access to quality education.

-Agriculture: Supporting the agricultural sector by providing equipment, seeds, and training to farmers, thereby boosting food production and contributing to food security.

-Water and Sanitation: Developing and restoring water supply and sanitation systems to provide clean drinking water and improve hygiene standards in Yemen.

-Energy: Restoring and expanding the electricity grid, including renewable energy projects, to provide reliable power to homes, businesses, and public facilities.

-Economic Recovery: Facilitating economic recovery by supporting small and medium-sized enterprises (SMEs), creating job opportunities, and encouraging investment in various sectors.

-Governance and Capacity Building: Strengthening governance institutions and building the capacity of Yemeni government officials.

== Key Projects and Achievements ==
Since its inception, the SDRPY has implemented 229 development projects and initiatives in Yemen across eight sectors. In 2022, it was the largest non-UN organization globally contributing to Yemen's development, according to the United Nations Financial Tracking Platform (FTS).

=== Notable Achievements ===
- Healthcare: Establishing the King Salman Medical and Educational City in Al-Maharah, Kidney Dialysis Centers, operating rooms, and intensive care units; equipping hospitals with medical equipment; operating Prince Mohammed bin Salman Hospital in Aden.
- Education: Establishing and equipping over 20 model schools, a rehabilitation center for children with disabilities, and the Gifted Complex in Marib; developing the University of Saba Region; supporting students with transportation and textbooks.
- Transportation: Rehabilitating Al-Ghaydah Regional Airport, Aden International Airport, Al-Abar Highway in Marib and Hadramawt, Hayjat Al-Abed Road in Taiz, and internal roads in Aden and Al-Mahrah.
- Government Institutions: Establishment of the Counterterrorism Headquarters in Al Maharah and 4 police stations in Socotra.

== Partnerships ==
SDRPY collaborates with various partners at the local, regional, and international levels, including the Yemeni government, non-government and UN agencies, ministries, development funds, local authorities, and regional and international development organizations.
