= Michael Keating (UN official) =

Former United Nations official (born 1959)

Michael Keating (born 1959) is the executive director of the European Institute of Peace, an independent conflict resolution organisation based in Brussels, with activities in fifteen countries in Africa, the Middle East, Eastern Europe, Central Asia, and Latin America. He was the Special Representative of the Secretary-General for Somalia and Head of the United Nations Assistance Mission in Somalia (UNSOM), from January 2016 until September 2018.

== Early life and education ==
Keating was born in 1959 in Kampala, Uganda, and raised in Africa. He has a Master of Arts in history from the University of Cambridge.

== Career ==
Keating began his international career as Special Assistant to Sadruddin Aga Khan in Geneva 1985, working on diverse issues including nuclear nonproliferation, refugees and displacement, UN reform, environmental protection, and religious tolerance. After field assignments in Afghanistan and Pakistan, he was Senior Advisor to the Administrator of the United Nations Development Programme (UNDP) Mark Malloch Brown in New York from 1999 until 2001. He then moved to the UN's political mission, UNSCO, in Jerusalem/Gaza. He was the UN Resident Coordinator in Malawi from 2004 until 2008. Within the United Nations system, he also had assignments in Geneva, New York City, Peshawar, Islamabad, and Kabul.

From 2008 to 2010, Keating served as the Executive Director of the Africa Progress Panel, a policy group chaired by former United Nations Secretary General Kofi Annan.

Returning to the United Nations, Keating was the Deputy Special Representative of the Secretary-General (under the leadership of Staffan de Mistura and subsequently Ján Kubiš) and the UN Resident and Humanitarian Coordinator in Afghanistan from 2010 to 2012, and later headed the UN team that developed the "Human Rights Up Front" plan of action (2012/13).

Between 2012 and 2015, Keating worked as an advisor to a number of conflict mediation bodies, including Inter Mediate and Search for Common Ground. During part of that time, he served as Senior Advisor to the Secretary-General's Special Envoy to Syria from 2014 until 2015.

In 2015, Keating was appointed an associate director at Chatham House in London, where he had initiated and directed a number of projects on topics including Afghanistan, natural resources and conflict, the Moving Energy Initiative, and humanitarian engagement with non-state armed groups, before taking up the role as UN Special Representative to Somalia. In 2019, he was awarded a CMG for services to international diplomacy, conflict prevention, and human rights.

== Other activities ==
Keating has served as a trustee, board member or ambassador for nonprofit bodies including Afghan Connection, Afghan Research and Evaluation Unit, the Ashden Awards, and Theatre for a Change].

== Selected works ==
Keating has written for a wide variety of journals, newspapers, and other publications. Selected academic works include:

- Dilemmas of Humanitarian Assistance in Afghanistan (1998) in "Fundamentalism Reborn?" Ed William Maley, New York University Press 1998
- Aid, Diplomacy and Facts on the Ground – The Case of Palestine (2005) Edited with Anne Le More and Robert Lowe, Chatham House/Brookings
- Counting the Cost of Corruption in Malawi: A Perspective from the Field (2007) Pacific McGeorge Global Business and Development Law Journal, Vol 20.
- Input Subsidies to Improve Smallholder Maize Productivity in Malawi: Towards an African Green Revolution (2009) with Glenn Denning, Jeffrey Sachs, et al. in PLoS Biology
- "An Afghan Write Off Is Not an Option" The New York Times, January 2013
- "Real Security in Afghanistan Depends Upon People's Basic Needs Being Met" The Guardian, January 2013
- Addressing Natural Resource Conflicts (2015) with Oli Brown, Chatham House, 2015.
- Countering Terrorism and Violent Extremism (2015) Paper for the Council of Councils Annual Conference, Council of Foreign Relations
- Military and Civilian Assistance to Afghanistan 2001–14: An Incoherent Approach (2015) with Barbara Stapleton, Chatham House
- "Aid Agencies Must Re-wire their Approach to Refugees' Energy Needs" The Guardian, June 2015
- The Contribution of Human Rights to Protecting People in Conflict (2016) with Richard Bennett in "Protection of Civilians" (Ed Haidi Wilmot et al.), Oxford University Press
- The World Today. Daily Challenges of the UN Chief in Somalia. June 2016
- Towards a Principled Approach to Engagement with Non-state Armed Groups for Humanitarian Purposes (2016) with Patricia Lewis, Chatham House
- War and Peace in Somalia: National Grievances, Local Conflict and Al-Shabaab (Hurst/OUP 2018; co-editor with Matt Waldman)
- The Politics of Security in Somalia (2018) with Sagal Abshir (New York University Centre on International Co-operation)
