= Mark Lowcock =

Sir Mark Lowcock KCB
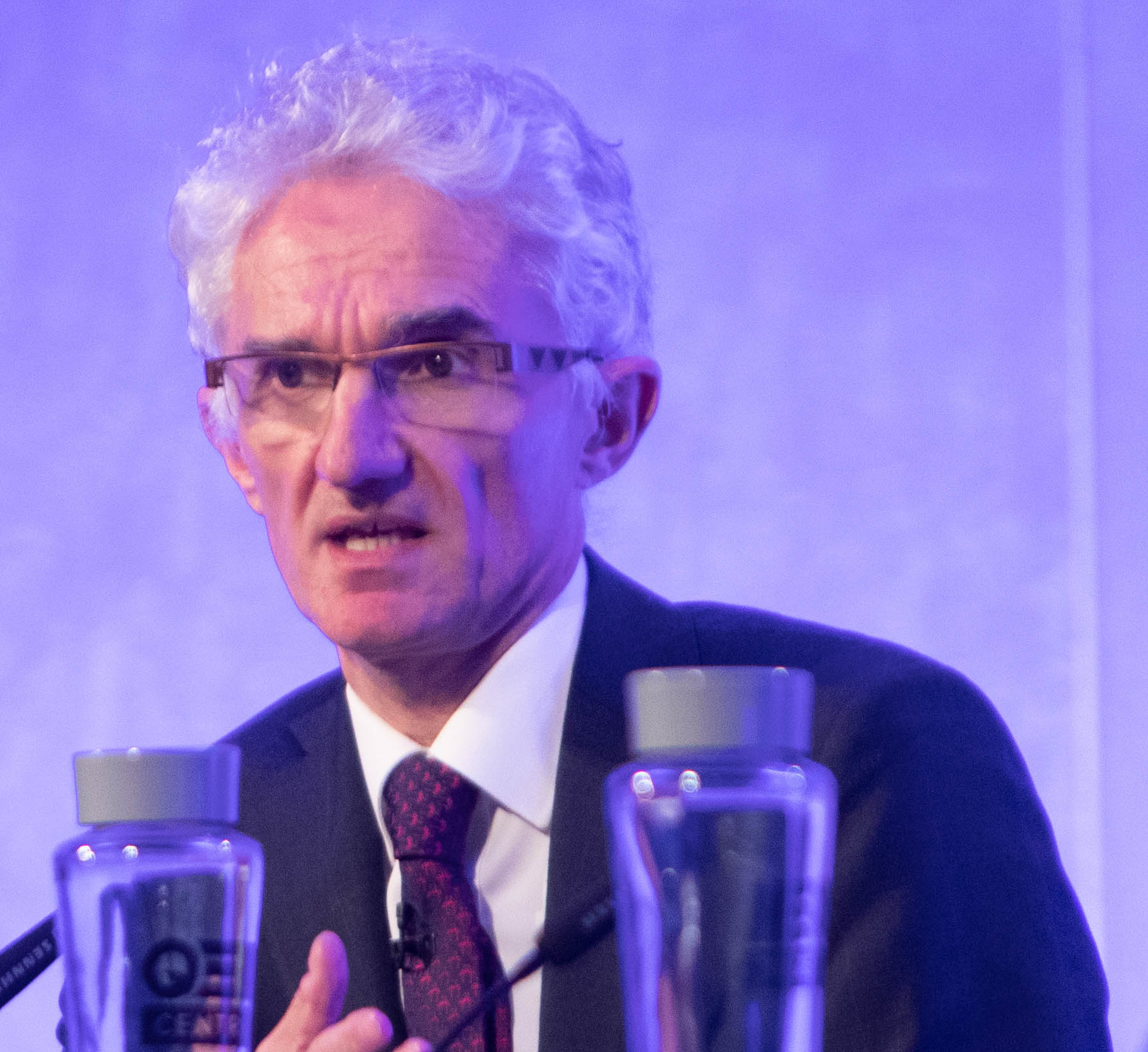
- Lowcock in 2018

United Nations Under-Secretary-General for Humanitarian Affairs and Emergency Relief Coordinator
- In office 12 May 2017 – 19 July 2021
- Secretary-General: António Guterres
- Preceded by: Stephen O'Brien
- Succeeded by: Martin Griffiths

Permanent Secretary of the Department for International Development
- In office 9 June 2011 – September 2017
- Monarch: Elizabeth II
- Prime Minister: David Cameron; Theresa May

Personal details
- Born: Mark Andrew Lowcock; 25 July 1962 (age 63)
- Spouse: Julia Watson
- Children: 3
- Education: Culford School
- Alma mater: Oxford University; Birkbeck College; Boston University
- Occupation: Economist, accountant

Sir Mark Andrew Lowcock KCB (born 25 July 1962) served as the United Nations Under-Secretary-General for Humanitarian Affairs and Emergency Relief Coordinator (the head of the United Nations Office for the Coordination of Humanitarian Affairs) between 2017 and 2021. Prior to his appointment by United Nations Secretary-General António Guterres on 12 May 2017, Lowcock was the Permanent Secretary of the Department for International Development (DFID) from June 2011 to September 2017.

As of April 2025 his main role is as Chair of St George's, Epsom and St Helier University Hospitals and Health Group. He has been elected President of the Chartered Institute of Public Finance and Accountancy with effect from June 2025. He is also a Trustee/Director and vice-chair of The Howard Partnership Trust, a multi-academy trust of schools (including for children with learning disabilities) in Surrey.

From November 2024 to April 2025 he was a Richard von Weizsäcker Fellow at the Robert Bosch Academy in Berlin. He is a visiting professor in practice at the Department of International Development at the London School of Economics. Between 2021 and 2024 he was a Senior Fellow at the Center for Global Development in Washington, DC.

== Early life and education ==
Lowcock attended Culford School in Suffolk before attending Oxford University, where he graduated with a degree in economics and history. He was later awarded a Master's degree in economics from Birkbeck College, University of London, before moving to Boston to study economics and business as a graduate fellow. He is a qualified accountant and a member of the Chartered Institute of Public Finance and Accountancy.

== Professional career ==
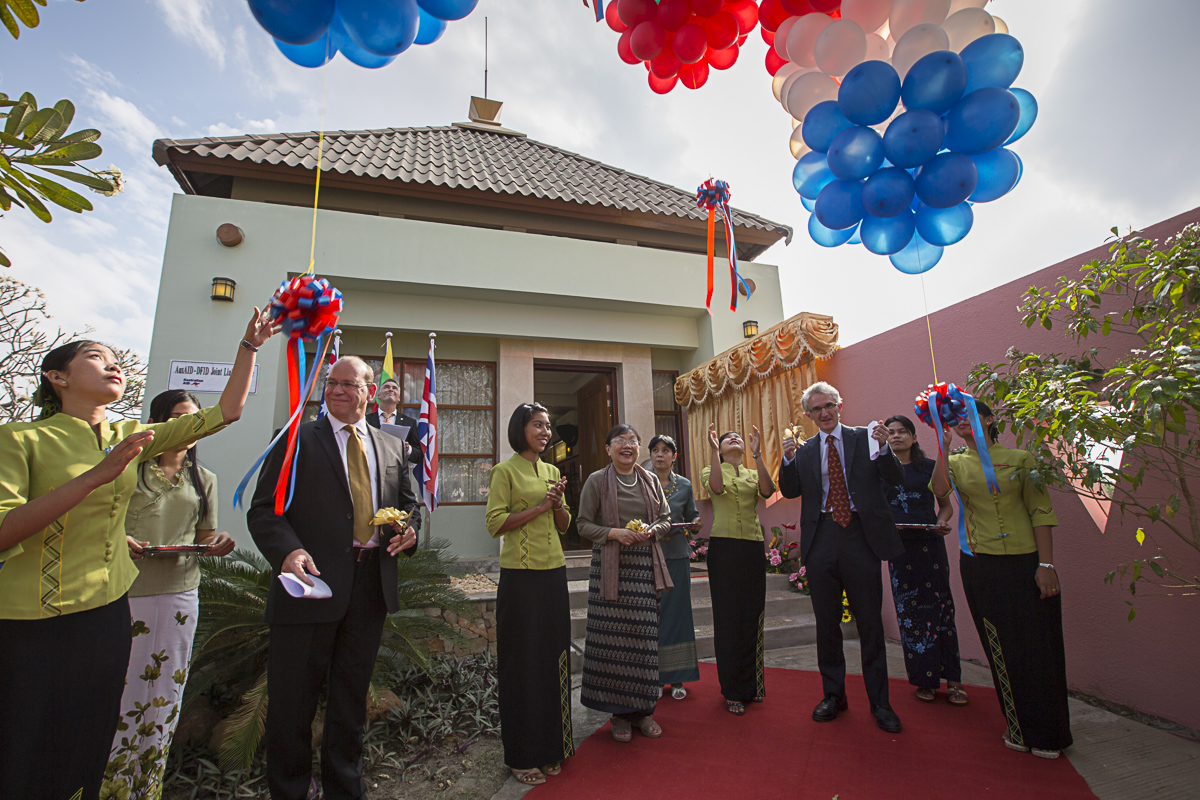
Lowcock at a DFID-Australian Aid Joint Liaison Office in Naypyidaw, Myanmar, 2013

=== Career in the UK ===
Lowcock joined the then Overseas Development Administration in 1985. He was the private secretary to Minister for Overseas Development Baroness Chalker of Wallasey from 1992 to 1994, the deputy head and head of the Department for International Development Regional Office for Central Africa from 1994 to 1997, the head of European Union Department from 1997 to 1999, the head of the Regional Office for East Africa, the director of finance and corporate performance from 2001 to 2003, the director general of corporate performance and knowledge sharing from 2003 to 2006, the director general of policy and international from 2006 to 2008, the director general of country programmes from 2008 to 2011.

Lowcock was appointed Permanent Secretary of the Department for International Development on 9 June 2011. He oversaw the department during the period in which the UK increased its aid budget to 0.7% of Gross Domestic Product. World leaders first pledged to meet the 0.7% target 35 years ago in a 1970 General Assembly Resolution.

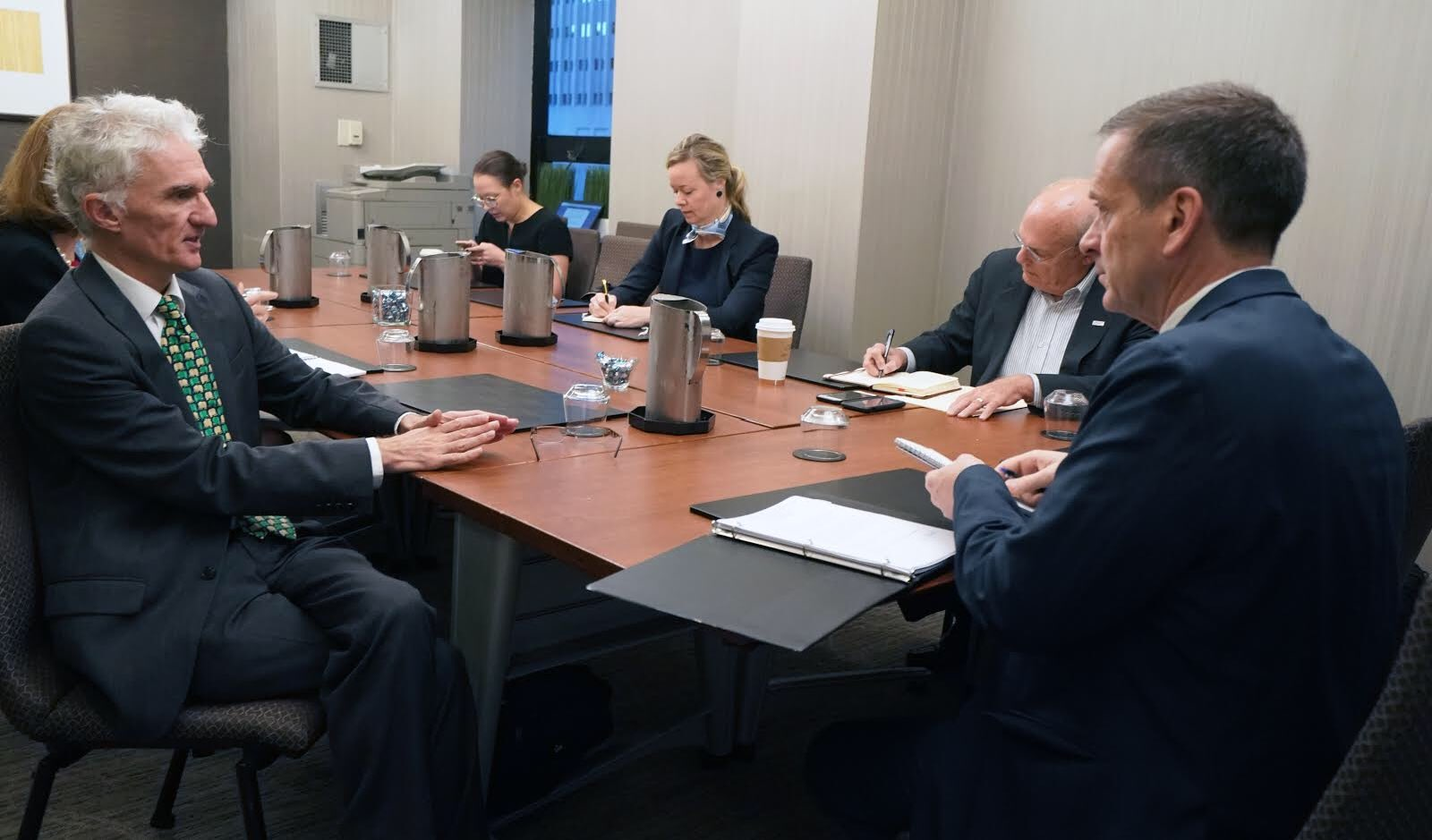
USAID Administrator Mark Andrew Green meeting Lowcock in 2019

=== Career with the UN ===
As the under-secretary-general and emergency relief coordinator (USG/ERC), he was responsible for the oversight of all emergencies requiring United Nations humanitarian assistance. He also acted as the central focal point for governmental, intergovernmental and non-governmental relief activities. The ERC also leads the Inter-Agency Standing Committee (IASC), a unique inter-agency forum for coordination, policy development and decision-making involving the key United Nations and non-United Nations humanitarian partners. In a country affected by a disaster or conflict, the ERC may appoint a humanitarian coordinator (HC) to ensure response efforts are well organized. The HC works with government, international organizations, non-governmental organizations and affected communities

From 2019, Lowcock was a member of the World Economic Forum High-Level Group on Humanitarian Investing, co-chaired by Børge Brende, Kristalina Georgieva and Peter Maurer.

In his role as the UN's humanitarian chief Mark Lowcock coordinated the COVID-19 Global Humanitarian Response Plan (GHRP). The GHRP was the international community's primary fundraising vehicle to respond to the humanitarian impacts of the virus in low- and middle-income countries and support their efforts to fight it. Nearly 250 million acutely vulnerable people across 63 countries were covered by the updated GHRP with needs totaling $10.3 billion. Activity funded by the GHRP included the delivery of laboratory equipment to test for the virus, and treat those infected, the installation of handwashing stations in camps and settlements, public health information campaigns on how to prevent community transmission, the provision of personal protective equipment (PPE) for front-line medical workers, training for support services around sexual violence and intimate partner violence, the delivery of food and nutrition programmes, and the creation of airbridges across Africa, Asia and Latin America for the movement of humanitarian workers and supplies.

== Publishing career ==
Lowcock has been a frequent media commentator on humanitarian issues. He has written opinion articles for the Washington Post, the Financial Times, the Telegraph, the Times, the Guardian, CNN and others. He has also published three books. In August 2020 Troubador Publishing announced the release in January 2021 of Lowcock's book Ten Generations, which they describe as "an extraordinary piece of social and family history". Gordon Brown praised the book as "... a great achievement ..... eminently readable".

Lowcock wrote about his time at the UN in a book, Relief Chief: A Manifesto for Saving Lives in Dire Times, published by the Center for Global Development on 17 May 2022. Rory Stewart described it as "A scrupulously honest, thoughtful testimony on what it takes to fight for effective humanitarian relief by one of the most distinguished international civil servants. Never preaching, avoiding jargon, alert to politics, nuance, and practicality, Lowcock draws strong, impressive, and wise conclusions on how the world could improve its response to the mounting tragedies which surround us."

In October 2024, his book, co-authored with Ranil Dissanayake, titled "The Rise and Fall of the Department for International Development," was published. It discusses Britain's international development policies from the late 1990s to the early 2020s. Bill Gates said, "This book serves as an important reminder that the world has made incredible progress improving lives of the poorest people - and can do so again."

== Other activities ==
- Member, Global Preparedness Monitoring Board (WHO pandemic board)
- International Gender Champions (IGC), Member
- Fellow, Birkbeck College
- Fellow King's College School, Wimbledon
- President, British Association of Former UN Civil Servants

In January 2022 Lowcock was appointed to chair a Public Inquiry into the Sheffield street tree dispute. The inquiry held live-streamed public hearings in the autumn of 2022. A comprehensive report was published in March 2023 and received wide publicity.

== Recognition ==
In 2011, Lowcock was appointed Companion of the Order of the Bath (CB). In the 2017 New Year Honours, he was appointed Knight Commander of the Order of the Bath (KCB) for public service, particularly to International Development.

== Personal life ==
Lowcock is married to Julia Watson and has three children.

Positions in intergovernmental organisations
Preceded by Stephen O'Brien ( (United Kingdom) )	Under Secretary General for Humanitarian Affairs and Emergency Relief Coordinator; 2017–2021	Succeeded by Martin Griffiths ( (United Kingdom) )
