= Maria Francesca Spatolisano =

Italian diplomat

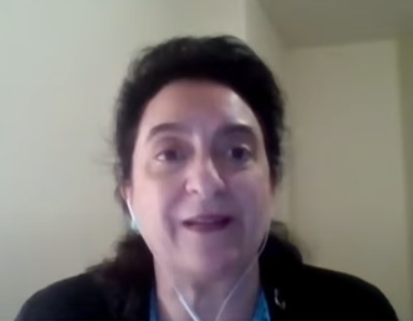
- Speaking at the World Economic Forum's Global Technology Governance Summit 2021

Assistant Secretary-General for Policy Coordination and Inter-Agency Affairs in the UN Department of Economic and Social Affairs
- Incumbent
- Assumed office December 2018

Personal details
- Education: University of Florence
- Occupation: Diplomat

Maria Francesca Spatolisano is a diplomat of Italian citizenship who has been serving as Assistant Secretary-General for Policy Coordination and Inter-Agency Affairs in the Department of Economic and Social Affairs by United Nations Secretary-General António Guterres since December 2018, succeeding Thomas Gass.

== Early life and education ==
Spatolisano earned a Doctorate in Law from the University of Florence.

== Career ==
A civil servant for the European Commission since 1985, Spatolisano was the European Union Ambassador to the OECD and UNESCO, Monaco and Andorra and was a member of the Delegation of the European Union to the United Nations.

When Chilean diplomat Fabrizio Hochschild Drummond was suspended from his role as the Secretary-General's Envoy on Technology in 2021, Spatolisano ran his office alongside her other duties.
