= List of ambassadors of Saudi Arabia to Yemen =

Coordinates: 12.809621°N 45.032222°E

Ambassador of Saudi Arabia to Yemen
- سفير خادم الحرمين الشريفين لدى اليمن (Ambassador of the Custodian of the Two Holy Mosques to Yemen)
- Coat of Arms of Saudi Arabia
- Incumbent; Mohammed Al-Jaber since September 2014
- Inaugural holder: Sheikh Mohammed 'Ubaikan
- Formation: 1958

The List of Saudi ambassadors to Yemen lists the ambassadors from Saudi Arabia to Yemen. Nine ambassadors served between 1958 and 2019. Mohammed Al-Jaber is the most recent ambassador. He resides in Aden, Yemen's capital.

== List of representatives ==
Diplomatic accreditation	Ambassador	Observations	King of Saudi Arabia	List of heads of government of Yemen	Term end
1958	Sheikh Mohammed 'Ubaikan	San'a Yemen: Sheikh Mohammed 'Uba kan, San'a.	Saud of Saudi Arabia	Hassan bin Yahya	1961 no mate
1976	Sheikh Moussaid bin Ahmed Al-Sudairi	Mosa'ed al Sodairi, Sheikh Mosaed al Sodairi, Sheikh Mosa'ed al Sodairi, Sheikh, Mosaed al Sodairi.	Faisal of Saudi Arabia	Kadhi Abdullah al-Hagri	
1984	Mahmoud Bahrrawee		Fahd of Saudi Arabia	Abdul Aziz Abdul Ghani	
1996	Ali bin Muhammad al-Qufaidi	On April 1, 1992, The Saudi ambassador to Yemen, 'Ali bin Muhammad al-Qufaydi, was held hostage for 18 hours by an armed Yemeni who gained entry to the Saudi Embassy in Sana'a, Yemen. The incident ended peacefully.	Fahd of Saudi Arabia	Haidar Abu Bakr al-Attas	
January 1, 1995	Ali Al-Gufeidi		Fahd of Saudi Arabia	Abdul Aziz Abdul Ghani	
January 1, 2002	Muhammad al-Qahtani	Muhammad Al-Qahtani	Fahd of Saudi Arabia	Abdul Qadir Bajamal	
April 26, 2006	Ali bin Mohammed Al-Hamdan	Mohamed Al-Hamdan From 2010 to 2011 Mr.Abdullah Mohamed Al-Hamdan was the 3rd Secretary in London.	Fahd of Saudi Arabia	Abdul Qadir Bajamal	March 22, 2007
September 1, 2014	Mohammed Saeed Al-Jaber	Jaber was appointed ambassador in 2014, just ten days before the Houthi takeover in Yemen in September 2014.	Fahd of Saudi Arabia	Mohammed Basindawa	February 14, 2015
February 26, 2015	Mohammed Saeed Al-Jaber	The Saudi ambassador to Yemen relocated the embassy from Sana'a to Aden.	Salman of Saudi Arabia	Khaled Bahah	

== List of representatives to Yemen Arab Republic ==
The Yemen Arab Republic, also known as North Yemen or Yemen (Sana'a), was an independent country from 1962 to 1990 in the western part of what is now Yemen. Saudi Arabia aided royalist partisans of the Mutawakkilite Kingdom against supporters of the Yemen Arab Republic until 1970, when Faisal of Saudi Arabia recognized the republic. Thereafter, the Saudi government maintained diplomatic relations. The Yemen Arab Republic united with the People's Democratic Republic of Yemen (commonly known as South Yemen), on May 22, 1990, to form the current Republic of Yemen.

Diplomatic accreditation	Ambassador	Observations	King of Saudi Arabia	List of heads of government of Yemen Yemen Arab Republic	Term end
1978	Sheikh Muhammad Alaki		Khalid of Saudi Arabia	Muhammad Ali Haitham	
1984	Mowaffak A. Al-Delaigan		Fahd of Saudi Arabia	Muhammad Ali Haitham	
