= 1965 Aden airport attack =

Grenade attack in Yemen

Aden Airport attack
- Part of Aden Emergency
Date	17 September 1965
Location	Aden

Belligerents
United Kingdom	National Liberation Front; Front for the Liberation of Occupied South Yemen

Commanders and leaders
United Kingdom Unknown	(Yemen) Unknown

Strength
unknown	unknown

Casualties and losses
9 wounded	unknown

The Aden Airport attack was a grenade attack which took place on 17 September 1965 and resulted in the injury of nine people. The United Kingdom accused the attackers of being "externally controlled", referring to Gamal Abdel Nasser's Republic of Egypt. The attack prompted the UK to suspend the constitution of the Aden Protectorate on 25 September, in an attempt to put an end to the violence. High Commissioner of Aden Richard Turnbull thus governed the protectorate alone under the suspension order signed by Queen Elizabeth II.
