= European Institute of Peace =

Non-profit public foundation

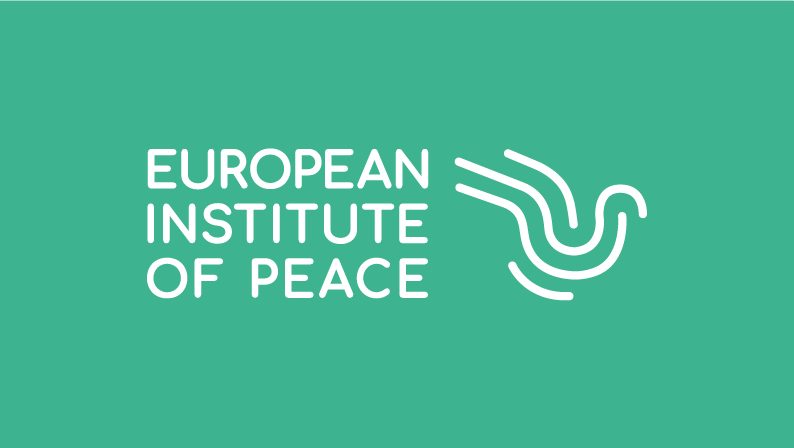
- Formation: 2014
- Headquarters: Tweekerkenstraat/Rue des Deux Eglises 25, Brussels, Belgium
- President of the Board of Governors: Helga-Maria Schmid
- Executive Director: Michael Keating
- Budget: €8 million (2019)
- Website: www.eip.org

The European Institute of Peace (EIP) is an independent, non-profit public foundation that contributes to shaping conflict resolution. It is a philanthropic, non-profit organisation. It provides support to negotiators, mediators and policy makers within Europe. Since its creation in 2014, the Institute has operated in more than ten countries in the Middle East, Central Asia, Africa, Latin America and Europe providing policy advice on conflict resolution.

The institute's Board of Governors provides strategic, political and technical support to the Institute. The Board comprises eight members (Belgium, Finland, Ireland, Italy, Luxembourg, Poland, Spain and Sweden) and may be expanded to a maximum of fifteen. Helga-Maria Schmid is the President of the Board of Governors.

It receives donations from several countries through membership fees and project funding from national governments and the European Commission. In 2019, the Institute had a total operating income of approximately €8 million and corresponding expenditure.

== History ==
In 2009, former Finnish president and Nobel Peace Prize winner Martti Ahtisaari called for the establishment of a European Institute of Peace, underpinning the need for improved learning from past lessons. In 2010 Sweden's Minister for Foreign Affairs Carl Bildt and Finnish Minister for Foreign Affairs Alexander Stubb developed a joint non-paper that was addressed to the High Representative of the Union for Foreign Affairs and Security Policy Catherine Ashton. They referred to the limits of traditional diplomacy and emphasised the added value that capacities beyond those available to high-level decision-makers could have. At the same time, the idea of a European Institute of Peace gained increasing attention among members of the European Parliament (MEPs) and was particularly supported by German MEP Franziska Brantner and French MEP Alain Lamassoure.

Subsequently, the European Parliament commissioned three major studies on the establishment of a European Institute of Peace, including a study on a blueprint for the Institute, a cost-benefit analysis and a study on the added value and financial appraisal. The process for the establishment of the Institute was steered by a Core Group of States, which explored the best alternatives to make it fit with European efforts and realities.

Numerous workshops and seminars were held to discuss European mediation and the future role of the Institute. These events included a workshop in the European Parliament's Committee on Foreign Affairs, three workshops organised by the Irish EU Council Presidency and the European Parliament in Paris, Berlin and Sofia in 2013, and a high-level conference in Brussels in May 2013, jointly organised by the Parliament, the Irish EU Council Presidency and the EEAS.

After four years of consultations with European governments, international conflict resolution organisations, the European Union bodies, and experts on peace and security, the Institute’s statutes were signed on 18 February 2014. On 5 May 2014, the Board was constituted and the President elected. On 12 May 2014, the Institute was launched by foreign ministers of the founding member states (Belgium, Finland, Hungary, Italy, Luxembourg, Poland, Spain, Sweden and Switzerland).

Staffan de Mistura was appointed as the first President of the Board and served until October 2016. Pekka Haavisto replaced de Mistura in October 2016 and continued to serve until he was nominated as Minister for Foreign Affairs in June 2019. The former Swedish State Secretary for Foreign Affairs Annika Söder was subsequently appointed as the Institute’s third President of the Board in July 2019.

Martin Griffiths served as the Institute’s first Executive Director between 2014 and March 2018 before being nominated as the United Nations Special Envoy for Yemen. Griffiths was replaced on an interim basis by Stine Lehmann-Larsen, who assumed responsibility as acting Executive Director. In November 2018, Michael Keating was appointed as Executive Director of the Institute. Previously, he was the United Nations Special Representative of the Secretary-General (SRSG) and Head of the United Nations Assistance Mission in Somalia from 2016 to September 2018.
