= Office of the Special Envoy of the Secretary-General for Yemen =

The Office of the Special Envoy of the Secretary-General for Yemen is a Special Envoy of the Secretary-General first appointed in 2012 to assist the Secretary-General for Yemen.

== List of envoys ==
Jamal Benomar: The first Special Envoy to Yemen was Jamal Benomar who began representing the Secretary General in Yemen during the summer of 2011 but was only formally appointed as a Special Envoy on 1 August 2012. Benomar is from Morocco. Benomar was credited with helping Yemen avert civil war in 2011 and for helping organise the National Dialogue Conference. By the end of 2014 and the start of 2015, a full blown conflict had started in Yemen, which Benomar tried to mediate. Benomar resigned in April 2015 after failing to prevent the conflict.

Ismail Ould Cheikh Ahmed: On 25 April 2015, Ismail Ould Cheikh Ahmed was appointed Special Envoy to Yemen. Ahmed is from Mauritania. Ahmed studied economics at Maastricht University and Montpellier University and also studied human resources at Manchester University. Between 2008 and 2012, Ahmed was a UN resident humanitarian and development co-ordinator in Syria. From 2012 to 2014, he occupied the same position in Yemen. In June 2017, the Houthis accused Mr. Ahmed of having abandoned his neutrality and warned him never to come to Yemen again. Ahmed left his post on 22 January 2018. In June 2018, he was appointed Minister of Foreign Affairs in Mauritania.

Martin Griffiths: On 16 February 2018, Martin Griffiths was appointed Special Envoy to Yemen. Griffiths is British and is a career diplomat. Griffiths previously served as the first executive director of the European Institute of Peace from 2016 to September 2018. In 1999, he helped launch the Centre for Humanitarian Dialogue in Geneva. On 12 May 2021, United Nations Secretary-General António Guterres announced that he had appointed Griffiths as Under-Secretary-General for Humanitarian Affairs and Emergency Relief Coordinator, Office for the Coordination of Humanitarian Affairs (OCHA).

Hans Grundberg: On 6 August 2021, Hans Grundberg was appointment by António Guterres as his Special Envoy for Yemen. Grundberg who is from Sweden has served as ambassador of the European Union to Yemen since 2019.
