= January 2020 Marib attack =

- Part of Marib Campaign
- Type: Drone and missile attack
- Location: Marib, Yemen; 15°25′N 45°21′E
- Target: Military camp
- Date: 18 January 2020
- Executed by: Houthis (denied by Houthis)
- Casualties: 111 soldiers killed 5 civilians killed 148 injured
- Location within Yemen

On 18 January 2020, a drone and missile attack on a mosque in a military camp near Marib killed at least 111 Yemeni soldiers during evening prayers. Dozens more were injured. No group claimed responsibility, although the Houthi movement is suspected and was accused of carrying out the attack.

== Attack ==
The attack was carried out using ballistic missiles and drones. The target was a mosque located on the grounds of a military training camp. It was attacked during evening prayers when dozens of people were inside praying.

The strike had been preceded by months of relative calm in the lingering Yemeni Civil War, where death tolls are often disputed, but the huge toll in Marib represented one of the bloodiest single attacks since the war erupted in 2014.

== See also ==
- August 2020 Ma'rib attack
