= Jamal Benomar =

Former Special Adviser on Yemen to the United Nations (born 1957)

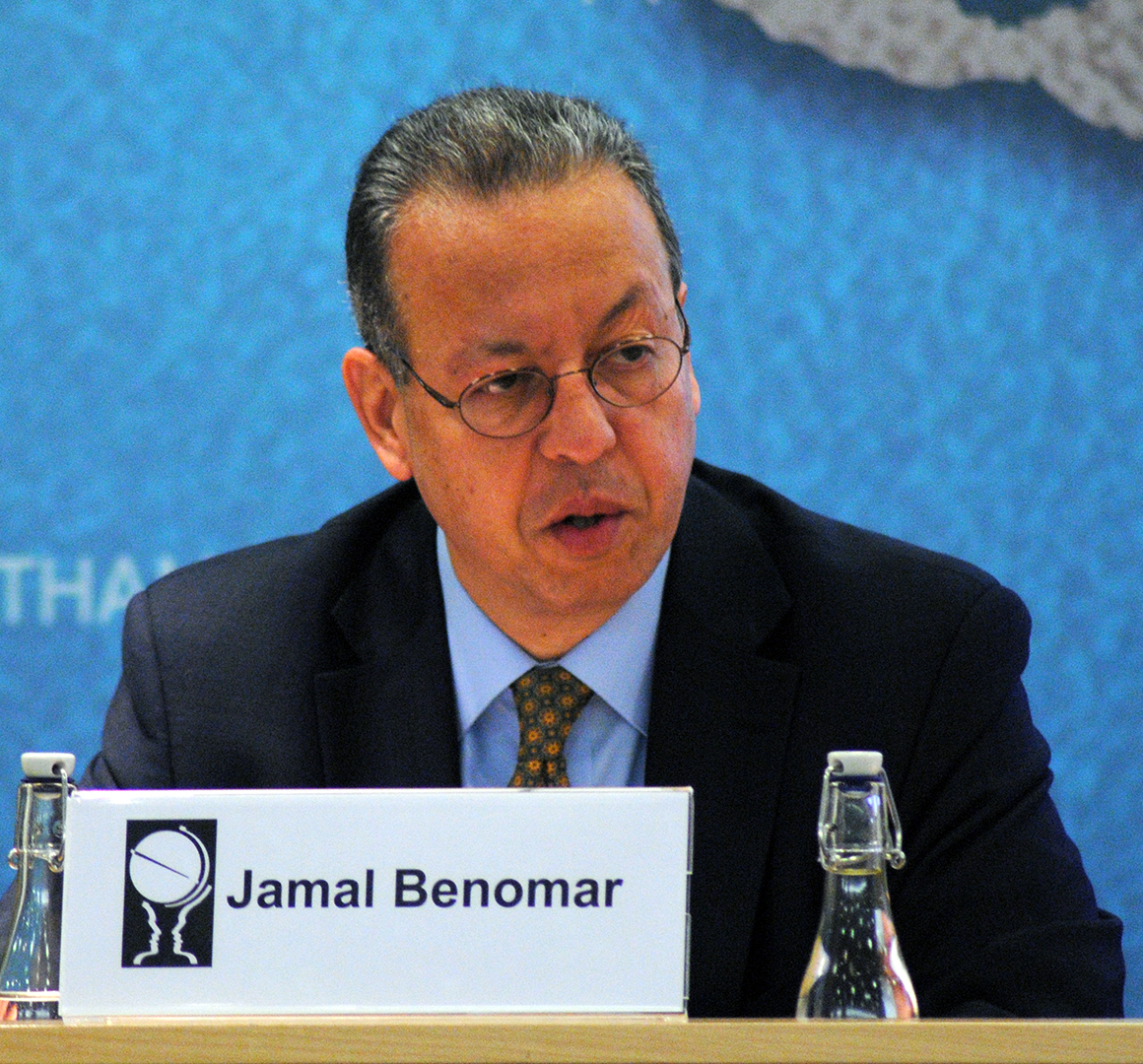
- Benomar at Chatham House in 2013

United Nations Special Envoy for Yemen
- In office April 2011 – 25 April 2015
- Appointed by: Ban Ki-moon
- Preceded by: Position established
- Succeeded by: Ismail Ould Cheikh Ahmed

Personal details
- Born: 1957 (age 68–69) Nador, Morocco
- Occupation: United Nations Under Secretary-General

Jamal Benomar (Arabic: جمال بنعمر; born c. April 1957) is a former UN diplomat. He worked at the UN for 25 years, including as a Special Envoy for Yemen and a special adviser to former Secretary-General Ban Ki-moon. He is currently chair of the International Center for Dialogue Initiatives.

== Early life and education ==
Benomar was born in April 1957 in Nador, north of Morocco. At 19, as a political activist known for his peaceful opposition to the government, he was arrested and imprisoned for eight years.

"I just 'disappeared'," he told the New Internationalist in 1986. "That night I was tortured from midnight to 5 o'clock in the morning. They used the classical methods: binding the hands and feet of my naked body to an iron bar and whipping the soles of my feet while forcing my head back in a bucket of excrement."

He and other political prisoners went on a hunger strike to demand their right to a fair trial. The trial finally took place. It lasted seven weeks, and at the end, Benomar and his fellow 130 defendants were all found guilty and handed heavy sentences.

By this time, Amnesty International had been made aware of the cases, and each of the 130 prisoners was adopted by a regional group. Benomar's group in Sweden wrote to him for two years before he finally received one of their letters. When he and other prisoners went on a 45-day hunger strike, Amnesty sent telegrams and issued appeals on their behalf. "It was a great moral support to know that there were people in the other end of the world who were organising all these activities for my release, people who didn't know me but were concerned about human rights," Benomar said. "It gave me quite a lot of courage."

After his release, Benomar fled the country and received asylum in Britain, where he completed his doctorate at the University of London.

== Career ==
=== United Nations ===
In his career at the UN, Benomar worked for the Office of the High Commissioner for Human Rights (OHCHR), the United Nations Development Programme (UNDP) and the Department of Political Affairs (DPA).

His work at the UN largely focused on peacebuilding and governance issues in conflict countries. In 2005 he helped to establish the United Nations Peacebuilding Commission and Peacebuilding Support Office, which he also directed. He has advised on conflict resolution issues in over 30 countries, including Yemen, Afghanistan and Iraq, where in 2004 he served as the Secretary-General's Envoy to support the National Dialogue Conference.

He has been described as "quintessentially political" by the head of the Centre for Humanitarian Dialogue, David Harland, who has worked closely with Benomar. "He is not a simple man who is willing to put all of his cards on the table," Harland told the Atlantic Council in 2014.

On 9 November 2015, Benomar was appointed as the UN Secretary-General's Special Adviser for Conflict Prevention. In that role he led the UN response to the political crisis in Burundi.

==== Special Envoy for Yemen ====
In Yemen, Benomar served for four years as the UN Secretary-General's Special Envoy. Benomar led the Office of the Special Envoy of the Secretary-General for Yemen, where he worked "to facilitate the combined efforts of the international community to promote a democratic transition in the country". Benomar brokered the country's Transition Agreement in November 2011, facilitated the successful conclusion of the National Dialogue Conference in January 2014, which took 10 months of deliberations, and mediated the Peace and National Partnership Agreement in September 2014. Benomar facilitated a new round of negotiations, in February and March. During that time Benomar became one of the only foreign diplomats ever to meet Abdulmalik al-Houthi in person.

The talks were close to a conclusion, when on March 25, 2015, the Saudis intervened militarily. Less than a month later, Benomar resigned. In a statement delivered to the press following his final briefing on Yemen to the Security Council, Benomar condemned "systematic acts of obstruction" and warned against "interference and coercion from outside forces". "I stressed [to the Security Council] that getting the political process back on track and achieving lasting peace and stability in Yemen could only be reached through Yemeni-led peaceful negotiations, where Yemenis could determine their future," he said.

Benomar warned that Yemen's conflict could become an “Iraq-Libya-Syria” scenario if either side pushes for control of the country, prompting the U.N. Security Council to threaten further measures if the hostilities do not end. “It would be an illusion to think that the Houthis could mount an offensive and succeed in taking control of the entire country. It would be equally false to think that President Hadi could assemble sufficient forces to liberate the country from the Houthis. Any side that would want to push the country in either direction would be inviting a protracted conflict in the vein of an Iraq-Libya-Syria combined scenario,” he said. The statement sparked outrage among the Saudis and their Gulf allies, who poured scorn on Benomar in the Arabic-speaking media.

=== Publications and Media Appearances ===
Benomar has authored numerous publications over the course of his career dealing with governance, rule of law, constitution writing, and peace building. These have ranged from editorial pieces which have appeared in The Guardian and Newsweek, to scholarly articles in academic journals such as the Journal of Democracy and Third World Quarterly. Benomar also writes for the International Center for Dialogue Initiatives's monthly publication Diplomacy Now.

Benomar has also appeared on TV news programs on several networks, including CNN, BBC, and Al Jazeera.

== Personal life ==
A British citizen, Benomar is married with four children, and lives in the U.S. state of New York.
