= August 2020 Marib attack =

- Part of Marib Campaign
- Type: Missile attack
- Location: Marib, Yemen; 15°25′N 45°21′E
- Target: Mosque at a military camp
- Date: 27 August 2020
- Executed by: Houthis
- Casualties: 5-17 soldiers killed 35-40 soldiers injured
- Location within Yemen

On 28 August 2020, Houthi forces launched a ballistic missile and drone attack at a military camp in Marib Governorate, targeting Saudi-led coalition forces supporting the government of Abdrabbuh Mansur Hadi. The attack killed at least 5 Yemeni soldiers, other sources indicate 40 killed. Soldiers were also reported injured.

== Attack ==
The target was a mosque located on the grounds of a military training camp, previously attacked in January 2020. Similar to the January attack, this attack also took place during evening prayers when dozens of people were inside praying, according to military sources close to Hadi government forces.

== See also ==
- January 2020 Ma'rib attack
