= Ismail Ould Cheikh Ahmed =

United Nations official (born 1960)

- Ismaïl Ould Cheikh Ahmed (2026)

13th Secretary General of the Organisation of Islamic Cooperation
- Incumbent
- Assumed office 27 August 2026
- Preceded by: Hissein Brahim Taha

Minister of Foreign Affairs of Mauritania
- In office 11 June 2018 – 31 March 2022
- Preceded by: Isselkou Ould Ahmed Izid Bih
- Succeeded by: Mohamed Salem Ould Merzoug

United Nations Special Envoy for Yemen
- In office 25 April 2015 – 26 February 2018
- Appointed by: Ban Ki-moon
- Preceded by: Jamal Benomar
- Succeeded by: Martin Griffiths

Personal details
- Born: 9 November 1960 (age 66) Nouakchott, Mauritania
- Education: University of Montpellier (BA); University of Manchester (MSc); Maastricht University

Ismail Ould Cheikh Ahmed (Arabic: اسماعيل ولد الشيخ أحمد; born 9 November 1960) is a Mauritanian diplomat and politician who is currently serving as 13th Secretary General of Organisation of Islamic Cooperation. He served as a United Nations Special Envoy for Yemen and was therefore head of the Office of the Special Envoy of the Secretary-General for Yemen from 25 April 2015 to 26 February 2018.

== Education ==
Ahmed earned Bachelor of Arts (BA) degree in Economics and Management from the University of Montpellier in 1984. Then he earned Master of Science (MSc) degree in Human Resource Development the University of Manchester in 1998. He also received Advanced Certificate in Economics and Social Policy Analysis from the Maastricht University in 2007.

== Career ==
Ahmed served as United Nations Special Representative for the United Nations Mission for Ebola Emergency Response (UNMEER).

Prior to that appointment of 11 December 2014, Ahmed was the Deputy Special Representative and Deputy Head of the United Nations Support Mission in Libya (UNSMIL).

He was the Chief of Cabinet to the President of the Islamic Republic of Mauritania from April 2022 till July 2023, and held the position of the Minister of Foreign Affairs of Mauritania from 11 June 2018 to 31 March 2022.

On, 27 August 2026, he was unanimously elected to the position of Secretary-General of the Organization of Islamic Cooperation, succeeding Hissein Brahim Taha, at the Extraordinary Session of the Council of Foreign Ministers held in Jeddah, and assumed his duties immediately after taking the oath before a large audience of foreign ministers of Member States.
