= Hans Grundberg =

Swedish diplomat (born 1977)

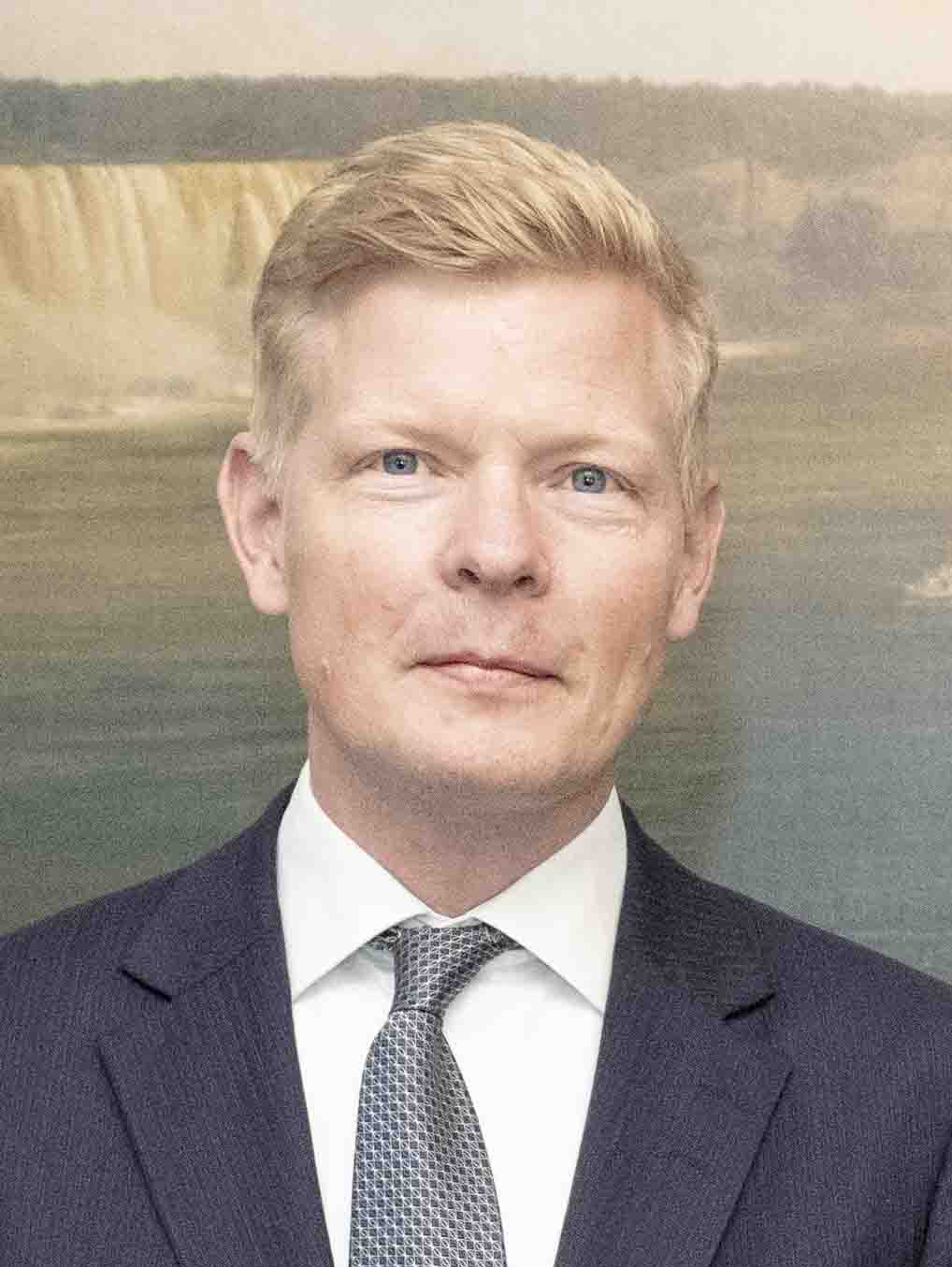
- Grundberg in Washington, D.C., on March 15, 2024

United Nations Special Envoy for Yemen
- Incumbent
- Assumed office 6 August 2021
- Preceded by: Martin Griffiths

Personal details
- Born: 1977 (age 48–49) Stockholm, Sweden
- Education: Stockholm School of Economics
- Occupation: Diplomat

Hans Grundberg (born 1977) is a Swedish diplomat and the current UN Special Envoy for Yemen since August 2021.

== Early life and education ==
Grundberg studied at the School of Economics in Stockholm and obtained a master's degree in economics.

== Diplomatic career ==
Grundberg served with both Swedish and European Union missions abroad, and posted to Cairo and Jerusalem, as well as Brussels, where he chaired the Middle East/Gulf Working Group of the European Council during the 2009 Swedish presidency of the European Union. In 2018 he headed the Gulf Division at the Swedish Ministry of Foreign Affairs in Stockholm during the time that Sweden hosted the United Nations-facilitated negotiations that culminated in the Stockholm Agreement. In 2019 Grundberg served as the EU's ambassador to Yemen before being appointed Special Envoy for Yemen in 2021.

In 2022, Grundberg helped broker the first ceasefire during the Yemeni Civil War since 2016. On 23 December 2023, he announced that the Houthis and the internationally backed government of Yemen had committed to steps towards a ceasefire.

Diplomatic posts
Preceded by Martin Griffiths	UN Special Envoy for Yemen; 2021	Succeeded by
