= Martin Griffiths =

British diplomat (born 1951)

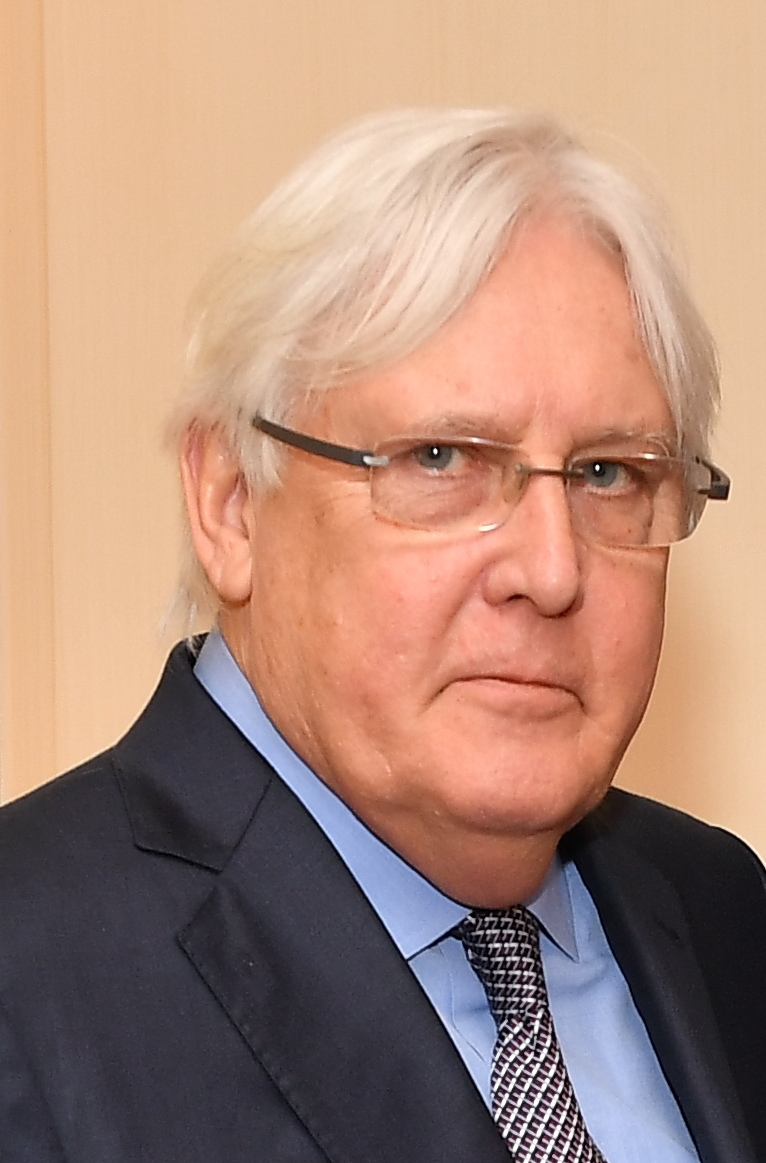
- Griffiths in 2018

United Nations Under-Secretary-General for Humanitarian Affairs and Emergency Relief Coordinator
- In office 19 July 2021 – 1 July 2024
- Appointed by: António Guterres
- Preceded by: Mark Lowcock
- Succeeded by: Thomas Fletcher

United Nations Special Envoy for Yemen
- In office 16 February 2018 – 19 July 2021
- Appointed by: António Guterres
- Preceded by: Ismail Ould Cheikh Ahmed
- Succeeded by: Hans Grundberg

Personal details
- Born: 3 July 1951 (age 75) Colombo, Sri Lanka
- Children: 2

Martin Griffiths (born 3 July 1951) is a British diplomat who served as Under-Secretary-General for Humanitarian Affairs and Emergency Relief Coordinator at the United Nations from 2021 to 2024.

== Early life and education ==
Born in Colombo, Sri Lanka, Griffiths was educated at Leighton Park School and the University of Sussex. He holds a Master's degree in Southeast Asian Studies from the School of Oriental and African Studies at the University of London and is a qualified barrister. He speaks French and English.

== Career ==
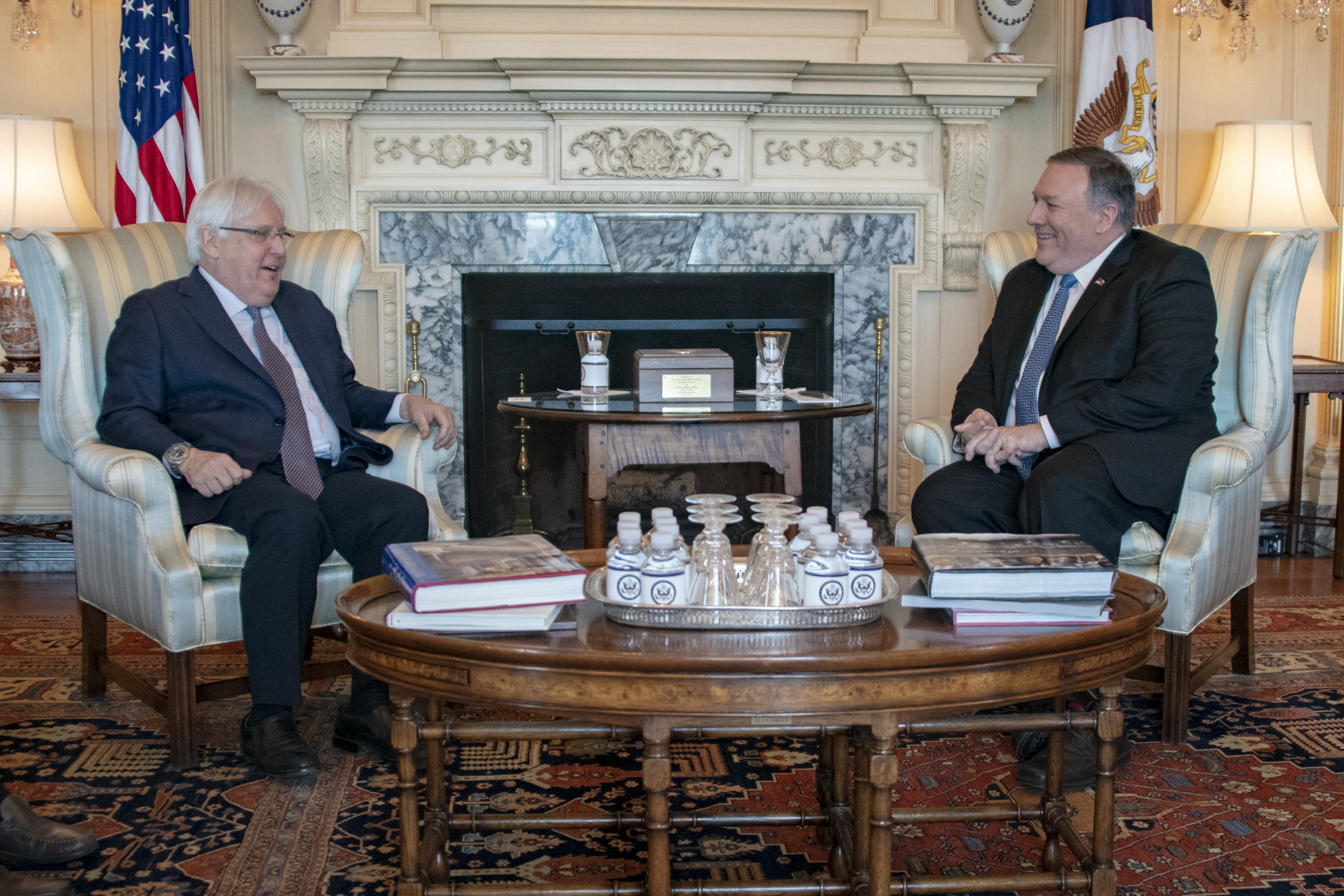
Griffiths meets with U.S. Secretary of State Michael R. Pompeo at the U.S. Department of State in Washington, D.C., on March 14, 2019.

Griffiths was a career diplomat at the UK's Foreign and Commonwealth Office and is an experienced conflict mediator. He previously served as the first executive director of the European Institute of Peace from 2016 to September 2018. In 1999, he helped launch the Centre for Humanitarian Dialogue in Geneva. He has also worked for Save The Children, Action Aid and UNICEF and has worked as an advisor to multiple United Nations Syria envoys.

From 2018 to 2021 he served as the United Nations Special Envoy for Yemen at the Office of the Special Envoy of the Secretary-General for Yemen. In February 2021 he visited Iran in an attempt to find a political solution to the Yemeni Civil War.

On 12 May 2021, the United Nations Secretary-General, António Guterres, announced that he had appointed Griffiths as Under-Secretary-General for Humanitarian Affairs and Emergency Relief Coordinator at the Office for the Coordination of Humanitarian Affairs, succeeding fellow Briton Mark Lowcock.

In February 2024, Griffiths expressed skepticism toward Israel's military aims in the Gaza war, questioning its ability to resolve its conflict with Hamas militarily. Griffiths said that, from the perspective of the UN aid office, “Hamas is not a terrorist group for us, as you know, it is a political movement" and that "it is very very difficult to dislodge these groups without a negotiated solution; which includes their aspirations. I cannot think of an example offhand of a place where a victory through warfare has succeeded against a well-entrenched group, terrorist or otherwise.”

In March 2024, Griffiths stated he was appalled by the Al-Rashid humanitarian aid incident, saying, "Life is draining out of Gaza at terrifying speed."

On 25 March 2024, Griffiths announced that he was leaving his post at the United Nations for health reasons. He retired on 1 July 2024 and was succeeded by fellow Briton Thomas Fletcher.

In November 2024, Griffiths was awarded an honorary degree by University of Galway for services to peace-keeping and diplomacy.

In March 2025, Griffiths was made an Honorary Research Associate of the Humanitarian Learning Centre at the Institute of Development Studies, University of Sussex.

In May 2025, Griffiths called the situation in Gaza a genocide, saying "I think now we've got to the point this is unequivocal."

Positions in intergovernmental organisations
Preceded by Mark Lowcock ( (United Kingdom) )	Under Secretary General for Humanitarian Affairs and Emergency Relief Coordinator; 2021–present	Succeeded by Thomas Fletcher
