= Saudi-led intervention in the Yemeni civil war =

- Part of the Yemeni civil war and the Iran–Saudi Arabia proxy war
Date	26 March 2015 – ongoing (11 years, 7 months and 4 weeks): Operation Decisive Storm 26 March – 21 April 2015 (3 weeks and 6 days); Operation Restoring Hope 22 April 2015 – 5 October 2026 (11 years, 5 months and 2 weeks); Operation Dawn of Yemen 5 October 2026 – present (1 month, 2 weeks and 3 days)
Location	Yemen
Status	Ongoing

Belligerents
Saudi Arabia; Coalition: United Arab Emirates; Bahrain; Kuwait; Qatar; Egypt; Jordan; Morocco (2015–19); Senegal (Note: soldiers not yet deployed in 2016); Sudan; Rapid Support Forces; South Korea (Note: soldiers not yet deployed in 2018 but did provide intel about Houthis); Bangladesh; Comoros; Djibouti; Maldives; Pakistan; Somalia; Turkey; Academi/Constellis; In support of: Republic of Yemen (PLC); Yemeni Armed Forces; Yemeni Air Force; Hirak; Popular Resistance Committee; Al-Islah Movement	SRC/SPC; Houthi militants; Yemeni Army (pro-Saleh and Houthis) (2015–17); YRG (2015–17)	Al-Qaeda (Note: Tactical alignment with the Saudi-led coalition against the Houthis; not a formal alliance.); AQAP

Commanders and leaders
(Saudi Arabia) Salman; (Saudi Arabia) Mohammed bin Salman; Joint Command: (Saudi Arabia) Abdulrahman bin Saleh al-Bunyan (2015–18); (Saudi Arabia) Fahd bin Turki Al Saud (2018–20); (Saudi Arabia) Mutlaq bin Salem bin Mutlaq Al-Azima (2020–24); (Saudi Arabia) Fahd bin Hamad Al-Salman (2024–26); (Saudi Arabia) Fayyadh Al Ruwaili (2026–); Coalition: (United Arab Emirates) Khalifa bin Zayed (United Arab Emirates) Mohamed bin Zayed (Kuwait) Sabah Al-Ahmad # (Kuwait) Nawaf Al-Ahmad # (Kuwait) Mishal Al-Ahmad (Bahrain) Hamad bin Isa (Qatar) Tamim bin Hamad (Egypt) Abdel Fattah el-Sisi (Sudan) Omar al-Bashir (2015–19) (Sudan) Abdel Fattah al-Burhan (Sudan) Hemedti (Jordan) Abdullah II (Morocco) Mohamed VI (2015–19) (Senegal) Macky Sall (2016–24) (Senegal) Bassirou Diomaye Faye (South Korea) Moon Jae-in (2018–22) (South Korea) Yoon Suk Yeol (2022–25) (South Korea) Lee Jae Myung (Bangladesh) Mirza Fakhrul Islam Alamgir (Comoros) Azali Assoumani (Djibouti) Ismaïl Omar Guelleh (Maldives) Mohamed Muizzu (Pakistan) Asif Ali Zardari (Somalia) Hassan Sheikh Mohamud (Turkey) Recep Tayyip Erdoğan; (Yemen) Rashad al-Alimi (2022–); (Yemen) Mohammed al-Maqdashi; (Yemen) Ali al-Ahmar; Former Leaders: (Yemen) Abdrabbuh Mansour Hadi (2015–22) (Yemen) Abd Rabbo Hussein † (Yemen) Ahmad Al-Yafei †	Mohammed al-Houthi; Mohamed al-Atifi (2016–); Mahdi al-Mashat (2018–); Saleh Ali al-Sammad † (2015–18); Hussein Khairan (2015–16); Abdul-Malik al-Houthi	Khalid Batarfi; Sa'ad bin Atef al-Awlaki; Ibrahim al Qosi

Strength
(Saudi Arabia) 100 warplanes and 150,000 troops (2015); 2,500 troops (2024) Coalition: (United Arab Emirates) 30 warplanes and 15,000 troops (Sudan) 4 warplanes and over 40,000 troops (Bahrain) 15 warplanes 300 troops (Kuwait) 15 warplanes (Qatar) 10 warplanes, 1,000 troops (Egypt) 4 warships and warplanes (Jordan) 6 warplanes (Morocco) 6 warplanes, 1,500 troops (Senegal) 2,100 troops (soldiers not yet deployed in 2016) (South Korea) 150 troops (soldiers not yet deployed in 2018 but did provide intel about Houthis) 1,800 security contractors	150,000–200,000 fighters; 200,000–250,000; YRG: 100,000; Popular Committees: 100,000	AQAP: 6,000–8,000 fighters

Casualties and losses
(Saudi Arabia) 1,000–3,000 soldiers killed by 2016; 10 captured; (United Arab Emirates) 108 soldiers killed; (Sudan) 1,000–4,000 soldiers killed; (Bahrain) 15 soldiers killed; 1 F-16 crashed; (Qatar) 4 soldiers killed; (Morocco) 10 soldiers killed; 1 F-16 shot down; (Jordan) 1 F-16 lost; 71 mercenaries killed; (Yemen) Unknown	Thousands killed (Al Jazeera; as of May 2018); 11,000+ killed (Arab Coalition claim; as of Dec. 2017)	Al-Qaeda / AQAP: 1,000 killed, 1,500 captured
- 12,907 Yemeni civilians killed (per the LCRD); 8,672 civilians killed, 9,741 injured by coalition's airstrikes (per Yemen Data Project); 500+ Saudi civilians killed (2014–2016); 377,000+ people killed overall (150,000+ from violence) (2014–2021) (UN)

On 26 March 2015, Saudi Arabia, leading a coalition of nine countries from West Asia and North Africa, staged a military intervention in Yemen at the request of Yemeni president Abdrabbuh Mansur Hadi, who had been ousted from the capital, Sanaa, in September 2014 by Houthis during the Yemeni civil war. Efforts by the United Nations (UN) to facilitate a power sharing arrangement under a new transitional government collapsed, leading to escalating conflict between government forces, Houthi rebels, and other armed groups, which culminated in Hadi fleeing to Saudi Arabia shortly before it began military operations in the country.

The first month of the intervention, codenamed Operation Decisive Storm (Arabic: عملية عاصفة الحزم, romanized: Amaliyyat 'Āṣifat al-Ḥazm), consisted of airstrikes on Houthi rebels and a full blockade. On 22 April, the Saudi-led coalition declared that it had achieved its initial goals and announced Operation Restoring Hope, which would comprise a "combination of political, diplomatic and military action" while continuing "to prevent the Houthi militias from moving or undertaking any operations inside Yemen". Ground forces were subsequently deployed into the country as part of a broader offensive against both Houthi militants and loyalists of Hadi's predecessor, Ali Abdullah Saleh. Owing to Iran's support of these factions, the conflict is widely regarded as part of the broader Saudi-Iran proxy conflict.

Egypt, Morocco, Jordan, Sudan, and the United Arab Emirates provided air and ground forces, while Kuwait, Qatar, Bahrain, and U.S. private military contractor Constellis headed several ground operations. Djibouti, Eritrea, and Somalia opened their airspace, territorial waters, and military bases to coalition forces. At varying stages, the intervention was backed by the United States, United Kingdom, France, Germany, and Canada. The U.S. provided intelligence and logistical support, such as aerial refueling and search-and-rescue for downed coalition pilots, accelerated the sale of weapons to coalition states, and continued strikes against AQAP. American and British servicemen have provided advice and training related to Saudi-led airstrikes in Yemen.

The intervention has drawn criticism from international organizations and human rights groups, which stated that it contributed to civilian casualties, damage to infrastructure, and the humanitarian situation in Yemen. Academics also debate whether it violates Article 2(4) of the UN Charter. By 2019, the conflict was reported as a "military stalemate", and the following year, Saudi Arabia declared its first unilateral ceasefire. On 29 March 2022, the Saudi-led coalition announced that it would cease all hostilities within Yemen to facilitate political talks and peacekeeping efforts; Houthi and Saudi officials subsequently began bilateral peace talks mediated by Oman under UN auspices, and most restrictions on commercial goods were lifted by April 2023. In April 2024, open hostilities had largely ceased, though negotiations were ongoing due to complications caused by Houthi attacks on Red Sea shipping since October 2023. After Saudi Arabia resumed bombing Yemen amidst the 2026 Iran war, Ansar Allah launched an offensive and succeeded in capturing territory along Yemen's western coast, potentially giving the group control over the geostrategically important Bab-el-Mandeb strait.

== Background ==
Saudi-backed Abdrabbuh Mansur Hadi, running unopposed as the only candidate for president, won the 2012 Yemeni elections. Since August 2014, the Houthis (also known as Ansar Allah) a Zaidi Shia movement and militant group backed by Iran, organized mass protests against the Hadi government's decisions and the new constitution. The protests culminated into the Houthi takeover of the Yemeni government in 2015, after which the Houthis declared victory for the revolution and began drafting a new constitution, saying that Hadi's provisional government's term had already expired. Saudi Arabia and other countries denounced this as an unconstitutional coup d'état. The Houthis were supported by sections of the Yemeni armed forces loyal to the former president Ali Abdullah Saleh, who was removed from power as part of the 2011 Arab Spring uprisings but was later killed by his former Houthi allies.

By September 2014, Houthi fighters captured Sanaa, toppling Hadi's government. Soon after, a peace deal (known as the 'Peace and Partnership Agreement') was sealed between the Hadi government and the Houthis, but was not honored by either party. The deal was drafted with the intent of defining a power-sharing government. A conflict over a draft constitution resulted in the Houthis consolidating control over the Yemeni capital in January 2015. After resigning from his post alongside his prime minister and remaining under virtual house arrest for one month, Hadi fled to Aden in southern Yemen in February. Upon arriving in Aden, Hadi withdrew his resignation, saying that the actions of the Houthis from September 2014 had amounted to a "coup" against him. By 25 March, forces answering to Sanaa were rapidly closing in on Aden, which Hadi had declared to be Yemen's temporary capital.

During the Houthis' southern offensive, Saudi Arabia began a military buildup on its border with Yemen. In response, a Houthi commander boasted that his troops would counterattack against any Saudi aggression and would not stop until they had taken Riyadh, the Saudi capital.

On 25 March, Hadi called on the UN Security Council to authorise "willing countries that wish to help Yemen to provide immediate support for the legitimate authority by all means and measures to protect Yemen and deter the Houthi aggression".

Yemen's foreign minister, Riad Yassin, requested military assistance from the Arab League on 25 March, amid reports that Hadi had fled his provisional capital. On 26 March, Saudi state TV station Al-Ekhbariya TV reported that Hadi arrived at a Riyadh airbase and was met by Saudi defense minister Mohammed bin Salman. His route from Aden to Riyadh was not immediately known.

At a summit of the Arab League held in Sharm El-Sheikh, Egypt, on 28–29 March, President Hadi again repeated his calls for international intervention in the fighting. A number of League members pledged their support to Hadi's government during that meeting.

After more than seven years of hostilities that left thousands of civilians dead or injured and devastated Yemen, a surprise deal was agreed between regional rivals Saudi Arabia and Iran in March 2023. The deal aimed to restore diplomatic relations that could end the Saudi war in Yemen. Experts raised a warning that the war could worsen instead of ending, if Saudi Arabia agrees to end military operations.

== Operation Decisive Storm ==
According to the Saudi news outlet Al Arabiya, Saudi Arabia contributed 100 warplanes and 150,000 soldiers to the military operation. Several media agencies reported that planes from Egypt, Morocco, Jordan, Sudan, Kuwait, the United Arab Emirates, Qatar and Bahrain were taking part. Egypt had previously sent four warships supporting the Saudi naval blockade.

The operation was declared over on 21 April 2015.

=== Air campaign ===
==== March 2015 ====
In March 2015, in a joint statement, the member states of the Gulf Cooperation Council (with the exception of Oman) said they had decided to intervene against the Houthis at the request of Hadi's government.

The coalition declared Yemeni airspace to be a restricted area, with King Salman declaring the Royal Saudi Air Force to be in full control of the zone. Saudi Arabia began airstrikes, reportedly relying on US intelligence reports and surveillance images to select and hit targets, including weapons, aircraft on the ground and air defences. Al Jazeera reported that Mohammed Ali al-Houthi, a Houthi commander appointed in February as president of the Revolutionary Committee, was injured and three other Houthi commanders were killed by airstrikes in Sanaa.

Strikes on 26 March also hit Al Anad Air Base, a former US special operations forces facility in Lahij Governorate seized by Houthis earlier in the week. The targets reportedly included the Houthi-controlled missile base in Sanaa and its fuel depot. Strikes overnight also targeted Houthis in Taiz and Saada. Thousands demonstrated in Sanaa against the intervention, which ex-president Ali Abdullah Saleh also condemned. In Taiz thousands came out supporting Hadi and Saudi Arabia.

The scope of strikes expanded further on 27 March, with a radar installation in the Marib Governorate and an airbase in the Abyan Governorate coming under air attack. The commander of the operation dismissed reports of civilian casualties, saying airstrikes were being carried out with precision. Additional strikes early on the next day hit targets in Hodeidah, Saada and the Sanaa area, as well as Ali Abdullah Saleh's main base. Rumours indicated Saleh fled to Sanhan, on the outskirts of the Houthi-controlled capital. An Aden government official said Saudi strikes destroyed a long-range missile facility controlled by the Houthis.

The Houthis claimed to have shot down a Sudanese Air Force plane over northern Sanaa and captured its pilot on 28 March. The Sudanese government denied that any of its four warplanes had come under fire or been shot down. On the previous day, the Houthis claimed to have shot down a "hostile" Saudi drone in Sanaa.

Airstrikes hit an arms depot, military airbase and special forces headquarters in Sanaa early on 29 March. A weapons depot outside Sanaa was destroyed, causing damage to an airport and planes on the ground. Saada and Hodeidah were targeted as well. Brigadier General Ahmed Asiri, the coalition's spokesman, said Saudi artillery and Apache attack helicopters were mobilised to "deter" Houthi fighters massing on the border with Saudi Arabia.

On 30 March, at least 40 people including children were killed and 200 were injured by an airstrike that hit the Al-Mazraq refugee camp near a military installation in the northern district of Haradh, international organizations said. Airstrikes also hit areas near the presidential palace in Sanaa, as well as Aden International Airport.

Food storage of Yemen Economic Corporation in Hodeidah was destroyed by three coalition strikes on 31 March. Airstrikes were not limited to the Yemeni mainland. Missiles struck homes on the island of Perim, according to residents who fled by boat to Djibouti.

==== April 2015 ====
Destruction in Sanaa after airstrike on 20 April 2015

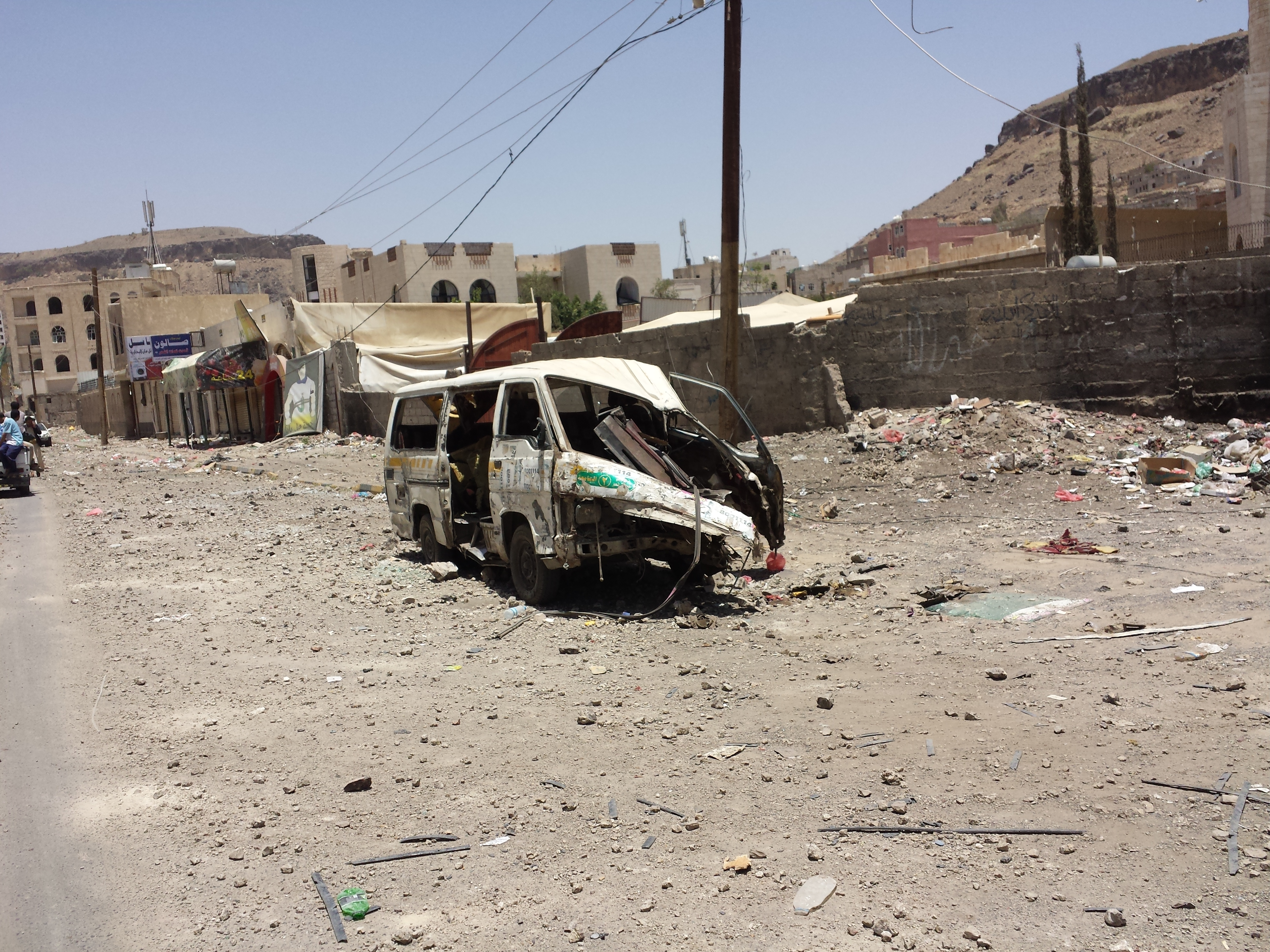
Destruction in the residential neighborhoods near Attan mountain

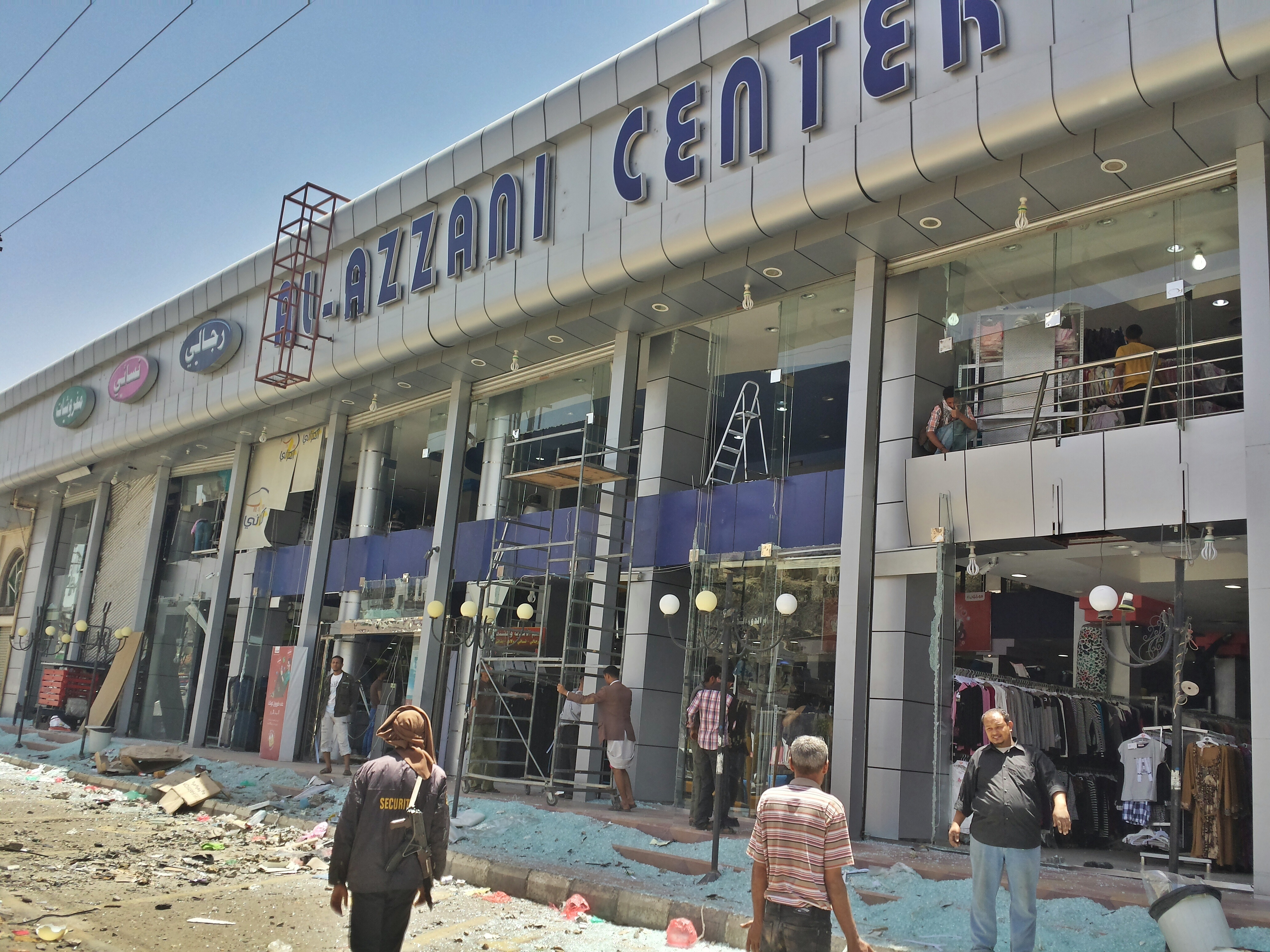
Destroyed shopping center

Dozens of casualties came from an explosion in a dairy and oil factory in Hodeidah, which was variously blamed on an airstrike or a rocket from a nearby military base on 1 April. Medical sources reported 25 deaths, while the Yemen Army said 37 were killed and 80 wounded. Airstrikes also hit targets in Saada on 1 April.

Despite persistent airstrikes, Houthi and allied units continued to advance on central Aden, backed by tanks and heavy artillery. Houthis seized the presidential palace on 2 April, but reportedly withdrew after overnight air raids early the next day. Coalition planes also airdropped weapons and medical aid to pro-Hadi fighters in Aden.

The International Committee of the Red Cross (ICRC) announced on 5 April that it had received permission from the coalition to fly medical supplies and aid workers into Sanaa and was awaiting permission to send a surgical team by boat to Aden. The coalition said it had set up a special body to coordinate aid deliveries to Yemen.

On 6 April, airstrikes began before sunset and struck targets in western Sanaa, Saada and the Ad Dali' Governorate, a supply route for Houthis in the Battle of Aden.

Airstrikes on 7 April hit a Republican Guard base in the Ibb Governorate, injuring 25 troops. Yemeni sources claimed three children at a nearby school were killed by the attack, while six were injured.

The Parliament of Pakistan voted against military action on 10 April, despite a request from Saudi Arabia that it join the coalition.

Airstrikes launched on 12 April, against the base of the 22nd Brigade of the Yemeni Republican Guard in the Taiz Governorate struck both the brigade and a nearby village inhabited by members of the Al-Akhdam minority community, killing eight civilians and injuring more than ten others. On 17 April, both the GCC coalition's spokesman called by Saudi broadcaster Al-Ehkbariya TV and a commander of the pro-Hadi rebels on the ground said airstrikes had intensified, focusing on both Sanaa and Taiz. One strike on the Republican Palace in Taiz killed 19 pro-Houthi gunmen.

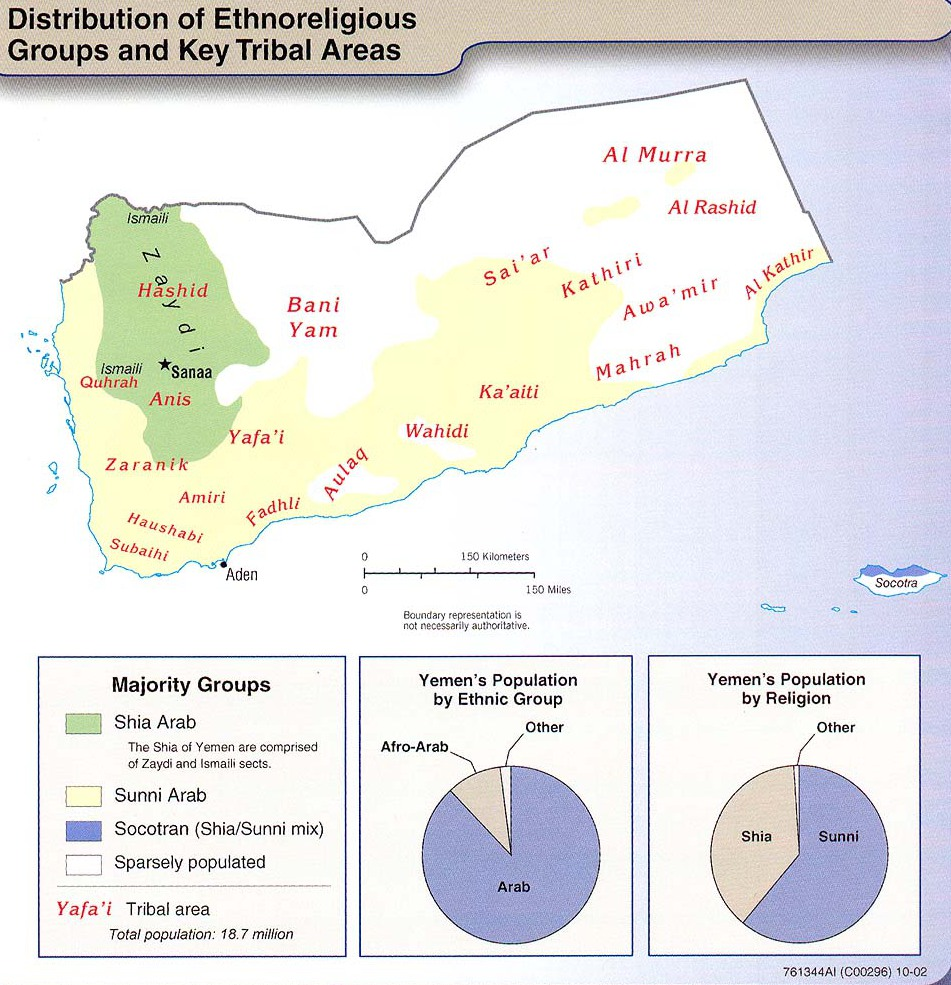
Ethnoreligious groups in 2002. Zaydi Shia followers make up between 35% and 42.1% of Muslims in Yemen.

=== Naval role ===
Egypt and Saudi Arabia committed warships to support coalition operations. Somalia offered its airspace and territorial waters. Four Egyptian Navy vessels steamed toward the Gulf of Aden after operations began. Riyadh requested access to Somali airspace and waters to carry out operations. On 27 March, the Egyptian military said a squadron of Egyptian and Saudi warships took up positions at the Bab al-Mandab strait. The Saudi military threatened to destroy any ship attempting to make port.

The Royal Saudi Navy evacuated diplomats and United Nations staff from Aden to Jeddah on 28 March.

Witnesses told Reuters that Egyptian warships bombarded Houthi positions as they attempted to advance on Aden on 30 March. Warships again fired on Houthi positions at Aden International Airport on or about 1 April.

Djibouti foreign minister Mahmoud Ali Youssouf said the Houthis placed heavy weapons and fast attack boats on Perim and a smaller island in the Bab al-Mandab strait. He warned "the prospect of a war in the strait of Bab al-Mandab is a real one" and said the weapons posed "a big danger" to his country, commercial shipping traffic, and military vessels. He called on the coalition to clear the islands, which he said included missiles and long-range cannons.

On 4 April, Egyptian President Abdel Fattah el-Sisi called protecting Red Sea shipping and securing the Bab al-Mandab "a top priority for Egypt's national security".

On 15 April, coalition spokesman Saudi Brigadier General Ahmed Al-Asiri, said that its warships were focusing on protecting shipping routes and screening ships heading to port for shipments intended for the Houthis.

The US Navy provided support to the naval blockade, halting and searching vessels suspected of carrying Iranian arms to the Houthis. On 21 April, the United States announced it was deploying warships to Yemeni waters to monitor Iranian ships. The US in particular noted a convoy of Iranian vessels, which US authorities said could potentially be carrying weapons to Houthi fighters in contravention of UN sanctions. The US reported that the Iranian convoy reversed course on 23 April.

=== Ground clashes ===
Sudan said it was stationing ground troops in Saudi Arabia. The Special Forces of the Bahrain Defence Force, Taskforce 11, were also deployed to Yemen.

Between 31 March and April, Saudi and Houthi forces reportedly traded artillery and rocket fire across the border between SA and Yemen. A Saudi border guard was killed on 2 April, the campaign's first confirmed coalition casualty. Followed by another two soldiers killed the next day. An Egyptian truck driver was killed by Houthi shelling.

SA reportedly began removing sections of the Saudi–Yemen barrier fence along its border with the Saada and Hajjah governorates on 3 April. The purpose of the removal was not immediately clear.

On 12 April, members of the Takhya tribe launched an attack on a Saudi base after several of its members died in an airstrike. Weapons and ammunition were taken.

On 19 April, as Houthi leader Abdul-Malek El-Houthi accused SA of planning to invade Yemen, Asiri claimed that coalition forces had information regarding a planned Houthi incursion into SA. A Saudi border guard died on 19 April and two others were injured from gunfire and mortar shelling across the border.

== Operation Restoring Hope ==
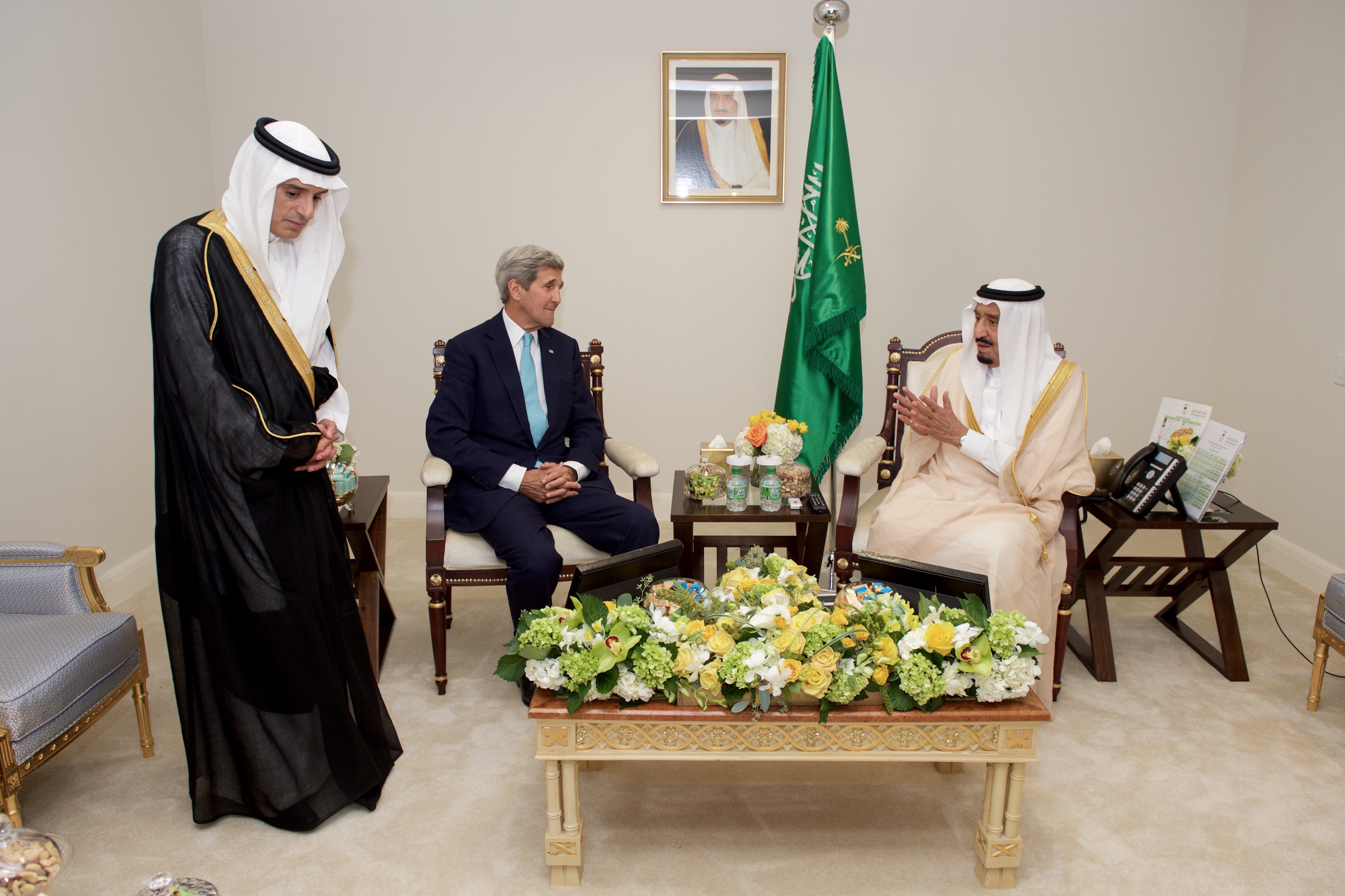
King Salman of Saudi Arabia and Saudi Foreign Minister Adel al-Jubeir meet with U.S. Secretary of State John Kerry in September 2015.

On 21 April 2015, the Saudi Defence Ministry declared it was ending the campaign of airstrikes because it had "successfully eliminated the threat" to its security posed by Houthi ballistic and heavy weaponry. It announced the start of a new phase codenamed Operation Restoring Hope. In a televised address, Hadi said the end of airstrikes had come at his request and thanked the Arab coalition for their support.

Earlier that day King Salman ordered the Saudi National Guard to join the military operation. Air and naval strikes continued despite the announcement that Decisive Storm had ended.

Both the Omani and Iranian governments said they welcomed the end of airstrikes. On 22 April, Oman presented a seven-point peace deal to both parties. The proposed peace treaty entailed the reinstatement of Hadi's government and the evacuation of Houthi fighters from major cities.

Outside intervention

On 8 May, Saudi Arabia announced a five-day ceasefire set to start on 12 May, following heavy pressure from the US. Later in the day, Saudi airplanes dropped leaflets in the Saada Governorate warning of airstrikes throughout the area. Houthi spokesman Mohamed al-Bukhaiti later told the BBC that the ceasefire had not been formally proposed and the Houthis would not respond until a plan was properly laid out. A spokesman for the Houthi-aligned military announced agreement to the ceasefire plan on 10 May, although he warned that a breach of the truce would prompt a military response.

On 13 May, humanitarian agencies said they were trying to get aid into Yemen after a five-day ceasefire took effect on Tuesday night. Ships carrying humanitarian supplies docked at the Houthi-controlled Red Sea port of Hodeidah as planes were standing by to help evacuate the injured. Meanwhile, King Salman doubled his country's Yemen aid pledge to $540 million, funds the UN said would "meet the life-saving and protection needs of 7.5 million people affected".

=== Airstrikes ===
At the operation's announcement, coalition leadership stressed that their campaign would attempt a political solution and that they would continue the air and naval blockade. Airstrikes resumed almost immediately following the coalition's announcement of the end of Operation Decisive Storm.

On 22 April airstrikes continued in Taiz, where an army base was hit shortly after Houthi fighters took it over, and Aden, where an airstrike targeted Houthi tanks moving into a contested district, among other locations, such as Hodeidah and Ibb. The Houthis continued to fight for territory, with a Houthi spokesman saying the group would be prepared for peace talks on the condition of "a complete halt of attacks". The previous round of UN-sponsored talks collapsed after Houthi rebels attacked Hadi's residence in Sanaa.

By 26 April, coalition forces were striking what they described as Houthi military targets in Sanaa and Aden and in other locations, notably in Sa'ada province near the Saudi border, nearly every night. On 26 April, after midnight, airstrikes struck Houthi and pro-Saleh positions and targets in and around Sanaa, Aden, and the Marib and Ad Dali' governorates, backing up anti-Houthi fighters in the latter three locations, with more than 90 rebels reportedly killed. Coalition warships shelled fighters near Aden's commercial port. Saudi warplanes also targeted Houthis in the Saada Governorate, while Saudi artillery fired on targets in the Hajjah Governorate along the border. The Saudi National Guard was deployed on the border.

On 28 April, Sanaa International Airport was bombed by Saudi F-15 fighters to prevent an Iranian plane belonging to the Iranian Red Crescent Society (IRCS) from landing, while it was approaching to land. The fighters had warned the plane to turn back, in an unsuccessful attempt to thwart its landing, but the Iranian pilot ignored the "illegal warnings", saying that, on the basis of international law, his plane did not need further permission to land.

On the night of 6 May 2015, the Saudi-led coalition carried out 130 airstrikes in Yemen in a 24-hour period. At first, coalition spokesperson Ahmed Asiri admitted that schools and hospitals were targeted but claimed that these were used as weapon storage sites. Asiri later claimed that his words had been mistranslated. The United Nations humanitarian coordinator for Yemen Johannes Van Der Klaauw said that these bombings constituted a war crime. "The indiscriminate bombing of populated areas, with or without prior warning, is a contravention international humanitarian law," he said. He continued to say that he was particularly concerned about airstrikes on Saada "where scores of civilians were reportedly killed and thousands were forced to flee their homes after the coalition declared the entire governate a military target".

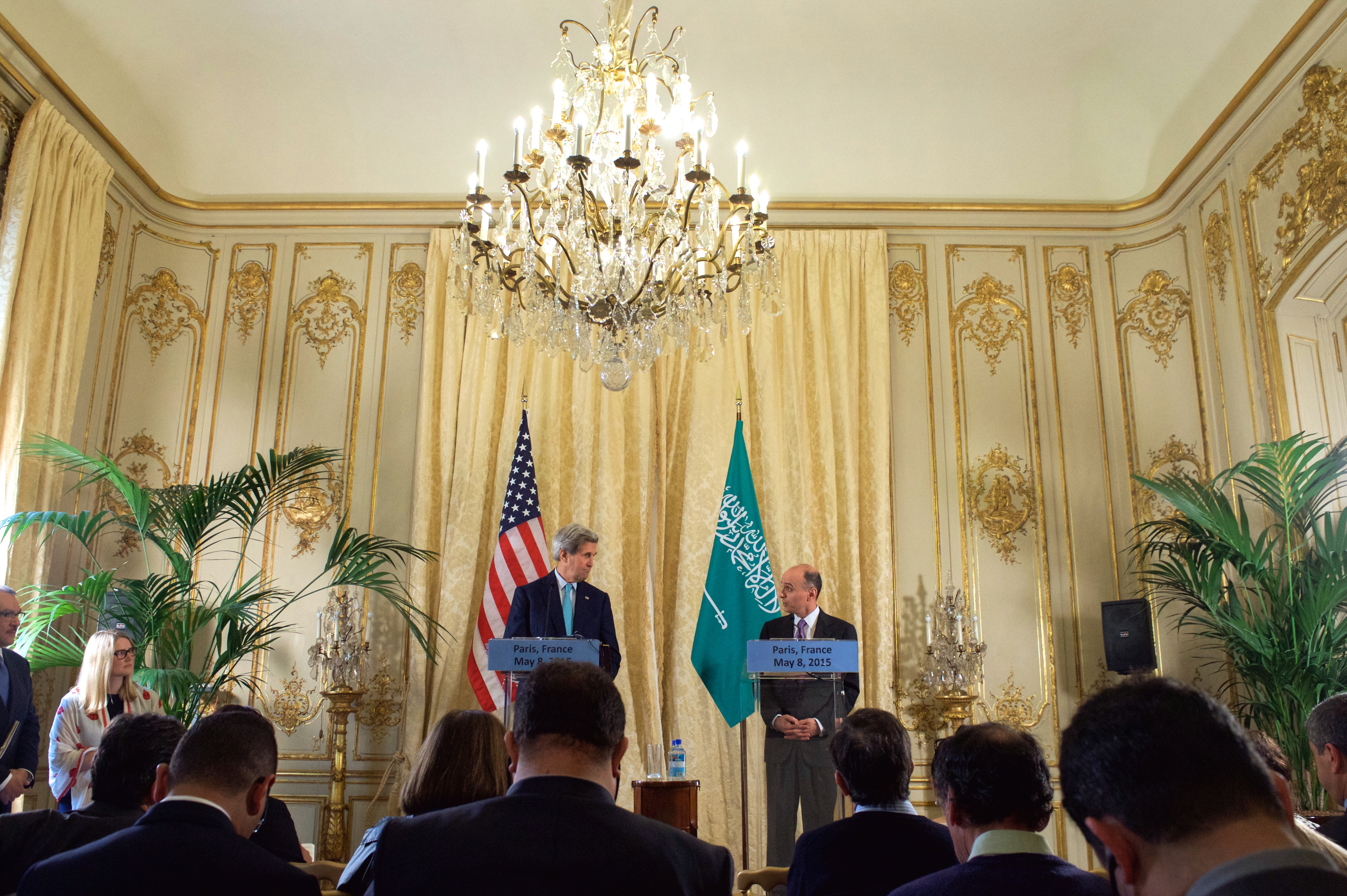
Saudi foreign minister Adel al-Jubeir announced a five-day ceasefire in Yemen, 8 May 2015.

The Iranian Foreign Ministry summoned the Saudi chargé d'affaires, and the Iranian Parliament and the Iranian Red Crescent Society blasted Saudi Arabia for blocking Iranian humanitarian aid.

The UN Office for the Coordination of Humanitarian Affairs (OCHA) "strongly urged" the coalition to stop targeting airports and seaports so that aid could reach all Yemenis.

ICRC and Médecins Sans Frontières (MSF), also known as Doctors Without Borders, said that they were extremely concerned about damage to the airports at Sanaa and to the port city of Hodeidah.

Overnight on 29 and 30 April, Saudi Arabia was reported to have airdropped arms to anti-Houthi fighters in Taiz.

On 30 April, airstrikes hit five provinces. New airstrikes hit SIA, completely halting aid deliveries.

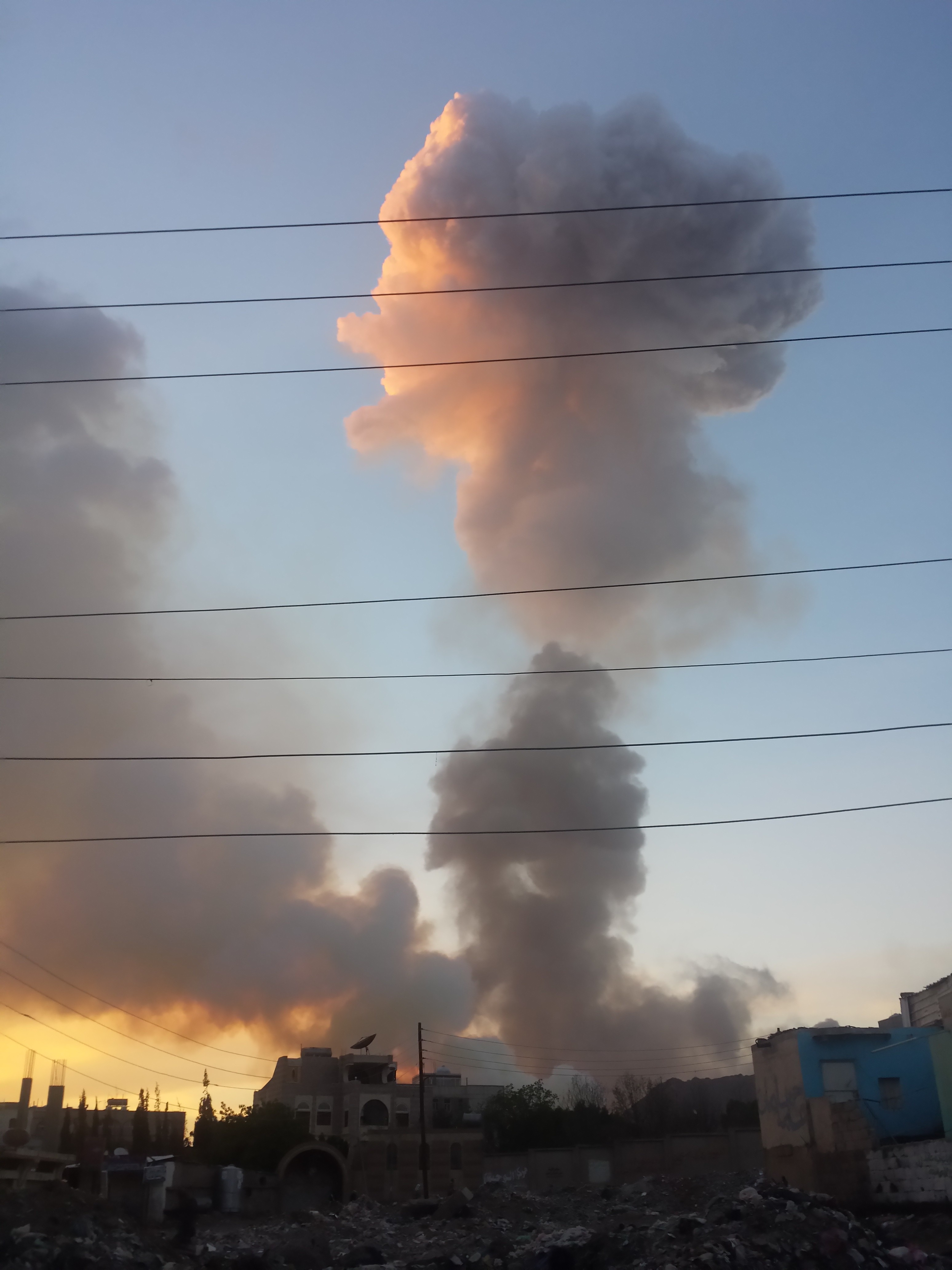
An airstrike in Sanaa, 11 May 2015

On 6 May, coalition airstrikes targeted the Police Training Center in the Dhamar Governorate, damaging nearby houses meanwhile the civil aviation authority announced it would re-open the airport to receive aid.

Coalition airstrikes targeted the houses of Saleh in Sanaa in the early hours of 10 May, eyewitnesses said. Khabar, a Yemeni news agency allied with Saleh said that the former president and his family were unharmed.

The Moroccan government said on 10 May that one of its General Dynamics F-16 Fighting Falcon aircraft taking part in the air campaign went missing in action over Yemen, along with its pilot. The Houthis claimed responsibility, with Yemeni state TV broadcasting a report on the jet being downed by tribal militias over the Saada Governorate and showing images of the wreckage.

On 18 May, Saudi-led airstrikes reportedly resumed on Houthi positions after a humanitarian ceasefire expired late the previous day; three coalition airstrikes hit Saada. Yemen's exiled Foreign Minister Riyadh Yassin blamed the rebel group for the renewal of hostilities. Al-Arabiya said Saudi forces shelled Houthi outposts along Yemen's northern border after the fighters fired mortars at a Saudi army post in Najran province.

On 23 May, OCHA reported that airstrikes continued in the northern governorates of Sa'ada (Baqim, Haydan, Saqayn and As Safra) and Hajjah (Abs, Hayran, Haradh, Huth, Kuhlan Affar and Sahar districts). The road connecting Haradh and Huth districts was reportedly hit. Airstrikes were also reported in Al Jawf Governorate (Bart Al Anan district).

On 27 May, airstrikes hit a police station in the capital, Sanaa, killing 45 officers. The Houthi-controlled Ministry of Health announced that in total, 96 people were killed.

On 3 June, the residence of a Houthi leader in Ibb province was hit by an airstrike, according to eyewitnesses.

Destruction in the south of Sanaa (12 June 2015)

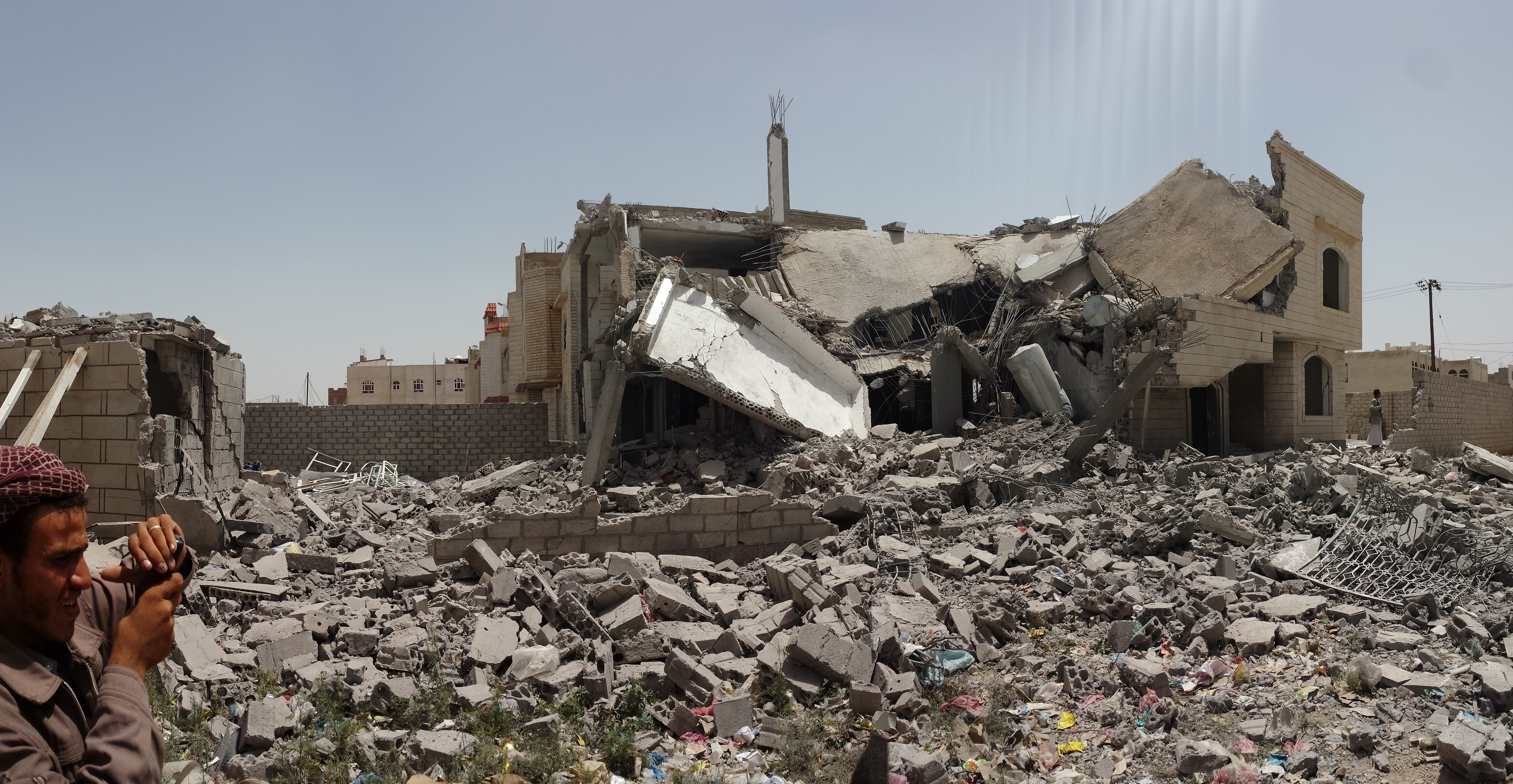
Destroyed house

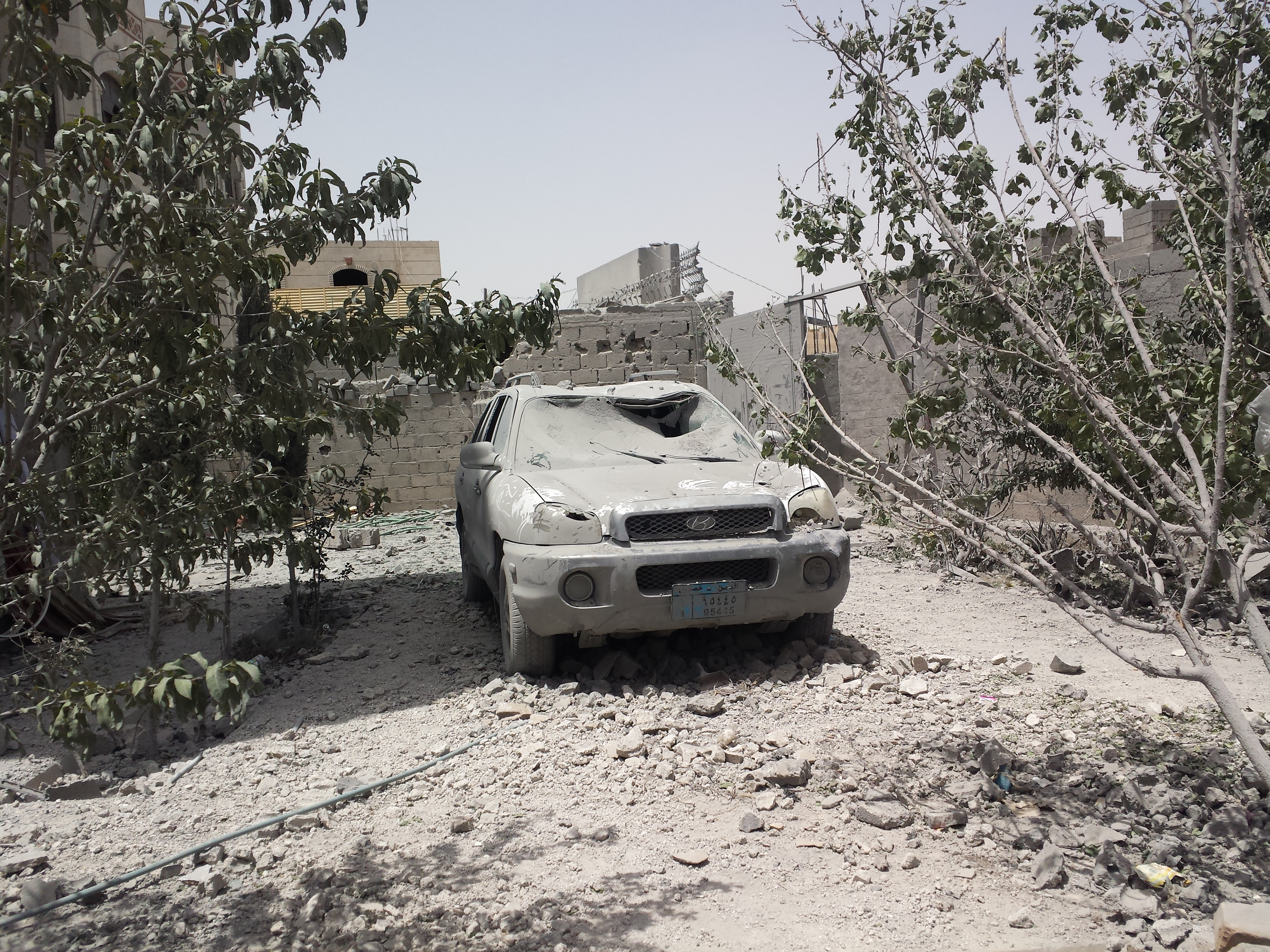
Destroyed car

On 12 June, Saudi jets bombed the UNESCO World Heritage Site of Sanaa Old City, killing at least six people and destroying some of the ancient buildings. UNESCO Director General Irina Bokova said in a statement that she is "profoundly distressed by the loss of human lives as well as by damage inflicted on one of the world's oldest jewels of Islamic urban landscape". Locals also condemned the action.

On 23 September 2015, the Saudi-led coalition destroyed a ceramics factory in the town of Matnah. One civilian was killed and others were wounded. According to the BBC, the bomb is believed to have been produced in the United Kingdom by GEC-Marconi Dynamics. The factory's owner Ghalib al-Sawary told the BBC: "We built it over 20 years but to destroy it took only twenty minutes." Campaigners say this attack was a violation of the laws of war.

On 26 October 2015 Médecins Sans Frontières reported that a coalition airstrike had completely destroyed a hospital they ran in Saada province's Haydan governorate, including the operating room. When the first strike hit an unused part of the hospital the facility was completely evacuated, so there were no direct casualties. A spokesman for the coalition forces, Brig-Gen Ahmed al-Asiri, denied responsibility for the attack. "With the hospital destroyed, at least 200,000 people now have no access to lifesaving medical care," MSF said. "This attack is another illustration of a complete disregard for civilians in Yemen, where bombings have become a daily routine," said Hassan Boucenine, MSF head of mission in Yemen. The GPS coordinates of the only hospital in the Haydan district were regularly shared with the Saudi-led coalition, and the roof of the facility was clearly identified with the MSF logo, he said. UNICEF said the hospital in Saada was the 39th health center hit in Yemen since March, when the violence escalated. "More children in Yemen may well die from a lack of medicines and healthcare than from bullets and bombs," its executive director Anthony Lake said in a statement. He added that critical shortages of fuel, medication, electricity and water could mean many more will close. Amnesty International said the strike may amount to a war crime and called for an independent investigation.

In February 2016, the Saudis bombed the ancient citadel of Kawkaban, killing seven civilians.

On 8 October 2016, Saudi-led airstrikes targeted a hall in Sanaa where a funeral was taking place. At least 140 people were killed and about 600 were wounded. According to The Independent, one rescuer said: "The place has been turned into a lake of blood." After initially denying it was behind the attack, the Coalition's Joint Incidents Assessment Team admitted that it had bombed the hall but claimed that this attack had been a mistake caused by bad information. After this attack, US national security spokesperson said that the US government was "deeply disturbed" by the bombing and added that US support for the Saudi-led coalition was "not a blank cheque". He added "we have initiated an immediate review of our already significantly reduced support to the Saudi-led Coalition." The United Nations humanitarian co-ordinator in Yemen Jamie McGoldrick said he was "shocked and outraged" by the "horrific" bombing. "This violence against civilians in Yemen must stop," he said.

On the night of 15 February 2017, the Saudi-led coalition bombed a funeral reception near Sanaa. Initial reports suggest the bombing killed nine women and one child with ten more women reported wounded. "People heard the sound of planes and started running from the house but then the bombs hit the house directly. The roof collapsed and there was blood everywhere," a resident of the village told a Reuters news agency cameraman.

An explosion in a warehouse on Sunday 7 April 2019, in Sanaa, have killed at least 11 civilians, including school children and left more than 39 people wounded. The Associated Press news agency said 13 killed, including 7 children and more than 100 were wounded. According to Al Jazeera and Houthi officials, the civilians were killed in a Saudi-led coalition airstrike. The Saudi-led coalition denied any airstrikes took place that day on Sanaa. The state-run news agency in Aden, aligned with the internationally recognized government, said the rebels had stored weapons at the warehouse. According to The Washington Post, "some families and residents of the district of Sawan said the explosion occurred after a fire erupted inside the warehouse. They said a fire sent columns of white smoke rising into the air, followed by the explosion." Their accounts were confirmed by several videos filmed by bystanders.

=== Ground combat ===
On 3 April 2015, CNN cited an unnamed Saudi source who claimed that Saudi special forces were on the ground in and around Aden, "coordinating and guiding" the resistance. The Saudi government officially declined to comment on whether it had special forces, with Saudi Ambassador to the United States Adel al-Jubeir saying on 2 April that Saudi Arabia had no "formal" troops in Aden.

The Battle of Aden came to an end with pro-Hadi forces again seizing control of Aden port and moving into the city's commercial center. On 22 July, pro-Hadi forces had retaken full control of Aden, and the Aden Airport was reopened. In late July, an offensive launched by pro-Hadi forces drove Houthi forces out of the towns neighboring Aden.

On 4 September an Houthi OTR-21 Tochka missile hit an ammunition dump at a military base in Safer in Ma'rib Governorate killing 52 UAE, 10 Saudi, and 5 Bahraini soldiers. The Safer base was being built up by coalition forces for a push against Sanaa. "It was the deadliest single attack on coalition soldiers since the start of its operation against Houthi rebels in March" Asseri said. The attack was the highest casualty loss in the history of the UAE military. Qatar deployed 1000 troops to Yemen after the incident.

By 8 September it was reported that the Saudi-led forces deployed in Yemen exceeded 10,000 troops and included 30 AH-64 Apache attack helicopters.

On 14 December media reported a Houthi & Saleh Forces missile attack at a Saudi military camp south-west of the besieged city of Taiz, while sources confirmed the killings of over 150 coalition soldiers including 23 Saudi troops, 9 UAE officers and soldiers, 7 Moroccan soldiers and 42 Blackwater troops.

On 19 December 2015, reported clashes leaves over 40 Houthi rebels and 35 government loyalists dead, with dozens wounded on both sides.

In June 2018, anti-Houthi forces led by Saudi Arabia and the United Arab Emirates assaulted the port of Hodeidah, in an effort to dislodge Houthi forces.

In January 2022, Yemeni troops backed by the Saudi-led coalition took control of the entire Shabwah Governorate from the Houthis. This operation was supported and directed by the United Arab Emirates.

=== Naval involvement ===
Estimated fuel needs in Yemen and monthly fuel imports
View chart definition.

Saudi Arabia faced growing criticism for the Saudi-led naval and air blockade, which effectively isolated the country.

A "military source and pro-Hadi militiamen" told the AFP on 26 April 2015 that coalition warships were participating in the shelling of Aden.

On 30 April, the Iranian navy announced it had deployed two destroyers to the Gulf of Aden to "ensure the safety of commercial ships of our country against the threat of pirates", according to a rear admiral. According to the same source, the deployment was scheduled to last until mid-June. Iran's deputy foreign minister, Hossein Amir-Abdollahian, told state-run Tasnim News Agency, "others will not be allowed to put our shared security at risk with military adventures".

==== UN verification mechanism and the evolving blockade (2016–2022) ====
To address continued disruption of commercial shipping under the coalition blockade, the United Nations Office for Project Services (UNOPS) operationalized the UN Verification and Inspection Mechanism for Yemen (UNVIM) on 2 May 2016. Based in Djibouti, UNVIM was tasked with clearing cargo vessels bound for Houthi-held Red Sea ports under UN Security Council Resolution 2216. By the end of 2016 the mechanism had cleared several hundred vessels carrying millions of tonnes of food, fuel and other supplies, though Human Rights Watch documented that the coalition continued to delay or divert fuel tankers even after UNVIM had granted clearance. Restrictions tightened sharply in November 2017, when the coalition halted nearly all shipping to Houthi-controlled ports for roughly three weeks following a ballistic missile fired toward Riyadh, deepening fuel and food shortages before a partial reopening later that month.

A planned coalition offensive against the port city of Hodeidah was averted when government and Houthi delegations reached the Stockholm Agreement on 13 December 2018, providing for a ceasefire and mutual redeployment of forces from Hodeidah and the smaller ports of Salif and Ras Isa. A UN mission (UNMHA) was deployed to monitor the agreement, and although full redeployment of forces was never completed, the ceasefire around the port largely held even as fighting continued on other fronts.

A more substantial easing followed the UN-brokered nationwide truce that took effect on 2 April 2022. Fuel tankers were thereafter permitted into Hodeidah largely without the delays in coalition "holding areas" that had previously been routine, and by early 2023 UNVIM data showed no fuel or bulk food vessel had been denied clearance to the port for almost a year. The truce formally lapsed on 2 October 2022 after the warring parties failed to agree on an extension, but neither side resumed cross-border drone or missile attacks, and the calm at sea persisted in practice into 2023.

==== Houthi attacks on shipping and the Red Sea crisis (2023–2025) ====
The nature of naval involvement in the Yemen conflict was transformed by the Gaza war, which began in October 2023. As the Houthis began launching missiles and drones at Israel, several were intercepted by US and allied naval and air defences operating in the Red Sea. On 19 November 2023, Houthi fighters used a helicopter to board and seize the car carrier Galaxy Leader in the southern Red Sea, detaining its 25 crew members; the Houthis cited the vessel's links to an Israeli businessman, while Western officials suggested an Iranian intelligence-gathering ship in the area may have helped identify the target. The seizure opened a sustained campaign against shipping the group deemed Israeli-linked, which within weeks expanded to vessels connected to dozens of other nationalities.

The United States responded by announcing the multinational Operation Prosperity Guardian on 18 December 2023 to escort merchant shipping, eventually drawing participation from more than twenty countries. On 11–12 January 2024 the United States and United Kingdom, with backing from several allies, launched Operation Poseidon Archer, striking some 60 Houthi missile, radar and storage sites with more than 150 precision-guided munitions; further rounds of strikes followed through 2024 under the same operation. Days later the UN Security Council adopted a resolution condemning the attacks and affirming the right of states to defend commercial and naval vessels transiting the Red Sea. On 19 February 2024 the European Union launched its own, explicitly defensive naval mission, EUNAVFOR Aspides, headquartered in Larissa, Greece, to escort merchant vessels and build maritime situational awareness without striking targets ashore.

Despite this naval build-up, Houthi attacks continued and at times escalated. The bulk carrier Rubymar sank off the Yemeni coast in March 2024 after being struck, the first vessel lost in the campaign. The bulk carrier Tutor sank in June 2024 after an attack involving an uncrewed surface vessel and missiles that killed a crew member, then the most sophisticated strike of the campaign. By October 2024 the United States estimated the Houthis had launched nearly 190 attacks on commercial and naval vessels since the campaign began, and container shipping capacity transiting the Red Sea was running roughly 64 percent below pre-crisis levels.

A Gaza ceasefire in January 2025 briefly stilled the Houthi campaign, and on 22 January the group released the Galaxy Leader's crew after 14 months in captivity, in a handover mediated by Oman. When that ceasefire later broke down, the United States launched an expanded campaign of strikes, Operation Rough Rider, from March to May 2025 in an effort to compel a lasting end to the attacks. The campaign ended in May 2025 with an Oman-brokered agreement under which the Houthis agreed to stop targeting US vessels in exchange for a halt to US strikes, though the deal did not extend to Israeli-linked shipping. Attacks on other shipping resumed in July 2025: early that month the Houthis sank two further bulk carriers, the Magic Seas and the Eternity C, killing four of the latter's crew and taking eleven others captive, before declaring a "fourth phase" of their campaign targeting any vessel whose operating company had dealings with Israeli ports, regardless of flag.

The campaign wound down again after a further Gaza ceasefire took hold in October 2025; the Houthis suspended attacks on shipping and Israel, and in November formally announced an end to the campaign and the lifting of their blockade on Israeli ports.

==== Renewed tensions amid the 2026 Iran war ====
By January 2026, the lull had allowed major carriers including Maersk and CMA CGM to resume scheduled Red Sea services, but the calm proved temporary. After Israel and the United States launched strikes on Iran in late February 2026, opening the 2026 Iran war, the Houthis warned on 28 February that they would resume attacks on Israel and on Red Sea shipping. The group resumed direct strikes on Israel on 28 March 2026, and separately warned it might close the Bab-el-Mandeb strait if Gulf Arab states joined the war against Iran, raising fears of a second maritime chokepoint crisis alongside Iran's disruption of the Strait of Hormuz. In practice, the group limited itself to a small number of missile and drone strikes on Israel rather than a renewed large-scale maritime campaign, restraint that analysts linked to pressure from regional actors and concern over the group's domestic standing in Yemen.

Following a ceasefire between the United States, Israel and Iran, the Houthis kept up only sporadic strikes on Israel while reportedly using the lull to improve the range and accuracy of their missile arsenal, according to Western intelligence sources. On 8 June 2026 the group announced a renewed, complete ban on Israeli-flagged or Israeli-linked vessels transiting the Red Sea, branding them "legitimate military targets", even as its wider campaign against non-Israeli shipping remained suspended. European and other coalition naval forces remained deployed in the area under extended mandates; the EU's Operation Aspides mission, for instance, was extended in February 2026 through February 2027. As of late June 2026, with the Strait of Hormuz only slowly reopening under its own ceasefire, the prospect of renewed large-scale Houthi attacks on the Red Sea continued to weigh on global shipping and energy markets.

=== Scale and participation of Saudi-led coalition members ===
Pakistan was called on by Saudi Arabia to join the coalition, but its parliament voted to maintain neutrality. In February 2016, Constellis (commonly known as Blackwater, named Academi at the time) withdrew from front-line duties in the Yemen campaign. Qatar was suspended from the coalition due to the 2017 Qatar diplomatic crisis. Morocco ended their participation in 2019 due to deterioration of Morocco–Saudi Arabia relations followed by United Arab Emirates in July 2019 amid possible tensions with Iran on the Persian Gulf and differences with Saudi Arabia. Sudan announced its decision to reduce troops commitment from 15,000 to 5,000 in early December 2019.

Saudi Arabia had 2,500 troops deployed for Operation Restoring Hope as of 2024, a total of two armored brigades from the Royal Saudi Land Forces, according to the International Institute for Strategic Studies.

== Reports of war crimes ==
Airstrikes in Yemen apparently violating the laws of war (selection) HRW investigation of 10 Saudi-led coalition airstrikes, that took place between 11 April and 30 August 2015. HRW found either no evident military target or the attack failed to distinguish civilians from military objectives, in apparent violation of the laws of war.
Date (in 2015)	Location / governorate	Objectives or targets struck	Civilians killed (at least)				Civilians injured
Date (in 2015)	Location / governorate	Objectives or targets struck	Men	Women	Children	Total	Civilians injured
11 April	Amran / Amran	buildings in the town	1	2	1	4	1
12 May	Abs / Hajjah	Abs/Kholan Prison and other buildings in the town	21	1	3	25	18
12 May	Zabid / Al Hudaydah	Shagia market and lemon grove in the town	39	13	8	60	155
4 July	Muthalith Ahim / Al Hudaydah	marketplace in the village	?	?	3	65	105
6 July	Amran	1. Bawn market between Amran und Raydah; 2. Jawb market outside the town	13	1	15	29	20
12 July	Sanaa-Sawan / Sanaa	muhamashee residential neighborhood	2	7	14	23	31
19 July	Yarim / Ibb	residential homes and buildings in the town	4	3	9	16	16
24 July	Mocha / Taiz	residential compound of Mokha Steam Power Plant	42	13	10	65	55
8 August	Shara'a / Ibb	homes in the village (Radhma district)	2	3	3	8	2
30 August	Abs / Hajjah	Al-Sham Water Bottling Factory in the outskirts of the town	11		3	14	11
Civilian airstrike casualties for all 10 airstrikes, investigated by HRW (report of 26 November 2015)			309				414

The Saudi-led campaign has received widespread criticism and had a dramatic worsening effect on the humanitarian situation in Yemen, that reached the level of a "humanitarian disaster" or "humanitarian catastrophe". The war has contributed to the famine in Yemen which has threatened over 17 million people, according to the UN, as well as an outbreak of cholera which has infected hundreds of thousands.

After the Saudi-led coalition declared the entire Saada Governorate a military target in May 2015, the UN's Humanitarian Coordinator for Yemen and Human Rights Watch expressed concern that the bombing there was unnecessarily harming civilians. On 1 July 2015, the UN declared for Yemen a "level-three" emergency—the highest UN emergency level—for a period of six months. Human rights groups repeatedly blamed the Saudi-led military coalition for killing civilians and destroying health centres and other infrastructure with airstrikes.

In June 2015, aid agencies said the de facto blockade of Yemen had dramatically worsened the humanitarian situation, with 78% (20 million) of the population in urgent need of food, water and medical aid. Aid ships are allowed, but the bulk of commercial shipping, on which the country relies, is blocked. In one incident, coalition jets prevented an Iranian Red Crescent plane from landing by bombing Sanaa International Airport's runway, which blocked aid delivery by air.

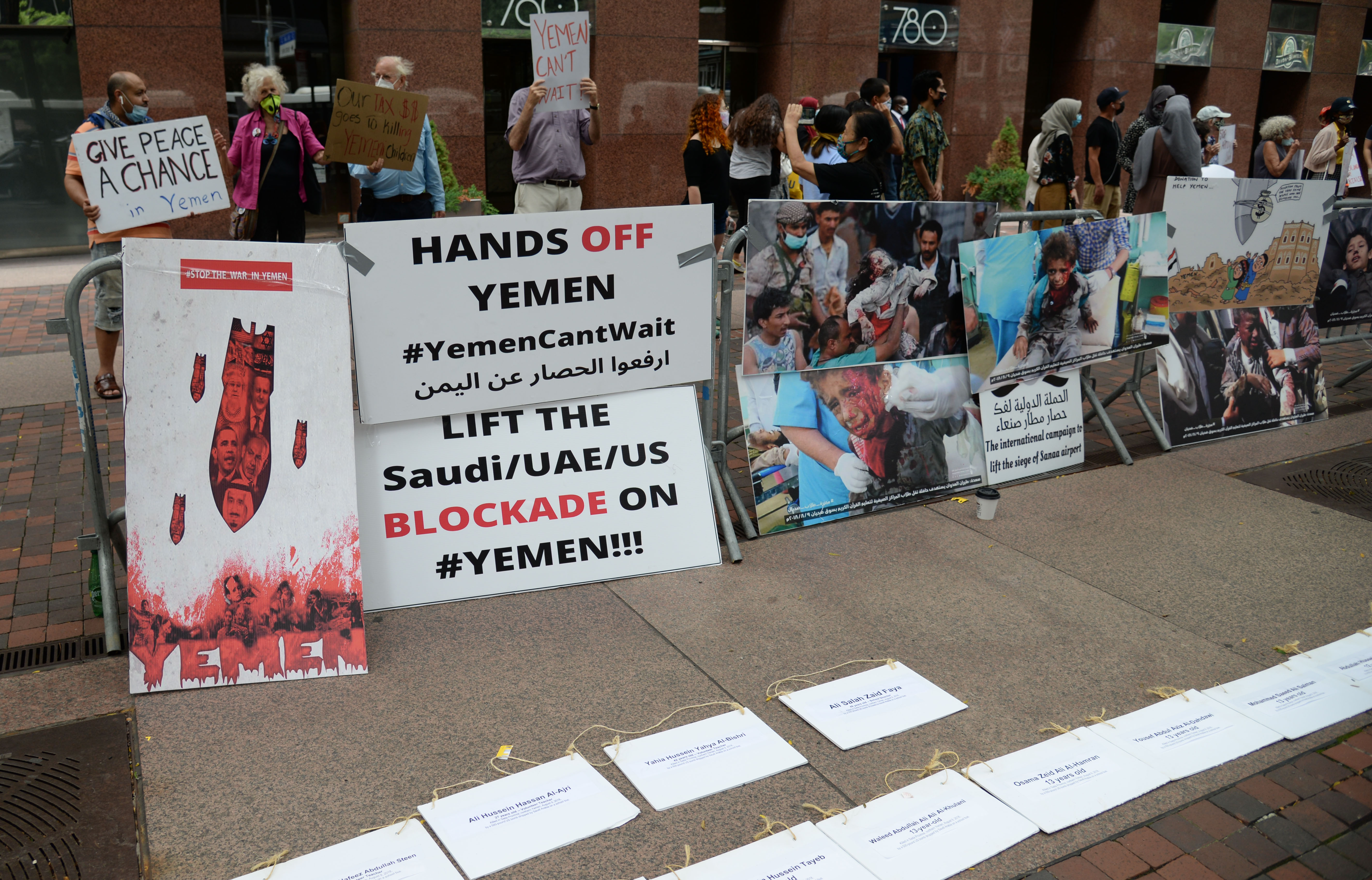
Protest against the military intervention in Yemen on 14 August 2020

According to Farea Al-Muslim, direct war crimes were committed during the conflict; for example, an IDP (internally displaced person) camp was hit by a Saudi airstrike, while Houthis sometimes prevented aid workers from giving aid. The UN and human rights groups discussed the possibility that war crimes may have been committed by Saudi Arabia during the air campaign.

US Representative Ted Lieu has criticized the Saudi-led attacks on Yemen: "Some of these strikes look like war crimes to me, and I want to get answers as to why the US appears to be assisting in the execution of war crimes in Yemen."

In March 2017, Human Rights Watch (HRW) reported, "Since the start of the current conflict, at least 4,773 civilians had been killed and 8,272 wounded, the majority by coalition airstrikes.... Human Rights Watch has documented 62 apparently unlawful coalition airstrikes, some of which may amount to war crimes, that have killed nearly 900 civilians, and documented seven indiscriminate attacks by Houthi-Saleh forces in Aden and Taizz that killed 139 people, including at least eight children."

In an April 2020 report, Human Rights Watch said that war crimes committed by Saudi Arabia and United Arab Emirates in Yemen go unmentioned. They stated that these countries were responsible for most child casualties and illegal attacks on schools. On December third, 2020, more than 60 organizations urged the U.N. General Assembly to establish an investigative body to gather and preserve evidence of serious human rights violations during Yemen's seven-year conflict, including possible war crimes and crimes against humanity.

On 20 December 2021, the Saudi-led coalition carried out air raids at the international airport in the Yemeni capital, Sanaa. As a result of these airstrikes, UN aid flights into Sanaa were halted as the airport was no longer able to receive aircraft operated by the United Nations or international humanitarian organisations. Since 2016, humanitarian flights into Sanaa airport have been largely interrupted by a Saudi-led blockade.

According to a report released in December 2022 by the Largest Dutch and Yemeni humanitarian organizations, PAX and Mwatana, the Houthis and the Saudi/UAE-led coalition have used explosive weapons in densely populated areas "extensively" throughout the duration of the Yemen conflict. In the report it is said that Mwatana had independently documented 1,044 coalition airstrikes that caused 7,591 civilian casualties, and 805 ground-launched attacks perpetrated by both parties that resulted in 2,636 civilian casualties by August 2022. The further accusation is made that the Saudi/UAE-led coalition's use of guided missiles against civilian targets is in breach of International humanitarian law, a claim evidenced through photos containing the remnants of 2 GBU-12 Paveway IIs supposedly in 2 family houses where 15 innocents are said to have died. The 3 instances discussed in that report are in addition to the 27 Mwatana had already provided in a report published 2 year prior with the University Network for Human Rights showing Precision-guided munition remnants present in alleged war crimes targeting 16 "civilian gatherings and structures," 5 "educational and health facilities," 5 "civilian businesses" and a "government cultural center" where "at least 203" civilians died is claimed to suggest "the Saudi/UAE-led Coalition airstrikes ... violate IHL's requirements of distinction and proportionality."

On August 21, 2023, The Washington Post reported that Saudi security forces killed hundreds of Ethiopian migrants and asylum seekers attempting to cross the country's border with Yemen, according to Human Rights Watch. The Saudis allegedly shot at people at close range and fired explosive weapons at groups in the mountains, in what could amount to crimes against humanity.

=== Attacks on facilities run by aid organizations ===
Since the Saudi-led coalition began military operations against Houthi on 26 March 2015, Saudi-led coalition airstrikes unlawfully struck hospitals and other facilities run by aid organizations, according to Human Rights Watch. Médecins Sans Frontières (MSF) medical facilities in Yemen were attacked four times in three months. On 26 October 2015, HRW documented six Saudi-led airstrikes which bombed a MSF hospital in Haydan district (Saada Governorate), wounding two patients. MSF's director of operations Raquel Ayora said: "The way war is being waged in Yemen is causing enormous suffering and shows that the warring parties do not recognise or respect the protected status of hospitals and medical facilities. We witness the devastating consequences of this on people trapped in conflict zones on a daily basis. Nothing has been spared—not even hospitals, even though medical facilities are explicitly protected by international humanitarian law."

=== Saudi Arabia's response to accusations ===
On 16 May 2016, Brigadier General Ahmed Hassan Asiri responded to Human Rights Watch's accusations, stating that Saudi Arabia's actions are not motivated by self-interest, but rather "because we saw population undermined and oppressed by the militias". Ahmed Asiri claimed that Human Rights Watch did not have a team on the ground in Yemen, and when told by Mary Louise Kelly during an interview that Human Rights Watch had visited Yemen, stated "No. No one can get in Yemen without the permission of the coalition".

Human Rights Watch responded to these statements on 16 May 2016. Belkis Wille stated, "In fact, this two-week trip was the fourth I had made to Yemen since the beginning of the war in March 2015. Given what I go through to get into Yemen, al-Assiri's statement was laughable". She stated that on each of her visits to Yemen during this time period her passport has been confiscated, with no reason being given. She claims that this indicates that the coalition knows that she is visiting Yemen.

After initially denying responsibility, on 15 October 2016, Saudi Arabia admitted responsibility for the funeral airstrikes which killed at least 140 and injured 525. Saudi Arabian forces blamed the airstrikes on "wrong information" which was provided by an unnamed party, which had reportedly claimed the funeral was a legitimate target. Human Rights Watch has claimed that the airstrikes likely constitute a war crime, due to the indiscriminate nature of the attack.

=== Overall airstrike casualties ===
Year	Date	Place	Deaths	Source
2015	26 March – 7 April	Sanaa	88 civilians	U.N.
2015	26 March – 23 April	Sanaa	2019 people	U.N.
2015	30 March	Mazraq	29 civilians	U.N.
2015	31 March	Saada	19 civilians	U.N.
2015	31 March	Ibb province	14 people (11 civilians)	Local sources
2015	31 March	Wadi Saan	10 civilians	Local sources
2015	31 March	Hodeida governorate	31 civilians	HRW
2015	4 April	Sanaa governorate	9 civilians of the same family	Reuters via local sources
2015	7 April	Maitam	3 civilians	Local sources
2015	12 April	Taiz	8 civilians	Local sources
2015	14 April	Taiz	10 civilians	Amnesty International
2015	17 April	Yarim, south of Sanaa	7 civilians	Local sources
2015	17 April	Sanaa	8 civilians	
2015	18 April	Saada	1 civilian	Local sources
2015	19–29 April	Haradh	15 people	U.N.
2015	20 April	Fajj Atan military base, Sanaa	91 people	ICRC
2015	21 April–5 May	Aden	22 civilians	U.N.
2015	21 April	Ibb province	20 people	Local sources
2015	21 April	Haradh	9 people	Local sources
2015	26 April	Al-Thawra hospital, Taiz	19 people	U.N.
2015	27 April	Aden	2 civilians	Local sources
2015	27–28 April	Bajel District	30 people	U.N.
2015	28 April	between Al-Qaras and Basatir	40 civilians	Local sources
2015	1 May	Sanaa	17 civilians	U.N.
2015	6 May	Sadaa	34 people including at least 27 civilians	U.N. and HRW
2015	6 May	Sanaa	20 people	U.N.
2015	6 May	Kitaf	7 civilians	Local sources
2015	6 May	Dhamar governorate	11 people	Local sources
2015	9 May	Saada	4 civilians	U.N.
2015	11 May	Sanaa	5 people	Agence France-Presse
2015	14 May	Saada	9 people	Associated Press
2015	21 May	Hajjah Governorate	5 civilians	U.N
2015	26 May	Saada	7 civilians	Local sources
2015	26 May	Taiz	8 civilians	Amnesty International
2015	27 May	Saada and Yemen	80–100 people	Reuters
2015	4 June	Across Yemen	58 people	Local sources
2015	6 June	Across Yemen	38 people	Local sources
2015	7 June	Sanaa	44 people	Local sources
2015	12 June	Old City of Sanaa	6 people	Local sources
2015	13 June	Bait Me'yad, Sanaa	9 people	Medical sources
2015	16 June	Taiz	5 civilians	Amnesty International
2015	19 June	Across Yemen	10 civilians	Local sources
2015	21 June	Across Yemen	15 people	BBC
2015	30 June	Saada	2 people	Local sources
2015	30 June	Taiz	4 civilians	Amnesty International
2015	2 July	Sanaa	8 people	Houthi-controlled Saba News Agency.
2015	3 July	Across Yemen	16 people	Local sources
2015	6 July	Across Yemen	100 people	Local and medical sources
2015	7 July	Taiz	11 Lahj	Amnesty International
2015	9 July	Taiz	11 Lahj	Amnesty International
2015	25 July	Mokha, Yemen	120 civilians	Associated Press
2015	17 August	Jibla and Al-Jawf	17 civilians	Local officials
2015	19 August	Sanaa	15 civilians	UN
2015	21 August	Taiz	65 civilians	Doctors Without Borders
2015	28 August	Taiz	10 people	Reuters
2015	30 August	Hajjah and Sanaa	40 civilians	Local sources
2015	5 September	Sanaa	27 civilians	Reuters
2015	6 September	Al Jawf Governorate	30 people	Reuters
2015	12 September	Across Yemen	16 civilians	Reuters
2015	14 September	Sanaa, Yemen	10 people	Reuters
2015	20 September	Saada	20 People	Reuters
2015	21 September	Hajjah and Sanaa	50 people	Reuters
2015	27 September	Hajjah	30 civilians	Local sources
2015	28 September	Al-Wahijah, Taiz	131 civilians	Medics
2015	8 October	Dhamar, Yemen	25–50 people	Reuters
2016	10 January	Saada, Yemen	6 civilians	Doctors Without Borders
2016	13 January	Bilad al-Rus	15 civilians	Local sources
2016	27 February	Sanaa	40 civilians	Reuters
2016	15 March	Mastaba	at least 119 people	UN
2016	20 June	Sanaa	8 civilians	Yemeni officials
2016	7 August	Nehm district	18 civilians	Local officials
2016	9 August	Sanaa	13 civilians	Reuters
2016	13 August	Saada	19 civilians	MSF
2016	15 August	Hajjah province	19 civilians	MSF
2016	10 September	Arhab district	30 people	UN
2016	21 September	Al Hudaydah Governorate	26 civilians	Reuters
2016	8 October	Sanaa	140 people	UN
2016	29 October	Hodeidah	60 inmates	Reuters
2016	28 November	Hodeidah	at least 13 civilians	Yemeni officials
2017	1 January	Sirwah District	5 civilians	Military officials
2017	7 January	Sanaa	12 civilians	Medics
2017	10 January	Nihm District	8 children	Rescuers
2017	15 February	north of Sanaa	10 women and children	Reuters
2017	10 March	Al Khawkhah district	18 civilians	UN
2017	15 March	Mastaba	119 people	Human Rights Watch
2017	16 March	Bab-el-Mandeb	42 Somali refugees	UN
2017	3 April	Sarawah District	8 civilians	Security and tribal officials
2017	17 May	Mawza District	23 civilians	Houthis
2017	17 June	Saada Governorate	24 civilians	Health officials
2017	18 July	al-Atera village, Mawza District	20+ civilians	UN
2017	23 August	Arhab, Sanaa	48+ civilians	Medical officials
2017	26 December	Taiz, Hodeidah	68 civilians	UN
2018	3 April	Hodeidah	14+ civilians	Medics
2018	23 April	Hajja	40+ civilians	Medical officials
2018	9 August	Saada	51 killed, including 40 children	International Committee of the Red Cross; Houthi Health Ministry
2018	13 October	Hodeidah	17 people	Deutsche Welle
2018	24 October	Al Hudaydah Governorate	21+ civilians	UN
2019	29 July	Saada Governorate	13+ civilians	Medics
2019	1 September	Dhamar	100+ civilians	Red Cross (ICRC)
2020	15 February	Al Jawf Governorate	31+ civilians	UN
2020	8 August	Al Jawf Governorate	20+ women and children	UN, Houthis
2022	21 January	Saada	100+ people	MSF, Houthis

HRW-investigation of six apparently unlawful airstrikes in residential areas of Sanaa city in September and October 2015, that (according to HRW) failed to distinguish civilians from military objectives or caused disproportionate civilian loss
Date	Location	Objectives struck	Civilians killed (at least)				Civilians injured (if known)
Date	Location	Objectives struck	Men	Women	Children	Total	Civilians injured (if known)
4 September	Hadda Neighborhood, Sanaa	four-story apartment building	0	1	2	3	
18 September	Marib Street, Sanaa	house and unused iron lathe workshop	3	1	1	5	8
18 September	Old City, Sanaa	buildings of the World Heritage Site	4	2	7	13	12
21 September	Al-Hassaba Neighborhood, Sanaa	homes in the densely populated residential area	3	6	11	20	?
23 September	Al-Asbahi Neighborhood, Sanaa	buildings in the residential neighborhood	7	2	10	19	?
26 October	Thabwa, Sanaa	buildings in the residential neighborhood					2
Civilian airstrike casualties for all 6 airstrikes, investigated by HRW (report of 21 December 2015)			60				?

== Foreign support and funding ==
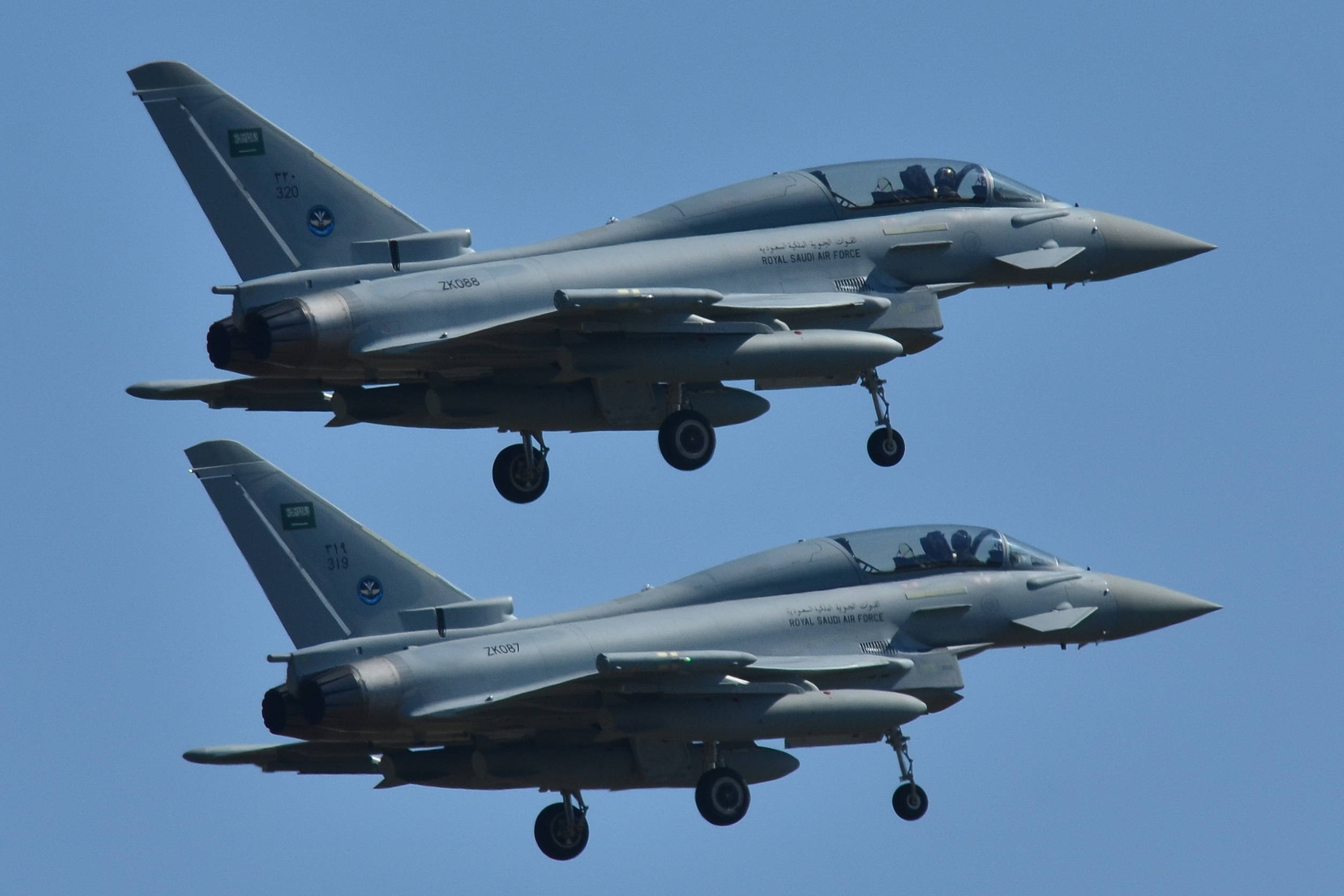
Saudi Arabia's UK-supplied Eurofighter Typhoons are playing a central role in Saudi-led bombing campaign in Yemen.

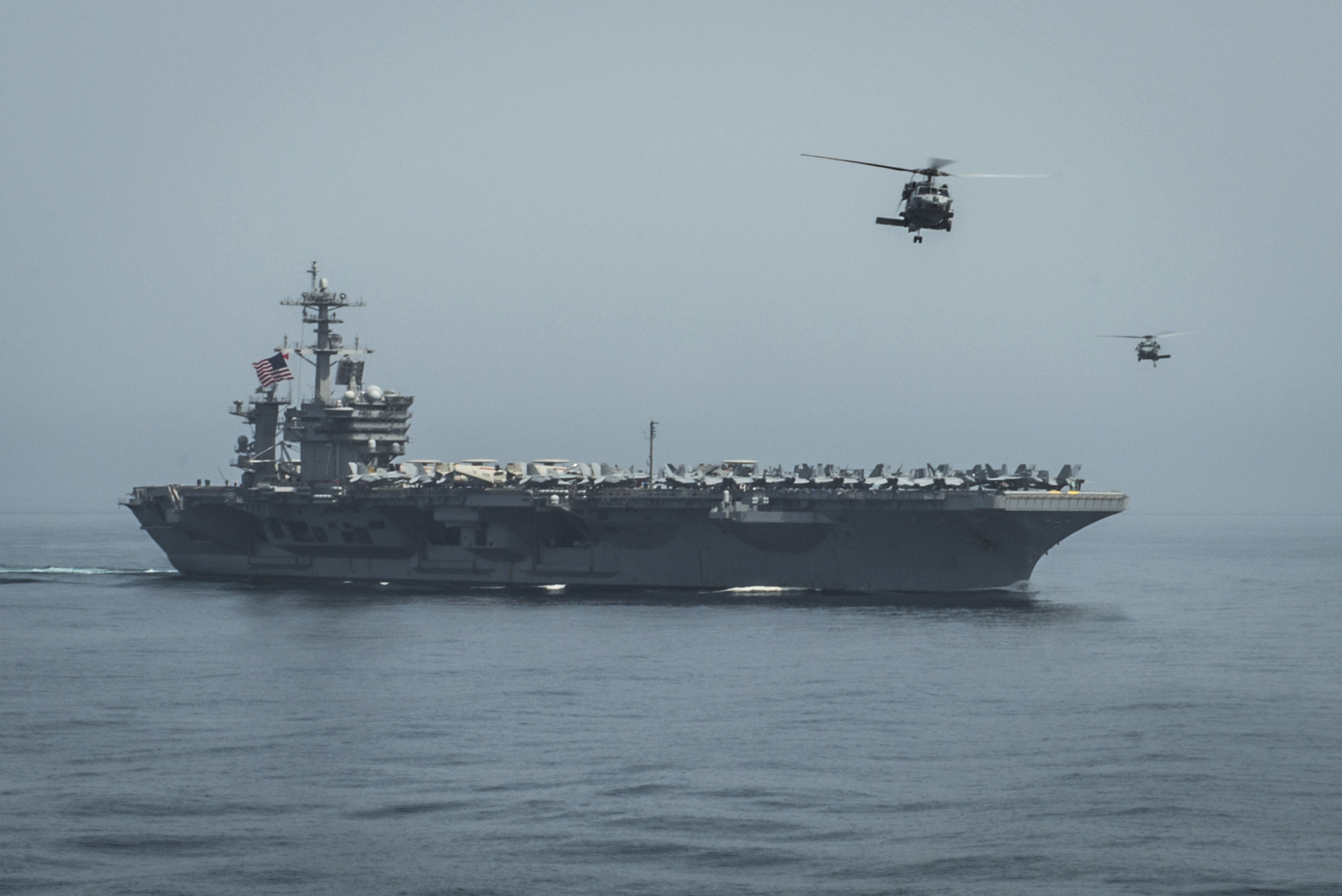
The U.S. Navy has actively participated in the Saudi-led naval blockade, which humanitarian organizations argue has been the main contributing factor to the outbreak of famine in Yemen.

In March 2015, President Barack Obama declared that he had authorized U.S. forces to provide logistical and intelligence support to the Saudis in their military intervention in Yemen. Then-Deputy Secretary of State Antony Blinken said, "as part of that effort, we have expedited weapons deliveries, we have increased our intelligence sharing, and we have established a joint coordination planning cell in the Saudi operation centre."

NATO powers such as the United Kingdom and the United States support the Saudi Arabian–led intervention in Yemen primarily through arms sales and technical assistance. France has also sold weapons to Saudi Arabia. MSF emergency coordinator Karline Kleijer called the US, France and the UK part of the Saudi-led coalition, which imposed the weapons embargo and blocked all ships from entering Yemen with supplies. Rights groups have criticized the countries for supplying arms, and accuse the coalition of using cluster munitions, which are banned in most countries. Oxfam pointed out that Germany, Iran, and Russia have also reportedly sold arms to the conflicting forces. Tariq Riebl, head of programmes in Yemen for Oxfam, said, "it's difficult to argue that a weapon sold to Saudi Arabia would not in some way be used in Yemen," or "if it's not used in Yemen it enables the country to use other weapons in Yemen." Amnesty International urged the U.S. and the UK to stop supplying arms to Saudi Arabia and to the Saudi-led coalition. On August 3, 2019, a United Nations report said the US, UK and France may be complicit in committing war crimes in Yemen by selling weapons and providing support to the Saudi-led coalition which it accused of using starvation of civilians as a tactic of warfare.

In 2016, the United States government sold $1.3 billion of arms to Saudi Arabia despite concerns from officials that it could be complicit in war crimes through its support for the Saudi Arabian-led coalition in Yemen. U.S. government lawyers were unable to conclude whether the U.S. support for the coalition made them a co-belligerents under international law.

Arms sales by the United Kingdom to Saudi Arabia and the United Arab Emirates in 2019 reportedly soared by £1 billion, a 300% increase from 2018. Campaign Against Arms Trade spokesperson Andrew Smith condemned the increase and claimed that the UK arms industry "is dominated by human rights abusers, despots and dictatorships." According to official figures released by the Department for International Trade (DIT), British firms, most notably BAE Systems, exported £11 billion worth of arms in 2019, becoming the second-largest arms exporter after the United States. Although a June 2019 court ruling halted the sale of UK arms to the Saudis which could be used in Yemen, such sales resumed in June following a review by the British government.

In January 2020, the U.S. State Department told lawmakers that it was planning to permit Raytheon to sell precision-guided missiles worth $478 million to Saudi Arabia and expand its manufacturing inside the country, despite the kingdom's human rights record and objections by both Democratic and Republican lawmakers. On February 4, 2021, the new President Joe Biden announced an end to U.S. support for Saudi-led operations in Yemen. However, U.S. arms sales have continued.

In early June 2020, the French government published a report on the arms exports of 2019, where the sale of €1.4 billion arms was made to Saudi Arabia. Human Rights Watch urged the French authorities to halt any arms sale to Saudi, considering that the country was accused of possible war crimes and human rights abuses in Yemen. In July 2020, Amnesty International revealed that France had promoted a private military center to train Saudi troops and backed it both financially and politically. According to the report, France intended to train the Saudi soldiers in the operations of the latest versions of weapons that had already been used in the Yemeni conflict. The training center has been set up at the town of Commercy in Meuse with funds extracted from the French taxpayer's money, violating international treaties, as per Lebel.

In September 2020, a United Nations panel listed Canada among the countries who contributed to fueling the war in Yemen. Following that, 39 human rights organizations, arms-control groups and labor unions, including the Public Service Alliance of Canada, sent a joint letter to Canadian Prime Minister Justin Trudeau urging him to end arms exports to Saudi Arabia.

The Saudi-led coalition used a precision-guided munition developed in the United States in an air hit on a detention facility in Saada in northwestern Yemen that killed at least 80 people and injured over 200, according to Doctors Without Borders. The laser-guided bomb used in the raid was made by Raytheon, a U.S. defence company.

On 2 February 2022, following a spate of missile assaults by Yemeni rebels, the U.S announced it would deploy a guided-missile destroyer and cutting-edge fighter jets to help defend the United Arab Emirates.

On 6 February 2022, the commander of U.S. Central Command arrived in the UAE to expand on previous Pentagon announcements to assist the country in bolstering its defenses following attacks in Yemen by Iranian-backed rebels.

In a June 2022 joint analysis, The Washington Post in association with the Security Force Monitor, a research organization at Columbia Law School's Human Rights Institute, reported that the United States supported the majority of the Saudi-led coalition's air force squadrons. A large portion of the coalition airstrikes were carried out by aircraft developed, maintained and sold by U.S. companies and were flown by pilots trained by the U.S. military. Out of the 39 air force units of the coalition that could have conducted airstrikes, 38 likely benefited from U.S.-approved contracts, and in the seven years since the beginning of the bombing campaign, the U.S. approved 213 out of the 902 total contracts that potentially served the coalition's air force units.

On 7 June 2022, an internal report from the U.S. Government Accountability Office (GAO) was released which concluded that the State Department and the Defense Department had failed to properly assess war crimes allegations against the Saudi-led coalition and had not adequately tracked civilian deaths caused by U.S.-made weapons. The report concluded that there were serious gaps in U.S. government oversight on how arms sold to Saudi Arabia and the UAE were used.

Yemeni citizen Ayman Mohammed Saleh Al-Sanabani filed a lawsuit against Saudi Arabia and the UAE, the U.S. State and Defense departments, Raytheon, Lockheed Martin and General Dynamics, accusing them of human rights abuses in Yemen. In an opinion piece published in The Guardian in March 2023, he said his family, including his bride, were massacred on his wedding day in a missile attack by Saudi Arabia and the UAE in October 2015. Ayman Mohamed also accused the U.S. of complicity in the tragedy and war crimes in Yemen. He further accused the U.S. and its defense contractors of complicity in the humanitarian crisis in the country. He also called on President Biden to fulfill his campaign promise and stop the arms sales to Saudi Arabia.

== Operation costs ==
In December 2015, David Ottaway, a senior scholar at the Wilson Center in Washington, estimated that the Saudi-led military coalition was spending $200 million a day on military operations in Yemen. His sources speculated that the Saudis were supplying most of the funding.

On 20 October 2020, the Swiss State Secretariat for Economic Affairs published a report stating that Swiss companies exported war material to the value of almost 690 million francs. According to this report, Saudi Arabia bought war material from Switzerland for 3.8 million francs.

== Responses ==
=== In Yemen ===
==== Opposition ====
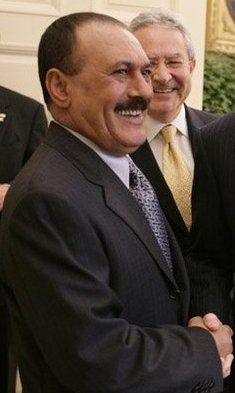
Yemen's former president Ali Abdullah Saleh was initially allied with Houthis, until they assassinated him on account of treason.

Following the call by the leader of the Houthi movement, Abdul-Malik al-Houthi, tens of thousands of Yemenis of various socioeconomic backgrounds took to the streets of the rebel-controlled capital, Sanaa, to voice their anger at the Saudi intervention.

On 21 April 2015, representatives of 19 Yemeni political parties and associations rejected UN Resolution 2216, stating that it encouraged terrorist expansion, intervened in Yemen's sovereign affairs, violated Yemen's right of self-defence and emphasized the associations' support of the Yemeni Army.

On 23 April, a spokesman for the Houthis said UN-sponsored peace talks should continue, but only following "a complete halt of attacks" by the coalition.

In a televised address on 24 April, Saleh called on the Houthis and other armed groups to withdraw from the territory they had seized and participate in UN-sponsored peace talks, in exchange for an end to the air campaign. Exiled Yemeni Foreign Minister rejected the peace proposal saying that Saleh had no role in the talks.

On 26 April, the General Authority for Archeology and Museums in Yemen condemned attacks targeting historical sites. The statement highlighted an attack that completely destroyed an ancient fortress in the Damt District of the Ad Dali' Governorate. Yemeni political parties issued a letter to UN Secretary-General Ban Ki-moon requesting that he continue the peace talks. The letter emphasized that Yemen was still under attack by air, land and sea and that the existing blockade was increasing the humanitarian crisis and that education had been denied for 3 million students due to the "random attacks".

On 2 May 2015, the Yemenis Forum of Persons With Disability stated that 300 centres and organizations had been forced to stop operations following the intervention. The organization denounced the air and sea blockade that "increased the suffering of the disabled greatly". The same day Hussein al-Ezzi, the Houthi head of foreign relations, sent a letter addressed to Secretary General Ban seeking an end to the "unjustified Saudi aggression". He asked the UN to seek an end to what Houthis described as blatant aggression against the country.

On 7 May, 17 humanitarian agencies stressed that life-saving aid would run out in a week and emphasized the need to remove the existing blockade. The International Non-Government Organizations Forum in Yemen appealed for allowing basic materials to enter the country immediately.

On 10 May, Houthi military spokesman Sharaf Luqman welcomed the Russian initiative, which advocated a suspension of military operations and also lifting the blockade.

On 26 March 2017, the second anniversary of the war, over a hundred thousand Houthi supporters demonstrated in Sanaa protesting the Saudi aggression and expressing solidarity.

==== Support ====
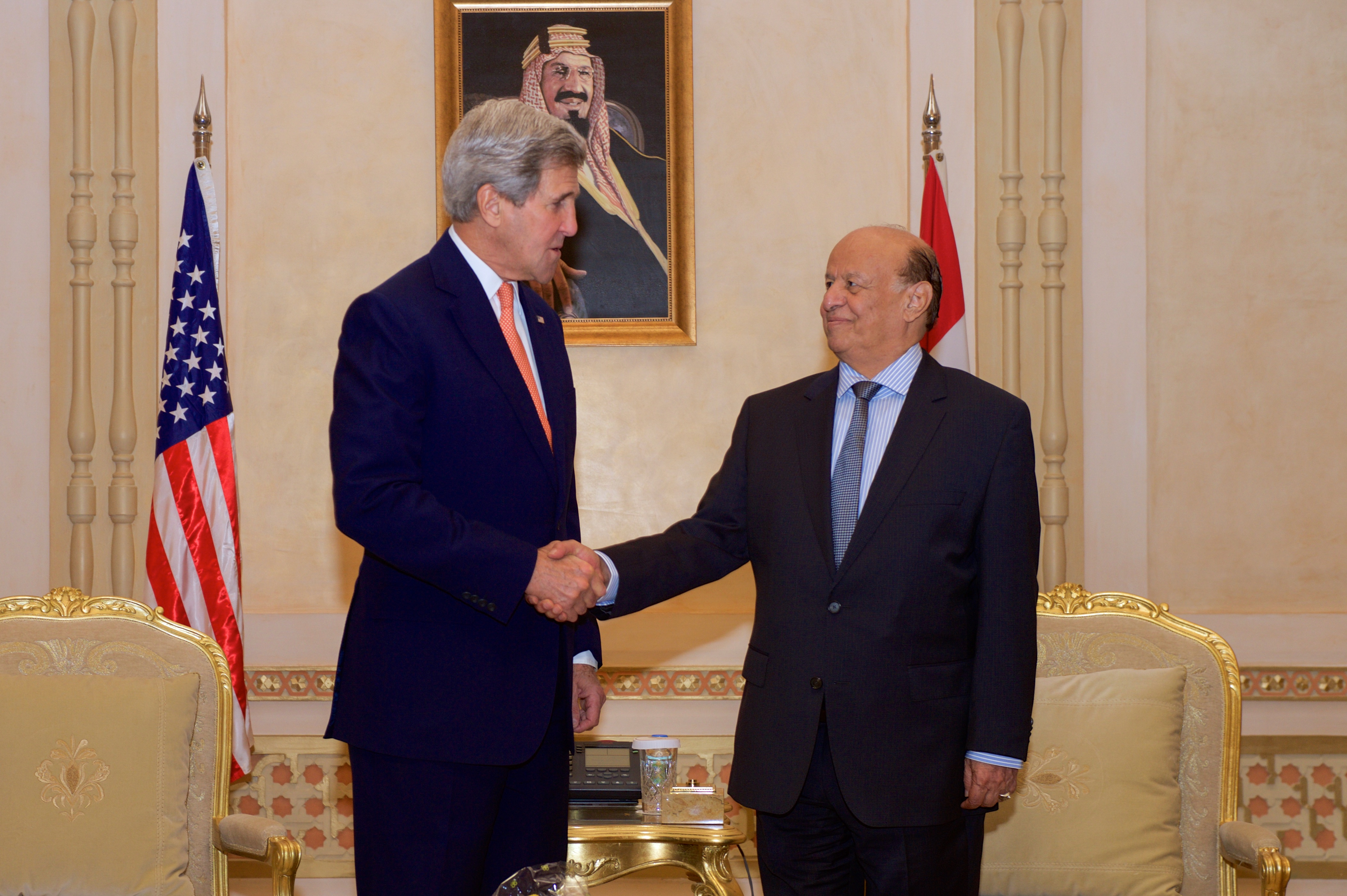
Yemen's President Abdrabbuh Mansur Hadi in Riyadh, Saudi Arabia, 7 May 2015

Anti-Houthi groups, especially Sunnis, while supporting the intervention did not wish for the return to power of Hadi, since they viewed him as the man "who ceded control of the capital without a fight six months ago".

On 3 April, the Al-Islah party, the Yemeni branch of the Muslim Brotherhood, declared its support for the campaign. Supporters of the party reportedly suffered consequences, including kidnappings and raids, as a result of this declaration.

On 26 April, the foreign minister in Hadi's government, Riad Yaseen, rejected Saleh's calls for UN-sponsored peace talks on the ground.

=== Saudi Arabia ===
==== Opposition ====
On 5 April a firefight broke out between anti-government Shiite rioters and security forces in Saudi Arabia's Shiite-minority in Eastern Province, with one police officer killed and three others injured. The firefight broke out after calls in the Eastern Province to protest against the military intervention.

On 29 April, King Salman dismissed his appointed crown prince, Muqrin of Saudi Arabia. Some regional political analysts speculated that the decision was precipitated by Muqrin's alleged opposition to the intervention. Salman appointed Muhammad bin Nayef, who publicly announced his support of the operation, to replace Muqrin.

==== Support ====
On 21 April, Saudi prince Al-Waleed bin Talal reportedly offered 100 Bentleys to participating pilots. The announcement was met with substantial criticism.

Among the general populace, the war was popular.

=== Other coalition countries ===
==== Bahrain ====
On 3 April, Bahrainis protested against the war on Yemen. A prominent Bahraini opposition politician, Fadhel Abbas, was reportedly arrested by Bahraini authorities for condemning the bombing as "flagrant aggression".

==== Egypt ====
Supporters of the Egyptian Muslim Brotherhood demonstrated against Egypt's military intervention.

==== Kuwait ====
Kuwaiti politician Abdul-Hamid Dashti reportedly criticized the war and described it as an "act of aggression". A prominent Kuwaiti lawyer, Khalid Al Shatti, was summoned by Kuwaiti authorities for his criticism of the Saudi government.

On 28 April, Kuwaiti Foreign Minister Sabah Al-Khalid Al-Sabah stated that the only solution to the Yemen crisis was political.

=== International ===
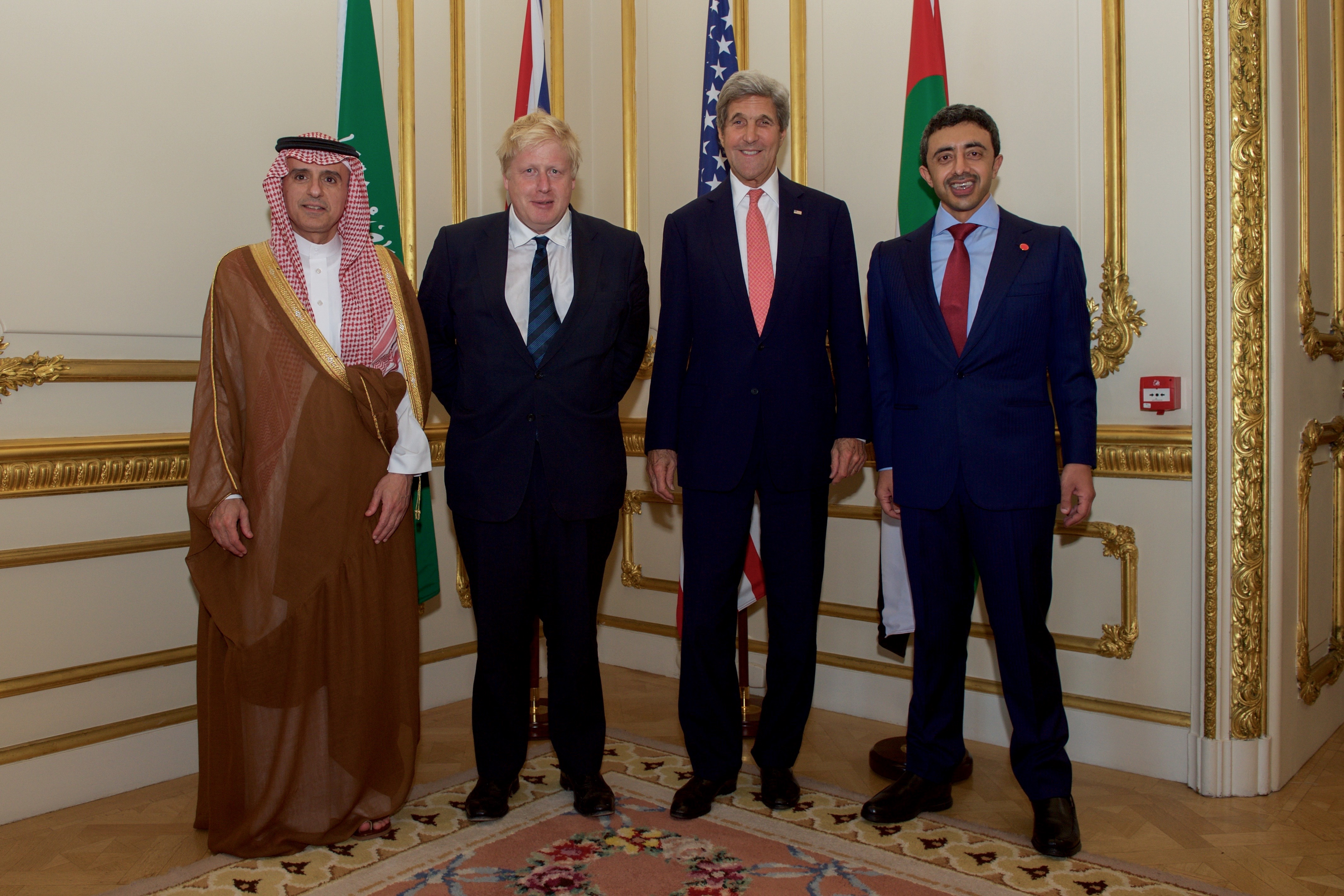
Foreign Ministers of the U.S., the U.K., Saudi Arabia and the United Arab Emirates, before a working dinner focused on Yemen, 19 July 2016

The Arab League, United States, Turkey, OIC and Hamas voiced support for the intervention, but the European Union, Russia and the United Nations criticised it. The United Kingdom, and France supported the intervention, and along with Canada have supplied the Saudi military with equipment.

Iran condemned the intervention as "US-backed aggression". Iran's U.N. Ambassador Gholamali Khoshroo said, "those who violate international law, including international humanitarian law, should be held accountable for their acts and there should be no room for impunity." Iraqi Prime Minister Haidar al-Abadi expressed the Iraqi government's opposition to the intervention: "This (Yemen war) can engulf the whole region in another conflict. We don't need another sectarian war in the region." The Hezbollah secretary general criticized Saudi Arabia and its allies, saying "all invaders end up being defeated".

The Chinese foreign ministry expressed in January 2016 its support for the intervention and the Hadi government, while stressing its desire for a resumption of stability in Yemen.

Somalia's government blamed the Saudi-led coalition for the killing of at least 42 Somali refugees off the Yemeni coast. Somali Prime Minister Hassan Ali Khaire called the attack on a boat carrying refugees "atrocious" and "appalling".

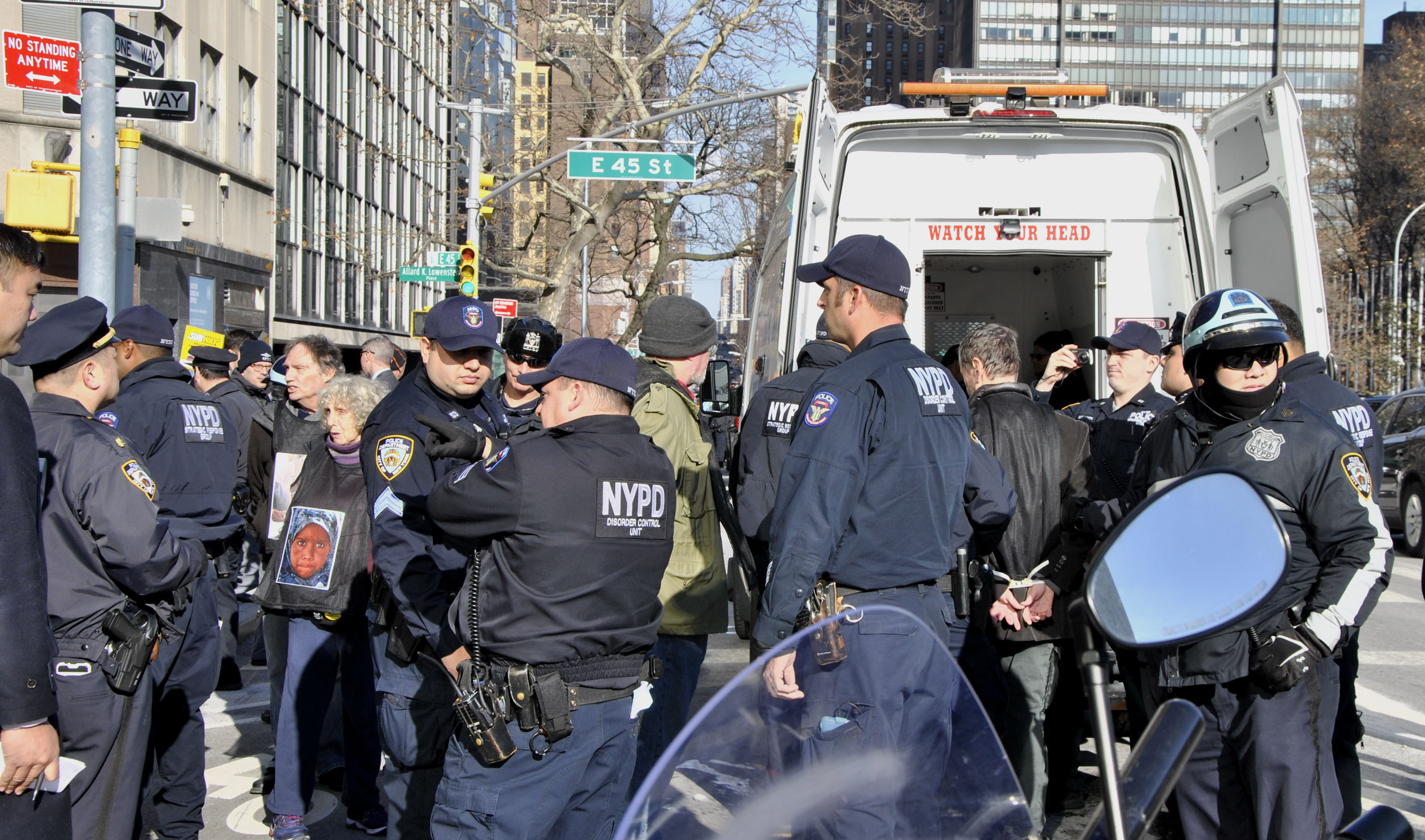
Protesters against the US-backed Saudi-led war on Yemen were led away and handcuffed by New York police outside the US mission to the UN on 11 December 2017.

Asian countries, including China, India, Malaysia and Pakistan, moved within days to evacuate their citizens from Yemen.

On 4 April, the ICRC called for a 24-hour humanitarian ceasefire after the coalition blocked three aid shipments to Yemen. Russia also called for "humanitarian pauses" in the coalition bombing campaign, bringing the idea before the United Nations Security Council in a 4 April emergency meeting. Saudi Arabia's UN ambassador raised questions over whether humanitarian pauses are the best way of delivering humanitarian assistance. On 7 April, China renewed calls for an immediate ceasefire.

On 10 April, the Pakistani Parliament declined a Saudi Arabian request to join the coalition. The Parliament clarified the wish to maintain a neutral diplomatic stance.

On 16 April, a group of U.S. and UK-based Yemen scholars wrote an open letter stating that the operation was illegal under international law and calling for the UN to enforce an immediate ceasefire.

On 19 April, international aid agency Oxfam condemned Saudi Arabia over airstrikes it said hit one of its warehouses containing humanitarian supplies in Saada.

Aid groups came out against the air campaign: Amnesty International said some of the coalition's airstrikes "appear to have failed to take necessary precautions to minimize harm to civilians and damage to civilian objects". Reporters without Borders condemned a strike in Sanaa on 20 April that caused the deaths of four employees of Al-Yemen Al-Youm TV and injured ten others; it also condemned attacks on journalists by pro-Houthi forces.

On 4 May, the UN called on the coalition to stop attacking Sanaa Airport to allow delivery of humanitarian aid. On 10 May the UN Humanitarian Coordinator for Yemen stated that the attacks on Saada province were in breach of international law. On 29 June, Secretary General Ban Ki-moon denounced a coalition airstrike that had hit a UN compound in Aden the previous day and requested a full investigation.

Human Rights Watch criticized the UN Security Council repeatedly for "remaining almost silent on coalition abuses". In January 2016, an unpublished United Nations panel investigating the Saudi-led bombing campaign in Yemen uncovered "widespread and systematic" attacks on civilian targets in violation of international humanitarian law, calling UN Security Council up for an international commission of inquiry. Saudi Arabia had previously objected to an inquiry being set up, and had not been supported by Western governments.

In February 2016, the Secretary-General of the UN Ban Ki-moon raised strong concerns over continued Saudi-led airstrikes, saying, "coalition air strikes in particular continue to strike hospitals, schools, mosques and civilian infrastructures" in Yemen. He urged States that are signatories to the Arms Trade Treaty to "control arms flows to actors that may use them in ways that breach of international humanitarian law".

In June 2016, Ban removed the Saudi-led coalition from a list of children's rights violators, saying that Saudi Arabia threatened to cut Palestinian aid and funds to other UN programs if the coalition was not removed from the blacklist for killing children in Yemen. According to one source, there was also a threat of "clerics in Riyadh meeting to issue a fatwa against the UN, declaring it anti-Muslim, which would mean no contacts of OIC members, no relations, contributions, support, to any UN projects, programs".

In September 2016, British Foreign Secretary Boris Johnson was accused of blocking the UN inquiry into Saudi war crimes in Yemen.

In April 2018, French President Emmanuel Macron voiced support for the Saudi Arabian–led intervention in Yemen and defended France's arms sales to the Saudi-led coalition. France authorised $18 billion (€16 billion) in arms sales to Saudi Arabia in 2015.

Bahri Abha – the Saudi Arabian ship arrived on 10 December 2019, at the Sagunto, Valencia port, where they were faced by Spanish Control Arms campaign organizations. Since the beginning of the Yemen war, the same ship has reportedly ferried $162 million worth of U.S.-made arms to the kingdom. Organizations such as Amnesty International, FundiPau, Greenpeace and Oxfam Intermón have objected to the shipment of arms from the Spanish port.

On June 15, 2020, UN Secretary-General António Guterres removed the Saudi-led coalition from a list of children's rights violators despite continued grave violations against children in Yemen.

On 12 November 2021, in opposition to Saudi Arabia's offensive operations in the Yemen civil war, Rep. Ilhan Omar introduced a joint resolution to block the sale of $650 million US weapons to the Kingdom. The weapons sale was authorized by the Biden administration and was expected to include 280 missiles, 596 LAU-128 Missile Rail Launchers, and other equipment. Omar said in a statement, "It is simply unconscionable to sell weapons to Saudi Arabia while they continue to slaughter innocent people and starve millions in Yemen, kill and torture dissidents, and support modern-day slavery."

On 28 December 2021, The Special Envoy of the Secretary-General for Yemen, Hans Grundberg, raised an alarm about the safety of civilians in the war-torn Yemen given the escalating violence, including airstrikes carried out by the Saudi-led coalition. According to his statement, airstrikes on Sanaa resulted in loss of civilian lives, and damage to the country's infrastructure. He also underlined that violations of international humanitarian and human rights law cannot continue with impunity.

On 29 July 2022, the United Nations Committee Against Torture issued its findings on the United Arab Emirates after review of the States party. In the session, the committee expressed concerns regarding the country's inhuman practices despite compliance of the Convention against Torture and Other Cruel, Inhuman or Degrading Treatment or Punishment. In its finding, the committee issued concerns about allegations of torture and maltreatment against the UAE-led armed forces, related non-state armed groups, and state security agencies in the Yemen war and fight against terrorism. The committee announced a special onus on the probe and prosecution of the allegations of offenses concerning torture and ill-treatment in the said situations and demanded for a viable pathway to be introduced for the victims in order for them to seek redress, justice and rehabilitation.

On 29 January 2021, Italy blocked arms sales to Saudi Arabia and the UAE, which ranked as biggest arms importers of Italian weapons. Then-Prime Minister Matteo Renzi cited the humanitarian crisis in Yemen in which the UAE and Saudi-led coalition was involved. Renzi had previously agreed to sales of approximately 20,000 missiles worth 400 million euros. However, Italy lifted the embargo on arms sales to the UAE, on 17 April 2023. A month after, Italy also lifted the embargo on arms sales to Saudi Arabia, on 31 May 2023.

== Al-Qaeda and Islamic State ==
Both al-Qaeda in the Arabian Peninsula (AQAP) and the Islamic State had a presence in Yemen before the Saudi-led intervention. AQAP had controlled substantial pieces of territory for some time, while the Islamic State claimed responsibility for twin bombings in Sanaa the following month which killed 140 people and injured hundreds more.

The two groups have used the conflict to expand and consolidate, a fact accepted by the Pentagon. The Houthis disengaged fighting AQAP to face rival Yemeni militias at the same time as they were being hit by coalition air strikes; A source indicates that Yemeni troops in the south remained in their bases instead of confronting al-Qaeda militants, fearing Saudi airstrikes on any troop movements. There are questions about the ability of the country to confront its Islamist militancy problem due to the major infrastructure damage caused by the war.

Within weeks of the commencement of the Yemen's civil war, AQAP had exploited the chaos to capture the south-eastern port city of Mukalla, along with nearby military, transport, and economic infrastructure. A series of prison breaks by al-Qaeda—they emptied Mukalla's jail of 300 prisoners and emptied 1,200 inmates in June 2015 from the central prison in Taiz—released jailed jihadists of all ranks. Reports indicate that Yemen's prisons had, in preceding years, reportedly become "de facto jihadi academies", as veteran militants were placed in cells alongside young, regular criminals.

The coalition campaign against the Houthis in Aden in July 2015 and subsequent chaos increased AQAP and the Islamic State's presence in the city. Residents of Aden faced a wave of bombings and shootings that prevented efforts at stabilization. AQAP conducted assassinations of judges, security officials, and police.

On 26 August 2015, Bob Semple, a British petroleum engineer who was kidnapped and held as a hostage by Al Qaeda in Yemen, was freed by the UAE armed forces after 18 months of captivity.

At the start of February 2016, AQAP recaptured Azzan, an important commercial city in Shabwa province. A few weeks later, al-Qaeda fighters and Saudi-led coalition forces were seen fighting a common target; the Houthis. But the situation is different in Aden, the AQAP/ISIS and pro-Hadi that were fighting a common enemy in Taiz are enemies in Aden. On 29 February 2016, a suicide car killed 4 pro-Hadi troops in Shiek Othman district in Aden, the city that Hadi uses as a temporary capital.

In collaboration with the United States, the United Arab Emirates has had a leading role in the fight against AQAP and the Islamic State's presence in Yemen. In April 2016, UAE armed forces assisted Yemeni forces in retaking the city of Mukalla from AQAP during the Battle of Mukalla. In August 2017, the UAE armed forces assisted a Yemeni army offensive against AQAP in Shabwah Governorate.

In an op-ed in The Washington Post Yousef Al Otaiba, the UAE ambassador to the United States, described that the intervention has reduced AQAP presence in Yemen to its weakest point since 2012 with many areas previously under their control liberated. The ambassador declared that more than 2,000 militants have been removed from the battlefield, with their controlled areas now having improved security and a better delivered humanitarian and development assistance such as to the port city of Mukalla and other liberated areas. An Associated Press investigation outlined that the military coalition in Yemen actively reduced AQAP in Yemen without military intervention, instead by offering them deals and even actively recruiting them in the coalition because "they are considered as exceptional fighters". UAE Brigadier General Musallam Al Rashidi responded to the accusations by stating that Al Qaeda cannot be reasoned with and cited that multiple of his soldiers have been killed by them. The UAE military stated that accusations of allowing AQAP to leave with cash contradicts their primary objective of depriving AQAP of its financial strength. The notion of the coalition recruiting or paying AQAP has been thoroughly denied by the United States Pentagon with Colonel Robert Manning, spokesperson of the Pentagon, calling the news source "patently false". The governor of Hadramut Faraj al-Bahsani, dismissed the accusations that Al Qaeda has joined with the coalition rank, explaining that if they did there would be sleeper cells and that he would be "the first one to be killed". According to The Independent, AQAP activity on social media as well as the number of terror attacks conducted by them has decreased since the Emirati intervention.

In January 2019, CNN stated that Saudi Arabia and the UAE provided al-Qaeda linked groups in Yemen with US-made military equipment including vehicles.

On 25 June 2019, Saudi special forces announced that they captured the leader of the ISIL-YP, Abu Osama al-Muhajer, on the 3 June along with other members including the chief financial officer of the organization.

In April 2020, Yemeni journalist Salah Bin Laghbar revealed documents showing cooperation between Saudi-led coalition and al-Qaeda in Yemen; "An official document from the al-Humiqani tribe warns Saudi-led coalition against sending weapons to terrorist organizations through the Al-Rashad Party, Muslim Brotherhood and terrorist Abdul Rahman Abu al-Harith al-Humiqani, who is affiliated with Daesh."

== Other effects ==
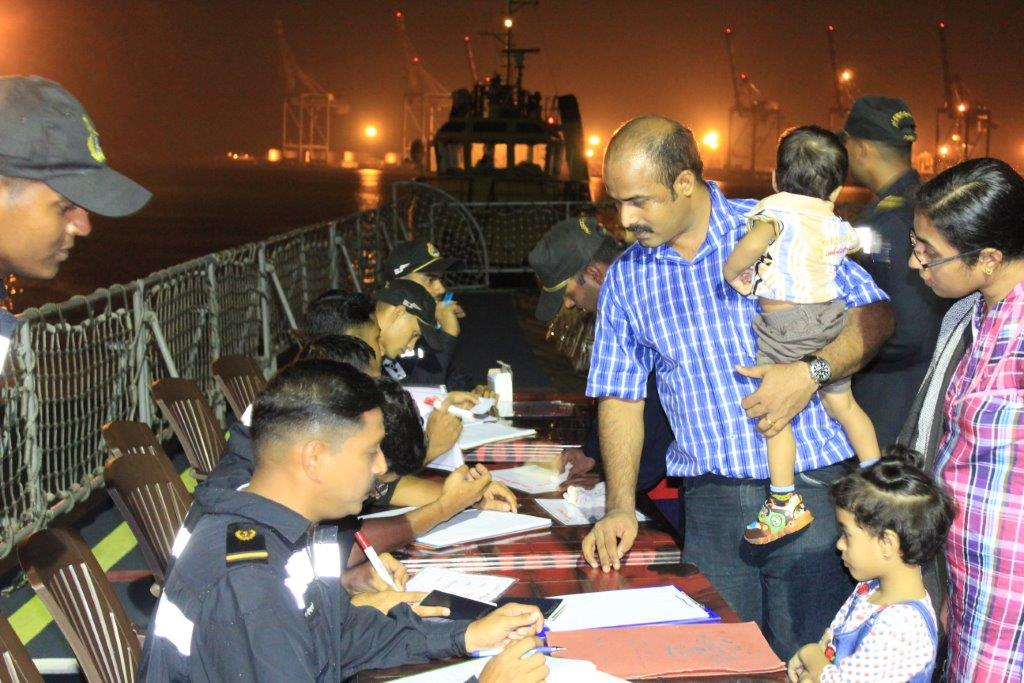
Registration of Indian citizens evacuating from Yemen, March 2015

On 25 March 2015, Gulf Air, the Bahraini flag carrier airline announced the immediate suspension of service to Sanaa. Somali airlines such as Daallo Airlines and Jubba Airways also encountered difficulties, as they were unable to fly over Yemen after its airspace became restricted. On 15 April 2015, Turkish Airlines suspended all Yemen flights until 1 June.

Following Hadi's request, the administration of the Egypt-based Nilesat and Saudi-based Arabsat, two satellite communication companies, stopped broadcasting Yemeni state-run television channels that had fallen under Houthi control. The channels included Al-Yemen, Al-Eman, Saba News Agency and Aden TV. Armed Houthis closed down the Sanaa offices of four media outlets, including Al Jazeera, Yemen Shabab and Suhail channels, as well as Al-Masdar's newspaper and website. Al-Saeeda channel was also stormed, but was allowed to remain open on the condition it not broadcast anti-Houthi material. Houthi Political Office member Mohammad Al-Bukhaiti said the channels were closed for supporting the coalition.

King Salman replaced his half-brother Muqrin as crown prince with Muhammad bin Nayef and named his son Mohammed bin Salman as defence minister, and then-Ambassador to the United States Adel al-Jubeir as foreign minister. Some reports linked the cabinet reshuffle to the war. At least one political analyst suggested that Muqrin was not supportive of the military intervention, and that this cost him his position. Prince Muqrin's Yemeni Lineage was pointed out as another possible cause.

The exiled Yemeni government sent a request to the UN, asking for foreign troops on the ground.

On 19 June 2015, WikiLeaks announced the intention of releasing over 500,000 Saudi diplomatic documents to the internet. In its statement, WikiLeaks referred to a recent electronic attack on the Saudi Foreign Ministry by a group calling itself the Yemen Cyber Army, but did not indicate whether they passed the documents to WikiLeaks.

The Sudanese Rapid Support Forces (RSF), which went on to gain international notoriety for committing genocide in Darfur during the Sudanese Civil War, participated in the intervention on a mercenary basis. They reportedly killed civilians and destroyed infrastructure during the operation, for which they were accused of war crimes by organisations such as Human Rights Watch. Importantly, the RSF also traces back its ongoing relations with the United Arab Emirates to the intervention in Yemen, which brought RSF leader Hemedti in contact with Emirati representatives.

== Peace efforts ==
=== Cease fire talks ===
On 15 May 2015, new UN envoy to Yemen Ismail Ould Cheikh Ahmed proposed peace talks in Geneva. Rebel spokesman Hamed al-Bokheiti said the Houthis were willing to hold talks in any "neutral" country. Five days later the Secretary-General of the United Nations, Ban Ki-moon announced that peace talks would be held in Geneva starting on 28 May and urged all parties to participate. Houthi rebels reiterated their support for the talks while exiled government officials said they would participate only if the Houthis withdrew from occupied cities.

On 26 May, Ban announced that the peace talks were to be postponed indefinitely after exiled Yemeni officials refused to attend until rebels withdrew from all occupied cities. On 6 June the UN announced that peace talks would take place on 14 June Both the exiled officials and the Houthi group confirmed their attendance.

=== 15–19 June 2015 talks ===
Secretary-General Ban called for a "humanitarian pause" during the Muslim holy month of Ramadan. Peace talks between the exiled government and the Houthis concluded in Geneva without reaching a ceasefire.

=== Ramadan peace agreement ===
On 4 July 2015, Houthi spokesman Mohammed Abdul Salam said in a post on his Facebook page that he had met Ahmed on Friday to discuss a Ramadan truce. The US and EU announced their support for a humanitarian truce.

On 9 July, the UN announced an unconditional truce between 10 July until the end of Eid ul Fitr on 17 July. The Special Envoy to Yemen assured the agreement of all warring factions. The truce was interrupted within an hour by airstrikes. Coalition spokesman later added that the coalition was not bound by the truce and that any truce would be counterproductive. It later added that it was not requested to pause by the exiled Yemeni Government.

=== Further peace talks ===
On 8 September 2015, Vice News revealed a leaked email by UN Envoy to Yemen Ismail Ould Cheikh Ahmed. In it, the envoy confirms that Houthi rebels and the party of former president and Houthi ally Ali Abdullah Saleh have expressed willingness to accept—with some reservations—a UN Security Council resolution, approved in April. This demanded the rebels "withdraw their forces from all areas they have seized, including the capital, Sanaa". "AA/GPC agreed to a new wording on UNSC resolution 2216 that states unequivocally that they are committed to the implementation of 2216 (see document attached) with the exception of article which infringe on Yemeni sovereignty and those related to sanctions," wrote Ould Cheikh Ahmed, referring to Ansar Allah (AA)—another name for the Houthis—and Saleh's General People's Congress party (GPC). "In addition, the new text includes acceptance of the return of the current government for a period of 60 days during which a government of national unity shall be formed," wrote the envoy in the email. According to Ould Cheikh Ahmed, during talks, the Houthis gave ground on certain language, including "mandatory support by the international community for reconstruction that was in the earlier version". "The latter was particularly opposed by KSA Kingdom of Saudi Arabia and GCC [Gulf Cooperation Council] who did not want it to be interpreted as a form of mandatory compensation", added the UN envoy.

On 10 September, the UN Envoy to Yemen announced that all parties had agreed to peace talks. A statement from Hadi's office following a meeting on the issue of new talks affirmed the president's "complete support for the sincere efforts exerted by the special envoy". It urged Ahmed to "exert efforts to achieve the public and honest commitment on the part of the Houthis and Saleh" to implement 14 April council resolution unconditionally. On 13 September, the exiled Yemeni government announced that it would no longer participate in the peace talks.

=== 2016 talks ===
On 18 April, peace talks aimed at ending Yemen's civil war that were set to begin faltered before they could start, when delegates representing Yemen's Houthi rebels refused to attend.

On 20 April, talks convened, based on UN Security Council resolution 2216 which called for the Houthi fighters to withdraw from areas they seized since 2014 and hand heavy weapons back to the government.

On 6 August, the UN special envoy to Yemen, Ismail Ould Cheikh Ahmed, announced the suspension in Kuwait, where the talks were being held. He said that the negotiations were not a failure and that they would resume in a month at an undisclosed location. Mr. Ahmed is the second United Nations envoy to try to broker peace talks between the Houthis and other factions in Yemen since March 2015. His predecessor quit after similar peace talk efforts failed. After the breakdown of the talks, one of the Houthi negotiators, Nasser Bagazgooz, blamed the United Nations envoy for seeking what he said amounted to a military solution on behalf of the Saudi-led coalition. Previous negotiations floated the idea of forming a unity government—composed of Houthi and former Hadi government leaders. But the exiled Hadi leaders have consistently rejected any deal that would diminish their power over Yemen, and the Houthis have said that they will reject any deal that does not give them a seat at the table.

November ceasefire

The Saudi-led military coalition and Houthis arrived at a swift ceasefire agreement effective 17 November 2016, as a result of efforts of US Secretary of State John Kerry and Omani dignitaries.

=== 2020 ceasefire in response to the COVID-19 pandemic ===
After the United Nations urged both sides to pursue peace talks in order to respond to the COVID-19 pandemic in Yemen, Saudi-led coalition spokesman Turki Al-Maliki announced a unilateral ceasefire beginning 9 April at noon, to support efforts to mitigate the COVID-19 pandemic. However, despite pledging ceasefire in Yemen, Saudi-led coalition carried out dozens of airstrikes in the span of a week. The Yemen Data Project stated that at least 106 Saudi-led airstrikes, across 26 raids in Yemen had been carried out by the Kingdom in just one week. On July 2, coalition fighter jets launched scores of airstrikes on several Yemeni provinces. The operation was a response to ballistic missile and drone launchings by the Houthis against Saudi Arabia. Both sides stepped up their attacks in September. On 10 January 2021, U.S. Secretary of State Mike Pompeo announced plans to designate Abdul Malik al-Houthi, Abd al-Khaliq Badr al-Din al-Houthi and Abdullah Yahya al Hakim as Specially Designated Global Terrorists. A month later, Antony J. Blinken revoked the designation of the trio as Specially Designated Global Terrorists. On January 2025, the second Trump administration re-designated the Houthis as a foreign terrorist organization.

== See also ==
- Outline of the Yemeni crisis, revolution, and civil war (2011–present)
- Timeline of the Yemeni crisis (2011–present)
- North Yemen civil war
- Famine in Yemen
- Iran–Saudi Arabia proxy conflict
- Qatar diplomatic crisis
- Battle of Sanaa (2017)
- Saudi Arabia and weapons of mass destruction
- List of modern conflicts in the Middle East
