= List of airlines of Somalia =

This is a list of airlines in Somalia.

| Airline | Image | Image or website | IATA | ICAO | Callsign | Commenced operations | Notes |
|---|---|---|---|---|---|---|---|
| Somali Airlines | | https://somaliairlines.so/ | HH | SOM | SOMALAIR | 1964 | |
| African Express Airways | | | XU | AXK | Express Jet | 1986 | |
| Daallo Airlines | | D3 | DAO | Daallo Airlines | 1991 | | |
| Jubba Airways | | 6J | JBW | Jubba | 1998 | | |
| Safe Air (Kenya) | | | K3 | SAQ | SINBAD | 2007 | |
| Freedom Airline | | | 4F | FDT | Freedom Eagle | 2008 | |
| Premier Airlines | | https://www.flypremierairline.com/en | | | | 2020 | |
| Aerojet Aviation Limited | | https://aerojetaviation.co.ke/ | | | | 2022 | |
| Salaam Air Express | | https://salamairexpress.com/ | | | | 2022 | |
| Maandeeq Air | | https://maandeeqair.com/ | | | | 2023 | |
| Halla Airlines | | https://hallaairlines.com/ | HA | | | 2024 | |
| Ocean Airlines | | | | | | 2025 | |
| Rayaan Air | | | | | | 2026 | |

== See also ==
- List of defunct airlines of Somalia
- Transport in Somalia
- List of airlines
