= Maandeeq Air =

Airline in Somalia

- Founded: 2015
- Commenced operations: 15 October 2015
- Hubs: Aden Adde International Airport
- Fleet size: 3
- Destinations: 23
- Headquarters: Mogadishu, Somalia
- Website: https://maandeeqair.com/

Maandeeq Air (Somali: shirkada Diyaaradaha Maandeeq) is a Somali-owned airline based at Aden Adde International Airport, Mogadishu, Somalia. The airline operates scheduled domestic flights within Somalia and international services to neighboring countries in the Horn of Africa, including Kenya.

== History ==
Maandeeq Air was established in 2015 by Somali entrepreneur Shueib Ali Warsame. The airline commenced operations on October 15, 2015, initially providing domestic flight services connecting various cities across Somalia.

In September 2024, Maandeeq Air expanded to include international flights, launching scheduled services between Mogadishu and Nairobi, Kenya.

As of 2025, Maandeeq Air operates a fleet including Fokker 50 and Fokker 70 aircraft.

== Fleet ==
As of June 2025, Maandeeq Air operates the following aircraft in its fleet:

Maandeeq Air
Aircraft	In Fleet	Order	Passengers	Notes
Fokker 50	2	—	58	
Fokker 70	1	—	85	
Total	3	—		
