= Salem Saleh bin Braik Cabinet =

Yemeni political entity

- Cabinet of Yemen
- Date formed: 3 May 2025
- Date dissolved: 15 January 2026

People and organisations
- Head of state: Rashad al-Alimi
- Head of government: Salem Saleh bin Braik

History
- Predecessor: Bin Mubarak Cabinet
- Successor: Shaya al-Zindani Cabinet

The Salem Saleh bin Braik Cabinet was an internationally recognised cabinet of Yemen. Salem Saleh bin Braik was appointed Prime Minister of Yemen on 3 May 2025.

In December 2025 Salem Saleh bin Braik left Aden for Riyadh, Saudi Arabia following an offensive by the Southern Transitional Council (STC) which saw it rapidly take control of most of the former South Yemen. By 22 December, several ministers and deputy-ministers in Salem Saleh bin Braik's cabinet had pledged support to the efforts of the STC to re-establish an independent state in South Yemen. Subsequently, four members of Yemen's Presidential Leadership Council resolved to suspend any public official who supported southern succession.

== Ministers ==
As of May 2025, members of the cabinet were as follows:

Office	Incumbent	Start	End
Prime Minister	Salem Saleh bin Braik	3 May 2025	Incumbent
Minister of Interior	Ibrahim Ali Ahmed Haidan	18 December 2020	Incumbent
Minister of Information	Muammar al-Iryani	18 September 2016	Incumbent
Minister of Foreign Affairs	Shaea Muhssin	16 March 2024	Incumbent
Minister of Defense	Mohsen al-Daeri	28 July 2022	Incumbent
Minister of Finance	Salem Saleh Bin Braik	19 September 2019	Incumbent
Minister of Justice	Badr al-Ardah	18 December 2020	Incumbent
Minister of Tourism	Muammar al-Iryani	18 December 2020	Incumbent
Minister of Electricity and Energy	Mana'a Saleh Yaslam	28 July 2022	Incumbent
Minister of Sana’a Secretariat	Abdelghani Jamil	18 September 2016	Incumbent
Minister of Youth and Sport	Nayef al-Bakri	15 September 2015	Incumbent
Minister of Civil Service and Insurance	Abdel Nasser Al-Wali	18 December 2020	Incumbent
Minister of Parliamentary Affairs and the Shura Council	Mohammed Moqbel al-Himyari	25 December 2017	Incumbent
Minister of Health	Qassem Mohammad Qassem Bahaibah	18 December 2020	Incumbent
Minister of Higher Education and Scientific Research	Khaled Al-Wesabi	18 December 2020	Incumbent
Minister of Public Works and Highways	Salem Mohamed al-Harayzi	28 July 2022	Incumbent
Minister of Social Affairs and Labour	Muhammad Al-Zaouri	18 December 2020	Incumbent
Minister of Oil and Minerals	Saeed Sulaiman al-Shamasi	28 July 2022	Incumbent
Minister of Religious Endowments and Guidance	Mohamed Ahmed Shabiba	18 December 2020	Incumbent
Minister of Agriculture and Irrigation	Salem Abdullah Issa Al-Soqotri	18 December 2020	Incumbent
Minister of Technical Education and Vocational	Khaled Al-Wesabi	18 December 2020	Incumbent
Minister of Culture	Muammar al-Iryani	18 December 2020	Incumbent
Minister of Transport	Abdel Salam Hamid	18 December 2020	Incumbent
Minister of Human Rights	Ahmed Mohamed Omar Orman	27 April 2017	Incumbent
Minister of Legal Affairs	Ahmed Mohamed Omar Orman	18 December 2020	Incumbent
Minister of Local Administration	Hussein Abdul Rahman	18 December 2020	Incumbent
Minister of Fisheries Wealth	Salem Abdullah Issa Al-Soqotri	18 December 2020	Incumbent
Minister of Planning and International Cooperation	Waed Abdullah Badhib	18 December 2020	Incumbent
Minister of Telecommunications and Information Technology	Waed Abdullah Badhib (acting)	12 December 2023	Incumbent
Minister of Industry and Trade	Mohamed al-Ashwal	18 December 2020	Incumbent
Minister of Water and Environment	Tawfiq al-Sharjabi	18 December 2020	Incumbent
Minister of Education	Tareq Salem al-Abkari	18 December 2020	Incumbent
