= Jamal al-Sallal =

Yemeni diplomat (born 1960)

- جمال السلال

Ambassador of Yemen to Canada
- Incumbent
- Assumed office 12 October 2016
- President: Abdrabbuh Mansour Hadi; Rashad al-Alimi
- Preceded by: Khaled Bahah

Minister of Foreign Affairs of Yemen
- In office 11 June 2014 – 9 November 2014
- President: Abdrabbuh Mansour Hadi
- Preceded by: Abu Bakr al-Qirbi
- Succeeded by: Abdullah al-Saidi

Permanent Representative of Yemen to the United Nations
- In office 8 April 2011 – 11 June 2014
- President: Ali Abdullah Saleh; Abdrabbuh Mansour Hadi
- Preceded by: Abdullah al-Saidi
- Succeeded by: Khaled al-Yamani

Ambassador of Yemen to Iran
- In office c. 2006 – 8 April 2011
- Preceded by: Abdul Qawi al-Iryani
- Succeeded by: None

Personal details
- Born: January 1, 1960 (age 66) Sanaa, North Yemen
- Party: General People's Congress
- Children: 3
- Parent: Abdullah al-Sallal (father)
- Education: Ain Shams University (BS); Johns Hopkins University (MA)

Jamal Abdullah al-Sallal (Note: Arabic: جمال عبد الله السلال) (born 1 January 1960) is a Yemeni diplomat who has served as the ambassador of Yemen to Canada since 2016. A son of former North Yemen ruler Abdullah al-Sallal, he is a career diplomat with the Ministry of Foreign Affairs, having served as Yemen's ambassador to Iran and non-resident ambassador to Azerbaijan from 2006 to 2011, the permanent representative to the United Nations from 2011 to 2014, and the foreign minister in 2014 among other roles.

== Early life and education ==
Sallal was born on 1 January 1960 in Sanaa, North Yemen. He is the youngest son of Abdullah al-Sallal, a military officer who led the 26 September Revolution which toppled the ruling monarchy and subsequently served as the first president of the Yemen Arab Republic until he was deposed in a 1967 coup, whereupon he fled to Egypt. In Cairo, Sallal graduated from al-Tarabi Secondary School in 1978, and received a Bachelor of Science in Commerce and Economics from Ain Shams University in 1982. He then attended Johns Hopkins University in the United States, from which he graduated in 1990 with a Master of Arts in International Public Policy.

== Career ==
Sallal is a member of the General People's Congress but was described as being "known for his independence from party affiliation" by Asharq Al-Awsat. He progressed through many roles in the Ministry of Foreign Affairs, first being posted to the Yemeni embassy in Washington, D.C., from 1986 to 1991, and being responsible for affairs with Canada. He was deputy permanent representative of Yemen's mission to the Arab League from 1994 to 1998, a member of the Arab world department of the foreign ministry from July 1998 to July 2000, director of the North America and Canada department from July 2000 to December 2002, and deputy chief of the Americas department and director of the North America and Canada department from December 2002 to June 2004.

He was the Consul General of the Yemeni consulate in Mumbai, India, in 2004, before serving as Consul General in the Emirate of Dubai and the Northern Emirates of the United Arab Emirates from 2005 to 2006. He then served as Yemen's ambassador to Iran and non-resident ambassador to Azerbaijan from 2006 to 2011. On 8 April 2011, Sallal was confirmed as the permanent representatives of Yemen to the United Nations. He served in this position until 11 June 2014, when he was appointed the minister of foreign affairs. He was characterized as "close" to President Abdrabbuh Mansour Hadi compared to his predecessor Abu Bakr al-Qirbi, who was appointed by former president Ali Abdullah Saleh. Political analyst Lutfi Noaman believed Sallal's priorities would be to expand cooperation with the Friends of Yemen states and to mend relations with Iran.

Abdullah al-Saidi would later be appointed the foreign minister on 9 November 2014. Sallal was sworn in as the Yemeni ambassador to Canada on 12 October 2016.

== Personal life ==
Sallal is married and has three children. He is fluent in Arabic and English. His older brother, Ali, is a former military officer and diplomat and a member of the Shura Council as of 2014.
