= List of foreign ministers in 2014 =

This is a list of foreign ministers in 2014.

== Africa ==
- Algeria - Ramtane Lamamra (2013–2017)
- Angola - Georges Rebelo Chicoti (2010–2017)
- Benin - Nassirou Bako Arifari (2011–2015)
- Botswana -
  1. Phandu Skelemani (2008–2014)
  2. Pelonomi Venson-Moitoi (2014–2018)
- Burkina Faso -
  1. Djibril Bassolé (2011–2014)
  2. Michel Kafando (2014–2015)
- Burundi - Laurent Kavakure (2011–2015)
- Cameroon - Pierre Moukoko Mbonjo (2011–2015)
- Cape Verde
  1. Jorge Borges (2011–2014)
  2. Jorge Tolentino (2014–2016)
- Central African Republic -
  1. Léonie Banga-Bothy (2013–2014)
  2. Toussaint Kongo Doudou (2014–2015)
- Chad - Moussa Faki (2008–2017)
- Comoros - El-Anrif Said Hassane (2013–2015)
- Republic of Congo - Basile Ikouébé (2007–2015)
- Democratic Republic of Congo - Raymond Tshibanda (2012–2016)
- Côte d'Ivoire - Charles Koffi Diby (2012–2016)
- Djibouti - Mahamoud Ali Youssouf (2005–present)
- Egypt
  1. Nabil Fahmi (2013–2014)
  2. Sameh Shoukry (2014–present)
- Equatorial Guinea - Agapito Mba Mokuy (2012–2018)
- Eritrea - Osman Saleh Mohammed (2007–present)
- Ethiopia - Tedros Adhanom (2012–2016)
- Gabon - Emmanuel Issoze-Ngondet (2012–2016)
- The Gambia
  1. Aboubacar Senghore (2013–2014)
  2. Mamour Alieu Jagne (2014)
  3. Bala Garba Jahumpa (2014–2015)
- Ghana - Hanna Tetteh (2013–2017)
- Guinea - François Lonseny Fall (2012–2016)
- Guinea-Bissau
  1. Fernando Delfim da Silva (2013–2014)
  2. Mário Lopes da Rosa (2014–2015)
- Kenya - Amina Mohamed (2013–2018)
- Lesotho - Mohlabi Tsekoa (2007–2015)
- Liberia - Augustine Kpehe Ngafuan (2012–2015)
- Libya - disputed
    1. Mohammed Abdelaziz (2012–2014)
    2. Mohammed al-Dairi (2014–2019) or
  - Mohamed al-Ghariani (2014–2015)
- Madagascar
  1. Ulrich Andriantiana (acting) (2013–2014)
  2. Arisoa Razafitrimo (2014–2015)
- Malawi -
  1. Ephraim Chiume (2012–2014)
  2. George Chaponda (2014–2016)
- Mali
  1. Zahabi Ould Sidi Mohamed (2013–2014)
  2. Abdoulaye Diop (2014–2017)
- Mauritania - Ahmed Ould Teguedi (2013–2015)
- Mauritius -
  1. Arvin Boolell (2008–2014)
  2. Étienne Sinatambou (2014–2016)
- Morocco - Salaheddine Mezouar (2013–2017)
  - Western Sahara - Mohamed Salem Ould Salek (1998–2023)
- Mozambique - Oldemiro Balói (2008–2017)
- Namibia - Netumbo Nandi-Ndaitwah (2012–present)
- Niger - Mohamed Bazoum (2011–2015)
- Nigeria
  1. Viola Onwuliri (acting) (2013–2014)
  2. Aminu Wali (2014–2015)
- Rwanda - Louise Mushikiwabo (2009–2018)
- São Tomé and Príncipe
  1. Natália Pedro da Costa Umbelina Neto (2012–2014)
  2. Manuel Salvador dos Ramos (2014–2016)
- Senegal - Mankeur Ndiaye (2012–2017)
- Seychelles - Jean-Paul Adam (2010–2015)
- Sierra Leone - Samura Kamara (2012–2017)
- Somalia
  1. Fowsiyo Yussuf Haji Aadan (2012–2014)
  2. Abdirahman Duale Beyle (2014–2015)
  - Somaliland - Mohamed Yonis (2013–2015)
  - Puntland
    1. Daud Mohamed Omar (2010–2014)
    2. Ali Ahmed Faatah (2014–present)
- South Africa - Maite Nkoana-Mashabane (2009–2018)
- South Sudan - Barnaba Marial Benjamin (2013–2016)
- Sudan - Ali Karti (2010–2015)
- Swaziland – Mgwagwa Gamedze (2013–2018)
- Tanzania – Bernard Membe (2007–2015)
- Togo - Robert Dussey (2013–present)
- Tunisia
  1. Othman Jerandi (2013–2014)
  2. Mongi Hamdi (2014–2015)
- Uganda - Sam Kutesa (2005–2021)
- Zambia
  1. Wilbur Simuusa (2013–2014)
  2. Harry Kalaba (2014–2018)
- Zimbabwe - Simbarashe Mumbengegwi (2005–2017)

== Asia ==
- Afghanistan
  1. Ahmad Moqbel Zarar (2013–2014)
  2. Atiqullah Atifmal (acting) (2014–2015)
- Armenia - Eduard Nalbandyan (2008–2018)
- Azerbaijan - Elmar Mammadyarov (2004–2020)
  - Nagorno-Karabakh - Karen Mirzoyan (2012–present)
- Bahrain - Sheikh Khalid ibn Ahmad Al Khalifah (2005–2020)
- Bangladesh -
  1. Abul Hassan Mahmud Ali (2013–2014)
  2. Sheikh Hasina (2014)
  3. Abul Hassan Mahmud Ali (2014–2019)
- Bhutan - Rinzin Dorji (2013–2015)
- Brunei - Pengiran Muda Mohamed Bolkiah (1984–2015)
- Cambodia - Hor Namhong (1998–2016)
- China - Wang Yi (2013–present)
- East Timor - José Luís Guterres (2012–2015)
- Georgia -
  1. Maia Panjikidze (2012–2014)
  2. Tamar Beruchashvili (2014–2015)
  - Abkhazia - Viacheslav Chirikba (2011–2016)
  - South Ossetia - David Sanakoyev (2012–2015)
- India
  1. Salman Khurshid (2012–2014)
  2. Sushma Swaraj (2014–2019)
- Indonesia
  1. Marty Natalegawa (2009–2014)
  2. Retno Marsudi (2014–present)
- Iran - Mohammad Javad Zarif (2013–2021)
- Iraq -
  1. Hoshyar Zebari (2003–2014)
  2. Hussain al-Shahristani (acting) (2014)
  3. Ibrahim al-Jaafari (2014–2018)
  - Kurdistan - Falah Mustafa Bakir (2006–2019)
- Israel - Avigdor Lieberman (2013–2015)
  - Palestinian Authority - Riyad al-Maliki (2007–present)
    - Gaza Strip (in rebellion against the Palestinian National Authority) - Ismail Haniyeh (acting) (2012–2014)
- Japan - Fumio Kishida (2012–2017)
- Jordan - Nasser Judeh (2009–2017)
- Kazakhstan – Erlan Idrissov (2012–2016)
- North Korea
  1. Pak Ui-chun (2007–2014)
  2. Ri Su-yong (2014–2016)
- South Korea - Yun Byung-se (2013–2017)
- Kuwait - Sheikh Sabah Al-Khalid Al-Sabah (2011–2019)
- Kyrgyzstan - Erlan Abdyldayev (2012–2018)
- Laos - Thongloun Sisoulith (2006–2016)
- Lebanon
  1. Adnan Mansour (2011–2014)
  2. Gebran Bassil (2014–2020)
- Malaysia - Anifah Aman (2009–2018)
- Maldives - Dunya Maumoon (2013–2016)
- Mongolia
  1. Luvsanvandan Bold (2012–2014)
  2. Lundeg Purevsuren (2014–2016)
- Myanmar - Wunna Maung Lwin (2011–2016)
- Nepal
  1. Madhav Prasad Ghimire (2013–2014)
  2. Mahendra Pandey (2014–2015)
- Oman - Yusuf bin Alawi bin Abdullah (1982–2020)
- Pakistan - Sartaj Aziz (2013–2017)
- Philippines - Albert del Rosario (2011–2016)
- Qatar - Khalid bin Mohammad Al Attiyah (2013–2016)
- Saudi Arabia - Prince Saud bin Faisal bin Abdulaziz Al Saud (1975–2015)
- Singapore - K. Shanmugam (2011–2015)
- Sri Lanka - G. L. Peiris (2010–2015)
- Syria - Walid Muallem (2006–2020)
- Taiwan - David Lin (2012–2016)
- Tajikistan - Sirodjidin Aslov (2013–present)
- Thailand -
  1. Surapong Tovichakchaikul (2011–2014)
  2. Phongthep Thepkanjana (acting) (2014)
  3. Thanasak Patimaprakorn (2014–2015)
- Turkey
  1. Ahmet Davutoğlu (2009–2014)
  2. Mevlüt Çavuşoğlu (2014–2015)
- Turkmenistan - Raşit Meredow (2001–present)
- United Arab Emirates - Sheikh Abdullah bin Zayed Al Nahyan (2006–present)
- Uzbekistan - Abdulaziz Komilov (2012–present)
- Vietnam - Phạm Bình Minh (2011–2021)
- Yemen -
  1. Abu Bakr al-Qirbi (2001–2014)
  2. Jamal Abdullah al-Sallal (2014)
  3. Abdullah al-Saidi (2014–2015)

== Europe ==
- Albania - Ditmir Bushati (2013–2019)
- Andorra - Gilbert Saboya Sunyé (2011–2017)
- Austria - Sebastian Kurz (2013–2017)
- Belarus - Vladimir Makei (2012–present)
- Belgium - Didier Reynders (2011–2019)
  - Brussels-Capital Region - Guy Vanhengel (2013–2019)
  - Flanders
    1. Kris Peeters (2008–2014)
    2. Geert Bourgeois (2014–2019)
  - Wallonia -
    1. Rudy Demotte (2009–2014)
    2. Paul Magnette (2014–2017)
- Bosnia and Herzegovina - Zlatko Lagumdžija (2012–2015)
- Bulgaria
  1. Kristian Vigenin (2013–2014)
  2. Daniel Mitov (2014–2017)
- Croatia - Vesna Pusić (2011–2016)
- Cyprus - Ioannis Kasoulidis (2013–2018)
  - Northern Cyprus - Özdil Nami (2013–2015)
- Czech Republic
  1. Jan Kohout (2013–2014)
  2. Lubomír Zaorálek (2014–2017)
- Denmark -
  1. Holger K. Nielsen (2013–2014)
  2. Martin Lidegaard (2014–2015)
  - Greenland
    1. Aleqa Hammond (2013–2014)
    2. Kim Kielsen (acting) (2014)
    3. Vittus Qujaukitsoq (2014–2017)
  - Faroe Islands - Kaj Leo Johannesen (2011–2015)
- Estonia
  1. Urmas Paet (2005–2014)
  2. Anne Sulling (acting) (2014)
  3. Keit Pentus-Rosimannus (2014–2015)
- Finland - Erkki Tuomioja (2011–2015)
- France - Laurent Fabius (2012–2016)
- Germany - Frank-Walter Steinmeier (2013–2017)
- Greece - Evangelos Venizelos (2013–2015)
- Hungary
  1. János Martonyi (2010–2014)
  2. Tibor Navracsics (2014)
  3. Péter Szijjártó (2014–present)
- Iceland - Gunnar Bragi Sveinsson (2013–2016)
- Ireland
  1. Eamon Gilmore (2011–2014)
  2. Charles Flanagan (2014–2017)
- Italy -
  1. Emma Bonino (2013–2014)
  2. Federica Mogherini (2014)
  3. Paolo Gentiloni (2014–2016)
- Latvia - Edgars Rinkēvičs (2011–2023)
- Liechtenstein - Aurelia Frick (2009–2019)
- Lithuania - Linas Antanas Linkevičius (2012–2020)
- Luxembourg - Jean Asselborn (2004–present)
- Republic of Macedonia - Nikola Poposki (2011–2017)
- Malta - George Vella (2013–2017)
- Moldova - Natalia Gherman (2013–2016)
  - Transnistria - Nina Shtanski (2012–2015)
  - Gagauzia - Svetlana Gradinari (2013–2015)
- Monaco - José Badia (2011–2015)
- Montenegro - Igor Lukšić (2012–2016)
- Netherlands -
  1. Frans Timmermans (2012–2014)
  2. Bert Koenders (2014–2017)
- Norway - Børge Brende (2013–2017)
- Poland
  1. Radosław Sikorski (2007–2014)
  2. Grzegorz Schetyna (2014–2015)
- Portugal - Rui Machete (2013–2015)
- Romania
  1. Titus Corlăţean (2012–2014)
  2. Teodor Meleșcanu (2014)
  3. Bogdan Aurescu (2014–2015)
- Russia - Sergey Lavrov (2004–present)
- San Marino - Pasquale Valentini (2012–2016)
- Serbia
  1. Ivan Mrkić (2012–2014)
  2. Ivica Dačić (2014–2020)
  - Kosovo
    1. Enver Hoxhaj (2011–2014)
    2. Hashim Thaçi (2014–2016)
- Slovakia - Miroslav Lajčák (2012–2020)
- Slovenia - Karl Erjavec (2012–2018)
- Spain - José Manuel García-Margallo (2011–2016)
  - Catalonia - Francesc Homs Molist (2012–2015)
- Sweden
  1. Carl Bildt (2006–2014)
  2. Margot Wallström (2014–2019)
- Switzerland - Didier Burkhalter (2012–2017)
- Ukraine
  1. Leonid Kozhara (2012–2014)
  2. Andriy Deshchytsia (acting) (2014)
  3. Pavlo Klimkin (2014–2019)
  - Donetsk People's Republic
    1. Ekaterina Gubareva (2014)
    2. Aleksandr Karaman (2014)
    3. Aleksandr Kofman (2014–2016)
  - Lugansk People's Republic - vacant (2014)
- United Kingdom -
  1. William Hague (2010–2014)
  2. Philip Hammond (2014–2016)
  - Scotland - Fiona Hyslop (2009–2020)
  - Jersey - Sir Philip Bailhache (2013–2018)
- Vatican City
  1. Archbishop Dominique Mamberti (2006–2014)
  2. Archbishop Paul Gallagher (2014–present)

== North America and the Caribbean ==
- Antigua and Barbuda
  1. Baldwin Spencer (2005–2014)
  2. Charles Fernandez (2014–2018)
- The Bahamas - Fred Mitchell (2012–2017)
- Barbados - Maxine McClean (2008–2018)
- Belize - Wilfred Elrington (2008–2020)
- Canada - John Baird (2011–2015)
  - Quebec
    1. Jean-François Lisée (2012–2014)
    2. Christine St-Pierre (2014–2018)
- Costa Rica
  1. Enrique Castillo (2011–2014)
  2. Manuel González Sanz (2014–2018)
- Cuba - Bruno Rodríguez Parrilla (2009–present)
- Dominica
  1. Roosevelt Skerrit (2010–2014)
  2. Francine Baron (2014–2019)
- Dominican Republic -
  1. Carlos Morales Troncoso (2004–2014)
  2. Andrés Navarro (2014–2016)
- El Salvador
  1. Jaime Miranda (2013–2014)
  2. Hugo Martínez (2014–2018)
- Grenada -
  1. Nickolas Steele (2013–2014)
  2. Clarice Modeste-Curwen (2014–2016)
- Guatemala
  1. Fernando Carrera (2013–2014)
  2. Carlos Raúl Morales (2014–2017)
- Haiti
  1. Pierre Richard Casimir (2012–2014)
  2. Duly Brutus (2014–2015)
- Honduras - Mireya Agüero (2013–2015)
- Jamaica - Arnold Nicholson (2012–2016)
- Mexico - José Antonio Meade Kuribreña (2012–2015)
- Nicaragua - Samuel Santos López (2007–2017)
- Panama -
  1. Fernando Núñez Fábrega (2013–2014)
  2. Francisco Álvarez De Soto (2014)
  3. Isabel Saint Malo (2014–2019)
- Puerto Rico – David Bernier (2013–2015)
- Saint Kitts and Nevis - Patrice Nisbett (2013–2015)
- Saint Lucia - Alva Baptiste (2011–2016)
- Saint Vincent and the Grenadines - Camillo Gonsalves (2013–2015)
- Trinidad and Tobago - Winston Dookeran (2012–2015)
- United States of America - John Kerry (2013–2017)

== Oceania ==
- Australia - Julie Bishop (2013–2018)
- Fiji - Ratu Inoke Kubuabola (2009–2016)
- French Polynesia -
  1. Gaston Flosse (2013–2014)
  2. Édouard Fritch (2014–present)
- Kiribati - Anote Tong (2003–2016)
- Marshall Islands
  1. Phillip H. Muller (2012–2014)
  2. Tony deBrum (2014–2016)
- Micronesia - Lorin S. Robert (2007–2019)
- Nauru - Baron Waqa (2013–2019)
- New Zealand - Murray McCully (2008–2017)
  - Cook Islands - Henry Puna (2013–2020)
  - Niue - Toke Talagi (2008–2020)
  - Tokelau
    1. Salesio Lui (2013–2014)
    2. Kuresa Nasau (2014–2015)
- Palau - Billy Kuartei (2013–2017)
- Papua New Guinea - Rimbink Pato (2012–2019)
- Samoa - Tuilaepa Aiono Sailele Malielegaoi (1998–2021)
- Solomon Islands
  1. Clay Forau Soalaoi (2012–2014)
  2. Milner Tozaka (2014–2019)
- Tonga -
  1. Sialeʻataongo Tuʻivakanō (2010–2014)
  2. ʻAkilisi Pōhiva (2014–2017)
- Tuvalu - Taukelina Finikaso (2013–2019)
- Vanuatu
  1. Edward Natapei (2013–2014)
  2. Sato Kilman (2014–2015)

== South America ==
- Argentina - Héctor Timerman (2010–2015)
- Bolivia - David Choquehuanca (2006–2017)
- Brazil - Luiz Alberto Figueiredo (2013–2015)
- Chile -
  1. Alfredo Moreno Charme (2010–2014)
  2. Heraldo Muñoz (2014–2018)
- Colombia - María Ángela Holguín (2010–2018)
- Ecuador - Ricardo Patiño (2010–2016)
- Guyana - Carolyn Rodrigues (2008–2015)
- Paraguay - Eladio Loizaga (2013–2018)
- Peru
  1. Eda Rivas (2013–2014)
  2. Gonzalo Gutiérrez Reinel (2014–2015)
- Suriname - Winston Lackin (2010–2015)
- Uruguay - Luis Almagro (2010–2015)
- Venezuela
  1. Elías Jaua (2013–2014)
  2. Rafael Ramírez (2014)
  3. Delcy Rodríguez (2014–2017)
