= Ministry of Foreign Affairs and Expatriates =

Ministry of Foreign Affairs and Expatriates may refer to:

- Ministry of Foreign Affairs and Expatriates (Jordan)
- Ministry of Foreign Affairs and Expatriates (Palestine)
- Ministry of Foreign Affairs and Expatriates (Syria)
- Ministry of Foreign Affairs and Expatriates (Yemen)
