= Riad Yassin =

Yemeni politician (born 1955)

Ambassador of Yemen to France
- Incumbent
- Assumed office 9 November 2016
- President: Abdrabbuh Mansur Hadi, Rashad al-Alimi

Minister of Foreign Affairs of Yemen
- In office 21 March 2015 – 1 December 2015
- President: Abdrabbuh Mansur Hadi
- Prime Minister: Khaled Bahah
- Preceded by: Abdullah al-Saidi
- Succeeded by: Abdulmalik Al-Mekhlafi

Minister of Health
- In office 9 November 2014 – 15 September 2015
- President: Abdrabbuh Mansur Hadi
- Prime Minister: Khaled Bahah
- Preceded by: Ahmad Qassim al-Ansi
- Succeeded by: Nasser Ba'aum

Personal details
- Born: Riyadh Yassin Abdullah; 20 June 1955 (age 70) Aden, Yemen

Riad Yassin Abdallah (Arabic: رياض ياسين عبدالله, a.k.a. Riyadh Yassin Abdullah; born 20 June 1955 in Aden) is a Yemeni politician and diplomat. He is the current Yemeni ambassador to France since 2016. Previously, he served as the Foreign Minister of Yemen between March and December 2015. Abdulmalik Al-Mekhlafi succeeds him.
