= Shaya al-Zindani =

Yemeni diplomat and statesman (born 1954)

Shaya Zindani
- شائع الزنداني
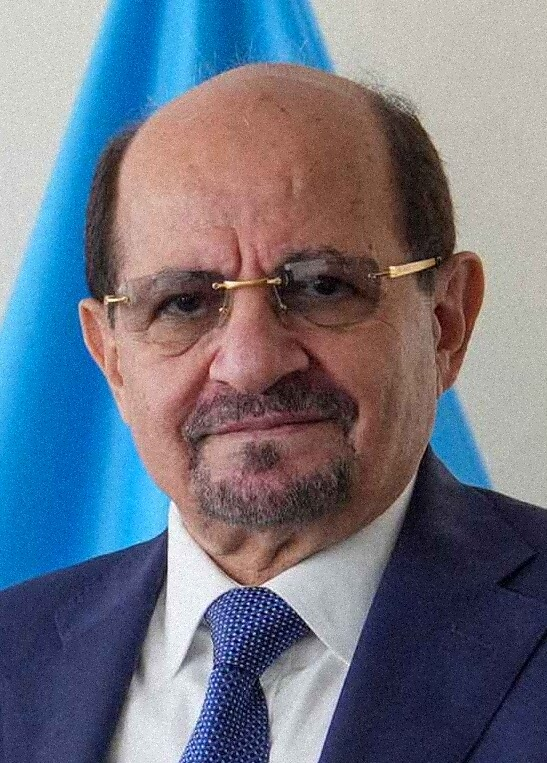
- Zindani in 2025

Prime Minister of Yemen
- Incumbent
- Assumed office 15 January 2026
- President: Rashad al-Alimi
- Preceded by: Salem Saleh bin Braik

Minister of Foreign Affairs and Expatriates
- In office 27 March 2024 – 23 July 2026
- President: Rashad al-Alimi
- Prime Minister: Ahmad Awad bin Mubarak; Salem Saleh bin Braik
- Preceded by: Ahmad Awad bin Mubarak
- Succeeded by: Afrah al-Zouba

Personal details
- Born: 16 September 1954 (age 72) Modern day Jahaf District, Dhale Governorate, Yemen
- Children: 4

Shaya Mohsen al-Zindani (Note: Arabic: شايع محسن الزنداني, romanized: Šāyiʿ Muḥsin az-Zindānī; also transliterated as Shaea and Shae'a, and Zandani) (born 16 September 1954) is a Yemeni diplomat and statesman who has served as the prime minister of Yemen since 2026. Zindani was the deputy foreign minister of South Yemen prior to unification and served numerous diplomatic posts afterwards, including the role of ambassador to the United Kingdom, Italy, Greece, Serbia, Albania, San Marino, Jordan and Saudi Arabia. He served as the minister of foreign affairs and expatriates from 2024 to 2026.

As foreign minister, he engaged in peace talks with the Houthis in an effort to end the civil war. After being appointed prime minister, he formed a new cabinet, which was praised for including three women.

== Early life and education ==
Zindani was born on 16 September 1954 in modern day Jahaf District of Dhale Governorate in southern Yemen. His family traces its lineage to the northern Arhab region of Sanaa. He attended the University of Aden and graduated with a bachelor's degree in law before studying abroad at the University of Oxford in the United Kingdom. He received a higher diploma in philosophy, and a doctorate in the philosophy of law, and later an honorary doctorate in Diplomatic Sciences. Zindani was noted for his student activism, serving as president of the General National Union of Yemeni Students in 1974, and the secretary-general of the General Union of Arab Students in 1976.

== Diplomatic career ==
After teaching at the University of Aden 1978 to 1981, Zindani joined the diplomatic corps of South Yemen. He was the minister plenipotentiary and chargé d'affaires at the embassy of South Yemen in Baghdad, Iraq, from 1981 to 1982, before serving as deputy foreign minister of South Yemen from 1986 to 1990. In this position, he was involved in talks with the Yemeni Arab Republic which led to the unification of Yemen in 1990, and headed the Yemeni delegation at a meeting between Arab diplomats on the day of the declaration of unity.

Zindani served as deputy foreign minister in the newly-formed Republic of Yemen from 1990 to 1991. From thereon, he served multiple international posts, including ambassador extraordinary and plenipotentiary to the UK from 1991 to 1994 and ambassador to Italy and non-resident ambassador to Greece, Serbia, Albania, and San Marino from 2005 to 2010. From 2010 to 2015, Zindani served as the ambassador to Jordan. Later on, Zindani served as the Yemeni consul in Saudi Arabia before being appointed ambassador to the country in 2016, as well as the permanent representative to the Organisation of Islamic Cooperation, serving in these roles until his appointment as foreign minister in 2024.

=== Minister of Foreign Affairs (2024–2026) ===
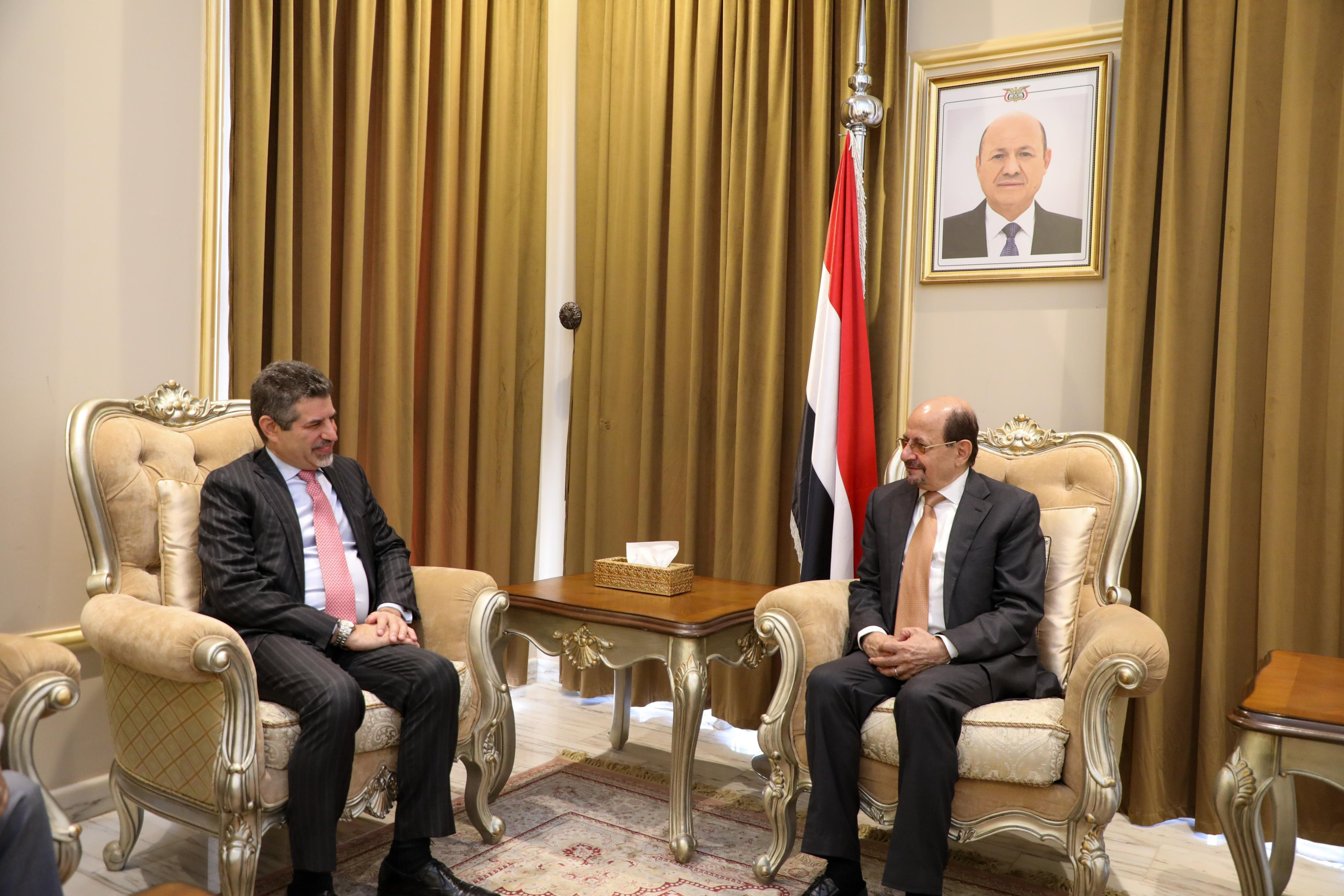
Zindani with United States ambassador Steven Fagin in September 2024

Since 2014, there has been a civil war in Yemen between the Houthis and the internationally recognized government, backed by a Saudi-led coalition. The internationally recognized government is represented by the Presidential Leadership Council (PLC), led by President Rashad al-Alimi. Zindani was appointed Minister of Foreign Affairs and Expatriates by al-Alimi on 27 March 2024 to succeed Ahmed Awad bin Mubarak, who was appointed prime minister. The selection of Zindani provoked internal objections from multiple members of the PLC as well as Bin Mubarak, who feared that Zindani would overhaul his previous diplomatic appointments. The Saudi government hosted a meeting in Riyadh with the PLC and Bin Mubarak in April reportedly to settle the disputes.

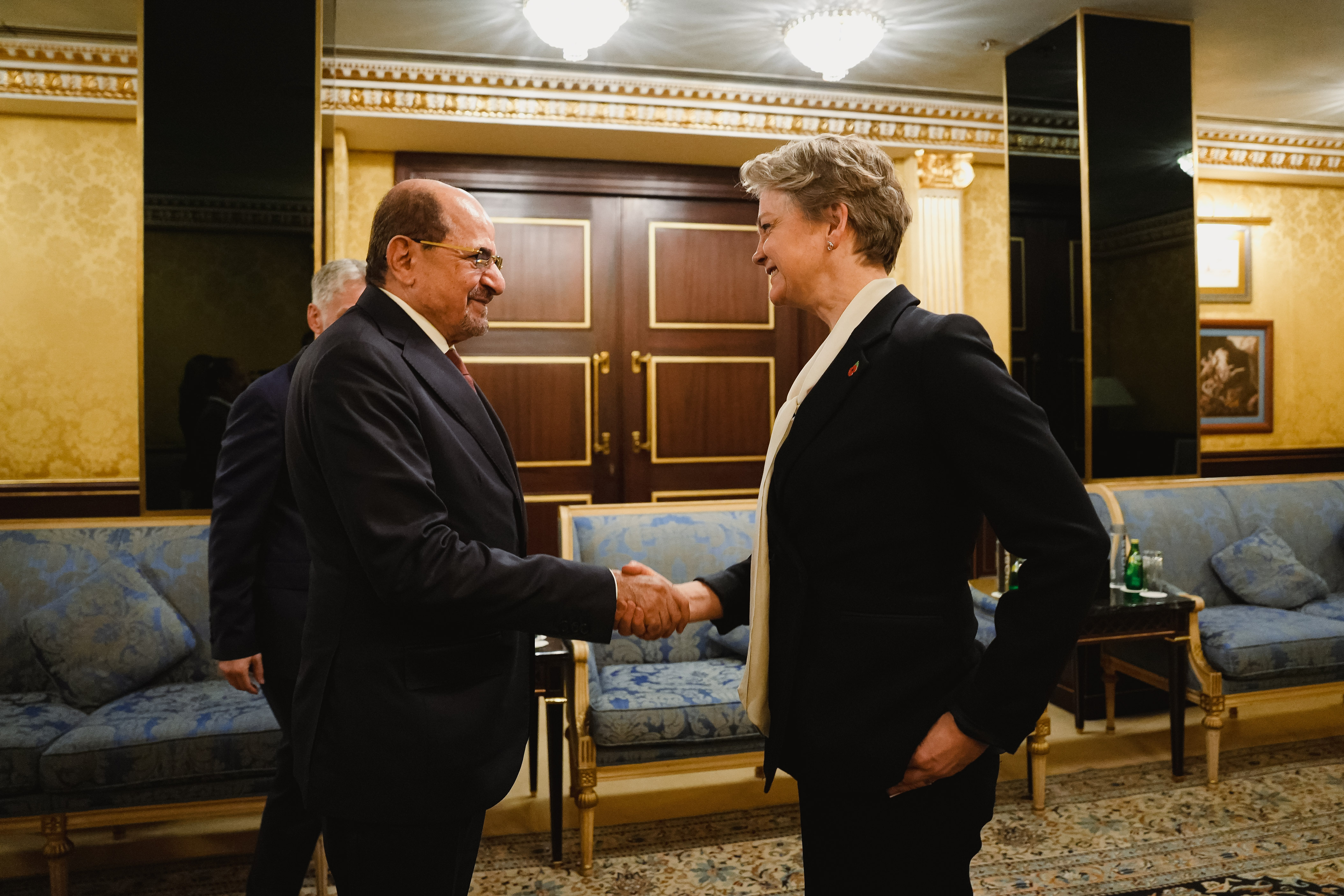
Zindani with British Foreign Secretary Yvette Cooper in November 2025

As foreign minister, Zindani sought to strengthen relations with numerous countries including Oman, Egypt, Kuwait, and Vietnam. In June 2024, Zindani held meetings with the foreign ministers of Egypt and Oman, in which their respective foreign ministers emphasized the importance of their countries' relations with Yemen. Likewise, with Kuwait and Vietnam, he signed agreements to increase trade and relations. In an interview broadcast by Al Hadath on 11 May 2024, he reported warming relations with Ba'athist Syria, which did not recognize the Houthis as the legitimate authority in Yemen. Upon the fall of the Assad regime, Zindani held his first call with his Syrian caretaker government counterpart Asaad al-Shaibani on 30 December, during which they agreed upon the revitalization of bilateral relations and the reopening of the Yemeni embassy, which had been closed since 2012.

Speaking to The National in a February 2025 interview, Zindani said that "we don't see an end to the war any time soon," and believed Iran would continue to support the Houthis despite the weakening of its proxy network. He said the foreign ministry was engaged in strengthening relations with regional neighbours and was being restructured to reduce corruption. He told Asharq Al-Awsat in August that peace negotiations were effectively frozen due to a lack of cooperation from the Houthis on the encouragement of Iran. He voiced support for the Hans Grundberg, the United Nations special envoy to Yemen, "despite his shortcomings in some areas," and urged greater international action to combat Iranian weapons shipments to the Houthis. He emphasized the government's positive relations with China and Saudi Arabia, stating of the latter that they "constantly aspire to coordinate our efforts on the international arena." Amidst a Saudi-backed Yemeni government offensive against the Southern Transitional Council (STC) in early January 2026, Zindani voiced support for the Saudi government's proposed conference between the different factions of southern Yemen.

== Premiership (2026–present) ==
The PLC appointed Zindani as prime minister on 15 January 2026 following the resignation of Salem Saleh bin Braik, and tasked him with forming a new cabinet. The move came amid turmoil within the government-controlled areas of the country following the collapse of the STC. Political researcher Abdulghani al-Iryani viewed the selection of Zindani, the first prime minister to be born in Dhale, as a means of retaining representation for the southern governorate following the flight of STC leader Aidarus al-Zoubaidi.

The new cabinet was announced on 6 February, with Zindani assuming the position of prime minister while also retaining his role as foreign minister. A total of 35 ministers were included in the cabinet, an increase of 10 members compared to the previous one. Its composition was noted for diversity in terms of professional background and regional and political representation, the latter interpreted by researcher Yaseen al-Tamimi as a return to an appeasement policy towards the different actors in the country. The inclusion of three female ministers was praised by local women's rights activists, while reception in the south was more mixed, with many southern separatists criticizing the new cabinet.

Zindani stated his government's objectives would be "improving living conditions and services, combating corruption," and bringing back territories from Houthi control. After being officially sworn in, Zindani said his first action would be to move the cabinet from Saudi Arabia to Aden. The cabinet held its first meeting in Aden on 19 February.

On 23 July 2026, Afrah al-Zouba was appointed foreign minister, ending al-Zindani's term in the position. al-Zouba was the first woman appointed in the role or any of the cabinet's top positions.

== Personal life ==
Zindani is married and has three daughters and a son. Besides Arabic, his native language, he speaks English.
