= Hisham Sharaf =

Yemeni politician

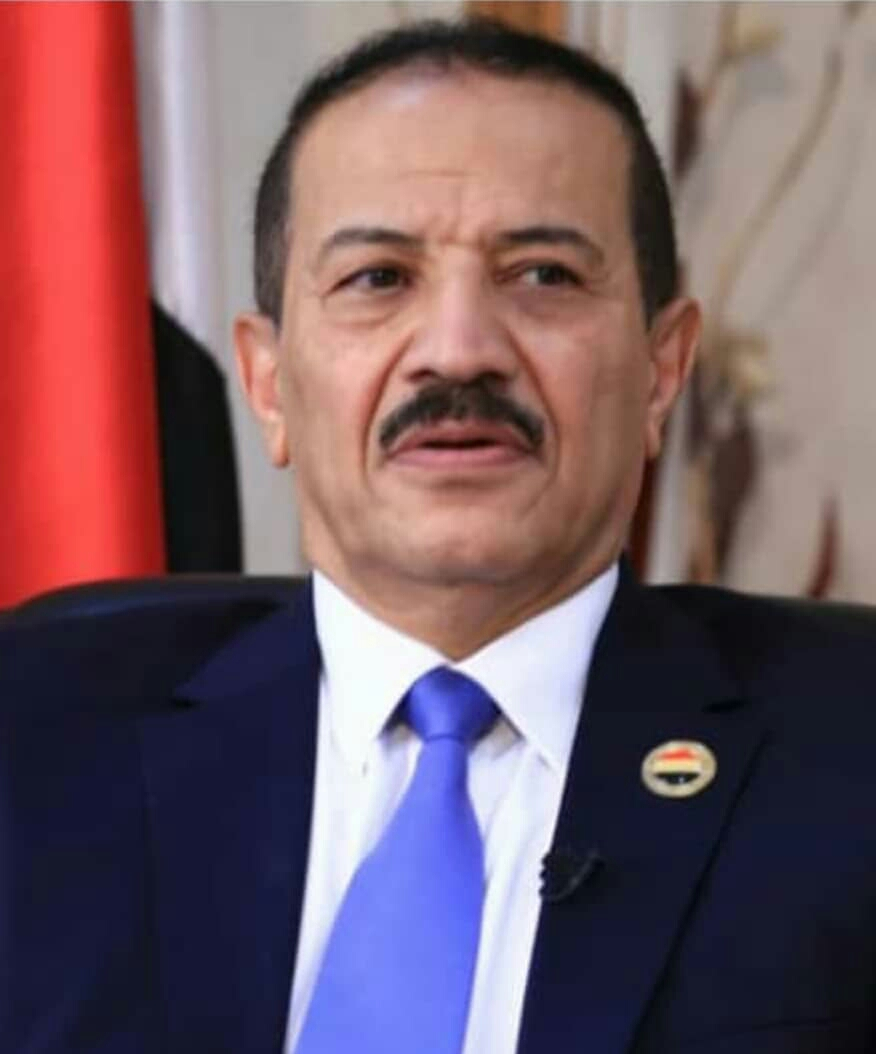

Minister of Foreign Affairs of Yemen Disputed
- In office 28 November 2016 – 12 August 2024
- President: Saleh Ali al-Sammad; Mahdi al-Mashat
- Prime Minister: Abdel-Aziz bin Habtour; Ahmed al-Rahawi
- Preceded by: Abu Bakr al-Qirbi
- Succeeded by: Jamal Amer

Minister of Higher Education and Scientific Research
- In office 12 September 2012 – 9 November 2014
- President: Abed Rabbo Mansour Hadi
- Prime Minister: Muhammad Salim Basindwah
- Preceded by: Yahia Al Shoaibi
- Succeeded by: Mohammad al-Mutahar

Personal details
- Born: 1956 (age 69–70) Taiz, Yemen
- Education: Pennsylvania State University; Catholic University of America
- *Sharaf's term has been disputed first by Abdulmalik Al-Mekhlafi and thereafter by Khaled al-Yamani.

Hisham Sharaf Abdullah (born 1956) is a Yemeni civil engineer and politician who has served in several cabinet posts. He was Yemen's minister of foreign affairs, and formerly the minister of higher education and scientific research.

== Early life and education ==
Abdullah was born in Taiz in 1956. He holds a civil engineering degree, which he received from Pennsylvania State University in 1983. He obtained a master's degree in project administration with a minor in computer science from the Catholic University of America in 1988.

== Career ==
Sharaf served as deputy minister for international planning and co-operation until early 2011. In January 2011, he was named the minister of industry and trade, replacing Yahya Al Mutawakil in the post. On 7 December 2011, Sharaf was appointed minister of oil and natural mineral resources in the unity government led by Prime Minister Muhammad Salim Basindwah. Saadeddin bin Taleb succeeded him as minister of industry and trade. On 11 September 2012, Sharaf was appointed minister of higher education and scientific research in a cabinet reshuffle, succeeding Yahia Al Shoaibi. His deputy Ahmed Abdullah Daress replaced Sharaf as oil minister.

== Arrest ==
On 9 July 2025, Sharaf was arrested by security at Aden International Airport, which is controlled by the internationally-recognized government of Yemen, after attempting to board a flight to Addis Ababa, the capital of Ethiopia. He was released from custody on 23 July and was allowed to leave Yemen to an unspecified country.

== Personal life ==
Sharaf is married and has three children.

== See also ==
- List of foreign ministers in 2017
- List of current foreign ministers

Political offices
Preceded by Abu Bakr al-Qirbi	Foreign Minister of Yemen; 2016-present	Incumbent
