= Mohammed Al-Hadhrami =

Yemeni politician (born 1979)

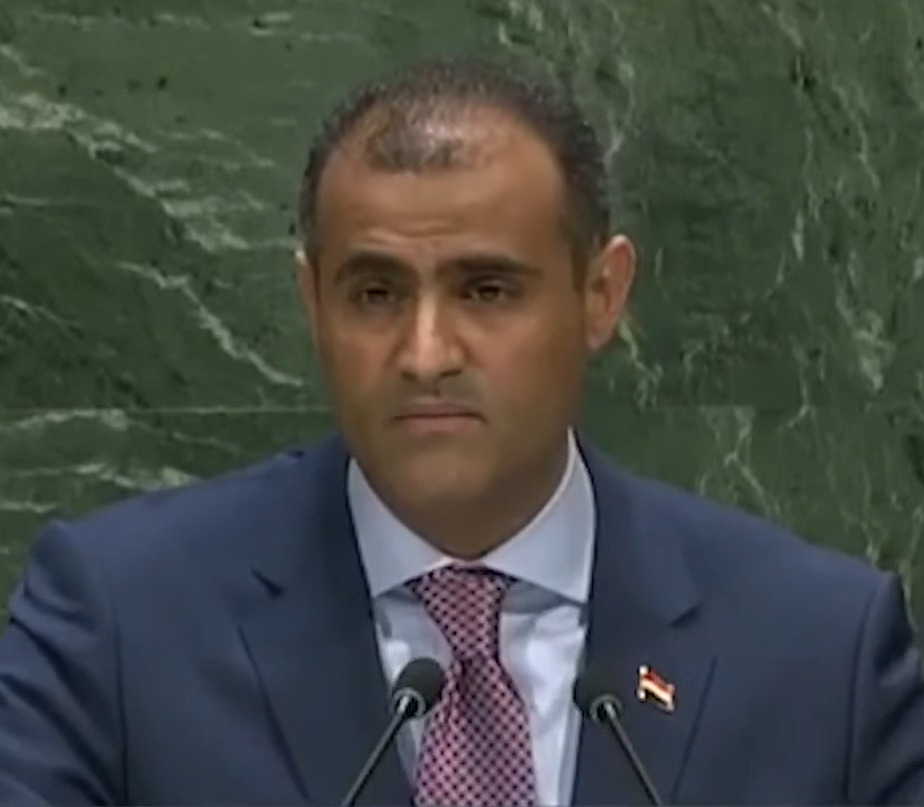

Ambassador of Yemen to the United States
- Incumbent
- Assumed office 24 March 2022
- President: Abdrabbuh Mansur Hadi Rashad al-Alimi
- Prime Minister: Maeen Abdulmalik Saeed
- Preceded by: Ahmad Awad bin Mubarak

Minister of Foreign Affairs of Yemen
- In office 10 June 2019 – 18 December 2020
- President: Abdrabbuh Mansur Hadi
- Prime Minister: Maeen Abdulmalik Saeed
- Vice President: Ali Mohsen Saleh
- Preceded by: Khaled al-Yamani
- Succeeded by: Ahmad Awad bin Mubarak

Personal details
- Born: 28 October 1979 (age 46) Sanaa, North Yemen

Mohammed Abdullah Al-Hadhrami (born 28 October 1979) is a Yemeni politician and diplomat. He is the current ambassador of Yemen to the United States. Previously, he served as minister of foreign affairs.

== Education ==
Al-Hadhrami holds a Master in Development Policy from the Korean Development Institute, which he gained in 2013, as well as a Master in Diplomacy and International Relations from Fairleigh Dickinson University. He also earned a bachelor's degree from Missouri State University in 2002.

== Career ==
Al-Hadhrami began his diplomatic career in 2004 and worked at the Yemen Permanent Mission to the United Nations from 2008 to 2012, representing Yemen at the UNDP, UNOPS, and UNFPA Executive Boards. He was deputy chief of mission at the Embassy of the Republic of Yemen in Washington, DC, from 2016 to 2018. In 2019, Al-Hadhrami was appointed the minister of the foreign affairs of Yemen after he served as vice minister of foreign affairs in 2018.
