= Salem Saleh bin Braik =

Yemeni politician (born 1965)

- سالم صالح بن بريك
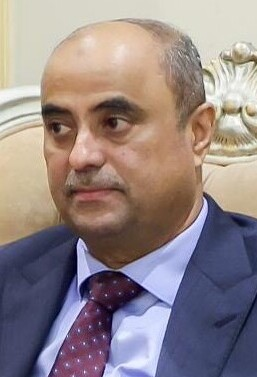
- Bin Braik in 2025

12th Prime Minister of Yemen
- Disputed (Note: Tenure as Prime Minister of Yemen disputed by Ahmed al-Rahawi (May–August 2025) and Muhammad Ahmed Miftah (August 2025–January 2026))
- In office 3 May 2025 – 15 January 2026
- President: Rashad al-Alimi
- Preceded by: Ahmad Awad bin Mubarak
- Succeeded by: Shaya al-Zindani

Personal details
- Born: Salem Saleh Salem bin Braik; 3 April 1965 (age 61) Mukalla, Qu'aiti Sultanate (modern-day Yemen)

Salem Saleh Salem bin Braik (Arabic: سالم صالح سالم بن بريك; born 3 April 1965) is a Yemeni politician who served as the internationally recognised prime minister of Yemen, under the Presidential Leadership Council (PLC), from 2025 to 2026.

== Early life ==
Salem Saleh Salem bin Braik was born on 3 April 1965 in Mukalla, a coastal city in eastern Yemen along the Gulf of Aden.

== Career ==
Before bin Braik was appointed Prime Minister, he held the position of Finance Minister. But following the resignation of Ahmad Awad bin Mubarak, who stepped down citing difficulties in executing his role, including being blocked from implementing a cabinet reshuffle. Mubarak's tenure was marked by clashes with Rashad al-Alimi, head of Yemen's presidential council, over the dismissal of several government ministers. Bin Braik's leadership came at a time when Yemen continued to grapple with a prolonged civil war, with the Houthi controlled rival government who control significant portions of the country, including the capital, Sanaa. The U.S. has intensified airstrikes against Houthi positions to deter their attacks on commercial shipping in the Red Sea. On 5 December 2025 Salem Saleh bin Braik left Aden for Riyadh, Saudi Arabia following an offensive by the Southern Transitional Council which saw it rapidly take control of most of the former South Yemen. He attended a meeting of Yemen's National Defence Council in Riyadh on 26 December 2025.

== See also ==
- Salem Saleh bin Braik Cabinet
