= Iran–Yemen relations =

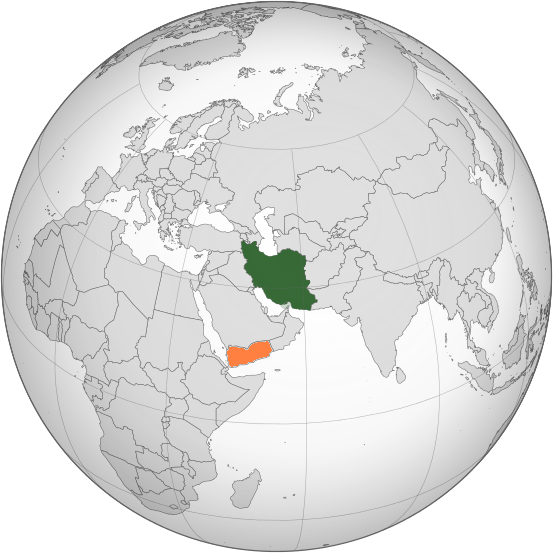

- Iran: Yemen

Diplomatic mission
- Embassy of Iran, Sanaa: Embassy of Yemen (SPC), Tehran

Ties between Iran and Yemen have largely been defined by the impact of the Iran–Saudi Arabia proxy conflict on the Yemeni political atmosphere. Since the Islamic Revolution in 1979, the Iranian government has been the strongest state supporter of Yemen's Houthis, which espouse Zaydi Shia Islam and comprise part of the Iran-led "Axis of Resistance" in the Middle East. In 2014, as part of the ongoing Yemeni crisis, the Houthis pushed Yemen's government out of power and have since controlled parts of Yemen surrounding the capital city of Sanaa and along the country's coast with the Red Sea; Iran recognized the Houthis' Supreme Political Council as the sole legitimate government of Yemen in 2019 and remains the only country to have an official diplomatic relationship with the movement. Iranian support for the Houthis has put the country at odds with the internationally recognized Yemeni government of the Aden-based Presidential Leadership Council, which has been backed by the Saudi Arabian intervention in the Yemeni civil war.

Among other countries, Saudi Arabia and the United States have repeatedly accused Iran of providing funding and weapons to Houthi militants in Yemen, and on one occasion claimed to have discovered Iranian-made weapons in seized Houthi caches. Alongside Iran itself, Iranian proxies in Lebanon and Syria, such as Hezbollah, have faced accusations of helping to prop up the Houthi government in Sanaa. On a number of occasions, the Iranian military has also deployed submarines and warships off of Yemen's coast along the Gulf of Aden and the Red Sea, ostensibly to conduct anti-piracy operations.

== History ==
=== Medieval and early modern era ===
South Arabia (mostly comprising Yemen) was a territory contested between the Sasanian Empire and the Ethiopia-based Kingdom of Aksum. Following the Aksumite–Persian wars, it became a Sasanian territory, where a mixed community known as al-Abna' developed in the aftermath of marriages between Iranian soldiers and Arab women in the region. The community gradually assimilated into the society of the South Arabian Himyarite Kingdom, and later gained prominence for their activities during the rise of Islam.

According to Al-Maqdisī, Persians formed the majority of Aden's population in the 10th century.

Persian ports and Yemeni ports like Aden were rival destinations for Indian Ocean commerce. In the mid-12th century, a force from Salghurid Persia besieged Aden.

The Shia Zaidi state of Yemen established diplomatic relations with the Safavid dynasty of Persia.

=== 20th and 21st centuries ===
==== Pahlavi era ====
In the 1960s, Iranian Shah Mohammad Reza Pahlavi supported Yemeni fighters against militant Marxists.

==== Islamic Republic era ====
In the late 1980s, the Islamic Republic of Iran moved more closely to Yemen following the end of the Iran–Iraq War. In the early 1990s, Iran accommodated Houthi religious students. Among those students was Hussein al-Houthi, who led the Houthi insurgency against the government. Following the departure of Yemeni President Ali Abdullah Saleh in 2012, Iranian officials began to rhetorically support the Houthis. In January 2013, a Yemeni boarding team operating from the USS Farragut (DDG-99) seized an Iranian dhow off the coast of Yemen that was found to be carrying Chinese QW-1 MANPADs. Relations between the two nations soured as Iran denied Yemeni assertions that the shipment was an Iranian attempt to arm rebel forces. The ship's movements had been tracked by American forces from the point when it loaded cargo at an Iranian military base until it was seized.

On 2 October 2015, the Yemeni government Aden television reportedly announced that Yemen had severed diplomatic relations with Iran due to alleged Iranian support for the Houthis to overthrow Yemeni President Abd Rabbuh Mansur Hadi. A Yemeni government spokesman later denied the television report, saying that "the cabinet has not discussed until now the matter of severing diplomatic relations with Iran and no decision was taken".

In late 2019, the Yemeni embassy in Tehran was transferred to the Houthi government. This move was criticized by the Arab League.

On 17 October 2020, Iran posted Hassan Eyrlou as its ambassador in Sanaa. On 17 December 2021, Eyrlou was evacuated to Tehran after testing positive for COVID-19 and died there three days later.

On 27 August 2024, Iran appointed Ali Mohamed Ramadani as its new ambassador.

== See also ==
- Foreign relations of Iran
- Foreign relations of Yemen
- Iran–Saudi Arabia relations
- Iran–Libya relations
