= Khaled al-Wesabi =

Yemeni politician

Minister of Higher Education
- Incumbent
- Assumed office 18 December 2020
- President: Abdrabbuh Mansur Hadi, Rashad al-Alimi
- Preceded by: Hussein Basalamh

Khaled Ahmed Saad al-Wesabi (Arabic: خالد أحمد سعد الوصابي, born 1973 in Dhamar) is a Yemeni politician and current minister of Higher Education and Scientific Research and Technical Education and Vocational in the cabinet of Yemen since 18 December 2020.

== See also ==
- Cabinet of Yemen
- Politics of Yemen
