= Abu Bakr al-Qirbi =

Yemeni politician and diplomat (born 1942)

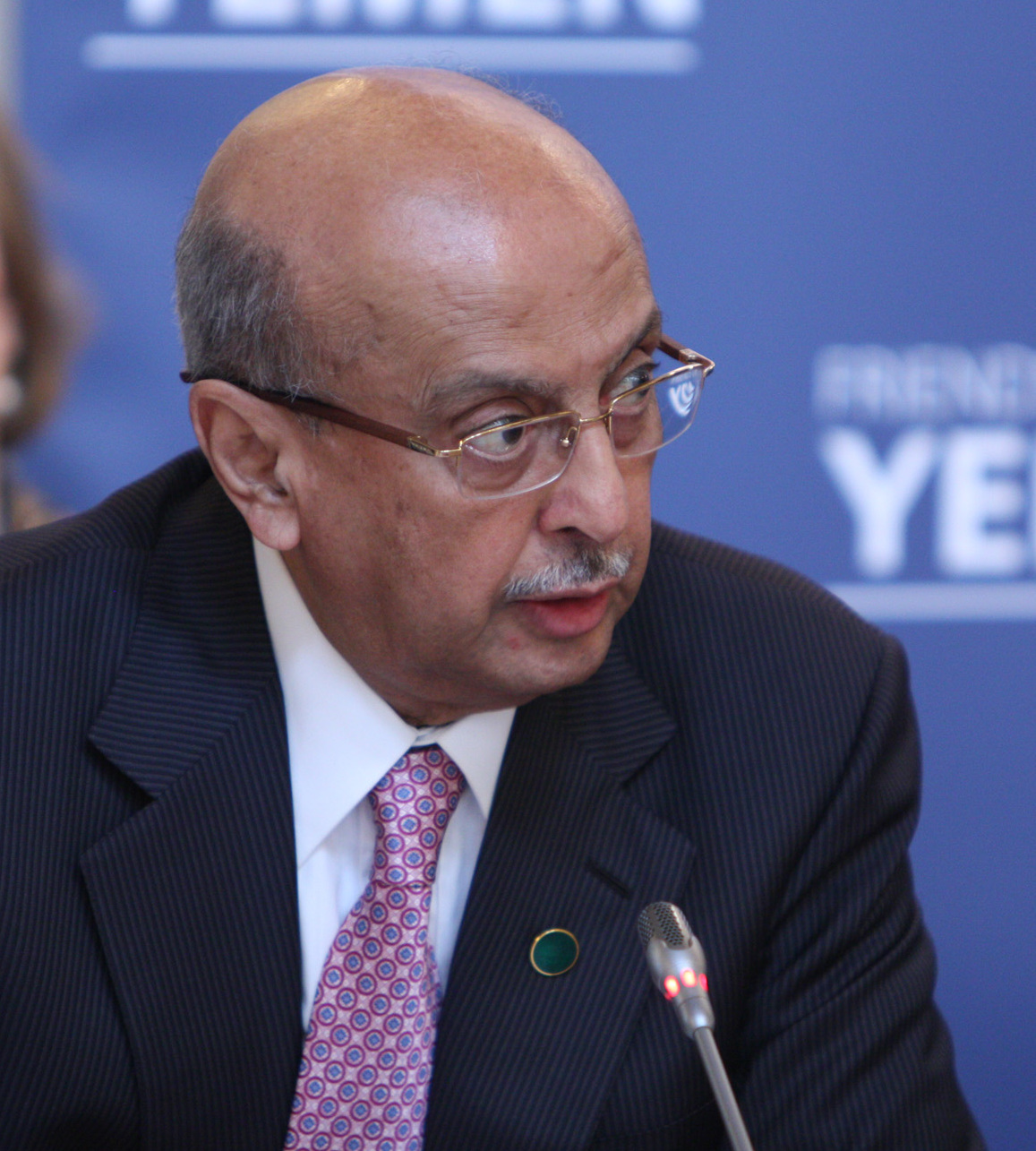

Minister of Foreign Affairs of Yemen
- In office 4 October 2016 – 28 November 2016*; Disputed
- President: Saleh Ali al-Sammad
- Prime Minister: Abdel-Aziz bin Habtour
- Succeeded by: Hisham Sharaf
- In office 4 April 2001 – 11 June 2014
- President: Ali Abdullah Saleh; Abdrabbuh Mansur Hadi
- Prime Minister: Abdul Qadir Bajamal; Ali Muhammad Mujawar; Mohammed Basindawa
- Preceded by: Abdul Qadir Bajamal
- Succeeded by: Jamal Abdullah al-Sallal

Personal details
- Born: 1942 (age 83–84) Al Bayda, Yemen
- Education: University of Edinburgh
- *Qirbi's term has been disputed by Abdulmalik Al-Mekhlafi.

Abu Bakr Abdullah al-Qirbi (Arabic: أبو بكر عبد الله القربي) is a Yemeni diplomat who was minister of foreign affairs of Yemen from 2001 to 2014. He later also held the same role in the Houthis' contested cabinet formed in 2016, in spite of his former opposition to the Houthis.

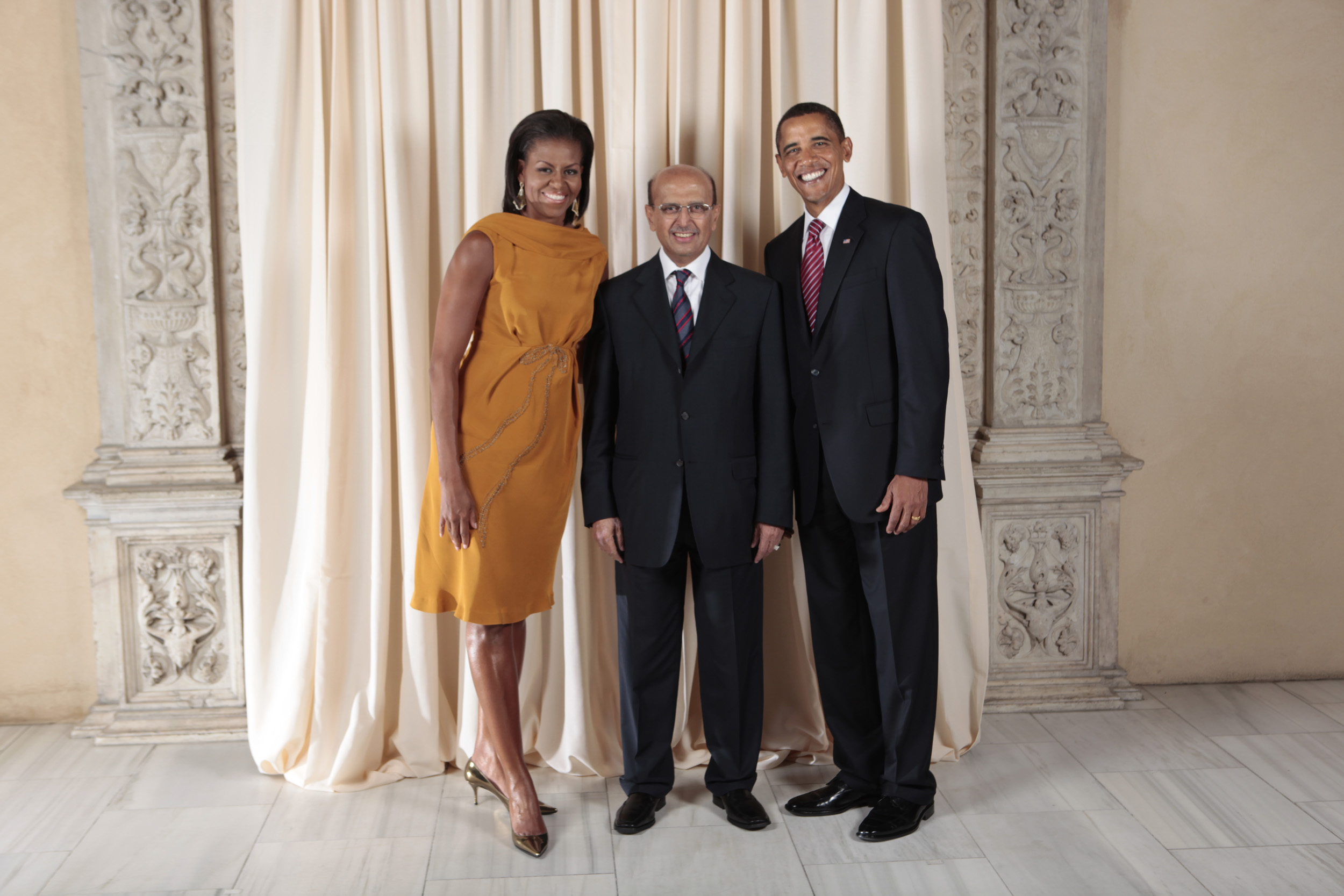
Abu Bakr al-Qirbi with United States President Barack Obama and First Lady Michelle Obama.

He was vice rector of Sanaa University from 1982 to 1993 and minister of education from 1993 to 1994.

On 13 December 2009, al-Qirbi urged Iran's government to crack down on Iranian groups whom he accused of aiding Houthi rebels in northern Yemen, holding the Iranian government partly to blame. According to al-Qirbi, "religious (Shiite) circles and groups in Iran are providing aid to the Houthis"; however, Iran repeatedly denied such accusations.

Following the anti-government protests in Yemen, President Ali Abdullah Saleh dismissed all members of the Cabinet of Yemen on March 20, 2011. They were to remain as serving members until a new government was formed.

On 4 October 2016, during the civil war, he was appointed foreign minister in Abdel-Aziz bin Habtour's cabinet.

== Honours ==
=== Foreign honours ===
- Italy
  - (Kingdom of the Two Sicilies) Two Sicilian Royal Family: Knight Commander of the Royal Order of Francis I
