= Afrah al-Zouba =

Yemeni diplomat and activist (born 1976)

Afrah Abdulaziz al-Zouba
- أفراح عبد العزيز الزوبة

Afrah Abdulaziz al-Zouba (Arabic: أفراح عبد العزيز الزوبة; born 1976) is a Yemeni diplomat and activist, and the first female Minister of Foreign Affairs and Expatriates. Before being appointed to the ministry, she was an advisor to the Prime Minister for humanitarian-related matters, had performed high-level management between the Yemeni government and international partners, and served as Minister of Planning and International Cooperation. Additionally, she worked in USAID for two years.

== Early life ==
=== Education ===
In 1995, al-Zouba received a bachelor's degree in Pharmaceutical Sciences at Sana'a University. She studied at Hospital University Kebangsaan Malaysia, receiving a Master of Science in Community Management in 2009. Additionally, she received a Master of Business Administration at the University of Science and Technology in Yemen.
