= Iranian support for the Houthis =

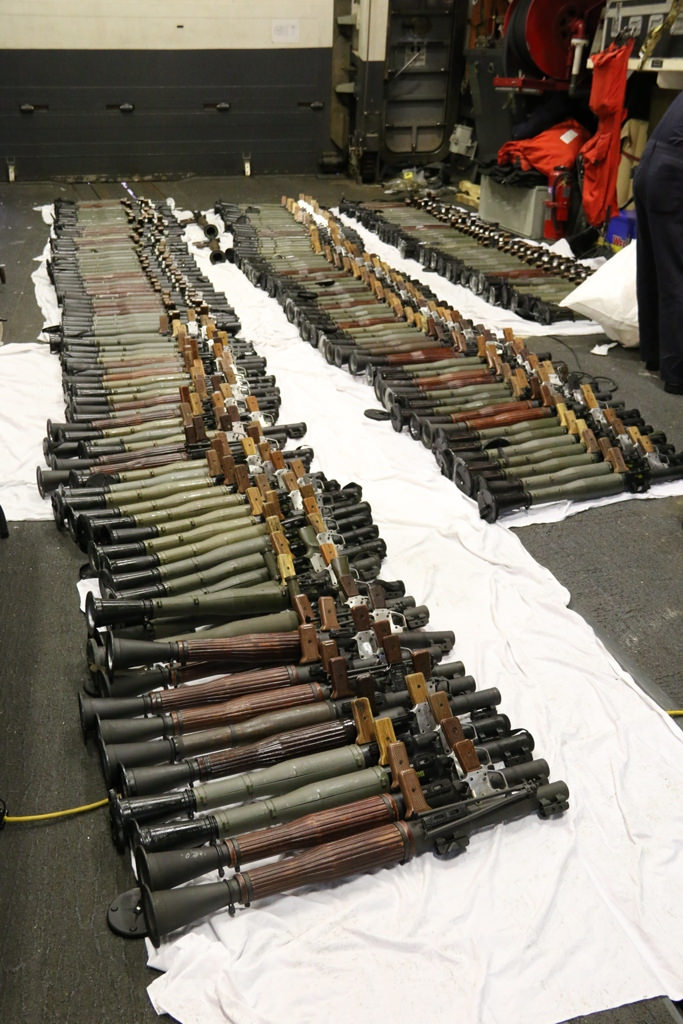
Cache of weapons, which according to US assessments originated in Iran and was bound for the Houthis, intercepted by the coastal patrol ship USS Sirocco (PC 6) on 28 March 2016, in the Arabian Sea.

Iran has been a key supporter of the Houthi movement in Yemen, providing military, financial, and logistical support, despite both Iran and the Houthis denying the scale of assistance since its inception. The relationship dates back to the 1990s, when Houthi leaders received religious training in Iran. By 2009, Iran began offering more direct support, and this escalated after the collapse of the Yemeni government in 2011. Following the Houthis' takeover of Sanaa in 2014, Iranian support became more overt, with the supply of advanced weapons, military training, and intelligence. This support helped the Houthis bolster their military capabilities, including the use of sophisticated missiles and drones, which have played a significant role in their ongoing conflict with Saudi-led forces and used to target Israel. The Iranian weapons are being used in the disruption of the global maritime trade route through the Bab al-Mandab strait.

The strategic benefits for Iran in backing the Houthis are significant, particularly in terms of countering Saudi influence and furthering its regional interests. Iran has used the Houthis to destabilise the region and exert pressure on Saudi Arabia, including through attacks on Saudi military and civilian targets and commercial vessels in the Red Sea. This proxy warfare allows Iran to challenge Saudi Arabia without direct involvement. In return, the Houthis align themselves with Iran's ideological goals, promoting resistance against Western influence and supporting Iranian interests in the broader Middle East. However, the degree of Iranian control over the Houthis has also been exaggerated by anti-Houthi forces, such as subsequent Yemeni governments and their Saudi and American allies.

== Background ==
There is circumstantial evidence pointing to an informal relationship between Iran and the Houthis during the 1990s, as members of the al-Houthi family, Badr al-Din al-Houthi, and his sons, Hussein al-Houthi and Abdul Malik al-Houthi received religious training in the Iranian Islamic seminary in al-Qom. Prior to 2010, Iranian media denied Iranian assistance to the Houthis and rarely referred to the military and political crisis in Yemen, though from late November 2009 it gradually increased its reports of Saudi attacks against Yemeni Shi'ites, and at times portraying it as being against the entire Shia world. This is interpreted by the RAND institute as an attempt to garner public support for future Iranian assistance to the Houthis. According to some experts, Iran "has unquestionably lent the Houthis some support, most likely through its Lebanese proxy Hezbollah, since at least the mid-2000s", others assert that official Iranian influence on the Houthis began in 2009, with the final phase of the Houthi insurgency against the Yemeni government, when according to the Yemeni chief of counterterrorism, Iran was training and arming Houthi militants. Until the Arab Spring and the fall of the Yemeni government "the Yemeni state was weak but functional" and it was too difficult for Iran to infiltrate, but after 2011 the state nearly collapsed and the barriers preventing Iran's entry, which were maintained by the recognised Yemeni government, were eliminated. Newly opened smuggling routes between Iran and Yemen greatly limited the costs and risks involved in Iran's provision of materiel support to the Houthis.

Between 2011, when the revolt against the government began, and 2014, when the government was overthrown, Iranian support of the Houthis was fairly limited. In September 2014 the Houthis gained control over Sana'a, after which they began making several overtures to Iran, by releasing Iranian prisoners, both from Hezbollah and the IRGC, and by announcing direct flights from Iran to the airport in Sana'a, each act being an expression of Houthi aspirations for stronger ties and additional support from Iran. Most experts agree that Iran provided the Houthis with weapons that same year. By waging a civil war with Iranian assistance and pushing all the way to southern Yemen, the Houthis demonstrated their potential value to Iran. The Houthis view themselves as part of the "axis of resistance" led by Iran and their ideology is echoed in their slogans calling for the death of America and Israel, the destruction of the Jews and victory of Islam.

Iranian backing of the Houthis has been reported by diplomatic correspondents of major news outlets, and has been the reported perspective of Yemeni governmental leaders militarily and politically opposing Houthi efforts (e.g., as of 2017, the UN-recognized, deposed Yemeni President Abd Rabbu Mansour Hadi, who referred to the "Houthi rebels... as 'Iranian militias'"). The Houthis in turn accused the Saleh government of being backed by Saudi Arabia and of using Al-Qaeda to repress them. Under the next President Hadi, Gulf Arab states accused Iran of backing the Houthis financially and militarily, though Iran denied this, and they were themselves backers of President Hadi. Despite confirming statements by Iranian and Yemeni officials in regards to Iranian support in the form of trainers, weaponry, and money, the Houthis denied reception of substantial financial or arm support from Iran.

== Houthi promotion of Iranian interests in the region ==
Some of Iran's regional interests and geopolitical objectives are served through its fostering of conflict and instability in Yemen, specifically along the border with Saudi Arabia, a long time adversary of Iran. Deployment of the Houthis along the border allows the crossing of terrorists into Saudi Arabia, and forces the Saudi Arabian military to focus on Yemen as opposed to Iran. By subsidising proxy warfare in the region Iran achieves its objective of threatening Saudi Arabia at a relatively low cost and minimal risk, but at a great expense for the Saudi military. Essentially, from that perspective, Iran is backing the Houthis to fight against a Saudi-led coalition of Gulf States whose aim is to maintain control of Yemen. Beginning in April 2015, the Houthis engaged in frequent assaults on Saudi Arabia, including ambushing of military convoys, overrunning small border forts, seizure and demolition of large Saudi facilities and partial occupation of depopulated towns, as well as multiple missile attacks involving short, medium and long range ballistic missiles. Additionally, Houthi controlled areas serve as a platform for an Iranian intelligence outpost and a covert weapons distribution network which would promote Iranian military objectives in the Middle East and the Horn of Africa. The Houthis also use Iranian drones to attack its neighbor states.

In return for the support they receive from Iran, the Houthis, as part of the "axis of resistance" seek to prevent Western influence in the Middle East and to intimidate the regional countries which ally themselves with the US. Iran expert Mohammad Ayatollahi Tabaar from Foreign Affairs states that the Houthis assist Iran by posing a regional threat to Saudi Arabia and allowing Iran to evade the sanctions on its oil trade by protecting the Iranian vessels in the Red Sea.

Conversely, different sources have also stated that the degree of Iranian control over the Houthi movement should not be exaggerated. In April 2015, United States National Security Council spokesperson Bernadette Meehan remarked that "It remains our assessment that Iran does not exert command and control over the Houthis in Yemen". Joost Hiltermann wrote that Iran does not control the Houthis' decision-making as evidenced by Houthis' flat rejection of Iran's demand not to take over Sanaa in 2015. Thomas Juneau, writing in the journal International Affairs, states that even though Iran's support for Houthis has increased since 2014, it remains far too limited to have a significant impact in the balance of power in Yemen. The Quincy Institute for Responsible Statecraft argues that Teheran's influence over the movement has been "greatly exaggerated" by "the Saudis, their coalition partners (mainly the United Arab Emirates), and their [lobbyists] in Washington."

Similarly, academics such as Marieke Brandt and Charles Schmitz have stated that the allegation that the Houthis are merely an Iranian proxy force has its roots in political narratives by Saleh, Saudi Arabia, the United States and other anti-Houthi forces. While the Houthis have praised post-Islamic Revolution Iran for its opposition to supposed American and Israeli imperialism in the Middle East, they have also criticized Iranian political and religious doctrine, including Iran's state religion of Twelver Shi'ism. Political scientists Stacey Yadav and Sheila Carapico describe the common narrative that focuses on the Houthis' Zaydism and pro-Iranian stance as "an all-purpose Shi'i vs. Sunni simplification".

== Iranian support for the Houthis ==
Iran is the only country who recognises the Houthi government in Sana'a, and according to the Council of Foreign Affairs (CFR) "Iran is the Houthis' primary benefactor", providing them with weapons, training and military intelligence. This relationship has been a significant factor in enhancing the group's military capabilities. Through this alliance, the Houthis have gained access to advanced weaponry, including sophisticated missiles and drones, which would have otherwise been impossible for them to manufacture independently. Iranian support has played a crucial role in strengthening the Houthis' ability to assert military dominance within Yemen. However, analysts suggest that the strategic impact of this support extends beyond the Yemeni conflict, influencing regional dynamics and altering the balance of power in the broader Middle East. According to Gulf analyst of the Sana'a Center for Strategic Studies "The role of Iran has been decisive in providing the Houthis with smuggled weapons and expertise to project power into the Red Sea and Bab al-Mandab Strait".

=== Iranian military support ===
Beginning in 2009, Iran increasingly involved itself in support of the Houthis, and through Iranian assistance the Houthis have gained military strength through the acquirement of cruise missiles, ballistic missiles and UAVs. in a similar fashion to other Iranian-sponsored militias in the Middle East, such as Hezbollah and Hamas.

In 2013, an Iranian vessel was seized and discovered to be carrying Katyusha rockets, heat-seeking surface-to-air missiles, RPG-7s, Iranian-made night vision goggles and artillery systems that track land and navy targets 40 km away. That was en route to the Houthis.

In early 2013, photographs released by the Yemeni government show the United States Navy and Yemen's security forces seizing a class of "either modern Chinese- or Iranian-made" shoulder-fired, heat-seeking anti-aircraft missiles "in their standard packaging", missiles "not publicly known to have been out of state control", raising concerns of Iran's arming of the rebels.

On the edition of 8 April 2015 of PBS Newshour, Secretary of State John Kerry stated that the US knew Iran was providing military support to the Houthi rebels in Yemen, adding that Washington "is not going to stand by while the region is destabilised".

In April 2016, the U.S. Navy intercepted a large Iranian arms shipment, seizing thousands of AK-47 rifles, rocket-propelled grenade launchers, and 0.50-caliber machine guns, a shipment described as likely headed to Yemen by the Pentagon.

In a report quoted by Al-Arabiya it was stated that in 2016 Iran provided 90 million dollars in aid to the Houthis in addition to weapons and ammunition delivered by the 34th and 44th ranks of the Iranian navy. It was also reported that 1100 Houthi militants were trained in IRGC training facilities, and 250 "were being trained in the Quds force garrison in the Iranian city of Hamedan" and that three top commanders from the Iranian Revolutionary Guards, Col. Ridaa Bassini, Com. Ali al-Rajabi and Maj. Gen. Mohammad Niazi, were sent to Yemen to work with the Houthis.

As of 2017 the Iranian Ministry of Defense had sent an ammunition manufacturing team, headed by Bahram Rahnama, to Yemen in order to assist the Houthis in their weapon production. According to Michael Knights of the Washington Institute, Hezbollah also aids the Houthis at the behest of the Iranian regime, and its representatives, together with those of the IRGC, serve as advisors to the Houthi military committee, the Jihad council.

In March 2017, Qasem Soleimani, the head of Iran's Quds Force, met with Iran's Islamic Revolutionary Guard Corps (IRGC) to look for ways to what was described as "empowering" the Houthis. Soleimani was quoted as saying, "At this meeting, they agreed to increase the amount of help, through training, arms and financial support." Despite this statement to the contrary, both the Iranian government and Houthis officially denied Iranian support for the group. Brigadier General Ahmad Asiri, the spokesman of the Saudi-led coalition told Reuters that evidence of Iranian support was manifested in the Houthi use of Kornet anti-tank guided missiles which had never been in use with the Yemeni military or with the Houthis and that the arrival of Kornet missiles had only come at a later time. In the same month the IRGC had altered the routes used in transporting equipment to the Houthis by spreading out shipments to smaller vessels in Kuwaiti territorial waters in order to avoid naval patrols in the Gulf of Oman due to sanctions imposed, shipments reportedly included parts of missiles, launchers, and drugs.

In May 2018, the United States imposed sanctions on Iran's IRGC, which was also listed as a designated terrorist organization by the US and others for many actions including its role supporting the Houthis by providing help manufacturing ballistic missiles used in attacks targeting cities and oil fields in Saudi Arabia.

In August 2018, despite previous Iranian denial of military support for the Houthis, IRGC commander Nasser Shabani was quoted by the Iranian Fars News Agency as saying, "We (IRGC) told Yemenis [Houthi rebels] to strike two Saudi oil tankers, and they did it", on 7 August 2018. In response to Shabani's account, the IRGC released a statement saying that the quote was a "Western lie" and that Shabani was a retired commander, despite no actual reports of his retirement after 37 years in the IRGC, and media linked to the Iranian government confirming he was still enlisted with the IRGC. Furthermore, while the Houthis and the Iranian government have previously denied any military affiliation, Iranian supreme leader Ali Khamenei openly announced his "spiritual" support of the movement in a personal meeting with the Houthi spokesperson Mohammed Abdul Salam in Tehran, in the midst of ongoing conflicts in Aden in 2019.

In January 2024, the US intercepted and captured an Iranian vessel carrying drone parts, missile warheads and anti-tank missiles to the Houthis, According to The Council on Foreign Relations, military aid of this type usually reaches the Houthis through the Iranian IRGC.

In July 2024, the United States applied new sanctions on the IRGC due to ties with the group. Ansar Allah dismissed the sanctions as pathetic and powerless.

Also in 2024, commanders from IRGC and Hezbollah were reported to be actively involved on the ground in Yemen, overseeing and directing Houthi attacks on Red Sea shipping, according to a report by Reuters. Iran further facilitates Houthi attacks in the Red Sea by providing them with the means to gather intelligence on maritime trading vessels along the international shipping lanes. Owing to Iranian assistance, the Houthis are capable of maintaining "an up-to-date-maritime intelligence picture" with Iranian radar ships such as MV Saviz and MV Behshad together with smaller Iranian vessels conducting visual observations while avoiding detection.

On 27 June 2025, the National Resistance Forces (NRF) of Yemen Intercepted a shipment of Iranian weapons from Djibouti bound for the port of al-Salif, controlled by the Houthis. This was despite a letter the Islamic Republic sent to the UN Security Council in February, denying that it was in "violation of arms embargoes" or that it was "fueling the conflict in Yemen". According to The Foundation for Defense of Democracies, the shipment included multiple weapons systems which were manufactured by an Iranian Ministry of Defense affiliate included land-attack cruise missiles (LACM), turbo-jet engines, electro-optical seekers for anti-ship ballistic missiles (ABMs), a Shahed-107 Attack drone, piston engines, anti-tank guided missile (ATGM) warheads, man-portable air defense systems (MANPADs), Ghadir and Sejjil anti-ship cruise missiles, and the Qaem-118 anti-drone missile.

On 22 September 2026, foreign ministers from the G7 countries—Canada, the United States, Italy, Japan, France, the United Kingdom and Germany—issued a statement that Iran was threatening international trade and destabilizing the world. They called on Iran to stop supporting the Houthis in Yemen. They also said that the actions of the armed forces had increased tensions, but did not mention the actions of the United States and its allies in the region. Iran has repeatedly denied Western claims regarding financial and military support to the Houthis.

=== Iranian support in Red Sea attacks ===
Between November 2023 and December 2024, the Houthis conducted over 100 attacks on commercial and military vessels in the red sea, effectively making the Bab al-Mandab chokepoint into an anti-access/area-denial zone. At first, the Houthis threatened to target any ship traveling to or departing from Israel, though these threats were eventually to include ships remotely linked to Israel and finally ships related to the US and UK. In fact, the subsequent assaults, consisting of more than 130 missile and drone attacks on international commercial and naval vessels, were indiscriminate, and many of the attacked ships had no relation to Israel, US or the UK at all; assaulted ships included some from China and Russia as well as others which were bound for Iran.

According to CFR, the Houthis field-test Iranian weaponry on Saudi Arabia and in the Red Sea while providing Iran with plausible deniability, as they "claim responsibility for attacks likely ordered or perpetrated by Iran". Iranian backed Houthi attacks on targets in the Red Sea have had a ruinous effect on international shipping, as they have forced ships into alternative trade routes around the African Cape of Good Hope. As a direct result of the rerouting, disrupted supply chains have been extended by at least two weeks, cargo volumes traversing the strait have dropped by two thirds and the cost to global economy in 2024 has been estimated at 200 billion dollars. According to CFR, "Tehran has voiced its unequivocal support for the operations and reportedly assists the Houthis in targeting vessels".

=== Legal consequences of Iranian support to Houthis ===
Supplying arms to a belligerent in a conflict is a violation of the neutral status according to the Hague Conventions of 1899 and 1907 (XIII) While this nominally only covers naval warfare, it is now considered to cover neutrality in all forms of warfare. International Humanitarian Law only supports a binary status. Either you are neutral or you are a belligerent.

Modern armed conflicts recognizes also a non-belligerent status, where violations of neutrality, like shipping arms is accepted without involving the non-belligerent party in direct combat. This is not supported in International Humanitarian Law but works in practice since the belligerent on the other side may prefer to not involve the non-belligerent in combat.

The Red Cross does not consider shipping arms, automatically results in the shipper becoming a belligerent.

When determining whether States that supply arms are considered to be parties to armed conflict, the International Red Cross applies the following rules:

- Under IHL, a State does not become a party to an armed conflict on the sole ground that it supplies weapons or military equipment to a belligerent.
- A State supplying arms to a State party to an international armed conflict becomes itself a party to that conflict if it resorts to armed force against another belligerent State, such as when it is effectively involved in military operations against that State.
- A State supplying arms to a non-State armed group party to an armed conflict becomes itself a party to the conflict when it equips (with weapons for instance) and finances such group but also coordinates or helps in the general planning of its military activity, thereby exerting overall control over such group.

From the last rule, it appears that Iran is a belligerent in any conflict involving the Houthis.

== See also ==
- Iran and state-sponsored terrorism
- Iran–Yemen relations
- Houthi–Saudi Arabian conflict
- Houthi takeover in Yemen
- Red Sea crisis
- Saudi-led intervention in the Yemeni civil war
- Muhammad Abd al-Karim al-Ghamari
- Hezbollah–Iran relations
- Iranian support for Hamas
- 2026 United States military buildup in the Middle East
