= Khaled al-Yamani =

Yemeni politician (born 1960)

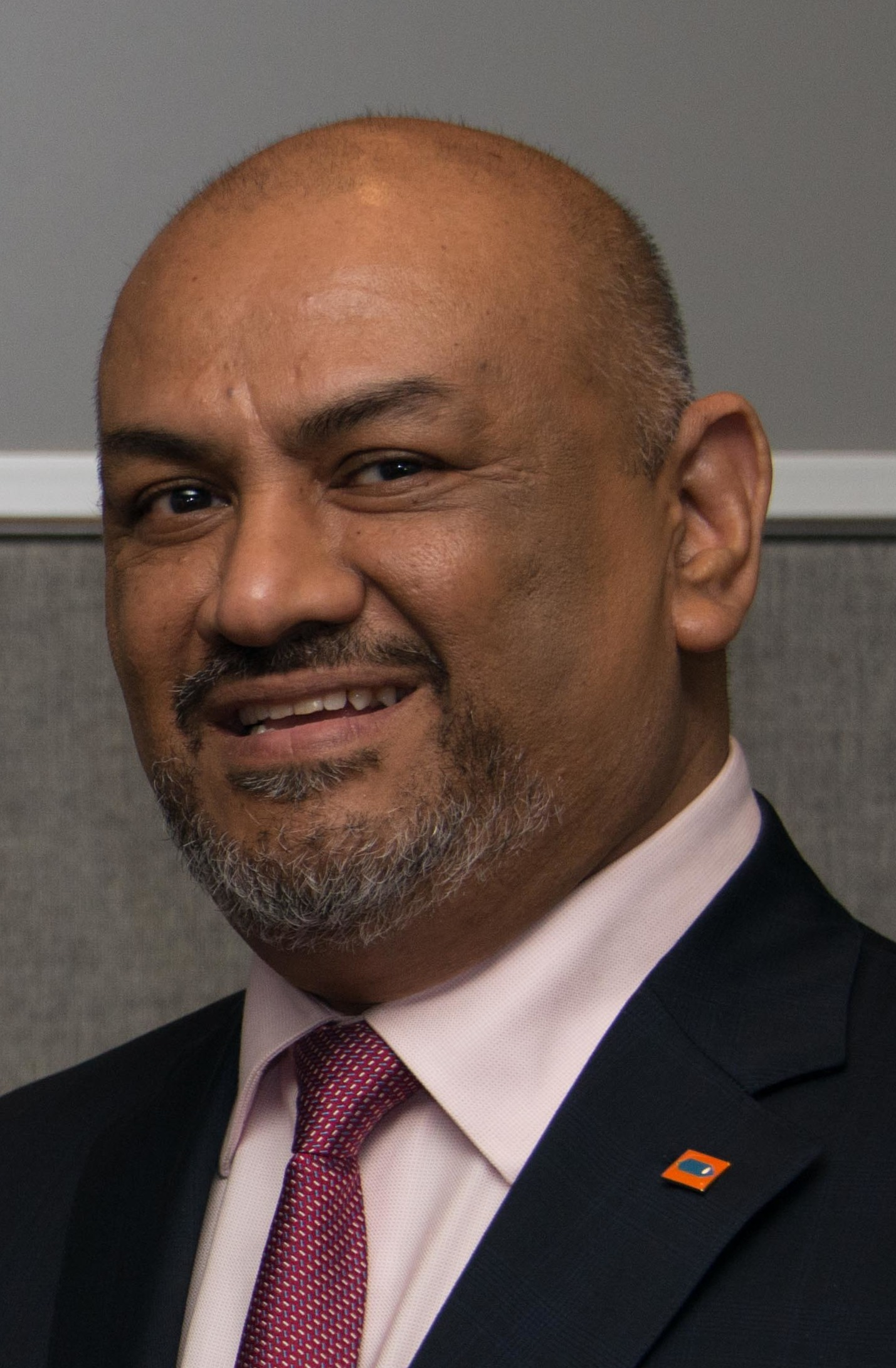
- Khaled al-Yamani in 2018

Minister of Foreign Affairs of Yemen
- In office 24 May 2018 – 10 June 2019
- President: Abdrabbuh Mansur Hadi
- Prime Minister: Ahmed Obeid bin Daghr
- Preceded by: Abdulmalik Al-Mekhlafi
- Succeeded by: Mohammed Al-Hadhrami

Personal details
- Born: 2 May 1960 (age 65) Aden, Yemen

Khaled al-Yamani is a Yemeni politician and former foreign minister. He resigned from his post on 10 June 2019 due to differences over a UN-brokered peace deal.

== See also ==
- List of foreign ministers in 2018
- List of current foreign ministers
