= Ministry of Foreign Affairs and Expatriates (Yemen) =

Government ministry of Yemen

Republic of Yemen Ministry of Foreign Affairs and Expatriates
- وزارة الخارجية وشؤون المغتربين
- Emblem of Yemen

Ministry overview
- Formed: 1990
- Jurisdiction: Yemen
- Headquarters: Aden (PLC); Sanaa (SPC)
- Ministry executives: Afrah al-Zouba, Minister of Foreign Affairs (PLC); Abdel Wahed Abu Rass, deputy foreign minister; (SPC)
- Website: mofa-ye.org (PLC); mofa.gov.ye (SPC)

The Ministry of Foreign Affairs and Expatriates (Arabic: وزارة الخارجية وشؤون المغتربين) is a cabinet ministry of Yemen. The ministry is responsible for conducting foreign relations of the country.

== List of ministers ==
The following is a list of foreign ministers of Yemen since the 1990 unification:

Term	Name	Portrait
1990–1993	Abdul-Karim Al-Iryani	
1993–1994	Mohammed Basindawa	
1994–1998	Abdul-Karim Al-Iryani	
1998–2001	Abdul Qadir Bajamal	
2001–2014	Abu Bakr al-Qirbi	
2014	Jamal Abdullah al-Sallal	
2014–2015	Abdullah al-Saidi	
Aden–based Hadi/Alimi government
2015	Riad Yassin	
2015–2018	Abdulmalik Al-Mekhlafi	
2018–2019	Khaled al-Yamani	
2019–2020	Mohammed Al-Hadhrami	
2020–2024	Ahmad Awad bin Mubarak	
2024–2026	Shaya al-Zindani	
2026–present	Afrah al-Zouba	
Sanaa–based Houthi government
2016	Abu Bakr al-Qirbi	
2016–2024	Hisham Sharaf	
2024–2025	Jamal Amer	

For ministers of foreign affairs of the Yemen Arab Republic before the 1990 unification, see Minister of Foreign Affairs of North Yemen.

== See also ==
- Cabinet of Yemen
- Politics of Yemen
