= Abdullah al-Saidi =

Yemeni diplomat

Abdullah al-Saidi (born 1947) is a Yemeni diplomat. He served as the Yemeni Ambassador to the United Nations from 22 July 2002 to 2011, replacing Abdullah Saleh al-Ashtal. He quit his position over the 2011 Yemeni uprising. He was replaced by Jamal Abdullah al-Sallal as the ambassador to the UN.

== Education ==
He received his BA degree in political science from Long Island University in 1975 and his MA in political science from Columbia University in 1982.

== Career ==
He has also held important government positions, including Vice-Minister for Foreign Affairs from 1999 to 2002 and member of the National Arbitration Committee with Eritrea over the Hanish Islands from 1996 to 2002. In 1995, he served as Counsellor in the Office of the Foreign Minister. From 1986 to 1988, he was Director of the Deputy Foreign Minister's Office. In 1997, he was a member of the Yemeni delegation to the United Nations Mission. He also served as foreign minister from 2014 to 2015.

== Personal life ==
He is married and has three children.
